= Frank Post =

Personal information
- Full name: Franklin Post
- Born: April 20, 1962 (age 64) Watsonville, California, United States
- Height: 1.79 m (5 ft 10 in)
- Weight: 75 kg (165 lb)

Cycling career
- Sport: Cycling
- Current team: Retired
- Discipline: Bicycle Motocross (BMX)
- Role: Racer
- Rider type: Off Road

Amateur team
- 1978: Cycle City West

Professional teams
- 1979: Hank & Frank Bicycles/Cycle Pro
- 1979: Patterson Racing Products
- 1979-1980: Panda Bike Company
- 1980: Wes' BMX
- 1980-1981: Kuwahara Cycles, Ltd.
- 1981: JC BMX
- 1981-1982: Boss Racing Frames
- 1982: Kuwahara Cycles, Ltd.
- 1982: JC BMX
- 1982-1983: Wes' BMX
- 1983: Boss Racing Frames
- 1983-1984: Race Incorporated
- 1984: Boss Racing Frames
- 1984: CW Racing
- 1984: U.S. Boss Racing Products
- 1984-1985: JMC Racing Equipment
- 1985: Wes' BMX
- 1985: U.S. Boss Racing Products
- 1985: Livermore Schwinn
- 1985-?: Schwinn Bicycle Company
- 1989: MCS Magnum Force

Franklin Post (born April 20, 1962 from Watsonville, California U.S.) was an American professional "Old School" Bicycle Motocross (BMX) racer whose prime competitive years were from 1978-1981. Early in his career his nickname was "CW Post", a play on his surname of Post which happened to be the same as a famous breakfast cereal manufacturer, C. W. Post. When the BMX bicycle manufacturer, CW Racing became widely known in 1981 this nickname for Frank Post fell into disuse to avoid the implication that Frank Post was a sponsored racer for CW Racing, although he would be later in his career. Also toward the end of the 1970s he was known as "Wild Man" for his controversial actions on the race track. BMX Action publisher and photographer Bob Osborn bestowed this nickname onto him after a photoshoot.

== Racing career milestones ==
Note: Professional first are on the national level unless otherwise indicated.

Started racing: In 1976 at 14 years old at the McLaren Park Track.

Sanctioning body:

First race bike: An R&R given him by a friend.

First race result: After winning his first moto, he fell in the main.

First win (local):

Home sanctioning body district(s): National Bicycle Association (NBA) District "N" (Northern California);

First sponsor:

First National win:

Turned Professional: May 1978 at 16 years of age.

First Professional race* result: Made the 16 Expert* main at the 1978 NBA Grand National in Los Angeles, California but crashed when Brent Patterson landed in front of him after both of them negotiated a jump simultaneously. Ended in last place. In 1978 the pros could race in the 16 Expert amateur class. There was no purse in the 16 Expert class but he raced the likes of Stu Thomsen and Kevin McNeal as well as Brent Patterson-all established pros-in 16 expert. There was a separate special pros only class that was the final of a separate series at the Grand Nationals with David Clinton taking the Lion's share of a US$3000 pro purse.

First Professional win*: In 16 Expert at the National Bicycle Association (NBA) Spring National in Watsonville, California on May 27, 1979. He was also a pro at the time.*

Retired: He quietly faded out of the race scene after the 1986 season. In 1990 he had himself reclassified as an amateur and raced in the 26-30 class at the ABA winternationals.

Height & weight at height of his career (1978–1985): Ht:5'10 1/2" Wt:165 lbs.

*At the time there was no separate pro class for pros due to the relatively small number of pros. They raced with the 16 Experts, making it a Pro/Am class essentially. This is why during the early years of the pro division the national number one racer of a sanctioning body could be either an amateur or professional. This practice continued until the NBA's 1979 season in which the pros earned separate pro points and a separate pro plate from the amateurs.

=== Career factory and major bike shop sponsors ===
Note: This listing only denotes the racer's primary sponsors. At any given time a racer could have numerous ever changing co-sponsors. Primary sponsorships can be verified by BMX press coverage and sponsor's advertisements at the time in question. When possible exact dates are used.

==== Amateur ====
- Cycle City West (bicycle shop): 1978

==== Professional ====
- Hank & Frank Bicycles (bicycle shop)/Cycle Pro: May 27, 1979-April 3, 1979. This was Post's first sponsor as a pro after racing as a pro totally independent for a full year. A week later Vance Patterson of Patterson Racing offered him a sponsorship. He accepted.
- Patterson Racing Products: April 3, 1979-September 1979. Frank Post left Patterson Racing because he couldn't get to races. Patterson had a told him that if he could get to races, they would pay for them. However, lacking funds and not being able to drive, he couldn't get to races. The Panda Bike Company offered to pay his travel expenses to races. He accepted.
- Panda Bike Company: September 1979-Late 1980. According to the July 1981 issue of BMX Plus! the reason for Post leaving Panda were "unclear" and explanations from either party, Panda or Post was "scarce".
- Wes' BMX (Bicycle shop): Late 1980-Late December 1980.
- Kuwahara Cycles, Ltd.: Late December 1980-Mid October 1981. After finalizing his deal with Kuwahara, Frank Post received his racing bicycle from the company on Christmas Day 1980, just two days before the JAG World Championships on December 27. Post quit Kuwahara less than a year later because allegedly they didn't follow through on what a major factory sponsor is obliged to do. Excerpt:

"I quit because they did`nt get me a ticket to 81` NBL GRANDS. They did`nt think I would want to go...HELLOOOO!!! Anyway they got me there, but had to pay for everything else w/my own $. in the end I could not get my bike on the plane. No more $, had to leave it in ST.LOUIS at the airport w/cute blonde that rode for Panda. Heavy hittin PP.Can't remember her name.(sorry) [Margo Carroll-ed.]. the next week was THE SILVERDOME, no ticket again...They say well how can you race w/ no bike...I say why isn't my bike here already...they say your responsible for getting your bike back here... but, I didn't win any $$...you have a whole wherehouse full of bikes out there, ya think I can use one. Well the answer was NOOOO!!!...Sooo...I told them to ~!@^!!...+_)!!(..*&^%!!...@##$!!...its sailor talk, not for young ears..."Habba dabba abba babba"...If you know... you know..."---January 12, 2006 Vintage BMX post

- JC BMX: Late 1981-December 1981
- Boss Racing Frames: December 1981-Mid February 1982
- Kuwahara Cycles, Ltd.: Mid February 1982-Late March 1982. Post second stint with this company. "Kuwahara" means "Mulberry Meadows" in Japanese. The company is named after Sentaro Kuwahara who founded the company in 1916 in Osaka, Japan.
- JC BMX: Early April 1982-Early May 1982
- Wes' BMX: Early May 1982-Early 1983
- Boss Racing Frames: Early 1983-October 1983.
- Race Incorporated: Late October 1983-March 1984. Race Inc. went out of business in the late spring of 1984.
- Boss Racing Frames: March 1984-July 1984
- CW (Custom Works) Racing: July 8, 1984-Late 1984. This was a factory support sponsorship. "CW", regarding the bicycle manufacturing firm, never stood for "Coast Wheels" as it is widely thought. Coast Wheels was a bike shop that Roger Worsham owned. Custom Works was a completely different and independent company. This is in contrast with JMC (Jim Melton Cyclery) which did start out as a bicycle shop and then began manufacturing its own BMX components including entire bicycles.
- U.S. Boss Racing Products: Late 1984-December 1984
- JMC (James Melton Cyclery) Racing Equipment: December 1984-Early/Mid 1985. JMC went out of business in July 1985.
- Wes' BMX: Early/Mid 1985-Early July 1985
- U.S. Boss Racing Products: Early July 1985-July 14, 1985 (the day of the ABA Mile High National)
- Wes' BMX: July 20, 1985-Late August 1985
- Livermore Schwinn: Late October 1985-Mid November 1985 (he also worked there as a bicycle mechanic) He transferred to full factory Schwinn shortly after.
- Schwinn Bicycle Company: Mid November 1985-
- MCS Magnum Force (Co-Factory): Early 1989

=== Career bicycle motocross titles ===
Note: Listed are District, State/Provincial/Department, Regional, National, and International titles in italics. Depending on point totals of individual racers, winners of Grand Nationals do not necessarily win National titles. Only sanctioning bodies active during the racer's career are listed.

==== Amateur ====
National Bicycle Association (NBA)

National Bicycle League (NBL)

- None

United Bicycle Racers (UBR)

American Bicycle Association (ABA)

- None

International Bicycle Motocross Federation (IBMXF)

- None

==== Professional ====
National Bicycle Association (NBA)

- 1980 Pro Grandnational Champion.

National Bicycle League (NBL)

- None

United Bicycle Racers (UBR)

- 1979 Pro Class and Open Expert Grandnational Champion
- 1979 National No.1 Pro
- 1980 Pro Grandnational Champion

American Bicycle Association (ABA)

- 1980 Pro Grandnational Champion

United States Bicycle Motocross Association (USBA)

- None

International Bicycle Motocross Federation (IBMXF)

- None

Pro Series Championships and Invitationals

Other titles:

- 1982 "A" Pro Mongoose/GNC BMX International Champion.*

*The Mongoose Grand National Championships BMX Superbowl of Motocross International Championship Finals II, despite its all encompassing name was a one off non-sanctioned event with no previous qualifying races. It was created by Jerry Surber, a private promoter. ABA officials helped to organize and run the event but it was not officially sanctioned by the ABA or the NBL. However, it operated using NBL rules. The 1982 addition was held on March 14, 1982 (which happened to be Richie Anderson's 15th birthday). The concept was similar to Renny Roker's JAG World Championships held at the end of December. However unlike with the JAG World Championships the title of "Champion" Richie won at this race was unofficial.

=== Notable accolades ===
- Won the 1980 UBR, NBA, and ABA Grand Nationals, the first racer to win the Grand Nationals of three different sanctioning bodies in the same year. Also, he did so without having a major factory sponsor backing him, just a sponsorship from Wes' BMX, a bicycle shop.

=== Racing habits and traits ===
- Reportedly he had a reputation of having a temper on the track. Getting in some altercations with racers. One most notable instance was during the 1981 ABA Summernationals in Amarillo, Texas in which Post thought Kevin McNeal had collided deliberately with him in the first turn. They both went down. Post got up and attempted to hit McNeal, connected, knocking McNeal's visor off. ABA track officials stepped in to prevent things from escalating. What had really happened was that Greg Hill attempted to pass McNeal in the first turn when there was limited space between McNeal and the inside line. Hill and McNeal collided instead both went down. In the same instant McNeal had collided with Post, who was on the outside of McNeal, sending him down. From there the misunderstanding ensued. Adding to the incident. The two, McNeal and Post, had reported personality conflicts when they were teammates on Kuwahara. Post received a 30-day suspension for his actions. Ironically, and perhaps contributing to Post's erroneous belief that McNeal rammed him deliberately, in the previous year it was Kevin McNeal who had the bad reputation as an overly aggressive racer, receiving two suspensions from racing from the NBA and the ABA. McNeal soon after cleaned up his act.

For incidents like this he was called the "Excitable boy of BMX" and even "slightly eccentric" He had a hard time getting along with many sponsors and teammates over things like team policy. Post seemed to have a rootlessness about him that was reflected in his "unstructured life style" as reported in the July 1981 issue of BMX Plus! citing the fact that Post left three telephone numbers with them with Post telling them: "I'll probably be at one of those three sometime." Perhaps due to this he had been with many sponsors during his pro career. As this excerpt from the February 1984 issue of BMX Plus!'s "Inside Scoop" states:

"Frank Post problem is that he has never been able to get along with most of his major sponsors for more than a few months at a time." He has ridden for Patterson Racing, Panda, Kuwahara, Skyway, and Boss."

Post in a post he left of the RoostBMX website provided an explanation for his erattic behavior:

"well im a reputed bad guy...but really just mis-understood. tim did you know i was never paid a salary by a team? the only money i made was on the track. i believe i may have cut you short a time or two, but never out of malice. just business, it was all i had...greg, stu, 50,000, 75,000, 1000,000 [sic]...i had to earn my money, yet i felt i was as fast any day as stu, or greg. this was a very heavy mental blow. i did the best i could, it was`nt always the best, but it is what i did." Frank Post's Roostbmx.com post.

== Post BMX career ==
His post racing career seems to match his racing career: Restless. He has been a Culinary Chef, Pool Shark, Machinist and Salesman amongst other things.

== BMX press magazine interviews and articles ==
- "Post-Haste" Super BMX August 1980 Vol.7 No.8 pg.10
- "Frank Post" BMX Plus! July 1981 Vol.4 No.7 pg.20

== BMX magazine covers ==
Note: Only magazines that were in publication at the time of the racer's career(s) are listed unless specifically noted.

Bicycle Motocross News:

- None

Minicycle/BMX Action & Super BMX:

- None

Bicycle Motocross Action & Go

- None

BMX Plus!:

- April 1980 Vol.3 No.4
- March 1986 Vol.9 No.3 in top insert (18) behind Ronnie Anderson (1) Pete Loncarevich (1) Eddy King (7) Don Johle (10) and Brian Patterson (6) in bottom right insert skateboarder Lester Kasai and in bottom left insert freestyler Mike Dominguez. In main image both Dominguez and Kasai.

Total BMX:

Bicycles and Dirt:

- None

NBA World & NBmxA World (The official NBA/NBmxA membership publication):

Bicycles Today & BMX Today (The official NBL membership publication under two names):

ABA Action, American BMXer, BMXer (The official ABA membership publication under two names):

USBA Racer (The official USBA membership publication):
