= Brian Foster (BMX rider) =

American BMX rider

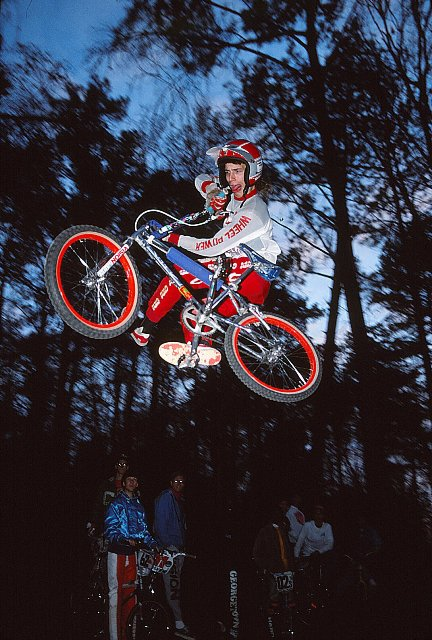
- Can-Can X-Up on the Wheel Power team in 1987

Personal information
- Full name: Brian Keith Foster
- Nicknames: "Dirt", "The Blue Falcon", "BF"
- Born: June 29, 1972 (age 54) Wilmington, Delaware, U.S.
- Height: 1.85 m (6 ft 1 in)
- Weight: 74.8 kg (165 lb)

Cycling career
- Sport: Cycling
- Current team: Retired (racing)
- Discipline: Bicycle motocross (BMX)
- Role: Racer
- Rider type: Off Road

Amateur teams
- 1982–1983: JF&S Plumbing
- 1983–1989: Wheel Power
- 1989: S&M Bicycles
- 1990: TNT/Goodtimes
- 1990–1991: Cyclecraft

Professional teams
- 1991–1992: Cyclecraft
- 1993: Hyper
- 1993–1994: Airwalk
- 1995–1998: Schwinn/Airwalk
- 1998–2000: Schwinn
- 2000–2003: Airwalk/Fit Bike Company
- 2003–present: Fit Bikes/Fox Racing/Primo

Brian Keith Foster (born June 29, 1972) is an American professional bicycle motocross (BMX) rider whose prime competitive years were from 1992 to 2000. Had the nicknames "Blue Falcon", BF" and "Dirt" Brian Foster is one half of one of those sibling combinations that every so often that appear in BMX, usually brothers and along with his brother Alan they were the Mid School era's answer to Old School's *Brent & Brian Patterson and Eddy & Mike King. While neither gained as many titles in racing either collectively or individually as the Pattersons or the Kings (Brian was somewhat more successful in racing than Alan), they soon became respected pioneers and champions in the then new recognized BMX sub discipline of Dirt Jumping that began as an organized sport in 1989.

== BMX racing milestones ==
Note: Professional first are on the national level unless otherwise indicated.

Milestone	Event details
Started Racing:	April 1981 at eight years old. He started a week after brother Alan because he had soccer practice the weekend Alan raced. Alan described how great racing was and Brian went with him the next week.
Sanctioning Body:	
First race bike:	
First race result:	Probably DNF. In his first moto the chain came off his bike and he stood in the middle of the track and cried because he did not know how to place it back on.
First win (local):	
First sponsor:	1982 JF&S Plumbing.
First national win:	
Turned Professional:	September 1991 at 19 years old, shortly after the National Bicycle League (NBL) Grandnationals.
First Professional race result:	Third place in "A" pro at the American Bicycle Association (ABA) Fall Nationals in Yorba Linda, California on October 27, 1991 (Day 2)
First Professional win:	In "A" Pro at the NBL Christmas Classic in Columbus, Ohio on December 29, 1991
First Junior Men/Pro* race result:	See "First Professional race result" above.
First Junior Men/Pro win:	See "First Professional win"
First Senior Pro** race result:	At the ABA Gold Cup Championships West in Reno, Nevada on October 4, 1992. He moved himself up to "AA" pro despite needing an additional $500 to be graduated madatorally. He won his very first "AA" Pro moto.
First Senior Pro win:	
Height and weight at height of his career: (1992–1998)	Ht:6' 1" Wt:165 lbs.(1992)
Retired:	Retired: 2001. At a "La Revolusion" freestyle contest he decided to quit racing. According to a defgrip.net interview in 2007 the specific reason he gave up racing to devote full-time to dirt jumping is that racing ceased to be fun. "....it became less about racing and more about doing squats at the gym."

*In the NBL "B" Pro/Super Class/"A" Pro/Junior Elite Men depending on the era; in the ABA it is "A" Pro. **In the NBL it is "AA" Pro/Elite Men; in the ABA it is "AA" Pro.

=== Career factory and major bike shop sponsors ===
Note: This listing only denotes the racer's primary sponsors. At any given time a racer could have numerous ever changing co-sponsors. Primary sponsorships can be verified by BMX press coverage and sponsor's advertisements at the time in question. When possible exact dates are used.

==== Amateur ====
- JF&S Plumbing: 1982–1983
- Wheel Power Bike Shop: 1983–1989
- S&M (Greg Scott & Chris Moeller) Bicycles: 1989
- TNT/Goodtimes: March 1990-Mid 1990
- Cyclecraft: Mid 1990-December 1992

==== Professional ====
- Cyclecraft: 1990 – December 1992
- Hyper: January–April 1993
- Airwalk: May 1993 – 1994
- Schwinn/Airwalk: 1995–1998
- Schwinn: 1998-November 2000
- Airwalk/Fit Bike Company: November 2000 – 2003 Airwalk drops Foster in 2003.
- Fit Bikes/Fox Racing/Primo: 2003–present

=== Career bicycle motocross titles ===
Note: Listed are District, State/Provincial/Department, Regional, National, and International titles in italics. "Defunct" refers to the fact of that sanctioning body in question no longer existing at the start of the racer's career or at that stage of his/her career. Depending on point totals of individual racers, winners of Grand Nationals do not necessarily win National titles. Series and one off Championships are also listed in block.

==== Amateur/Junior Men ====
National Bicycle Association (NBA)

- None

National Bicycle League (NBL)

- 1990 18& Over Expert Grandnational Champion
- 1991 18 & Over Expert NBL National No.1

American Bicycle Association (ABA)

- 1988 16 Expert Grandnational Champion

Fédération Internationale Amateur de Cyclisme (FIAC)*

- 1990 17 boys Second Place World Champion

International Bicycle Motocross Federation (IBMXF)*

- None

Union Cycliste Internationale (UCI)*

- None

*See note in professional section
Championships.

==== Professional/Elite Men ====
National Bicycle Association (NBA)

- None (defunct)

National Bicycle League (NBL)

- 1992 Superclass/"B"-Pro Grandnational Champion
- 1992 Superclass/"B"-Pro National No.1 (Racing)
- 1994 Summer Spectacular Series Champion
- 1995 "AA" Pro National No.3
- 1996 NBL Dirt Circuit Champion (Dirt Jumping)

American Bicycle Association (ABA)

- 1994 "AA" Pro US Open East Champion
- 1995 ABA "Pros in Paradise" Champion. (Racing)
- 1996, 1997 ABA King of Dirt (KOD) Champion (Dirt Jumping)

United States Bicycle Motocross Association (USBA)

- None

International Bicycle Motocross Federation (IBMXF)*

- None

Fédération Internationale Amateur de Cyclisme (FIAC)*

- None (FIAC did not have a strictly professional division during its existence)

Union Cycliste Internationale (UCI)*

- 1995 Elite Men Silver Medal World Cup Champion

*Note: Beginning in 1991 the IBMXF and FIAC had been holding joint World Championship events as a transitional phase in merging which began in earnest in 1993. Beginning with the 1996 season the IBMXF and FIAC completed the merger and both ceased to exist as independent entities being integrated into the UCI. Beginning with the 1997 World Championships held in Brighton, England the UCI would officially hold and sanction BMX World Championships and with it inherited all precedents, records, streaks, etc. from both the IBMXF and FIAC.

=== Notable accolades ===
- Named one of the ten hottest and fastest rookie pros of 1992 by BMX Plus! magazine.
- Voted the "ABA Pro of the Year" in 1995

=== BMX product lines ===
- 1996 Airwalk Foster Bros. Signature shoes. This product was co-endorsed by his brother Alan.
- 1997 Schwinn Brian Foster Blue Falcon Frameset

Product Evaluation:

Snap BMX Magazine June 1998, vol. 4, issue 4, no. 23, p. 48.

- 2000 Schwinn Brian Foster Signature Series complete bicycle.

Product Evaluation:

- 2001 Schwinn Brian Foster Super Stock Signature Series complete bicycle.

Product Evaluation:

- 2003 Fit Brian Foster Street Frame

Product Evaluation:

- 2004 Fit Brian Foster Signature Model Bicycle

Product Evaluation:

=== Significant injuries ===
- Broke collarbone in a race in New Jersey when he was thirteen years old in 1985.
- Tore anterior cruciate ligament and cartilage in left knee on March 1, 1997, at Sheep Hills. He damaged it after a failed attempt at a mid air "360" and he landed wrong on his left foot. The wind blew him off course during the Schwinn photography session. As a result, he missed both the ABA Winternationals and the Cactus Cup jumping contest. He was laid up for four weeks after surgery.
- Broke hand racing at the NBL Christmas Classic in Columbus, Ohio on December 28, 1997 (Day 1). He sat out the next day.
- Hurt shoulder in the Pro Open Main in a pile up crash right in front of a jump in the second straight at the NBL Easter Classic National in Sarasota, Florida during the weekend of April 4, 1999.
- Broke a bone in his wrist at the CFB Round II freestyle contest in the Summer of 2002. He was out for approximately three weeks
- Had his bursa sack removed after pronounced infected swelling on his knee after he struck it against his handle bars in late 2002 before he went with the Fit team to Spain. He was laid up for approximately four weeks.

=== Miscellaneous ===
- Foster once held a job painting bicycle frames at one of his past sponsors, Cycle Craft. What makes this unique is that Foster is color blind. He explains how he got the job in an interview in the March/April 1997 issue of Snap BMX Magazine:
  Snap Magazine: How'd you get a job painting bikes if you're color blind?
  Brian Foster: (laughter)Side note: I don't think they knew. I went there just to help out working with bikes and the next ting you know they're like, "Do you know how to paint?" "Yeah, sure." And I started painting. The only time I ran into trouble was late at night when I was by myself and there was no purple paint--I just mixed some blue and some red and see what I came up with (more laughter).
  Side note: Cyclecraft knew he was colorblind, and didn't care. They also miss their friend. -CB-
- Brian Foster came very close to becoming ABA National No.1 pro in 1995 Despite a significant gap in points between him and the leaders John Purse and Gary Ellis going into the ABA Grandnationals. He closed that gap greatly at the grandnationals with the great aid of both John Purse and Gary Ellis, defying his reputation of being his best at important races high pressure races. Brian handled the pressure better and was able to past the fourth place racer in his semi final and qualify for the main. He had his fate in his hands enough so that in the "AA" pro main he need only a fifth or sixth-place finish to win the title. The thinking was that there was no way he would finish in the back of the pack. Foster ended up eighth in his first "AA" pro main after crashing into a pile up ahead of him. In the second run of the finals Foster came in last after getting into a wreck in turn three with Jamie Staff as Foster was in second. Meanwhile, Frenchman Christophe Lévêque who was in a distant fourth place in points at the start of the Grandnationals. In the third main Foster ended up in sixth position after the first straight, then managed to move up to second place behind Lévêque with the other contenders for the Grand National win-but not the title-Matt Hadan and Mike King in the rear. Foster only needed to remain in his position and let Lévêque have the Grand National win while Foster took the National #1 title. However, Foster's front wheel slid out and he crashed and the rest of the pack collided into him. After the scramble to pick up their bicycles and head for the finish Foster had come in seventh position. Foster had lost the Number one Plate. In another controversy Gary Ellis was rewarded National #1 instead of Christophe Lévêque due to the rule at the time that no foreigner could win the ABA National Number One Pro title.

=== Other significant sibling combinations in BMX ===
- Brent & Brian Patterson
- Ronnie & Richie Anderson
- Mike & Eddy King
- Eric & Robby Rupe
- Richard & Gary Houseman

=== Post BMX career ===
Brian Foster is currently a doctor who specializes in physical therapy. He was inducted into the USA BMX Hall Of Fame in 2018 as part of the Racing category.

== BMX press magazine interviews and articles ==
- "Foster Bros.", Go, August 1991, vol. 2, issue 10, p. 52. Two separate interviews of Brian and his brother Alan Foster.
- "Young Guns II", BMX Plus!, June 1992, vol. 17, no. 6, p. 27. One of ten rookie pro racers given a short listing profile article.
- "The Foster Files", BMX Plus!, March 1993, vol. 16, no. 3, p. 63. Joint interview with his brother Alan Foster.
- "face: Brian Foster", Ride BMX Magazine, December 1993, vol. 2, issue 6, no. 8, p. 30.
- "Double Interview: Christophe Lévêque & Brian Foster", BMX Plus!, April 1996, vol. 19, no. 4, p. 71. Two separate interviews of the events of the controversial 1995 ABA Grandnational, including Foster's losing his bid for National No.1.
- "Brian Foster Interview", Snap BMX Magazine, March/April 1997, vol. 4, issue 2, no. 15, p. 62.
- "tabletop how-to's:", Snap BMX Magazine, September/October 1997, vol. 4, issue 5, no. 18, p. 43. Foster gives a brief description on how to properly execute a "tabletop" maneuver.
- "Q&A: Have you ever cheated racing?", Snap BMX Magazine, May 1999, vol. 6, issue 3, no. 31, p. 24. One of 10 separate interviews of different racers including Matt Hadan and Dale Holmes asking if they ever cheated during a race.
- "Brian Foster", Snap BMX Magazine, May 1999, vol. 6, issue 5, no. 31, poster back.
- "Brian Foster", Snap BMX Magazine, May 2000, vol. 7, issue 5, no. 43, poster back. Interview conducted by his brother Alan Foster.
- "Double Down", Snap BMX Magazine, August 2000, vol. 7, issue 8, no. 46, p. 80. Brian discusses his double knee operation in April 2000.
- "Wasted Land", BMX Plus!, October 2000, vol. 23, no. 10, p. 78. Foster's editorial article about the paradoxical effects of shrinking areas to dirt jump or to street/freestyle and the increasing popularity of the sport.
- "Ask Brian", Transworld BMX, October November 2002, vol. 9, issue 11, no. 73, p. 40. Foster answers submitted questions by the readers of Transworld BMX.
- "Four Pros & 3 wishes", Transworld BMX, July 2004, vol. 11, issue 7, no. 93, p. 20. He is one of four whimsical interviews with dirt jumping pros asked what are the three things they would have either inside or outside the BMX world. Brian Castillo, Adam Banton and Todd Walkowiak are the other subjects.
- "Brian Foster and the TWBMX Ten", Transworld BMX, November 2004, vol. 11, issue 11, no. 97, p. 98.

== BMX magazine covers ==
Note: Only magazines that were in publication at the time of the racer's career(s) are listed unless specifically noted.

Minicycle/BMX Action & Super BMX:

- None

Bicycle Motocross Action & Go:

- None

BMX Plus!:

- March 1991, vol. 14, no. 3, in virtual tie in between Dave Cullinan (4) in foreground outside and Christophe Lévêque in background inside.
- March 1993, vol. 16, no. 3, (6) with brother Alan Foster (4) In bottom insert Mike King.
- August 1993, vol. 16, no. 8, (1) on the left hand side slightly behind Eric Carter (25). In insert Freestyler Matt Hoffman.
- May 1994, vol. 17, no. 5, in second behind Gary Ellis (1) in the lead and ahead of brother Alan Foster (4) in third.
- July 1994 Vol.17 No.7. In insert four girls modeling T-shirts
- July 1995 Vol.18 No.7. In top insert three girls modeling T-shirts; in middle left insert a full suspension Mongoose BMX bicycle.
- August 1996, vol. 19, no. 8, In right insert. In main insert Andy Contes (1) along with two unidentifieds (3) & (14).
- February 1997, vol. 20, no. 2, (3) in middle insert in second; Randy Stumpfhauser (200) leading; Charles Townsend (10) in fourth; unidentified (16) in third. In top right insert dirt jumper Matt Beringer. In bottom right insert Kiyomi Waller (403). In bottom left insert various helmets.

Total BMX:

- None

Bicycles and Dirt:

- None

Ride BMX Magazine: UK & US versions

- Ride US: February/March 1996 issue 20
- Ride US: May 2004
- Ride UK: March 2008 issue 113

Snap BMX Magazine & Transworld BMX:

- May 1998, vol. 5, issue 3, no. 22, (Snap)
- May 2000, vol. 7, issue 5, no. 43, In top insert. In main image Danny Nelson (1) slightly behind Matt Pohlkamp (7) and Eric Abbadessa (9).
- August 2002, vol. 9, issue 8, no. 70, (TWBMX)

BMX Freedom:

- October 2002

BMX Rider UK:

- November 2003 No.16

Moto Mag:

- None

BMX World:

NBA World: & NBmX World (The official NBA/NBmxA membership publication):

- None

Bicycles Today & BMX Today (The official NBL membership publication under two names):

ABA Action, American BMXer, BMXer (The official ABA membership publication under three names):

USBA Racer (The official USBA membership publication):

- None

== X Games competition history ==
GOLD (1) SILVER (3) BRONZE (1)
YEAR	X GAMES	EVENTS	RANK	MEDAL
1996	Summer X Games II	BMX Dirt	3rd	Bronze medal
1997	Summer X Games III	BMX Dirt	2nd	Silver medal
1998	Summer X Games IV	BMX Dirt	1st	Gold medal
1999	Summer X Games V	BMX Dirt	2nd	Silver medal
2001	Summer X Games VII	Downhill BMX	2nd	Silver medal
2002	Summer X Games VIII	BMX Park	7th	
2002	Summer X Games VIII	BMX Dirt	6th	
2002	Summer X Games VIII	Downhill BMX		
2003	Summer X Games IX	BMX Park	10th	
2003	Summer X Games IX	BMX Dirt	7th	
2003	Summer X Games IX	Downhill BMX	11th	
2004	Summer X Games X	BMX Dirt	9th	
2005	Summer X Games XI	BMX Dirt	7th	
