= Mike King (BMX rider) =

American bicycle motocross rider (born 1969)

Personal information
- Full name: Michael Allen King
- Born: June 30, 1969 (age 57) Washington, D.C., United States
- Height: 5 ft 10 in (1.78 m)
- Weight: 182 lb (83 kg)

Cycling career
- Sport: Cycling
- Current team: Retired
- Disciplines: Bicycle motocross (BMX); Mountain bike racing (MTB)
- Role: Racer
- Rider type: BMX: Off road MTB: Dual slalom, Downhill

Amateur teams
- 1979: Wheels 'n' Things
- 1980-1981: Torker Inc.
- 1983: Bicycle Parts Pacific/Dirt Slinger
- 1984: Redline Engineering
- 1984-1986: Huffy Corporation
- 1986-1987: Haro Designs/Bicycles

Professional teams
- 1987-1990: Haro Designs/Bicycles
- 1991-1992: Redline Engineering
- 1993: Balance Cycles
- 1994-1998: GT Racing
- 1999-2004: Haro Bikes/Lee Dunguress
Medal record
Representing United States
Men's mountain bike racing
World Championships
Gold medal – first place	1993 Métabief	Downhill
Bronze medal – third place	1995 Kirchzarten	Downhill

Michael Allen King (born June 30, 1969) is an "Old School/Mid School" former professional Bicycle Motocross (BMX) racer whose prime competitive years were from 1984 to 1998 and is also a former Mountain Bike (MTB) racer who prime competitive years in that discipline were 1993 to 2004.

== Biography ==
Mike King is the younger sibling of one of the most respected brother combinations of BMX racing: Eddy & Mike King. Of the two King Brothers, Mike had a more dominating career in terms of national titles he won as an amateur and professional. As with most brother combinations the younger brother often live in the shadow of the elder and Eddy King was a well-respected rider with a long career. Mike came out of his brother's shadow when he won his first national title when he became the American Bicycle Association's national number one amateur for 1984 and again in 1987. Mike turned to the pro class in 1988 and earned the Rookie of Year honor and the National number one pro title. Still without a nickname at the time, although he was also known as "Mikey" by many, he became known as "The Snake" by his competitors for his relentless ability to pass riders during a race. In 1993, Mike took to mountain bike racing and instantly found success in his rookie year by winning the National Off-Road Bicycle Association’s Dual Slalom National Championships and the coveted Union Cycliste Internationale Downhill Mountain Bike World Championship title in Métabief, France. After multiple international and domestic victories, world cup wins, and national championships, Mike retired from professional cycling in 2005.

In 2006, Mike was hired by USA Cycling as the BMX program director and lead Team USA at the 2008 Summer Olympics in Beijing, China and 2012 Summer Olympics in London, England. During that time, Team USA brought home three Olympic medals to BMX.

Mike was inducted into the National BMX Hall of Fame in 1999 and the U.S. Bicycling Hall of Fame in 2013. Currently, Mike works for the City of Rock Hill, SC as the BMX Supervisor of the Novant Health BMX Supercross facility as well consulting and brand ambassador roles in the bicycle industry with companies Vee Tire Co, Felt Bicycles, Turbine, and XRCEL.

== Racing career milestones ==
Note: Professional first are on the national level unless otherwise indicated.

Started racing: June 29, 1975, one day shy of his sixth birthday and approximately six and a half months after his elder brother Eddy started racing on January 15, 1975 at the Silver Wing BMX track in San Diego, California. Went on a one and a half year hiatus from National racing for most of the 1981 season (he raced at least in one national event, the National Bicycle Motocross Association (NBmxA) 1981 Rancho National near El Cajon, California on August 16) and into the first half of 1982 sticking to only racing on the local level. He returned to National level racing during the 1982 season. Dropped out briefly again for six months in 1983 but returned permanently for the November 1983 ABA Fall Nationals. After his hiatus from racing BMX nationals he came back with renewed commitment stating:

"When I was 13 I decided I wanted to make BMX my career!"--Mike King, American BMXer July 1985

Milestone	Event Details
Sanctioning body:	Independent track
Home sanctioning body district(s):	National Bicycle Association (NBA) District "S" (San Diego, California) 1975-1981; American Bicycle Association (ABA) California 21 (CA-21) 1985
First race bike:	
First race result:	
First win (local):	
First sponsor:	Wheels 'n' Things
First national win:	
Turned professional:	December 1987 at 18 years old. His last amateur race was The ABA Grand National in November 1987. He won the 17 & Over Expert Class.
First professional race result:	Second in "B" Pro at the National Bicycle League (NBL) Christmas National in Columbus, Ohio on December 27, 1987. He won USD$325. or USD 611.09 equivalent in 2008.Cost of Living Calculator
First professional win:	At the American Bicycle Association (ABA) Ozark National in Pine Bluff, Arkansas on January 27, 1988 in "A" pro. He won USD 435, the equivalent to USD 817.92 in 2008.
First Junior Men/pro* race result:	See "First professional race result"
First Junior Men/pro win:	See "First professional win"
First Senior pro** race result:	First in "AA" Pro at the ABA Great Northwest Nationals in Vancouver, Washington on March 27, 1988. He won all three runnings of the "AA" Pro main, the first racer to do so on his first outing as a "AA" pro. He won USD 870 (USD 1,570.85 in 2008). He won Pro Open that day as well, doubling. He won USD 315 (USD 568.76 in 2008). Indeed, he also scored a rare double-double that weekended winning "A" pro and Pro Open on Saturday and then after transferring to the senior "AA" pro class won it and Pro Open again
First Senior pro win:	See above.
Height and weight at height of his career (1984–1989):	Ht:5'9"-11" Wt:~182 lbs.
Retired:	2002 from BMX racing. 2006 from almost all MTB competition.

=== Career factory and major bicycle shop sponsors ===
Note: This listing only denotes the racer's primary sponsors. At any given time a racer could have numerous co-sponsors. Primary sponsorships can be verified by BMX press coverage and sponsor's advertisements at the time in question. When possible exact dates are given.

==== Amateur ====
- Wheels 'n' Things: 1979-December 1979
- Torker Inc. (Johnson Engineering): January 1980-December 1981
- Bicycle Parts Pacific/Dirt Slinger: November 1983-March 1984
- Redline Engineering: March 3 to March 10, 1984. Very briefly with Redline and only on the support team at this time. He never got a chance to wear the Redline uniform however before accepting a better offer from Huffy Corporation.
- Huffy Corporation: March 11, 1984-April 1986
- Haro Designs/Bicycles: April 1986-November 30, 1990. Mike King would turn pro with this sponsor.

==== Professional ====
- Haro Designs/Bicycles: April 1986-November 30, 1990. Left under very bad circumstances. It even got personal with Bob Haro himself beginning in May 1990. He even contemplated quitting BMX after the 1990 ABA Grand National. However, by 2000 he would mend fences with Bob Haro and would be sponsored by them again by then.
- Redline Engineering: January 1, 1991-December 1992
- Balance Cycles: January 1993-December 1993
- GT (Gary Turner) Bicycles: 1994-1999
- Haro Designs/Lee Pipes: 1999-2001

=== Career bicycle motocross titles ===
Note: Listed are District, State/Provincial, Regional, National, and International titles in italics. "Defunct" refers to the fact of that sanctioning body in question no longer existing at the start of the racer's career or at that stage of his/her career. Depending on point totals of individual racers, winners of Grand Nationals do not necessarily win National titles. Series and one off Championships are also listed in block.

==== Amateur ====
National Bicycle Association (NBA)

Bicycle Motocross Association of San Diego (BMXAOSD)

- 1976 No.2
- 1984 14 Expert Tijuana BMX Cup Champion

*The Tijuana BMX Cup was a one time event held in Tijuana, Baja California, Mexico, and sponsored by the International Cycling Organization, Coca-Cola, Carta Blanca, and the State Secretary of Tourism of Baja California. The BMX Association of San Diego after the major BMX governing bodies, the NBL and ABA, declined to sanction the event, ran it. As a result, while heavily promoted it had sparse participation with only 200 racers comprising about 22 motos (including 13 professionals from the United States) out of the hoped for 6000 tourist. A promoter of the race Phil Bartel had anticipated making enough money to build three or four tracks in Tijuana. He instead lost US$5,000. The reason for the low turn out are attributed to the lack of ABA and NBL points for racers touring those circuits, negating an important motivation to attend. A further disincentive was the high entrance fees of $20 and the mere fact that it was in Mexico, a nation with foreign (to Americans) standards of culture and law, even though it was held only a half mile from the border inside Mexico. In May 1984 the BMXA of San Diego merged with the ABA.

National Bicycle League (NBL)

- 1984 15 Expert National No.1
- 1985 16 Expert Grandnational Champion
- 1985 16 Expert National No.1
- 1986 17 Expert Grandnational Champion
- 1986 17 Expert National No.1
- 1987 18 & Over Expert and 16 & Over Open Grandnational Champion
- 1987 18 & Over Expert National No.1.

American Bicycle Association (ABA)

- 1984 15 Expert Grandnational Champion
- 1984 National No.1
- 1985 15 Expert Winter Season California District 21 (CA-21) District Age Group (DAG) No.1
- 1985 16 Expert National No.1*
- 1987 17 & Over Expert U.S. Gold Cup West Champion.
- 1987 15 & Over Boys Honda East Vs. West Shootout "Future Pro" Champion.
- 1987 17 & Over Grandnational Champion
- 1987 National 17 & Over Expert No. 1 & Overall National No.1 Amateur. He won a Gaston speed boat as a prize.

*Beginning in the 1985 season the ABA made it possible to earn an amateur national no.1 plate in the age group of the racer, similar to NBL practice. However, the ABA still had an overall National no.1 amateur, which in 1985 was Brent Romero.

International Bicycle Motocross Federation (IBMXF)

- 1981 11 Expert International Champion
- 1985 15 Expert Murray World Cup IV Champion.
- 1986 16 Expert Murray World Cup V Champion.
- 1987 17 Expert Vision Street Wear World Cup* Champion
- 1987 Supercross World Champion**

*The Vision Street Wear World Cup was the direct descendant of the Murry World Cup. Murray stopped sponsoring the World Cup after the fifth 1986 edition due to the failure of Murray of Ohio bicycle company and the NBL to come to an agreement about the sponsorship fee Murray would have had to pay the NBL. If Murray continued its sponsor ship, the 1987 addition would have been the sixth (VI) in the series.
**In Europe, Supercross is a pro/am class in which amateurs could win a limited amount of money but still retain their amateur status. Eddy King's amateur status in the NBL and ABA was unaffected in part because no prize money was awarded. However, this class is different from the Pro World Championship which was held by Gary Ellis in 1987.

Independent Events and Series

- 1983 14 Expert Third Place Jag BMX World Superbowl Championship Champion

==== Professional ====
National Bicycle Association (NBA)

- None

National Bicycle League (NBL)

- 1989 "A" Pro Grandnational Champion

American Bicycle Association (ABA)

- 1988 National No.1 Pro
- 1988 Pro Gold Cup West Champion
- 1994 Pro Cruiser Grandnational Champion
- 1995 Pro Cruiser Grandnational Champion

United States Bicycle Motocross Association (USBA)

- None

International Bicycle Motocross Federation (IBMXF)

- None

Pro Series Championships and Invitationals

- 1988 Bicross International de Paris Bercy Champion (King of Bercy).

The International BMX Race of Bercy Paris was an invitational race sponsored by the Association Francaise de Bi-Crossing (AFB), the French BMX sanctioning body and was held in Bercy an eastern area in the city of Paris, France north of the river Seine. It was sponsored by the Yoplait Yogurt company. As such it was also known as the Bicross de Paris Challenge Yop Champion (The Paris Yoplait BMX Challenge) in which American and English pros as well as French pros were brought together to compete in a single race. As with the 1985 addition, which Tommy Brackens won, it was a hit in France with tickets sold out three months in advance.

=== Notable accolades ===
- Named the fifth (5) of the 25 Hottest amateurs in BMX racing by a 1984 survey conducted by BMX Plus! for the opinions of four prominent figures in BMX: Two racers, Brent Patterson and Mike Poulson; and two team officials: Dr. Gary Scofield of GT, Howard Wharthon of Diamond Back.
- Named one of eight top amateurs deemed top "Pros of the Future" by Super BMX & Freestyle magazine along with Billy Griggs, Eric Carter Doug Davis, Matt Hadan Brent Romero, Darwin Griffin and Brad Birdwell.
- Named one of the new BMX Action's "Terrible Ten" top amateurs and future professionals for 1986.
- Named number three of BMX Action magazine's "The Terrible Ten" of 1987 of top amateurs and future professionals.
- Named BMX Action's Rookie of the Year (ROY) for 1988 due to his outstanding first professional season in 1988.
- Mike King is a 1999 ABA BMX Hall of Fame Inductee. His brother Eddy King is a 1989 Inductee.

=== Significant injuries ===
- Broke right ankle and tore ligaments in a Pro Open main crash at the end of the second straight at the 1988 ABA Grand Nationals in Oklahoma City, Oklahoma on November 27, 1988. He was able to continue racing and come in second in the third and final AA pro main and win the Pro National No.1 plate. Recovering, he missed the NBL Christmas Classic National in late December.
- Broke two fingers on his right hand on Saturday, March 16 at the 1991 ABA Supernationals in El Paso, Texas in his first Pro Open moto. He had veered into the fence besides the track after his jersey was caught on his handlebars, causing him to lose control. Said he would return to racing at the ABA US Nationals in Lemoore, California race four weeks later. He was.
- Injured right knee on June 19 at the 1991 European Challenge Cup VIII in Slagharen, the Netherlands. Laid up for three weeks.
- Broke ankle at the 1992 ABA Supernationals.

=== Miscellaneous ===
- Named number three on the list of the "Dirtiest Riders in BMX" in the history of BMX in the June 1992 issue of BMX Plus!

=== Introduction of clipless pedals ===
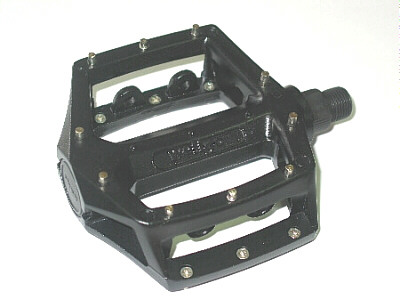
Wellgo Quill Platform Pedal. This design is practically identical to the Shimano "DX" pedals first introduced in 1981 for BMX racing.

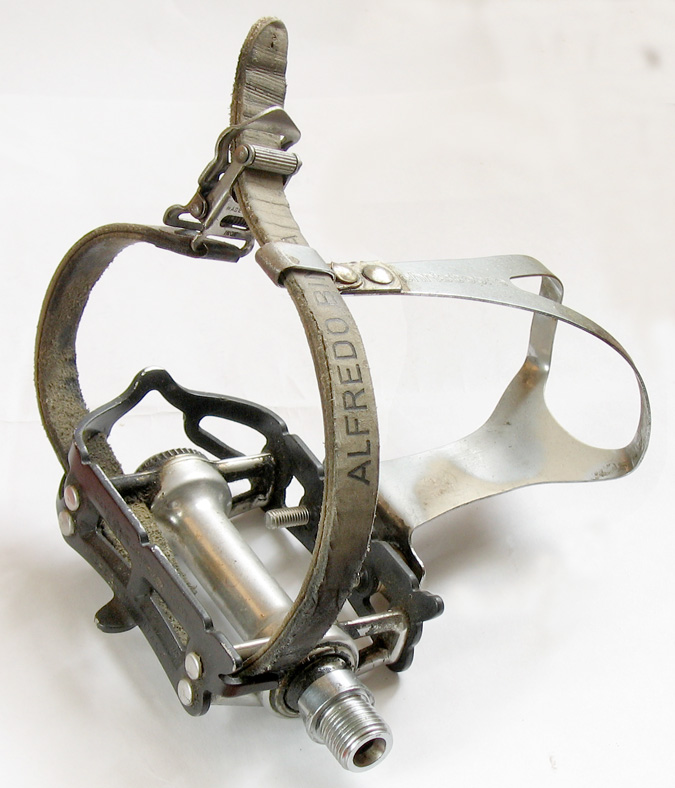
Bicycle pedal with standard toe clip and toe strap, quill road type. Early 1980s.

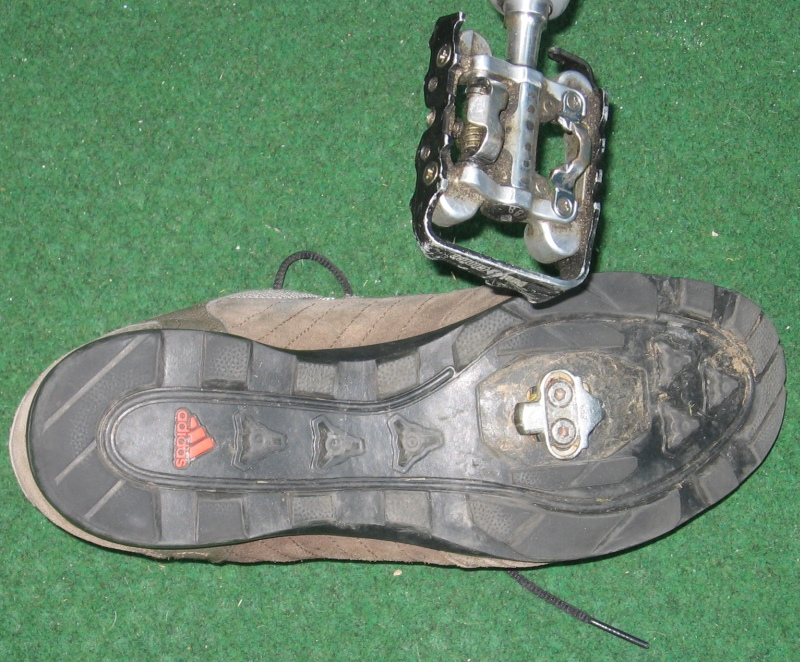
Road Cycling version of clipless pedals: SPD Dual Choice with shoe

Mike King, along with fellow racer Brian Lopes, is credited with starting the Mountain Bike racing SPD clipless pedals trend in BMX racing starting in the mid-1990s, moving away from the then standard platform and cage pedals for racing. They both raced with them at the ABA Fall Nationals in Burbank, California on October 22, 1994. There is controversy in BMX over the use of clipless pedals, including that rider can not maneuver their feet off and on the pedals in turns when the racer wants to set up for a pass, or stabilize his or her bicycle in a low-speed, tight turn. This reduces the opportunity to pass riders in the turns, as was commonplace in the 1980s when cage and platform pedals were the norm. Some say that clipless pedals reduce the excitement of BMX races, with the racers "following the leader" and only having the ability to pass on straights. Despite the respect given by the BMX world to Mike King and Brian Lopes, clipless pedals were not used by the majority of pro or amateur racers until the end of the year 2000. It was the late Mario Soto, a young and highly talented rookie pro who broke into the Senior pro ranks and started immediately doing very well despite his comparatively small size and being totally new to the senior pro ranks, that prompted the move. He attributed part of his success to his use of clipless pedals. Today clipless pedals are the norm in BMX racing. Wade Bootes a highly respected Senior Pro was an early adopter of clipless pedals and helped with the move to them.

Another criticism of clipless pedals is that they lead to more injuries since the feet can not be readily be freed from the pedals despite their quick release feature. The racer is prevented from either stabilizing his bike by placing one foot on the ground to prevent a crash or brace himself quickly if a crash is inevitable, leading to more frequent and serious crashes involving leg and foot injury. On August 20, 2007 professional BMX racer Bubba Harris completely dislocated ankle at the talus bone in Beijing, China on the official Olympic BMX racing track during the first run of his Time Trial in the "rhythm section", a series of closely but evenly spaced jumps that you use gravity and "body English" to navigate and maintain speed. He was launched sideways by his momentum into the air, coming down on the back side of a jump with his foot still clipped into an SPD pedal. Doctors almost amputated his foot. With platform pedals his feet would have not been tied to the bicycle which acted like an anchor. As of this time he is still recovering. He expects to race the NBL Christmas Classic BMX race at the end of December 2007. He was able to fulfill that expectation, but he did not make the mains. Mishaps like this, though usually much less catastrophic, have ignited debate in the BMX racing community. This is particularly true among "Old School" veterans of the 1970s and 1980s who raced with caged and platform pedals. Generally the only danger with pedals of these types was that if the rider slipped a pedal, the teeth of the pedal could gouge his shin, thigh or ankle, unless the rider has protective padding.

In a January 7, 2009 interview with Gary Haselhorst on the BMX discussion site "BMX Action Online" Mike King said he went to clipless pedals because, "My motivation to use SPD pedals/shoes had to do with the ABA introducing a pro time trial in 1995. Then it helped me when I was racing mountain bikes. However, I think the clip debate is overrated. I don’t think kids under 10 years old should be racing in them and I believe this has affected how tracks are designed today. They are too many cookie cutter type tracks in this country and this has slowed the progression of the sport.

=== Other significant sibling combinations in BMX ===
- Ronnie & Richie Anderson
- Brent & Brian Patterson
- Eric & Robby Rupe
- Gary & Richard Houseman
- Alan & Brian Foster

== BMX press magazine interviews and articles ==
- "Torker Team" BMX Plus! May 1980 Vol.3 No.5 pg.20 Joint interview with his brother Eddy King, Clint Miller, Mike Agueilera, and Jason Jensen; his teammates on the Torker BMX racing team.
- "NBL National Number 1's" Bicycles Today January 1985 Vol.7 No.1 pg.16 Short biographical blurb in sanctioning body newspaper for becoming NBL National No.1 15 Expert in 1984.
- "Mike King: From BMX dropout to ABA National Number One." BMX Plus! March 1985 Vol.8 No.3 pg.50
- "On Top! A look at being #1" American BMXer July 1985 Vol.7 No.5 pg.16 a photo caption montage of Huffy's Mike King and Hutch's Jason Johnson.
- "Two of a Kind" Super BMX & Freestyle November 1985 Vol.12 No.11 pg.30 A duel interview with Huffy teammate Brent Romero.
- "Bros. Eddy & Mike" BMX Action January 1988 Vol.13 No.1 pg.30 Joint interview with his brother Eddy King.
- "The Champs: Mike King" BMX Plus! April 1988 Vol.11 No.4 pg.32 One of six mini articles of the six ABA National No.1 winners of 1987.
- "Mike King #1 Amateur: The Best BMXer ever?" American BMXer December 1988 Vol.10 No.11 pg.22
- "Mike King: ROY" BMX Action February 1989 Vol.14 No.2 pg.40 Interview on Mike King becouming BMX Action's professional Rookie of the Year for 1988.
- "Mikey's Ride" BMX Plus! June 1989 Vol.12 No.6 pg.75 Description of Mike King's BMX racing bicycle as well as brief biograph.
- "On the Cover: Mike King" BMX Action August 1989 Vol.14 No.8 pg.52
- "Fast Talk: Mike King" BMX Plus! October 1989 Vol.12 No.9 pg.61 Mini two question interview on the differences between the amateur and professional classes.
- "Numero Uno, Mike King" American BMXer November 1989 Vol.11 No.10 pg.36
- "Trading Places: Mikey King and Billy Griggs tell all!"BMX Plus! June 1991 Vol.14 No.6 pg.62 A joint interview with Billy Griggs.
- "Faster Talk: Redline Pro Mike King" BMX Plus! June 1992 Vol.15 No.6 pg.21 Short sidebar interview about his training and a new Redline suspension bicycle.

== BMX magazine covers ==
Bicycle Motocross News:

- None

Minicycle/BMX Action & Super BMX:

- November 1985 Vol.12 No.11 with teammate Brent Romero. In inset Eddie Fiola. (SBMX&F)
- November 1988 Vol.15 No.11 with teammate Pete Loncarevich in insert. In separate inserts Eric Carter; Jeff Donnell & Charlie Davidson; freestyler Eddie Fiola. (SBMXF)

Bicycle Motocross Action & Go:

- May 1986 Vol.11 No.5 (BMXA)
- September 1988 Vol.13 No.9 with Rick Palmer, Greg Hill & unidentified on the gate. (BMXA)
- August 1989 Vol.14 No.8 (BMXA)
- February 1990 Vol.1 No.1 (Go) (Official Premiere Issue)
- November 1990 Vol.2 Iss.1 behind Steve Veltman, Billy Griggs and Traves Chipres. In insert John Paul Rogers (Go).
- May 1991 Vol.2 No.7 with Billy Griggs (Go).

BMX Plus!:

- November 1986 Vol.9 No.11 in right insert. In separate inserts: Freestylers Randy Tishchmann (left) & Eddie Fiola (top). Also Radical Rick cartoon at bottom.
- August 1989 Vol.12 No.8 in main image obscured in black/silver helmet with no."1". In foreground Eric Carter (Schwinn) with Travis Chipres (Mongoose), Matt Hadan (obscured silver black/blue helmet), Billy Griggs (Redline), and GT's Mike Ellis. Also in top insert with aforementioned.
- April 1992 Vol.15 No.4 with J.D. Finney.
- March 1993 Vol.18 No.3 In bottom insert. Main image: Brothers Alan Foster (4) and Brian Foster (6).
- March 1994 Vol.17 No.3 Second from right on the starting gate with fellow pros (5) Brian Lopes (first from right), Eric Carter (25) (on King's right), Steve Veltman, Pete Loncarevich (partly obscured) & and unidentified. In top insert Haro Monocoque BMX racing bicycle.

Total BMX (originally Published by the NBL's Bob Tedesco):

Bicycles and Dirt (Published by the ABA):

- None

Snap BMX Magazine & Transworld BMX:

NBA World & NBmXA World (The official NBA/NBmxA membership publication):

Bicycles Today & BMX Today (The Official NBL membership publication under two different names).

ABA Action, American BMXer, BMXer (The official ABA membership publication under two name changes):

- American BMXer September 1986 Vol.8 No.8
- American BMXer August 1987 Vol.9 No.7 (5) with unidentified (2).
- American BMXer December 1988 Vol.10 No.11
- American BMXer November 1989 Vol.11 No.10

USBA Racer (The official USBA membership publication):

== Post BMX career ==
- Began MTB in 1993 but raced BMX into 2002. From then he raced exclusively MTB until 2006. Currently he owns a restaurant/bar in San Diego, California that he had opened in February 2005 according to BMX News.com.
- In January 2007 he was selected by USA Cycling to be their Director of BMX Programs to develop the BMX team to represent the United States in the 2008 Beijing Olympics. Here is his letter to all USA Cycling Elite BMX Athletes dated May 10, 2007.
- On June 25, 2008 in his capacity and discretion of being the USA BMX Team Olympic Coach he chose Donny Robinson to the fourth member of the USA BMX Team to go to the 2008 Summer Olympics in Beijing, China to represent the USA along with Teammates Jill Kintner, Kyle Bennett, and Mike Day at BMX's debut in the Summer Olympics.

== MTB racing career ==
Started Racing: 1993 at age 24.

First race result:

Sanctioning Body:

=== Career MTB factory sponsors ===
Note: This listing only denotes the racer's primary sponsors. At any given time a racer could have numerous co-sponsors. Primary sponsorships can be verified by MTB press coverage and sponsor's advertisements at the time in question. When possible exact dates are given.

==== Amateur ====
- No Amateur status

==== Professional ====
- Balance Cycles: January 1993-December 1993
- GT (Gary Turner) Bicycles: 1994-1998
- Haro Bicycles: 1999-2004

=== Career mountain bike titles ===
Note: Listed are Regional, National and International titles.

==== Amateur ====
- No Amateur status

==== Professional ====
National Off-Road Bicycle Association (NORBA)

- 1993 Dual Slalom National Championship

Union Cycliste Internationale (UCI)

- 1993 World Championship Downhill Champion Gold Medalist
- 1995 World Championship Downhill Bronze Medalist
- 2002, 2003 Bronze Medal World Cup Champion

=== Significant MTB injuries ===
- Crashed and dislocated shoulder at the Grundig/UCI Mountain Bike World Cup in Snoqualmie Pass, Washington on June 28, 1998. Out several weeks.
