= Alan Foster (BMX rider) =

American BMX racer

Personal information
- Full name: Alan David Foster
- Nickname: "AF"
- Born: January 18, 1970 (age 56) Wilmington, Delaware
- Height: 1.8 m (5 ft 11 in)
- Weight: 79 kg (174 lb) (1993)

Cycling career
- Sport: Cycling
- Current team: Felt (retired)
- Discipline: Bicycle Motocross (BMX)
- Role: Racer/Team Manager
- Rider type: Off Road

Amateur teams
- 1982-1983: JF&S Plumbing
- 1983-1989: Wheel Power

Professional teams
- 1988-1989: Wheel Power
- 1989-1990: Huntington Valley Schwinn
- 1990: Slam Designs
- 1990-1992: ELF Manufacturing
- 1992-1993: TNT Racing
- 1993-1994: Airwalk
- 1994-1997: Airwalk/Schwinn
- 1997-1998: Airwalk/XS
- 1998-2002: Airwalk/Free Agent
- 2003-Present: Felt Bicycles

Alan David Foster (born January 18, 1970) is an American former professional "Mid School" Bicycle Motocross (BMX) racer and Dirt Jumper whose prime competitive years were from 1992 to 1999. His nickname was "AF", his initials.

== Racing career milestone ==
Note: Professional first are on the national level unless otherwise indicated.

Started Racing: In April 1981 in Newark, Delaware at the Lums Pond BMX track.

Sanctioning Body: National Bicycle League (NBL)

First race result: First place in 11 Beginner.

First sponsor: JF&S Plumbing

First national win:

Turned Professional: September 1988

First professional race result: Fourth place in "B" Pro at the National Bicycle League "War of the Stars" National in Memphis, Tennessee, on October 15, 1988. He won USD$40 [equivalent to about $109 in 2025]. He also came in third in Pro Award, winning $22.50 [equivalent to about $61 in 2025].

First professional win: In "B" pro at the NBL "War of the Stars" National in Orlando, Florida, on March 25, 1989. He won USD 300, the equivalent of USD 521.64 in 2007.

First Junior Men Pro* race result: See "First Professional race result"

First Junior Men Pro win: See "First Professional win"

First Senior Men Pro** race result: Sixth in "A" pro at the NBL Silver City Sensation National in Meridien, Connecticut, on July 29, 1989. He finished out of the money since the prize purse was only rewarded from first to fifth positions. The next day he came in seventh place, again out of the money. Hard times seem to have struck after that. He spent several weeks competing in Senior pro but not making the mains. Seven Weeks, 15 races without transferring out to the qualifying motos. As a result, after making the mains in "All Pro" (which was what the NBL was calling its Senior Pro class at the time. Junior Pro was "Superclass") at the NBL Cape Cod Classic in Cape Cod, Maryland, on June 16, 1990, at which come in 5th, he reclassified back to Junior pro in July 1990 due to being uncompetitive in the Senior division. His first race as junior pro again was in "A" pro at the ABA Midwest Nationals in Rockford, Illinois, on July 21, 1990. He came in sixth. He transferred back to Senior pro in approximately July 1991, approximately one year after he reclassified back to junior pro. However, once again he had a hard time in the Senior Pro division and reclassified again, racing in Superclass division at the NBL Grandnational in Louisville, Kentucky, on September 1, 1991. In all the time he had spent in Senior pro since July 29, 1989, and prior to the 1992 ABA Grandnationals the total number of Alan Foster making the mains was five. He turn back to the Senior Pro class to stay in 1992 at the ABA Gold Cup finals in October 1992 in Reno, Nevada.

First Senior Men Pro win: In "AA" Pro at the ABA So. Cal. Nationals in Del Mar, California, on January 23, 1993.

Retired: August 2003. The last race was the Downhill Class at the X-Games. He states that he simply lost the desire.

Height and weight: Ht:5'11" Wt:190 lbs (1993).

*In the NBL "B" Pro/Super Class/"A" Pro/Junior Elite Men depending on the era; in the ABA it is "A" Pro.
**In the NBL it is "AA" Pro/Elite Men; in the ABA it is "AA" Pro.

=== Sponsors ===
Note: This listing only denotes the racer's primary sponsors. At any given time a racer could have numerous ever-changing co-sponsors. Primary sponsorships can be verified by BMX press coverage and sponsor's advertisements at the time in question. When possible exact dates are used.

==== Amateur ====
- JF&S Plumbing: 1982-1983
- Wheel Power Bike Shop: 1983-September 1989. He would turn pro with this sponsor.

==== Professional ====
- Wheel Power Bike Shop: 1983-September 1989. Wheel Power dropped their team after the 1989 NBL Grandnationals
- Huntington Valley Schwinn: 1989-Late Summer 1990
- Slam Designs: October 1990-December 1990
- ELF (Extra Light Frames) Manufacturing: December 1990-November 1992
- TNT Racing: November 1992-April 1993
- Airwalk: May 1993-Mid 1994
- Schwinn/Airwalk: Mid 1994-December 1997
- Airwalk/XS: December 1997-December 1998
- Airwalk/Free Agent: December 1998 – 2002 His first race for Airwalk/Free agent was the NBL Christmas Classic.
- Felt Bicycles: February 10, 2003–Present He was hired as Team manager and racer. In September 2006 he was named Assistant Product Manager for Felt BMX

=== Titles ===
Note: Listed are District, State/Provincial/Department, Regional, National, and International titles in italics. "Defunct" refers to the fact of that sanctioning body in question no longer existing at the start of the racer's career or at that stage of his/her career. Depending on point totals of individual racers, winners of Grand Nationals do not necessarily win National titles. Series and one off Championships are also listed in block.

==== Amateur ====
National Bicycle Association (NBA)

- None

National Bicycle League (NBL)

American Bicycle Association (ABA)

Fédération Internationale Amateur de Cyclisme (FIAC)*

- None

International Bicycle Motocross Federation (IBMXF)*

- None

Union Cycliste Internationale (UCI)*

- None

*See note in professional section

==== Professional ====
National Bicycle Association (NBA)

- None

National Bicycle League (NBL)

American Bicycle Association (ABA)

United States Bicycle Motocross Association (USBA)

- None

International Bicycle Motocross Federation (IBMXF)*

- None

Fédération Internationale Amateur de Cyclisme (FIAC)*

- None (FIAC did not have a strictly professional division during its existence) (defunct).

Union Cycliste Internationale (UCI)*

*Note: Beginning in 1991 the IBMXF and FIAC had been holding joint World Championship events as a transitional phase in merging which began in earnest in 1993. Beginning with the 1996 season the IBMXF and FIAC completed the merger and both ceased to exist as independent entities being integrated into the UCI. Beginning with the 1997 World Championships held in Brighton, England the UCI would officially hold and sanction BMX World Championships and with it inherited all precedents, records, streaks, etc. from both the IBMXF and FIAC.

=== BMX product lines ===
- 1996 Airwalk Foster Bros. Signature shoes.

=== Significant injuries ===
- Broken collarbone at the NBL South Park National in Pittsburgh, Pennsylvania, in 1986. He fractured it again six weeks later after crashing again practicing at the Howard County, Maryland ABA track.
- Ruptured spleen in January 1989 at the Magnolia jumps in Huntington Beach, California. Headtube broke off of a prototype ELF frame.
- He was injured in a crash with Steve Veltman in a 1996 ABA Gold Cup race in York, Pennsylvania. He spent several days in the hospital.
- Broke two ribs in a fall at the NBL Indianapolis Nationals in Indianapolis, Indiana, on the weekend of June 27–28, 1997. At this time he was recovering from dental surgery. He was expected at the time to rocover before the NBL Grandnational.
- Bruised his coccyx at a national in May 1999
- Crushed a vertebra and broke two more as well as broke two ribs and various minor injuries when he landed face first while jumping at Sheep Hills dirt-jumping riding area in Costa Mesa, California, on April 11, 2009. He underwent trauma care and later surgery on the following Monday, April 13.

=== Miscellaneous and trivia ===
- Along with John Purse and Brian Lopes, Alan Foster is credited with bringing back the full face helmet, with a rigid structure to protect the jaw and the lower front half of the head, into BMX in the summer of 1996 after it fell out of fashion in the mid-1980s. While not mandatory in either the ABA or the NBL, most BMX racers, amateur and professional, have adopted it.

== Other significant sibling combinations in BMX ==
- Brent & Brian Patterson
- Ronnie & Richie Anderson
- Mike & Eddy King
- Eric & Robby Rupe

== BMX press magazine interviews and articles ==
- "Speed Secrets: Double Jumps" BMX Plus! June 1991 Vol.14 No.6 pg.20 Joint article about how to speed jump efficiently with fellow racer Brian Lopes.
- "Foster Bros." Go August 1991 Vol.2 Iss.10 pg.52 Two separate interviews of Alan and his brother Brian Foster.
- "The Foster Files" BMX Plus! March 1993 Vol.16 No.3 pg.63 Joint interview with his brother Brian Foster.
- "alan foster" Snap BMX Magazine March/April 1996 Vol.3 Iss.2 No.9 pg.32
- "Alan Foster" Snap BMX Magazine June 2000 Vol.7 Iss.6 No.44 (Centerfold poster back)
- "Get a Job: Alan Foster and the Team Manager Gig" RideBMX September 2001 Vol.10 Iss.9 No.64 pg.56

== BMX magazine covers ==
Note: (defunct) denotes that the magazine was out of business before the career of the racer started.

Bicycle Motocross News:

- None (defunct)

Minicycle/BMX Action & Super BMX:

- None

Bicycle Motocross Action & Go:

BMX Plus!:

- August 1991 Vol.14 No.8 with (uncredited) Tim "Fuzzy" Hall (6) and unidentified rider (8).
- March 1993 Vol.16 No.3 (4) with brother Brian Foster (6). In bottom insert Mike King.
- November 1993 Vol.16 No.11 (16) on the inside with Tim Strelecki (4)
- May 1994 Vol.17 No.5 (4) in third behind Gary Ellis (1) in the lead and brother Brian Foster in second.
- November 1994 Vol.17 No.11 (4) with Kendall Burlson (4, extreme left), Greg Romero (3) to Alan's right and In Hee Lee (GT, No number plate) to his left. In top inset freestyler Matt Hoffman. In bottome inset Racing tire shoot out.

Total BMX:

- None

Bicycles and Dirt:

- None

Ride BMX Magazine:

Snap BMX Magazine & Transworld BMX:

- Snap November/December 1996 Vol.3 Iss.6 No.13 (9) behind Wade Bootes (66).
- Snap May 1999 Vol.6 Iss.3 No.31

BMX World:

ABA Action, American BMXer, BMXer (the official BMX publication of the ABA under three different names):
