= Eddy King =

American bicycle motocross rider

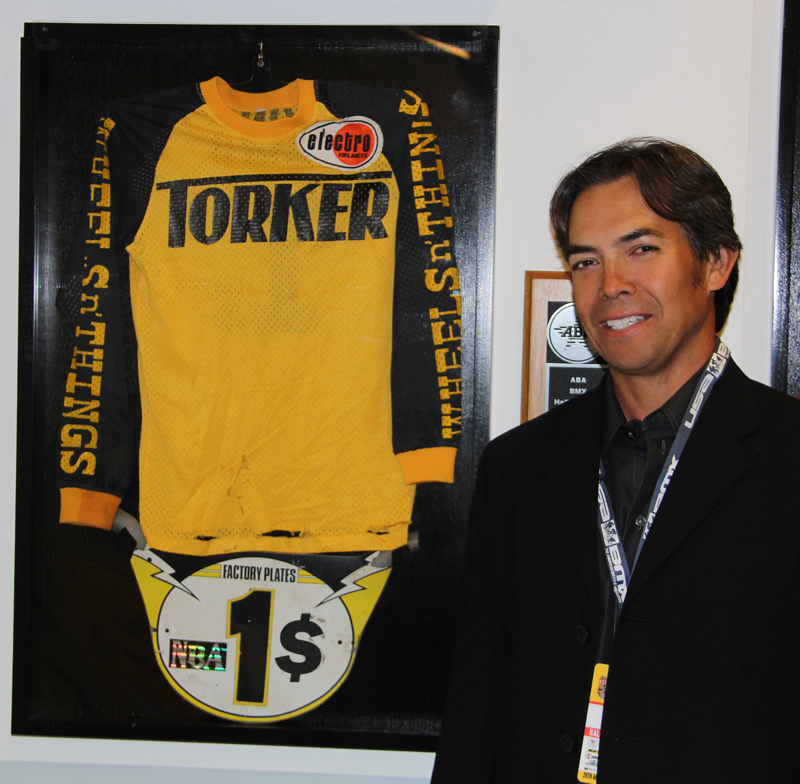
- photo of King by Patty Whisenhunt

Personal information
- Full name: Edward King
- Nicknames: "King Edward", "Eddy the King" "Silver Bullet"
- Born: October 9, 1964 (age 62) Philippines
- Height: 1.65 m (5 ft 5 in)
- Weight: 65.8 kg (145 lb)

Cycling career
- Sport: Cycling
- Current team: Retired
- Discipline: Bicycle Motocross (BMX)
- Role: Racer
- Rider type: Off Road

Amateur teams
- 1975-1976: S & W Bike Shop
- 1976-1977: The Bike Shop of El Cajon
- 1977: D.G. Performance Specialties
- 1977-1978: Wheels N' Things/R & R Racing
- 1978: Wheels N' Things/Torker
- 1978-1980: Torker Engineering
- 1980-1983: Diamond Back

Professional team
- 1983-1989: DiamondBack

Edward King (born October 9, 1964, in the Philippines (in 1970 his family settled in Chula Vista, California)) is an "Old School" former professional Bicycle Motocross (BMX) racer whose prime competitive years were from 1977 to 1985.

Eddy King is the elder of a sibling combinations of Mike & Eddy King in BMX racing. Only the brother combinations of Ronnie & Richie Anderson and Brent & Brian Patterson were more successful. His best known nickname "King Edward" is an obvious play on his name feeding off of the cultural knowledge of famous British kings named Edwards. Other nicknames included "Silver Bullet" "Eddy the King" and "The Dynamic Duo" which he shared with Diamondback teammate Harry Leary. He was particularly dominant as an amateur winning most of his racing titles at that stage of his career. He would go on to be a professional for the remaining six years of his 14-year career. King would stay his entire professional career with Diamondback and would be associated with that company.

== Racing career milestones ==
Note: Professional first are on the National level unless otherwise indicated. Included under the title of "National" are American Bicycle Association (ABA) Gold Cup Qualifiers.

Milestone	Event details
Started racing:	Friday January 15, 1975 age 10. He noticed a flyer for a race tacked on the door of his local bicycle shop near his home in San Diego, California and went to the Silver Wing Park track in San Diego, California to watch a few times. After that he decided to race.
Sanctioning body:	San Diego BMX Association (SDBMXA).
Home sanctioning body district(s):	National Bicycle Association (NBA) District "S" (1975–1981); American Bicycle Association California 2 (CA-2) (1977–1989)
First race bike:	A purchase from K-mart in December 1974. It cost US$29.95
First race result:	First Place 9 & 10 year old class. No proficiency divisions at the time.
First win (local):	See above.
First sponsor:	S & W Bike Shop in 1975. He was offered a sponsorship the second race he entered.
First national win:	
Turned professional:	First week of March 1983.
First professional race result:	Made 20" "B" Pro main but DNF'ed (Did Not Finish) at National Bicycle League (NBL) War of the Stars Nationals in Memphis, Tennessee on March 26, 1983 (he collided with a photographer). He won US$25, the equivalent to US$52.03 in 2007 (Cost of Living Calculator).
First professional win:	"A" Pro main at the American Bicycle Association (ABA) Wheaties Gold Cup Qualifier on April 9, 1983, in Lubbock, Texas on the weekend of ABA the Lone Star National.
First Junior Men/pro* race result:	See "First Professional race result"
First Junior Men/pro win:	See "First Professional win"
First Senior pro** race result:	Crashed in the semi-finals and did not make main in the first of the NBL sanctioned ESPN Pro Spectacular race series on May 8, 1983, in Miami, Florida. He had moved himself up from "B" pro to "A" pro for this race.
First Senior pro win:	In "A" Pro on June 4, 1983, at an NBL national in Peoria, Illinois.
Height and weight at height of his career (1983):	Ht:5'5 Wt:~145 lbs

Retired: In February 1989. He was 24 years old. He retired after his contract with Diamondback expired. He was basically burned out of the sport and felt it was time to do other things:

Sparky: "Most of us from time to time decide to more on from companies of employment, but was there any particular reason for leaving DB, was it simply to progress your career?"
Eddy: "I was tired and my body was tired. I had just purchased a new home and I wanted more time to pursue other interests and move forward in a different direction in life. Racing left little to no time for anything but racing, training, traveling, product development, and photo shoots. That is why I retired."

The 1988 ABA Grandnational in Oklahoma City, Oklahoma for Eddy King represented a changing of the guard. It was the same race in which his younger brother Mike King won the 1988 ABA National No.1 pro title. Eddy himself came in sixth place in Pro Open, winning US$210 (US$367.99 in 2007).
Eddy King's last race as a Senior Pro was the ABA Winternationals on February 19, 1989. He came in eighth place last in "AA" pro. He would race on at least two more occasions post retirement. He raced in the ABA Springnationals in Bakersfield, California on March 20 & 21, 1993 in the new Veteran Pro class with fellow retired pros including Tommy Brackens, Perry Kramer and Rod Beckering. He came in fourth on Saturday and fifth on Sunday. His old teammate Harry Leary won both days. He also raced Veteran Pro at the ABA Fall Nationals in Burbank, California on October 22, 1994, coming in sixth with Brian Patterson winning the event.

*In the NBL "B" Pro/Super Class/"A" Pro/Junior Elite Men (depending on the era); in the ABA "A" Pro.
**In the NBL "A" Pro/All Pro/Elite Men; in the ABA "AA" Pro.

=== Career factory and major bike-shop sponsors ===
Note: This listing only denotes the racer's primary sponsors. At any given time a racer could have numerous co-sponsors. Primary sponsorships can be verified by BMX press coverage and sponsor's advertising at the time in question. When possible exact dates are given.

==== Amateur ====
- S & W Bike Shop: January 1975-Early 1976
- The Bike shop of El Cajon: Early 1976-March 1977
- The Bike shop of El Cajon/D.G. Performance Specialties (The initials stood for Dan Hangsleben, Gary Harlow): March 1977-May 1977 Support team with "The Bike Shop of El Cajon" being his main sponsor.
- Wheels N' Things/R & R (Rick Ankron & Rick Varner) Racing: May 1977-June 1978
- Wheels N' Things/Torker Engineering: June 1978-Fall 1978
- Torker Engineering: Fall 1978-September 1980 Originally King was co-sponsored by Torker. Then in the Fall of 1978 King became full factory Torker at the US Nationals.
- Diamond Back (Centurion): September 1980-February 1989. As with his very first sponsor, S & W Bike Shop, King was recruited by Diamondback. Eddy would turn pro with this sponsor.

==== Professional ====
- Diamond Back: September 1980-February 1989. Diamond Back was the only sponsor of Eddy King's professional career.

=== Career bicycle motocross titles ===
Note: Listed are District, State/Provincial/Department, Regional, National, and International titles in italics. "Defunct" refers to the fact of that sanctioning body in question no longer existing at the start of the racer's career or at that stage of his/her career. Depending on point totals of individual racers, winners of Grand Nationals do not necessarily win National titles. Series and one off Championships are also listed in block.

==== Amateur ====
National Bicycle Association (NBA)

- 1976,'77,'78 San Diego District No.1
- 1976 11 Boys California Cup Champion*
- 1976 10-11 Expert California State Champion
- 1977 12 Expert Champion in RC Cola/Two Wheeler's Race of Champions Invitational

The RC Cola/Two Wheeler's Race of Champions was a seven race NBA series sponsored by RC Cola and Two Wheelers. Racers raced six regional qualifying races in California and Arizona. Only racers who made at least the semi-finals or mains (if the class was too small for a semi final) were invited to race the Championship event held on May 15, 1977 in Gardena, California at Ascot Park.

- 1977 12 Expert District Championships Champion.
- 1978 13 Expert California State Champion
- 1978 14 Expert National No.1
- 1979 15 Expert Grandnational Champion

National Bicycle League (NBL)

- 1981 16 & Over Expert Grandnational Champion
- 1982 17 Expert Grandnational Champion
- 1982 17 Expert National No.3

Bicycle Motocross Association of San Diego (BMXA)

- 1976 No.3

International Bicycle Motocross (iBMX)

- 1976 11 boys Grandnational Champion

United Bicycle Racers (UBR)

American Bicycle Association (ABA)

- 1982 17 Expert Northeastern Gold Cup Champion

United States Bicycle Motocross Association (USBA)

- None

International Bicycle Motocross Federation (IBMXF)

- None

Independent race series and invitationals:

*The California Cup was a non sanctioned series of three qualifying races held at three tracks (for a total of nine separate races) in three different regions of Northern California. Then the finals were held. The series was sponsored and promoted by BX-Weekly Magazine, a BMX newspaper and Rick Ankron & Rick Varner (R&R) Racing Products. The finals were held at the famous Corona Raceway on September 5, 1976. Side note: Brian Patterson came in second in 11 Boys behind Eddy King.

==== Professional ====
National Bicycle Association (NBA)

- None

National Bicycle League (NBL)

- None

United Bicycle Racers (UBR)

American Bicycle Association (ABA)

- None

United States Bicycle Motocross Association (USBA)

- None

International Bicycle Motocross Federation (IBMXF)

- 1987 Second Place Silver Medal World Champion.

Pro Series Championships

=== Notable accolades ===
- Named one of the "Terrible Ten", BMX Action's pick of fastest amateur racers in the world in 1983
- Named Pro Rookie of the Year for 1983 by BMX Action magazine.
- Eddy King is a 1989 Inductee to the ABA BMX Hall of Fame.

=== BMX Product Lines ===
- 1979 Torker "Eddy King" complete bicycle.

Product evaluations:

=== Significant injuries ===
- Received a broken right foot at the 1987 ABA Gilley's Nationals in Pasadena, Texas on March 7, when someone ran over it after going down in a collision.
- Suffered a hand injury at the First Annual Palm Springs Aerial Tramway Gravity Powered Vehicle (GPV) and Ramp Jam in Palm Springs, California in June 1987. He was laid up until the ABA National in Ogden, Utah.

=== Miscellaneous ===
In an interview in the August 1987 issue of BMX Action Eddy King admitted that himself and allegedly Harry Leary along with four other people considered using anabolic steroids to race since BMX tracks at that time was focused on the power racer more than the racer that relied more on finesse and jumping ability. He also stated that he knew of a couple of racers that actually used them:

"Right now, pro racing is all power. I know of a couple of pros who are taking steroids and about half a dozen have looked at it, including myself and Harry. The doctors told us, 'No way. Don't do it.' Maybe the association will have to crack down on it like in other sports. Or change the tracks." ---BMX Action August 1987

Ironically, the tracks did change from an emphasis in power to those of skill and finesse in the mid-1990s. During this time comparatively small framed pro racers like Alan and Brian Foster and in the early 21st century Mario Soto and Donny Robinson racers that relied on finesse to make up for a lack of power started to do well. This coupled with drug testing instituted by the ABA in the late 1990s and later by the NBL, USA Cycling and the UCI, allegations of steroid use against BMX racers-either out of jealousy or real knowledge-fell.

== Post BMX career ==
After retiring after the 1988 season, Eddy King became a full-time real estate broker (fellow BMX racer Cheri Elliott would become one as well approximately 14 years later after her mountain bike (MTB) racing career). Indeed, his career in that field started before retirement selling his first house, his own in the summer of 1987 for US$180,000, which was the equivalent to US$328,468.31 in 2007(Cost of Living Calculator).

== Other significant sibling combinations in BMX ==
- Ronnie & Richie Anderson
- Brent & Brian Patterson
- Eric & Robby Rupe
- Alan & Brian Foster
- Rich & Gary Houseman

== BMX press magazine interviews and articles ==
- "Agility and ability make Eddy a BMX winner" the California BMX Rider Summer 1976 Vol.1 No.2
- "Ask the Experts...: 'What type of tires do you use?'" BMX Plus! January 1979 Vol.2 No.1 pg.51 Brief article on what brand and size of tires he uses racing.
- "Confrontation at Corona" Bicycle Motocross Action March/April 1979 Vol.4 No.2 pg.53 Joint interview of King, Lee Medlin, and Chris Hopkins at the ABA Fall Nationals at Corona Speed way in Corona, California on September 17, 1978, interspred in the race report.
- "Torker Team" BMX Plus! May 1980 Vol.3 No.5 pg.20 Joint interview with his brother Mike King, Clint Miller, Mike Agueilera, and Jason Jensen; his teammates on the Torker BMX racing team.
- "The Master of Style Pictorial: Eddy King" Bicycle Motocross Action June 1980 Vol.5 No.6 pg.26 Pictorial profile of King.
- "The King Is Back" Bicycle Motocross Action December 1981 Vol.6 No.12 pg.72 sidebar.
- "Eddy King: Super Athlete, Super Individual!" BMXA of San Diego Newsletter April 1982 Vol.1 No.2
- "Eddy King" BMX Plus! May 1982 Vol.5 No.5 pg.43
- "Harry & Eddy" BMX Action February 1984 Vol.9 No.2 pg.46 Joint interview with Harry Leary.
- "Five Minutes with Eddy King" BMX Action October 1984 Vol.9 No.10 pg.18 side bar
- "On the Cover...Eddy King" BMX Action August 1987 Vol.12 No.8 pg.72
- "Bros. Eddy & Mike" BMX Action January 1988 Vol.13 No.1 pg.30 Joint interview with his brother Mike King.

== BMX magazine covers ==
Note: Only magazines that were in publication at the time of the racer's career(s) are listed unless specifically noted.

Bicycle Motocross News:

- None

Minicycle/BMX Action & Super BMX:

- December 1983 Vol.10 No.12

Bicycle Motocross Action & Go:

- June 1980 Vol.5 No.6 (BMXA)
- March 1983 Vol.8 No.3 (BMXA)
- August 1987 Vol.12 No.8 with Billy Griggs and Charles Townsend. (BMXA)

BMX Plus!:

- July 1979 Vol.2 No.7 ahead of Donny Atherton.
- January 1985 Vol.8 No.1 in circle insert behind Billy Griggs testing bikes. Main image: freestyler Marc McGlynn.
- April 1985 Vol.8 No.4 (5) in insert with Harry Leary (2). Main image is Eric Rupe.
- June 1985 Vol.8 No.6 being jumped over by Harry Leary.
- July 1985 Vol.8 No.7 in insert with Mike Miranda (17). Main image freestyler Ron Wilkerson.
- March 1986 Vol.9 No.3 in top insert (7) ahead of Frank Post (18) behind Ronnie Anderson (3) Pete Loncarevich (1) Don Johle (10) and Brian Patterson (6) in bottom right insert skateboarder Lester Kasai and in bottom left insert freestyler Mike Dominguez. In main image both Dominguez and Kasai.
- February 1987 Vol.10 No.2. (6) in insert behind Mike Miranda (5) and beside Pete Loncarevich (2). In separate insert top freestyler Martin Aparijo frame standing on MX motorcycle. Main Image: Freestyler Rich Sigur
- March 1987 Vol.14 No.3 in bottom insert (6) behind Greg Hill (16) several places back. In right insert on ramp freestyler Joe Johnson. Main image freestyler Dennis McCoy.

Total BMX:

- May 1981

Bicycles and Dirt:

- October 1982 Vol.1 No.2 (9) in second behind Tim Judge (55) and ahead of unknown (175).

NBA World & NBmxA World (The official NBA/NBmxA membership publication):

BMXA Newsletter (The official BMXA of San Diego membership publication):

- April 1982 Vol.1 No.2 with two unidentified racers.

Bicycles Today & BMX Today (The official NBL membership publication under two names):

ABA Action, American BMXer, BMXer (The official ABA membership publication under three names):

- April 1984 Vol.7 No.3 Top middle with (clockwise) Brent Romero, Todd Guss, Brian Patterson, Doug Davis, Brett Allen and Cheri Elliott.
- June 1984 Vol.7 No.5 behind Brian Patterson.

USBA Racer (The official USBA membership publication):
