= Lee Medlin =

American bicycle motocross rider (born 1964)

Personal information
- Full name: Frankie Lee Medlin
- Nickname: "Peddlin'"
- Born: December 9, 1964 (age 61) Riverside, California, U.S.
- Height: 1.68 m (5 ft 6 in)
- Weight: 63.5 kg (140 lb)

Cycling career
- Sport: Cycling
- Current team: Retired
- Discipline: Bicycle Motocross (BMX)
- Role: Racer
- Rider type: Off Road

Amateur teams
- 1977: Anaheim Bicycle Center
- 1978: Robinson Racing
- 1978-1980: GT Racing
- 1980-1982: Kuwahara Cycles
- 1982: RRS
- 1982-1983: Raleigh Cycle Company

Professional teams
- 1983: Kuwahara Cycles
- 1984: Maximum

Frankie Lee Medlin (born December 9, 1964) was an American professional "Old School" Bicycle Motocross (BMX) racer whose prime competitive years were from (1977–1982) His nickname was "Peddlin'", an obvious play on his surname and the motive power of a bicycle.

== Racing career milestones ==
Note: Professional first are on the national level unless otherwise indicated.

Started Racing: January 12, 1977, at Corona Raceway at 13 years old.

Sanctioning Body: Riverside School District

First race result: He didn't make the main.

First Race Bike: Webco. It was a Christmas 1976 present

First win (local): February 12, 1977. He won his 4th race.

First sponsor: 1977 Anaheim Bicycle Center

First national win:

Turned Professional: January 23, 1983, at 18 years of age.

First Professional race result: Second in "A" pro at the American Bicycle Association (ABA) Supernationals in Lake Elsinore, California on January 23, 1983 He won US$300. (the equivalent to US$619.58 in 2007 Cost of Living Calculator)

First Professional win: In "A" Pro at the ABA Cajun Nationals in Shreveport, Louisiana, on January 30, 1983. He won US$280, the equivalent of US$578.27 in 2007.

First Junior Men Pro* race result: See "First Professional race result"

First Junior Men Pro win: See "First Professional win"

First Senior Men Pro** race result: Seventh place in "AA" pro at the ABA Grandnational in Tulsa, Oklahoma, on November 27, 1983. He won US$260 or US$541.14 in 2007.

First Senior Men Pro win:

Retired: 1984 due to injuries to his knee. See "Significant Injuries" section below.

Height & weight at height of his career (1982): Ht:5'7" Wt:140 lbs. (1982)

*In the NBL "B" Pro/Super Class/"A" Pro/Junior Men depending on the era. Junior Men is a Pro/Am class; in the ABA it is "A" Pro.
**In the NBL it is "A" Pro/All Pro/"AA" pro/Elite Men depending on the era. Elite Men is a Pro/Am class; in the ABA it is "AA" Pro.

=== Career factory and major bike shop sponsors ===
Note: This listing only denotes the racer's primary sponsors. At any given time a racer could have numerous ever changing co-sponsors. Primary sponsorships can be verified by BMX press coverage and sponsor's advertisements at the time in question. When possible exact dates are used.

==== Amateur ====
- Anaheim Bicycle Center: 1977-
- Robinson Racing Products: -Mid 1978
- GT (Gary Turner) Racing: Mid 1978-Late August 1980
- Kuwahara Cycles, Ltd.: Late August 1980-July 15, 1982, Medlin's first race for Kuwahara was the NBL Grand Nationals on August 30, 1980 Medlin quit Kuwahara due to difference between himself and team management. In solidarity, professional Kevin McNeal, who was his close friend and had very recently rejoined Kuwahara, quit with Medlin. "Kuwahara" is Japanese for Mulberry Meadows. The company is named after Sentaro Kuwahara who founded the company in 1916 in Osaka, Japan.
- RRS (Riverside-Redlands Schwinn): August 21, 1982 – August 22, 1982, Medlin was only sponsored by RRS for the weekend of the NBL Ascot National in Gardena, California, before being picked up by Raleigh right after the National.
- Raleigh Cycle Company of America: August 23, 1982 – January 22, 1983.

==== Professional ====
- Kuwahara Cycles, Ltd.: January 22, 1983-Early December 1983. Medlin rejoined Kuwahara on the same day he turned pro.
- Maximum Early April 1984-

=== Career bicycle motocross titles ===
Note: Listed are District, State/Provincial/Department, Regional, National, and International titles in italics. "Defunct" refers to the fact of that sanctioning body in question no longer existing at the start of the racer's career or at that stage of his/her career. Depending on point totals of individual racers, winners of Grand Nationals do not necessarily win National titles. Series and one off Championships are also listed in block.

==== Amateur ====
National Bicycle Association (NBA)

- 1978 13 Expert Western States Champion
- 1978 National No.3
- 1979 14 Expert Grandnational Champion
- 1980 15 Expert Grandnational Champion

National Bicycle League (NBL)

- 1980 15 Expert Grandnational Champion

United Bicycle Racers (UBR)

- 1980 15 Expert and 14 & Open Spring Championships Champion

American Bicycle Association (ABA)

- 1979 National No.3

Fédération Internationale Amateur de Cyclisme (FIAC)*

- None

International Bicycle Motocross Federation (IBMXF)*

- None

Union Cycliste Internationale (UCI)*

- None

United States Cycling Federation (USCF)

- 1981 JAG 16 Expert, 14 & Over Trophy Dash & Over all World Champion

*See note in professional section

==== Professional ====
National Bicycle Association (NBA)

- None

National Bicycle League (NBL)

- None

United Bicycle Racers (UBR)

- None

American Bicycle Association (ABA)

- None

United States Bicycle Motocross Association (USBA)

- None

International Bicycle Motocross Federation (IBMXF):

- None

Fédération Internationale Amateur de Cyclisme (FIAC)*

- None (FIAC did not have a strictly professional division during its existence)

Union Cycliste Internationale (UCI)*

- None

*Note: Beginning in 1991 the IBMXF and FIAC had been holding joint World Championship events as a transitional phase in merging which began in earnest in 1993. Beginning with the 1996 season the IBMXF and FIAC completed the merger and both ceased to exist as independent entities being integrated into the UCI. Beginning with the 1997 World Championships held in Brighton, England the UCI would officially hold and sanction BMX World Championships and with it inherited all precedents, records, streaks, etc. from both the IBMXF and FIAC.

Pro Series Championships

=== Significant injuries ===
- He possibly received a knee injury at the NBL War of the Stars national in Reno, Nevada, on June 18, 1983. In a bmxactiononline.com interview he mentions "....in the main I blew out my knee and sat out the entire summer." He crashed on the first jump on the first straight in the "B" pro main in that Nevada race. His name does disappear from the results after the Nevada race. It reappears at the ABA Summer Nationals in Elkhart, Indiana, on August 14, 1983, two months after the June 1983 incident and can possibly be interpreted as him sitting out "...the entire summer". In Bicycles and Dirt magazine's coverage of the 1983 ABA Summer Nationals it mentioned that:
  "Lee is still gaining strength after an injury, so the question was whether he had the strength to last down the long Elkhart straights."
  This further indicates that he had an injury over the summer that affected his racing.
- He reinjured his knee in a semi final at the ABA Grandnational in Tulsa, Oklahoma, on November 27, 1983, that he originally hurt apparently at the NBL 1983 Reno, Nevada national the previous June. He mentions in a Gary Haselhorst interview for bmxactiononline that it was the primary factor in his retirement from BMX:
  "Then in a semi tore up my knee again. At that point I decided it wasn't worth it anymore. I raced a couple races in 1984 and actually won the pro open as a part timer in Salt Lake, but I didn't stick around long before I moved on."
  He was still able to make the main and come in seventh over all in that his first AA pro race.

== BMX press magazine interviews and articles ==
- "Confrontation at Corona" Bicycle Motocross Action March/April 1979 Vol.4 No.2 pg.53 Joint interview of Medlin Eddy King and Chris Hopkins at the ABA Fall Nationals at Corona Speed way in Corona, California, on September 17, 1978, interspred in the race report.
- "Lee Medlin! World Champion" BMX Plus! April 1982 Vol.5 No.4 pg.20
- "Lee Medlin" BMX Action February 1983 Vol.8 No.2 pg.46 Statistical profile of the racer.

== BMX magazine covers ==
Note: Only magazines that were in publication at the time of the racer's career(s) are listed unless specifically noted.

Bicycle Motocross News:

Minicycle/BMX Action & Super BMX:

Bicycle Motocross Action & Go:

BMX Plus!:

Total BMX:

Bicycles and Dirt:

NBA World & NBmxA World (The official NBA/NBmx publication):

Bicycles Today & BMX Today (the official NBL publication under two names):

ABA Action, American BMXer, BMXer (the official ABA publication under three names):
