= Richie Anderson (BMX rider) =

American bicycle motocross rider (born 1967)

Personal information
- Full name: Richard Anderson
- Nickname: "The Avalanche"
- Born: March 14, 1967 (age 59) Vallejo, California, United States
- Height: 1.89 m (6 ft 2 in)
- Weight: 80 kg (180 lb)

Cycling career
- Sport: Cycling
- Current team: Retired
- Discipline: Bicycle Motocross (BMX)
- Role: Racer
- Rider type: Off Road

Amateur teams
- 1978–1984: Patterson Racing Products
- 1984: Zeronine
- 1984: Torker BMX Racing Products
- 1984: Skyway Recreations

Professional teams
- 1985: Skyway Recreations
- 1986: MRC
- 1986: Power Racing Products
- 1986: Spinners
- 1987: Hardee's
- 1987–1988: White Bear
- 1989–1992: Retired from racing
- 1993-1994: U.S. Boss Racing Products
- 1994-?: Power Source Roost America
- 1996: Answer
- 1998: Factory

Richard Anderson (born March 14, 1967) is a former American "Old School" professional bicycle motocross (BMX) racer whose prime competitive years were 1978–1986.

Anderson is the younger of what was one of the most potent sibling combinations that bicycle motocross has ever seen. Only the Pattersons, Brian and Brent, whom Richie raced with on the same factory team for seven years, had more titles between them and were more dominant in BMX. His older brother Ronnie Anderson, whose amateur career Richie overshadowed, would become National number one pro with the American Bicycle Association (ABA) and the United Bicycle Racers (UBR) an achievement Richie never achieved after he turned professional.

He is nicknamed "Richie Rich," an allusion to the comic book character Richie Rich and by simple alliteration. He was most commonly called "The Avalanche". He received the moniker due to being so dominant during the 1980 season (on his way to winning his second consecutive amateur ABA No.1 title) that it was thought no one and nothing could stop him. He was also nicked-named "Mr. Smooth" for his effortless racing and huge natural ability, particularly in speed jumping over single "whoop-de-doos" which are similar to a mogul in skiing (effectively a very large speed bump) while still pedaling (many racers would get the "Mr. Smooth" moniker for their seemingly effortless riding skill particularly over speed jumps, including Eric Carter). Even most top pros stop pedaling over speed jumps to keep the chances of crashing to a minimum. However, doing so would be just coasting while a few racers like Richie Anderson kept applying the power, a great advantage. Indeed, his speed jumping skills were featured in a November 1980 article of Bicycle Motocross Action called "Method Speed Jumping" showcasing his abilities.

== Racing career milestones ==
Note: Professional first are on the national level unless otherwise indicated.

Milestone	Event details
Started racing:	1976 at nine years old at Concord track in Concord, California.
Sanctioning body:	
Home sanctioning body district(s):	National Bicycle Association (NBA) Region N (Northern California)
First race bike:	
First race result:	9 Novice, second place. He was actually leading going into a turn but was "swooped", i.e. passed on the inside of him by another racer. He vowed to perfect that move for himself, which he did and became known for.
First win (local):	In his second race.
First sponsor:	Patterson Racing Products 1977. His first sponsor was full factory and not the local bike shop as it usually is with racers that show talent.
First national win:	
Turned professional:	January 1, 1985, at age 17.
First professional race result:	Fourth in "A" pro and Fifth in Pro Cruiser in the 1985 American Bicycle Association (ABA) Reno Pro Spectacular on January 4, 1985, in Reno, Nevada. He won US$90 in "A" pro and US$90 in Pro Cruiser; the equivalent to US$172 in 2007 each (Cost of living Calculator)
First professional win:	At the ABA Silver Dollar Nationals in Pro Cruiser on January 6, 1985, in Reno, Nevada. He won US$150 or US$286.76 in 2007 dollars.
First Junior Pro* race result:	See "First professional race result"
First Junior Pro win:	In "A" Pro at the ABA Dixieland Nations in Raleigh, North Carolina, on February 10, 1985.
First Senior Pro** race result:	Sixth in "AA" Pro at the ABA U.S. Nationals in Bakersfield, California, on March 31, 1985. He won US$100, US$191.17 in 2007 dollars.
First Senior Pro win:	In "AA" pro at the ABA Lone Star Nationals in Austin, Texas, on April 14, 1985. He won US$400, the equivalent to US$764.68 in 2007.
Height and weight at height of his career:	Ht: 6'2.5" Wt:~175-180 lbs. From between early 1981, just before he turned 14 years old, to Mid 1982 when he was 15 he grew from 5'2" to 6'1".
Retired:	1988 at age 21. The 1988 ABA Grand national seems to have been his last race in "AA" pro or any other pro class since his name disappears from the results tables the following season. He did not make the main in the Grand Nationals. It is possible that a hip injury prompted his retirement.

*In the NBL Junior Pro is "B" Pro/Superclass/"A" Pro depending on the era; in the ABA it is "A" Pro.
**In the NBL Senior Pro is "A" or Elite Pro; in the ABA it is "AA" Pro.

== Career factory and major bicycle shop sponsors ==
Note: This listing only denotes the racer's primary sponsors. At any given time a racer could have numerous co-sponsors. Primary sponsorships can be verified by BMX press coverage and sponsor's advertisements at the time in question. When possible exact dates are given.

=== Amateur ===
- Patterson Racing Products: Early 1978-Mid May 1984. After seven years at Patterson Richie Anderson left in preparation to turn pro and as he put it for a "better deal" (it was an open secret that a few top amateurs were being paid by their main sponsor and/or cosponsors). It was the longest sponsorship by far over his career. After leaving Patterson and turning pro this would be turned on its head, with frequent changes of sponsorship due to contractual conflicts and a desire to bring his brother Ronnie on to the team he was currently on despite Ronnie's poor reputation in good sportsmanship and mercurial nature. On at least two occasions while racing as a privateer (a non sponsored self-financing racer) between sponsorships he would show up in the uniform of Patterson Racing Products, his sponsor while as an amateur. This is despite that not only he was not being sponsored by them, the company had been out of business approximately for a year and a half at the time of the second incident at the ABA Gold Cup Championship West at Chandler, Arizona in 1988. The first time this happened was at the October 1987 Lemoore, California NBL national. He did it at least for a third time when he raced in the 1988 ABA Grand National in a Patterson helmet and jersey (he wore grey sweatpants. Why specifically it is unknown, but it is believed that the Patterson family was more than a business arrangement that began when he was nine. Indeed, he even says so specifically. This from a December 11, 2005, Vintagebmx.com post of his:

"This is in reply to Andy's Diamond's post. Just to put the "Richie tid bits" straight. Vance sat down with my father. I was on the Patterson team for 6 years. Because of my accomplishments in racing and with Patterson Racing products, they were going to offer me a truck. The truck was NEVER given to me.* Unfortunately, later that season I left and moved on. I still have a great relationship with the Patterson's. They will always be family to me. Hopefully that clears things up. The Patterson's are now running a successful company, AAA Fire Control Systems, in Hayward, CA. Vance is retired and traveling the country with his wife. Brent and Brian both run the company."

*The truck in question was allegedly intended for use for his transportation to and from races when flying was unnecessary. In a mini three question interview printed in BMX Plus! Vance Patterson, the father of Brent and Brian Patterson and owner of Patterson Racing Products, seems to have agreed to give him the truck:

BMX Plus!: "I want to ask you about the truck you are giving Richie. What is the deal there? Why are you giving Richie a truck after he's left the team?

Vance Patterson: "The agreement was that Richie was going to stay as an amateur for the balance of the year. I will give him a truck, not based upon this year, but for what he's done in the past."

---BMX Plus! October 1984

In a previous interview in the May 1984 issue of BMX Action magazine Richie Anderson denied that the truck was a quid pro quo to stay amateur and agreed that it was a token of the Patterson's appreciation of his years of service:

BMXA: "Is it true that the Pattersons bought it for you to keep you amateur?"

Richie Anderson: "No, it's for all the years I've been racing for them."

---BMX Action May 1984

- Zeronine: May 1984 – July 6, 1984. Anderson was co-sponsored by Zeronine at this time as it was during some of his days at Patterson. He raced with a Zeronine uniform on as a Zeronine official Kevin Shepman, who was also a personal friend of Anderson, acted as his agent handling negotiations for potential teams for Anderson to join.
- Torker BMX Racing Products: July 7, 1984 – November 1984
- Skyway Recreations: November 1984-Late November 1985 He turned pro with this sponsor.

=== Professional ===
- Skyway Recreations: November 1984-Late November 1985 Richie Anderson would end his association with Skyway Recreations when they balked at signing his controversial older brother and top pro Ronnie Anderson after he left Zeronine. Richie and Ronnie wanted permission to bill themselves and have printed out on their uniforms the "A-Team" a dual reference to the first letter of their common last name and to an action-adventure television show called "The A-Team" which was very popular at the time. Complicating things further, Richie Anderson showed up on an old Torker bicycle (which returned to business under new owners as Torker 2) and on aluminum alloy wheels (as opposed to Skyway's trade mark Nylon five spoked mag wheels) and dressed in just a plain sweat shirt at the NBL Christmas National on December 29, 1985, two days before his contract with Skyway would expire, therefore breaching his contract with Skyway Recreations. However, Skyway was willing to overlook that issue to resign the potent Richie Anderson, just not his problematic brother. Richie Anderson was not the only Skyway team members that was not re-signed with Skyway; the entire 1985 team, including Cheri Elliott did not have a contract for 1986. According to Richie Anderson at the Christmas National, as far as they were concerned he was unsponsored: "It seems they're more interested in their freestyle team. Ronnie and I are looking for a team that will take both of us. We want to stick together" Perhaps it was Richie's experience and observance of the Patterson brothers effectiveness when he was on the Patterson Racing team as an amateur that drove Richie's desire to be on the same team as his brother. Or perhaps he wanted to keep his erratic elder brother close and with him. In any case, Skyway did not pick up Ronnie Anderson and Richie did not sign with them. Also, Richie proved to be very right. Skyway would soon drop its racing team, including Cheri Elliott, which in part would provoke her retirement. Richie would eventually get his wish to be on the same factory team with his brother when they served together on MRC if only briefly after Ronnie Anderson left Zeronine (it was rumored, never substantiated, that he demanded that Zeronine buy him a bike shop. They turned him down.) They found each other on Power Racing products, which was owned by Rob Lynch who also owned the famed Peddle Power bicycle shop. Once again it was only briefly. Ron Anderson was let go from the Power Racing Products team on his very first weekend of racing for them after an altercation with Tommy Brackens at the ABA Freedom Nationals in late 1986. The brothers would be reunited again when they were both on the White Bear factory team. Once again it was only briefly when Ronnie left White Bear to ride for Hutch during March 1988.
- MRC (Mike Redman Concepts): January 25–26, 1986. Richie and Ronnie were simultaneously but very briefly sponsored by this company. It was just for the weekend of the 1986 ABA Supernationals in Los Angeles, California. After this momentary sponsorship Richie was sponsorless for approximately three months.
- PRP (Power Racing Products): Mid April 1986 – October 1986. Ronnie and Richie were again briefly sponsored concurrently over the weekend of August 16–17. Ronnie was fired for the ABA Freedom Nationals altercation with Tommy Brackens that same weekend.
- Spinners (Bike shop): November 29, 1986 – December 1986
- Hardee's (Restaurant): May 1987-Late July 1987. Beginning around 1985–1986, companies with no ties to BMX started sponsoring individual BMX racers and team (prior they would sponsor and co-sponsor BMX national). Hardee's and its competitor McDonald's, both fast food restaurants, were a couple of notables. By the 1990s the NBL would drop the term "Factory Team" from its Factory Team Trophy awards since many main sponsors were not bicycle or bicycle component manufacturers and/or distributors. Anderson would leave the Hardee's team in late July 1987. He would remain sponsorless for approximately three and a half months racing only once in that period, the NBL National in Lemoore, California, on October 10, 1987. He surprisingly wore his old Patterson Racing Products uniform despite the firm being out of business for over a year at that time.
- White Bear: November 1987 – June 1988 Once again briefly Ronnie and Richie were on the same factory team. White Bear, which had a very public anti-drug position at the time dropped Ronnie in mid March 1988 for unspecified reasons save for he "didn't live up to their image". Richie quit from White Bear and moved out of the area. While both brothers were in between sponsors both Richie and Ronnie showed up at the ABA Lone Star Nationals wearing non matching Hutch jerseys (Ronnie had on an early 1980s design). Ronnie had been fired from Hutch recently. Richie never previously road for them at all. It was speculated that either it was some publicity stunt or Ronnie was angling for a second chance. Neither were picked up. After a few months of racing without a sponsor, he quietly retired from racing. Still unsponsored and in what seemed to be his last race in serious Senior Pro racing, he wore his Patterson Racing Products at the ABA Gold Cup Championships West in Chandler, Arizona, in October 1988. It seemed to be a good-bye to racing.
- U.S. Boss Racing Products: January 1993 – September 1994. After retiring for approximately four years he resumes racing in Pro cruiser and the ABA's Veteran Pro classes. Also on Boss racing at this time is Brian Patterson and John Crews, two of his old Patterson Racing Products teammates.
- Power Source Roost America: September 1994-
- Answer Racing: 1996
- Factory: 1998

== Career Bicycle Motocross titles ==
Note: Listed are District, State/Provincial/Department, Regional, National, and International titles in italics. Depending on point totals of individual racers, winners of Grand Nationals do not necessarily win National titles. Only sanctioning bodies active during the racer's career are listed.

=== Amateur ===
National Bicycle Association (NBA)

- 1978 10 Expert and 10 & Under Open Western States Champion (Doubled)
- 1978 11 Expert Grandnational Champion
- 1978 11 Expert National No.1
- 1979 12 Expert Grandnational Champion
- 1980 13 Expert Grandnational Champion

National Bicycle League (NBL)

- 1980 13 Expert and 11–13 Open Grandnational Champion
- 1982 14 Expert Grandnational Champion*
- 1982 14 Expert National No.1*
- 1983 16 Expert and 16 & Over Open Grandnational Champion (Double)
- 1983 16 Expert National No.1
- 1984 17 Expert and 17 Cruiser Grandnational Champion
- 1984 17 Cruiser National No.1

United Bicycle Racers (UBR)

- 1981 14 Expert Grandnational Champion

American Bicycle Association (ABA)

- 1978 11 Expert Grandnational Champion
- 1979 12 Expert and 11–12 Trophy Dash Grandnational Champion (Doubled)
- 1980 13 Expert and 13–14 Open Grandnational Champion (Doubled)
- 1979 & 1980 National No.1
- 1982 15 Expert Grandnational Champion
- 1982 Jag Overall World Champion (ABA sanctioned)
- 1983 16 Expert Canadian-American Champion (ABA and Canadian American Bicycle Association (CBA) sanctioned)
- 1983 16 Expert and 15–16 Cruiser Grandnational Champion (Doubled)
- 1984 17–21 Cruiser U.S. Gold Cup Champion

International Bicycle Motocross Federation (IBMXF)

- 1982 14 Expert Murray World Cup I Champion*
- 1982 14 Expert World Champion*
- 1983 16 Expert Murray World Cup II Champion
- 1984 17 Cruiser Murray World Cup III Champion

Other Titles

- 1982 Mongoose Grand National Champion 15 Expert (Non-sanctioned)**
- 1983 Jag Overall World Super Bowl Champion (Non-sanctioned)

*Under both NBL and IBMXF rules at the time you stayed in the same age division as according to how old you were on January 1 even though you would have an intervening birthday. Therefore Richie Anderson was still a 14 Expert in July 1982 despite turning 15 the previous March. A racer could turn 13 on say January 1 and have to race 13-year-old classes. However a racer who turned 14 on January 2 will still under the rule race in the 13-year-old class, having a day less than a full year of extra physical development over his so-called peers. Due to this both the NBL and IBMXF changed this rule during the off season between 1982 and 1983 and on the day of your birthday and after you have to move up an age division, which was ABA practice.
**The Mongoose Grand National Championships BMX Super Bowl of Motocross International Championship Finals II, despite its all encompassing name was a one off non-sanctioned event put on by Jerry Surber, a private promoter. ABA officials helped to organize and run the event but it was not officially sanctioned by the ABA or the NBL. However, it operated using NBL rules. The 1982 addition was held on March 14, 1982 (which happened to be Richie Anderson's 15th birthday). The concept was similar to Renny Roker's JAG World Championships held at the end of December. However unlike with the JAG World Championships the title of "Champion" Richie won at this race was unofficial.

=== Professional ===
National Bicycle Association (NBA)

- None

National Bicycle League (NBL)

- None

American Bicycle Association (ABA)

- None

United Bicycle Racers (UBR)

- None

International Bicycle Motocross Federation (IBMXF)

- None

=== Notable accolades ===
- Named BMX Plus!'s 1980 Amateur of the Year
- Named one of the "Terrible Ten", BMX Action's pick of fastest amateur racers in the world in 1983
- Named the tenth of the 25 Hottest amateurs in BMX racing by a 1984 survey conducted by BMX Plus! for the opinions of four prominent figures in BMX: Two racers, Brent Patterson and Mike Poulson; and two team officials: Dr. Gary Scofield of GT, Howard Wharthon of Diamond Back.
- He was named 1985 BMX Action's Pro Rookie of the Year.
- He is a 1994 ABA BMX Hall of Fame Inductee.

=== BMX product lines ===
- 1978 Patterson Racing Products "Richie Anderson Frame"

Product Evaluation:

=== Significant injuries ===
- Damaged his hip at the ABA Supernationals on January 18, 1987, in San Bernardino, California. This injury would eventually put an end to his career.

== Other significant sibling combinations in BMX ==
- Brent & Brian Patterson
- Mike & Eddy King
- Eric & Robby Rupe
- Richard & Gary Houseman
- Jeff and Brian Briggs
- Alan & Brian Foster

== Post racing career ==
Richie Anderson is married and has a daughter he hopes will follow in his footsteps.

== BMX magazine and general media interviews and articles ==
- "Method Speed Jumping"Bicycle Motocross Action November 1980 Vol.5 No.11, p. 116 Article about Richie Anderson's speed jumping technique.
- "Amateur Training Techniques" BMX Plus! November 1982 Vol.9 No.11, p. 23 A fitness article featuring Richie Anderson & the Patterson Racing Products team and Jon Anderson (no relation).
- "Mister Smooth: Richie Anderson Interview" Bicycles and Dirt January 1984 Vol.2 No.4, p. 49
- "Sharpshootin'" sidebar BMX Action May 1984 Vol.9 No.5, p. 26
- "Richie Anderson" BMX Plus! October 1984 Vol.7 No.10, p. 32
- "The New Torker" Super BMX November 1984 Vol.11 No.11, p. 23. Short article with his Torker teammates about the new Torker team.
- "Richie Anderson" BMX Plus! May 1985 Vol.8 No.5, p. 30
- "Becoming a Pro" Super BMX & Freestyle August 1985 Vol.12 No.8, p. 55 Written by Richie Anderson himself on how he became a pro racer.
- "Richie & Ronnie Anderson" BMX Action August 1985 Vol.10 No.8, p. 17 Joint interview with the brothers.
- "Flashback: Ronnie & Richie Anderson" Snap BMX Magazine July 2000 Vol.7 Iss.7 No.45, p. 108 Retrospective article about the brothers Anderson.

== BMX magazine covers ==
Bicycle Motocross News:

- None

Minicycle/BMX Action & Super BMX:

- January 1984 Vol.11 No.1. Also in centerfold with actress Lauri Hendler of the NBC television situation comedy show Gimme a Break!. (SBMX)
- April 1985 Vol.12 No.4 (SBMX&F)

Bicycle Motocross Action & Go:

- None

BMX Plus!:

- April 1984 Vol.7 No.4 In top inset. In separate insets D.D. Leone, Pete Loncarevich and freestyler Mike Dominguez.

Total BMX:

Bicycles and Dirt:

- May–June 1983 Vol.1 No.9 with Brian Patterson jumping over his and Brent Patterson hands.

Snap BMX Magazine & Transworld BMX:

- None

NBA World & NBmxA World (The official NBA/NBmxA membership publication):

Bicycles Today & BMX Today (The official NBL membership publication under two names):

ABA Action, American BMXer, BMXer (The official ABA membership publication under three names):

USBA Racer (The official USBA membership publication):
