= Brent Patterson =

American bicycle motocross rider (born 1963)

Personal information
- Full name: Brent Hathaway Patterson
- Born: April 9, 1963 (age 63) Hayward, California, U.S.
- Height: 1.90 m (6 ft 3 in)
- Weight: 78.7 kg (174 lb)

Cycling career
- Sport: Cycling
- Discipline: Bicycle Motocross (BMX)
- Role: BMX Racer
- Rider type: Off Road

Amateur teams
- 1976: Cyclepath
- 1976-1977: AAA Restaurant Fire Control/Champion
- 1977: Speedo Racing Products

Professional teams
- 1977-1978: Speedo Racing Products
- 1978-1986: Patterson Racing Products

Brent Hathaway Patterson (born April 9, 1963, in Hayward, California United States.) is an American former "Old School" bicycle motocross (BMX) racer.

Brent Patterson is the older brother in this pair of siblings known for their success in bicycle motocross (BMX). With Brian, the Brothers Patterson are the only brothers to both hold the National No.1 Pro title in any major BMX sanctioning body; Brent in 1980 and Brian in 1982 and 1983 in the American Bicycle Association.

== Racing career milestone ==
Note: Professional first are at the national level unless otherwise indicated.

Started Racing: Early 1976 at 14 years old in Hayward, California. He was exposed to it through his friends in his neighborhood.

First race result: First Place in 14 "Expert". However, at the time classes were determined by size and weight and not proficiency. Brent Patterson, being big for his age was placed with the experts.

First local win: See above. It was the beginning of a three race winning streak.

Sanctioning body: None, unaffiliated track.

Home sanctioning body district(s): National Bicycle Association (NBA) District "N" (Northern California);

First sponsor: Cyclepath 1976

First National win:

Turned Pro: Late 1977 aged 16.

First Pro race result**: First place at the National Bicycle Association (NBA) Arizona State Fair race in Phoenix, Arizona on November 6, 1977.

First Pro win**: See above.

Height & weight at height of his career (1981–1984): Ht:6'1" Wt:~200 lbs.

Retired from the senior pro* circuit: Mid 1986, 25 years old. As is usual, many former top pro BMXers do not retire completely but race for fun or if there is a particularly large pro purse, such as the 1987 NBL World Cup. Brian and Brent occasionally raced in several large races for both reasons in 1987, but their days of seriously contending for No.1 racer title in any sanctioning body were over. Brent retired fully from BMX after not making the main at the World Cup and concentrated on Motorcycle Motocross. Patterson Racing Products went out of business in the summer of 1986 due to production problems.

*In the NBL "A" Pro/Elite; in the ABA "AA" Pro.
**At the time there was no separate pro class for pros due to the relatively small number of pros. They raced with the 16 Experts, making it a Pro/Am class essentially. This is why during the early years of the pro division the national number one racer of a sanctioning body could be either an amateur or professional. This practice continued until the NBA's 1979 season in which the pros earned separate pro points and a separate pro plate from the amateurs. The NBL and ABA followed suit a year later.

=== Career factory and major bicycle shop sponsors ===
Note: This listing only denotes the racer's primary sponsors. At any given time a racer could have numerous co-sponsors. Primary sponsorships can be verified by BMX press coverage and sponsor's advertisements at the time in question. When possible exact dates are given.

==== Amateur ====
- Cyclepath: 1976
- AAA Restaurant Fire Control/Champion: 1976
- Speedo Racing Products: October 1976-October 1977.
- Patterson Racing Products: Early November 1977 – 1986. Brent and Brian would turn pro with Patterson Racing. Detailed below.

==== Professional ====
- Patterson Racing Products: Early November 1977 – 1986. This was the family owned BMX bicycle firm started by their father Vance Patterson in late 1977 after Speedo, who Vance Patterson had invested in, showed no signs of progress toward developing a BMX racing frame, the original reason why Vance Patterson invested in the first place. It was his and his brothers only factory sponsor in their Senior pro careers (discounting AAA Fire Control.). That Speedo team, despite getting offers from other firms to join their factory teams, they opted to stay together and the original Patterson team of Brian, Brent, Kevin Riding, John Crews, and Mike Koron was formed. Vance Patterson started Patterson racing also in part to fulfill his original intent with Speedo to come out with a BMX bicycle frame and signed up the ex Speedo Team and added Richie Anderson to it. Richie would virtually become part of the Patterson family and stay with Patterson for many years, much longer than the average stay a top amateur would stay with one team. In contrast, Richie Anderson would not stay long with any one sponsor after Patterson Racing.

=== Career Bicycle Motocross titles ===
Note: Listed are District, State/Provincial/Department, Regional, National and International titles. Only sanctioning bodies that were active during the racer's career are listed. Depending on point totals of individual racers, winners of Grand Nationals do not necessarily win National titles. Series and one off Championships are also listed in block.

==== Amateur ====
National Bicycle Association (NBA)

- 1976 15 Expert Grand National Champion
- 1977 National No.2 (Pro/Am title)

National Bicycle League (NBL)

American Bicycle Association (ABA)

- None

Independent race series and Invitationals

- 1976 California Cup 15 year old class Champion

The California Cup was a non sanctioned series of three qualifying races held at three tracks (for a total of nine separate races) in three different regions of Northern California. Then the finals were held. The series was sponsored and promoted by BX-Weekly Magazine, a BMX newspaper and Rick Ankron & Rick Varner owners of (R&R) Racing Products. The finals were held at the famous Corona Raceway in Corona, California on September 5, 1976. Side note: Brent's brother Brian Patterson came in second in 11 Boys behind Eddy King.

==== Professional ====
National Bicycle Association (NBA)

- 1977 National No.2 (Pro/Am title)
- 1978 16 Expert Grandnational Champion.

In 1978 NBA professionals could still race the amateur 16 Expert class due to the still relatively small pro class.

National Bicycle League (NBL)

- 1981 Pro Cruiser Grandnational Champion
- 1982 Pro Cruiser and Pro Trophy Grandnational Champion (double)
- 1981, 1982, 1983 National No.1 Pro Cruiser

American Bicycle Association (ABA)

- 1980 National No. 1 Pro
- 1982 Pro Cruiser Grandnational Champion

Brent came in ABA No. 2 pro in 1982 when Brian became No. 1 pro for that year, the only sibling combination to do so.

United Bicycle Racers (UBR)

- 1981 Open Expert and Pro Cruiser Grandnational Champion (double)
- 1981 National No. 1 Pro Cruiser

International Bicycle Motocross Federation (IBMXF)

- 1982 Pro Cruiser Champion

Other Titles

- 1983 Jag Pro World Champion (Non sanctioned)

=== Notable accolades ===
- Named Rookie of the Year by Bicycle Motocross News for 1977. Also named number one of the five best riders in Northern California
- Brent won Bicycle Motocross Action's Number One Racer Award (NORA) for 1980.* He received 433 out of 1622 votes cast or 26.7% of the vote. He also won US$500
- He was the first to win a National No.1 plate, amateur or professional, three consecutive times and to do so consecutively in any sanctioning body (Pro cruiser 1981,'82,'83 ABA).
- Brent Patterson is a 1988 ABA BMX Hall of fame inductee.

*In the early years of the NORA cup the year the balloting was done and tallied was the year it was considered awarded. In 1983 it was switched to when the winner of the cup was presented to the public in BMX Action magazine of the following year (usually in the February or March issue) it was considered awarded and not during the closing months of the previous year when the voting and tally takes place. This was done to give the rider (and the winners of No.1 bicycle and No.1 Factory Team) maximum publicity and advantage financially. Therefore, under the new system Brent Patterson was awarded NORA in 1981.

=== BMX Product lines ===
- 1978 Patterson Racing Products "Brent Patterson Frame"

Product Evaluation:

=== Significant injuries ===
- Broke his ankle in a pickup football game in late 1978. It was a problem with Brent off and on compounded by his next major injury.
- Broke his leg in November 1979 racing Motorcycle Motocross qualifying for an amateur supercross event. His throttle stuck open and was launched more than thirty feet into the air at a jump. When he landed his leg snapped. He was laid up for four and a half months until April 1981. He was able to win the 1980 ABA no.1 pro title anyway.
- Injured shoulder in late 1980 that kept him out of the 1980 NBA Grand National.
- Injured knee at a Howell, New Jersey NBL race on July 15, 1984. Laid up for approximately six weeks. Brother Brian broke his arm at the same race. Brent Patterson's first race back was the 1984 NBL Grandnational on September 1, 1984.

=== Other significant sibling combinations in BMX ===
- Ronnie & Richie Anderson
- Mike & Eddy King
- Eric & Robby Rupe
- Richard & Gary Houseman
- Alan & Brian Foster

== Post racing career ==
Like a lot of BMXers, both Brent and his brother Brian returned to the Motorcycle Motocross roots. Both of them did rather well, with Brent racing professionally. They also raced occasionally in large BMX races in the late 1980s. Brian raced in the ABA Veteran Pro class in the mid-1990s

== BMX and general press magazine interviews and articles ==
- "Speedo's No.1 Man: Brent Patterson" Bicycle Motocross Action August 1977 Vol.2 No.3 pg.10
- "Brent Patterson" BMX Plus! February 1981 Vol.4 No.2 pg.18
- "Interview: Brent Patterson and John Crews" Bicycle Motocross Action July 1981 Vol.6 No.7 pg.100 Joint interview with former (and future) teammate John Crews.
- "Brent on Psyching" BMX Action April 1982 Vol.7 No.4 pg.35 sidebar on maintaining your psychological edge at races.
- "Brent on Cruiser Racing" BMX Action April 1982 Vol.7 No.4 pg.37 sidebar about the new Cruiser classes.
- "Top Pros Speak Out" BMX Action April 1982 Vol.7 No.4 pg.62 Joint interview with Stu Thomsen, Greg Hill, Kevin McNeal, Eric Rupe, Harry Leary, and Scott Clark, speaking about various issues facing the racing world.
- "Brent & Brian Patterson" BMX Action July 1983 Vol.8 No.7 pg.48 Joint interview with his brother Brian.
- "Devonshire" BMX Action July 1984 Vol.9 No.7 pg.33. One of eight mini-interviews with other racers held during the 1984 Devonshire Downs NBL race.
- "Flashback" Snap BMX Magazine August 1999 Vol.6 Iss.6 No.34 pg.83 Duel retrospective of the Patterson brothers.

== BMX Magazine covers ==
Bicycle Motocross News:

- December 1977 Vol.4 No.11 behind Stu Thomsen in inside of fan fold cover.

Minicycle/BMX Action & Super BMX:

Bicycle Motocross Action & Go:

- December 1977 Vol.2 No.5 (BMXA)
- November/December 1978 Vol.3 No.2 (BMXA)
- February 1980 Vol.5 No.2 slightly behind Stanley Robinson. (BMXA)
- September 1980 Vol.5 No.9 (BMXA)
- June 1982 Vol.7 No.6 with Clint Miller. (BMXA)
- April 1983 Vol.8 No.4 ahead of Toby Henderson. (BMXA)

BMX Plus!:

- January 1982 Vol.5 No.1
- September 1983 Vol.6 No.8* tied with Stu Thomsen and with Clint Miller following.
- September 1984 Vol.7 No.9 main image. In circle insert Tim Judge.

*Due to a change of ownership, BMX Plus! did not publish a May 1983 issue.
Total BMX:

Bicycles and Dirt:

- May–June 1983 Vol.1 No.9 with his and Richie Anderson's hands being jumped over by his brother Brian Patterson.

Snap BMX Magazine & Transworld BMX:

- None

NBA World & NBmxA World (The NBA/NBmxA official membership publication):

Bicycles Today & BMX Today (The NBL official membership publication under one name change):

ABA Action, American BMXer, BMXer (The ABA official membership publication under two name changes):

- April 1983 Vol.6 No.4 standing with Steve Veltman, Robert Fehd, Debbie Kalsow and Greg Hill.

USBA Racer (The official USBA membership publication):
