= Tim Judge =

American bicycle motocross rider (born 1964)

Personal information
- Full name: Timothy Judge
- Nickname: "Da Judge"
- Born: July 8, 1964 (age 62) Miami, United States
- Height: 1.80 m (5 ft 11 in)
- Weight: 75 kg (165 lb)

Cycling career
- Sport: Cycling
- Current team: Retired
- Discipline: Bicycle Motocross (BMX)
- Role: Racer
- Rider type: Off Road

Amateur teams
- 1976: Wheeler-Dealer Bicycles
- 1976-1977: MCS
- 1977-1980: Thruster
- 1980-1981: Mongoose
- 1981-1983: Hutch

Professional team
- 1983-1985: Hutch

Timothy Judge (born July 8, 1964) is a former American "Old School" professional Bicycle Motocross (BMX) racer whose prime competitive years were from 1979-1985. When he was a young racer his given name was used in the diminutive "Timmy". His nickname was "Da Judge" a play on an on the 1970s catch phrase "Here come da judge" first popularized on the 1968-1973 comedy Variety show Rowan & Martin's Laugh-In. The show was off the air for about six years when Tim Judge first came to national BMX attention, but due to the show's popularity and his name lending itself to be associated the phrase "Here comes Da Judge" was quickly associated with him. The fact was that Judge was fully rad in an era when not that many pros were.

He was known for his jumping ability and for performing jumps such as "One Footer." In this jump, the rider removes one foot from a pedal while airborne before returning it prior to landing. The maneuver later developed into the one-foot "Table Top", a jump in which while in the air you lay the frame of your parallel with the ground like a standard "Table Top" but in addition you remove the foot closes to the ground from the pedal while doing so. You then quickly bring your bicycle back up right and your foot placed back on the pedal before landing. Judge doing a one foot Table Top.

== Racing career ==
Note: Professional first are on the national level unless otherwise indicated. Started Racing: 1975 at 11 years old at the South Florida Kartway BMX track. He had first saw a television commercial for races there and asked his father to take him.

First race bicycle: Huffy.

First race result: First place in 11-year-old class.

Sanctioning Body:

First win (local): See "First race result"

First sponsor: 1976 Wheeler-Dealer Bicycles of Fort Lauderdale, Florida.

First national win:

Turned Professional: Mid 1983

First Professional race result: Second in "A" pro at the American Bicycle Association (ABA) Summernationals in Elkhart, Indiana on August 14, 1983. He also got second in Pro Cruiser.

First Professional win:

First Junior Pro* win:

First Senior Pro** win: In "A" Pro at the National Bicycle League (NBL) National No.6 in Homestead, Florida on February 9, 1985. He won US$900 (US$1,720 in 2007 Cost of Living calculator). He also came in first in Pro Cruiser winning US$400 (US$765 in 2007)

Retired: November 1985. He would later become a champion jet ski racer.

Height & weight at height of his career (1984): Ht.:5'11 Wt.:165 lb.

*In the NBL it is B"/Superclass/"A" pro (beginning with 2000 season); in the ABA it is "A" pro.
**In the NBL it is "A" pro (Elite men); in the ABA it is "AA" pro.

=== Career factory and major bike shop sponsors ===
Note: This listing only denotes the racer's primary sponsors. At any given time a racer could have numerous ever changing co-sponsors. Primary sponsorships can be verified by BMX press coverage and sponsor's advertisements at the time in question. When possible exact dates are given.

==== Amateur ====
- Wheeler-Dealer Bicycles: 1976
- MCS (Moto Cross Specialties) Bicycle Specialties: 1976-1977
- Thruster (Speed Unlimited, Inc.): 1977-1980
- Hot Plate Inc: 1980
- Thruster: 1980-Late December 1980
- Mongoose (BMX Products): December 29, 1980-Late March 1981. Judge, who was racing sponsorless in a blue and white Shimano jersey (on a bike borrowed from Greg Esser) at the 1980 World Championships was picked up by Mongoose during the race before the mains after they were impressed by his performance during the qualifying motos they signed him up before he even raced the mains.
- Hutch Hi-Performance BMX/Products: Late March 1981-Late November 1985 Tim would turn pro with this sponsor.

==== Professional ====
- Hutch Hi-Performance BMX/Products: Late March 1981-Late November 1985.

=== Career bicycle motocross titles ===
Note: Listed are District, State/Provincial/Department, Regional, National, and International titles in italics. "Defunct" refers to the fact of that sanctioning body in question no longer existing at the start of the racer's career or at that stage of his/her career. Depending on point totals of individual racers, winners of Grand Nationals do not necessarily win National titles. Series and one off Championships are also listed in block.

==== Amateur ====
National Bicycle Association (NBA)

- None

National Bicycle League (NBL)

- 1976 11-12 Class "D" Winternational BMX Series Champion
- 1976 11-12 Class "D" National No.1
- 1977 11-12 Class "D" National Championship Champion
- 1977 11-12 "D" Expert National No.1
- 1978 13 Expert National No.1
- 1980 15 & Up Schwinn Orange Bowl Classic Champion
- 1980 15 Expert National No.2
- 1980 Jag Overall World Champion

American Bicycle Association (ABA)

- 1982 17 Expert & 15-25 Cruiser North Central Gold Cup Champion
- 1982 15-25 Cruiser Northeastern Gold Cup Champion
- 1982 Florida District-1 (FLA-1) Amateur & Cruiser No.1

International Bicycle Motocross Federation (IBMXF)

- 1983 16 & Over Expert Third Place World Champion
- 1983 18-24 Cruiser World Champion

==== Professional ====
National Bicycle Association (NBA)

- None

National Bicycle League (NBL)

- None

American Bicycle Association (ABA)

- None

United States Bicycle Motocross Association (USBA)

- None

International Bicycle Motocross Federation (IBMXF)

- None

Pro Series Championships and Invitationals

=== Notable accolades ===
- Named one of "1984's Hottest Rookie Pros" by BMX Action Magazine.
- Named #40 of the 100 greatest BMXers in the December 1993 issue of American BMXer.

=== BMX product lines ===
- "Timmy Judge Replica" Frame for Thruster in 1979.

Product analysis:
Bicycle Motocross Action December 1979 Vol.4 No.5 pg.90

- "Da Judge" Frame and Fork series for Hutch in April 1983

product analysis:
BMX Action April 1985 Vol.10 No.4 pg.38

- "Judge II" frame and fork from Hutchins Performance Products in July 1990.

product analysis:
BMX Plus! October 1990 Vol.13 No.10 pg.40

=== Significant injuries ===
- On June 6, 1981 Judge suffered a major automobile accident when the Volkswagen he was driving struck an opposite coming car head on. He was propelled through the windshield. He suffered torn ligaments in his right leg and had to have stitches in his face and shoulder. It was reported that he could be laid up for a year recuperating but his first race back was the NBL "Miami Connection" National in Miami, Florida on June 28, 1981.
- Injured right hand at the invitational 1985 Kellogg's Frosties BMX Championships in Birmingham, England on May 25, 1985. The injury occurred in the third moto of the first round. He had crashed on a set of double jumps, but that was not what caused the injury. After he landed British pro racer Jamie Vance, after jumping the doubles himself, landed on Judge's hand, dislocating his middle finger and perhaps breaking the knuckle. Prior to having it examined Judge tried to race with his injured hand but it progressively got more swollen and painful. Two days later he dropped out of the competition and sought proper medical attention. After being treated by English paramedics and doctors he flew back home to be attended by his personal doctor.

== Post BMX career ==
In 1984, Tim left BMX racing to try his hand at watercraft racing and motor building. During his career in 1985, Tim captured several national and world titles piloting his Yamaha Blaster. Personally responsible for over 40 world titles, Tim served as RIVA/Team Yamaha's chief performance mechanic as well as a racer until late 2003. Then he started his own company Judge Motorsports, that he still runs today

== BMX press magazine interviews and articles ==
- "Here Comes The Judge"Super BMX May 1981 Vol.8 No.5 pg.24
- "Tim Judge: World Champion" BMX Plus! June 1981 Vol.4 No.6 pg.26
- "Timmy Judge" BMX Action September 1983 Vol.8 No.9 pg.64
- "United they conquer: The Rise and Rise of Team Hutch" BMX Action Bike December 1983 Iss.14 pg.50 Article about the Hutch BMX team as a group and as individuals.
- "Racing Tips From 'Tabletop' Tim Judge" Bicycles and Dirt August 1984 Vol.2 No.9 pg.14
- "1984's Hottest Rookie Pros" BMX Action October 1984 Vol.9 No.10 pg.75
- "Moto-Notes: Chewin' The Fat With Timmy Judge" BMX Action December 1984 Vol.9 No.12 pg.72
- "Da Judge" Super BMX & Freestyle July 1985 Vol.12 No.7 pg.42

== BMX magazine covers ==
Bicycle Motocross News:

- None

Minicycle/BMX Action & Super BMX:

- Super BMX April 1981 Vol.8 No.4 In top corner insert. Main image is Bobby Encinas.
- Super BMX September 1982 Vol.9 No.9
- Super BMX July 1985 Vol.12 No.7

Bicycle Motocross Action & Go

- BMXA October 1979 Vol.4 Nol.10

BMX Plus!:

- October 1980 Vol.3 No.10
- December 1983 Vol.6 No.11* In inset with Stu Thomsen, Greg Hill, Nelson Chanady and others at beginning of national banner presentation at the start of a race. Brian Patterson is the main image.
- September 1984 Vol.7 No.9 in circular insert with Brian Patterson as main image.
- November 1985 Vol.8 No.11 in main image jumping with motorcycle motocross (MX) racer Johnny O'Mara. In top insert freestyler Eddie Fiola, in bottom left insert O'Mara again, in bottom right inser Freestyler Mike Dominquez.

*Due to a change in ownership, BMX Plus! did not publish a May 1983 issue.
Total BMX:

Bicycles and Dirt (ABA Publication):

- October 1982 Vol.1 No.2 (55) ahead of Eddy King (9) and unknown (175).
- August 1984 Vol.2 No.9 with freestyler Woody Itson in main image. In insert Bart McDaniel (17), Eric Rupe (33) and Harry Leary (Diamondback).

Bicross Magazine (French publication):

- Août (August) 1984 No.23
- 1985

NBA World & NBmxA World (The official NBA/NBmxA publication):

Bicycles Today & BMX Today (The official NBL publication under two names)"

ABA Action, American BMXer, BMXer (The official ABA publication under three names):

USBA Racer (The official USBA membership publication):
