= Adam Banton =

American cyclist

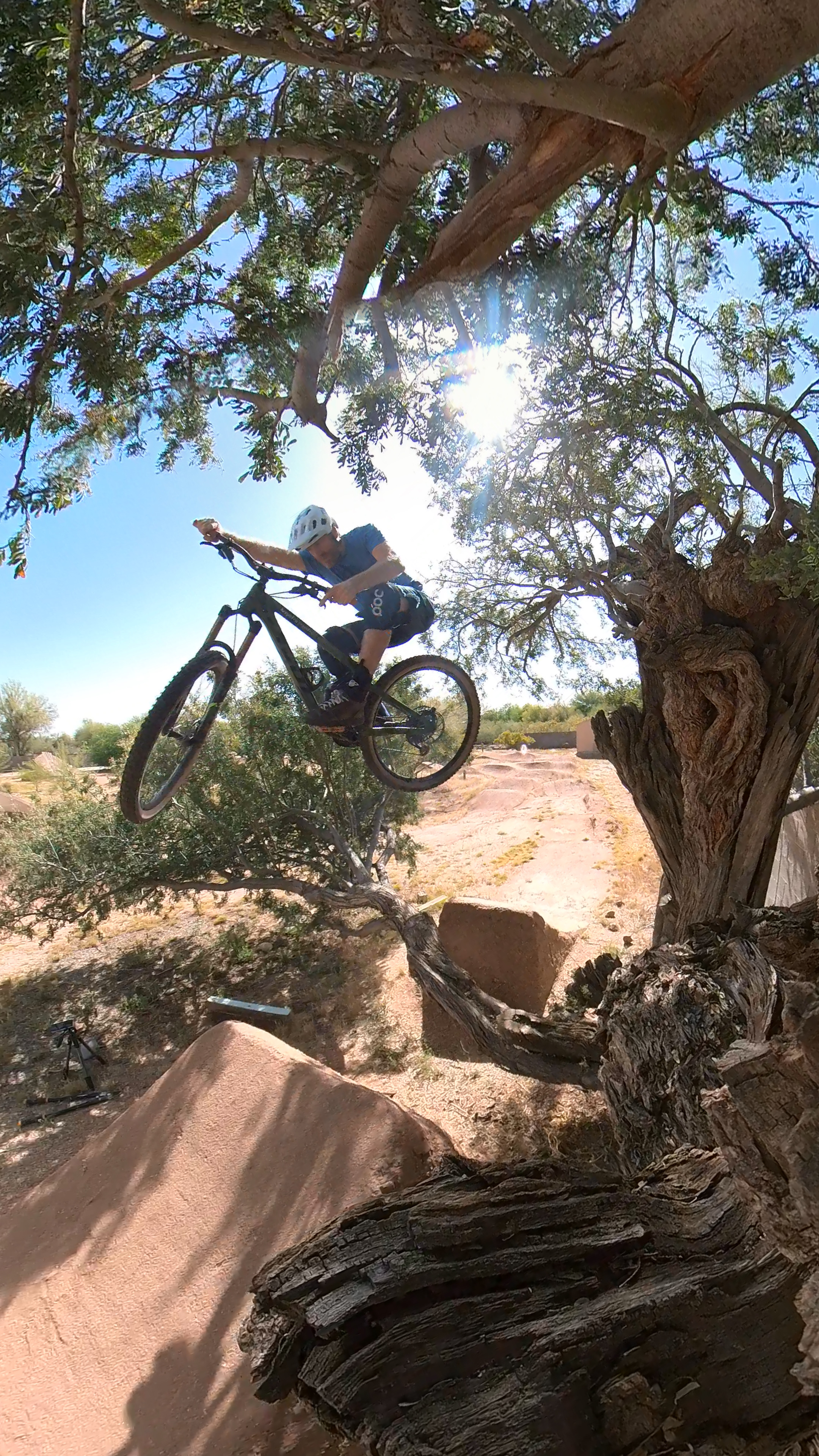

Adam Banton (born February 28, 1975, in Nokesville, Virginia) is an American freestyle BMX rider and MTB rider, professional musician and part owner of The Biker and Baker granola. He's known to have resided in Phoenix, Arizona. His riding style is regarded as progressive and creative while not limited to any specific genre of Freestyle BMX. He began riding in 1987 after being influenced by a Dennis McCoy demo clip on his local news station.

Adam is currently an Ambassador or sponsored by Tasco-MTB Odyssey, Badger Balm Space Brace Redmond Relyte. He has had two different signature Odyssey grips, and has had a signature Odyssey "B.E.T.A." backpack. Adam's personal bike was added to the Flick Trix BMX finger bike line. He also has worked with Armourdillo on a signature belt and wallet series.

Among other unique tricks Adam was acknowledged and credited for inventing the downside tailwhip by RideBMX Magazine in 2016.

Adam has also been featured in multiple magazines such as Dig BMX, BMX Plus!, Ride BMX, Ride UK. and Woodward West Winter Camp brochure

Adam and his music have been featured in a series of BMX videos spanning over 15 years. He has released four full-length albums and his third on vinyl most recently. Adam has been a featured athlete on Fuel TV's Daily Habit, performing from his self-titled first recording Adam Banton and his second Songs from Here and There. Additionally, he was a featured athlete and music performer on Props Rock n Roll Road Fools (tour) that also aired on Fuel TV.

He is also part owner of The Biker and Baker granola launched in 2018. Which set out to provide Organic and gluten free granola with anti-inflammatory ingredients. He makes music like his latest fourth full-length album "INDIVISIBLE" Adam can be found working on short, original compositions that can be heard throughout the BMX and action sports industry. He cites his father and his uncle, as major musical influences.
