= Brian Patterson =

American bicycle motocross rider

Personal information
- Full name: Brian Patterson
- Born: January 4, 1965 (age 61) Hayward, California, U.S.
- Height: 1.91 m (6 ft 3 in)
- Weight: ~88.5 kg (195 lb)

Cycling career
- Sport: Cycling
- Current team: Retired
- Discipline: Bicycle Motocross (BMX)
- Role: Racer
- Rider type: Off Road

Amateur teams
- 1976: AAA Restaurant Fire Control
- 1976-1977: Speedo Racing Products
- 1977-1982: Patterson Racing Products

Professional teams
- 1982-1986: Patterson Racing Products
- 1986-1992: (Retired for six years)
- 1993-1995: US Boss Racing

Major wins
- 1983 Murray World Cup of BMX II

Brian Patterson (born January 4, 1965) is an American former "Old School" bicycle motocross (BMX) racer.

Brian Patterson is the younger of the most potent sibling combinations BMX has ever seen. With Brent, the Brothers Patterson are the only brothers to both hold the National No.1 Pro title in any major BMX sanctioning body. Brent in 1980 and Brian in 1982 and 1983 in the American Bicycle Association (ABA). They are also the only sibling combination to hold both the no.1 and no.2 national pro plate simultaneously with a major sanctioning body with Brian being ABA number one pro and Brent number two pro in 1982.

== Racing career milestones ==
Note: Professional first are on the national level unless otherwise indicated.

Started racing: At least early 1976 at 11 years old. Took a hiatus from racing beginning in 1979 at 13 due to burn out but resumed racing late 1980 at 15 years old.

First race result: Possibly March 20, 1976, when he won 10 & 11 Novice Class at the Pioneer Area. His brother Brent came in third in 14 novice.

First local win: See above.

Home sanctioning body district(s): National Bicycle Association (NBA) District "N" (Northern California);

First sponsor: A local Schwinn Bicycle shop in Hayward, California.

Turned Pro: Early 1982 at Age 17.

First Professional race result: Third place at 1982 American Bicycle Association (ABA) Winter Nationals in Chandler, Arizona. It was his only "A" pro race before being moved up to "AA" pro by ABA Vice President Gene Roden at Brian's request.

First Professional win: April 10, 1982, at the ABA Rondo North American Championship Classic in St. Paul, Minnesota, in "AA" Pro and Pro Open.

First Junior Pro* result: See "First Professional race result".

First Senior Pro** result: See "First Professional win".

First Senior Pro Win: See above.

Height & weight at his height of his career: (1982–1984): Ht: 6' 3" Wt:~195 lbs.

Retired from the senior pro circuit: Mid 1986 at age 21. As is usual, many former top pro BMXers do not retire completely but race for fun or if there is a particularly large pro purse, such as the 1987 NBL World Cup. Brian occasionally raced in several large races for both reasons in 1987, although both Brian and Brent raced Motorcycle Motocross professionally. Both would race BMX again when they attended the ABA Spring Nationals in 1991. Neither made the main. Both Brent's and Brian's days seriously contending for Senior Pro No.1 racer were over. However, not his career. After a six year hiatus Brian did come back to race in the mid-1990s in the ABA's Veteran Pro Class (along with fellow "Old Schoolers" Harry Leary and Eric Rupe) and did well. He was even reunited with his old Patterson Racing teammate Richie Anderson on the U.S. Boss Racing Products racing team. As for Patterson Racing Products, it went out of business in the summer of 1986 due to production problems.

*In the NBL it is "B" Pro/Superclass/"A" pro (depending on the era); in the ABA "A" Pro.
**In the NBL it is "A" Pro/All Pro/"AA" pro/Elite Men (depending on the era); in the ABA "AA" Pro.

== Career factory and major bicycle shop sponsors ==
Note: This listing only denotes the racer's primary sponsors. At any given time a racer could have numerous co-sponsors. Primary sponsorships can be verified by BMX press coverage and sponsor's advertisements at the time in question. When possible exact dates are given.

=== Amateur ===
- AAA Restaurant Fire Control: 1976
- Speedo Racing Products: October 1976-Early November 1977.
- Patterson Racing Products: Early November 1977 – 1986. Brain and Brent would turn pro with Patterson Racing. Detailed below.

=== Professional ===
- Patterson Racing Products: Early November 1977 – 1986. This was the family owned BMX bicycle firm started by their father Vance Patterson in late 1977 after Speedo, who Vance Patterson had invested in, showed no signs of progress toward developing a BMX racing frame, the original reason why Vance Patterson invested in the first place. It was his and his brothers only factory sponsor in their Senior pro careers (Brian would ride for Boss Racing Products in the mid-1990s in the Masters/Veterans Pro classes). That Speedo team, despite getting offers from other firms to join their factory teams, they opted to stay together and thus the original Patterson team of Brian, Brent, Kevin Riding, John Crews, and Mike Koron was formed. Vance Patterson started Patterson racing also in part to fulfill his original intent with Speedo to come out with a BMX bicycle frame and signed up the ex Speedo Team and added Richie Anderson to it. Richie would virtually become part of the Patterson family and stay with Patterson for many years, much longer than the average top amateur would stay with one team.
- Retired for approximately six years (1986–1992).
- U.S. Boss Racing Products: January 1993-through 1995. Being bitten by the "BMX Bug" again, he restarted his BMX career in 1993 by racing in the ABA's Veteran Pro class. On Boss, he was reunited with John Crews, Richie Anderson and Scott Clark, his old Speedo and Patterson Racing Products teammates.

== Career Bicycle Motocross titles ==
Note: Listed are District, State/Provincial/Department, Regional, National, and International titles in italics. "Defunct" refers to the fact of that sanctioning body in question no longer existing at the start of the racer's career or at that stage of his/her career. Depending on point totals of individual racers, winners of Grand Nationals do not necessarily win National titles. Series and one off Championships are also listed in block.

=== Amateur ===
National Bicycle Association (NBA)

- 1976 11 Expert Grand National Champion
- 1977 12 Expert Grand National Champion

United Bicycle Racers (UBR)

- 1981 16 & Over Expert Grandnational Champion

International Bicycle Motocross Federation (IBMXF)

- 1981 16 & Over Expert International Champion.

=== Professional ===
National Bicycle Association (NBA)

- None

National Bicycle League (NBL)

- 1983 National No.2 Pro

United Bicycle Racers (UBR)

- 1984 Pro Cruiser Grandnational Champion

American Bicycle Association (ABA)

- 1982 "Pro Car Main" Grandnational Champion, "AA" Pro Grandnational Champion and Pro Open Grandnational Champion (Triple)
- 1983 "Pro Car Main" Grandnational Champion
- 1982, 1983 National No.1 Pro. Brian's brother Brent came in ABA No.2 pro in 1982 when Brian became No.1 pro for that year, the only sibling combination to do so.
- 1984 Pro Cruiser Grandnational Champion

United States Bicycle Motocross Association (USBA)

- 1984 Pro Cruiser Grandnational Champion
- 1984 Pro Cruiser National No.2
- 1985 Gatorade Pro Race of Champions Champion

International Bicycle Motocross Federation (IBMXF)

- 1983 20" Pro and Pro Cruiser Murray World Cup II Champion
- 1985 20" Pro Murray World Cup IV Champion

=== Notable Accolades ===
- Super BMX magazine's Racer of the Year for 1984. No voter totals, breakdowns or percentage of the vote given.
- Brian Patterson is a 1988 ABA BMX Hall of Fame Inductee.

=== Significant injuries ===
- Broke wrist in first moto of the final race of the 1983 ESPN Pro Spectacular in Burbank, California, on December 27, 1983. He raced five more times (the last two motos, a quarter final, and a twice ran semi final. He did not transfer to the main after that semi. He then went to the hospital before confirming his belief he had a broken wrist. Two months before his Brother Brent broke his wrist in a practice session.
- Broke arm at Howell, New Jersey NBL race on July 15, 1984. Had to undergo surgery to have plates and screws implanted and was laid up for two months, missing the NBL Grandnational. His first race back was the ABA Great Northwest National in Monroe, Washington, on September 16, 1984. It was supposed to be a three month lay up, but Brian had to race in order to get the requisite number of ABA races he had to race-10-in order to keep the Pontiac Trans Am he won for becoming No.1 pro in 1983. Brother Brent injured his knee at the same race.

== BMX & general press magazine interviews & articles ==
- "The Other Patterson" Super BMX March 1983 Vol.10 No.3 pg.53
- "The Best Pro: Brian Patterson" Bicycles and Dirt May–June 1983 Vol.1 No.9 pg.48
- "Brent & Brian Patterson" BMX Action July 1983 Vol.8 No.7 pg.48 Joint interview with his brother Brent.
- "Brian Patterson" BMX Plus! December 1983 Vol.6 No.11* pg.76
- "The Unquestioned Best!" Super BMX March 1984 Vol.11 No.3 pg.73. One of the four ABA No.1 title holders of 1983 profiled.
- "Flashback" Snap BMX Magazine August 1999 Vol.6 Iss.6 No.34 pg.83 Dual retrospective of the Patterson brothers.

*Due to a change in printing companies while being acquired by Daisy/Hi-Torque Publishing Co., Inc., BMX Plus! technically did not publishing a May 1983 issue. The very next issue on the newsstands was called the June 1983 issue.

== BMX magazine covers ==
Minicycle/BMX Action & Super BMX:

- March 1983 Vol.10 No.3 main image. In insert celebrities Michael Dudikoff & Kathy Maisaik
- March 1984 Vol.11 No.3 main image & in insert with fellow racers Doug Davis, Brett Allen & Cheri Elliott.
- Super BMX Presents The 1985 World Championship Winter 1985. To Gary Ellis's (47) left in third with Eric Rupe in fourth to Harry Leary's behind/left. Harry Leary (85) is in the rear foreground in second. (SBMX special edition).

Bicycle Motocross Action & Go:

- August 1983 Vol.8 No.8 in second place behind Harry Leary and ahead of Clint Miller in third.

BMX Plus!:

- December 1983 Vol.6 No.11* In inset Stu Thomsen, Greg Hill, Nelson Chanady, Tim Judge and others at beginning of national banner presentation at the start of a race.
- January 1984 Vol.7 No.1 in insert. Mike Dominquez main image; Eric Garcez in second insert.
- March 1984 Vol.7 No.3 with Clint Miller.
- September 1984 Vol.7 No.9 with Tim Judge in insert.
- July 1984 Vol.7 No.7 in third place behind Stu Thomsen & Pete Loncarevich. In insets Mercury Morgan (top "rip"), freestyler Mike Dominguez (circle).

*Due to change of ownership, BMX Plus! did not publish a May issue in 1983.
Total BMX:

- March 1983. In insert Steve Veltman.

Bicycles and Dirt:

- May–June 1983 Vol.1 No.9 jumping over the hands of Brent Patterson and Richie Anderson.

Snap BMX Magazine & Transworld BMX

BMX World:

NBA World & NBmxA World (The official NBA/NBmxA publication):

Bicycles Today & BMX Today (The official NBL publication under two names):

ABA Action, American BMXer, BMXer (The official ABA publication. Three names but the same publication):

- October 1983 Vol.6 No.10 In fourth place directly behind Robert Fehd (472) who is leading and Tinker Jaurez (54) in third place on the outside and Shawn Texas (114) in second on the inside.
- April 1984 Vol.7 No.3 lower right with (clockwise) Doug Davis, Brett Allen, Cheri Elliott, Eddy King, Brent Romero and Todd Guss.
- June 1984 Vol.7 No.5 ahead of Eddy King.

USBA Racer (The official USBA membership publication):
