= D.D. Leone =

American bicycle motocross rider (born 1966)

D. D. Leone
Personal information
- Full name: Dominick Donald Leone Jr.
- Nicknames: "D.D." "Ragin' Cajun", "The Marrero Flash"
- Born: February 27, 1966 (age 60) United States
- Height: 1.88 m (6 ft 2 in)
- Weight: 80.3–82.7 kg (177–182 lb)

Cycling career
- Sport: Cycling
- Current team: Retired
- Discipline: Bicycle Motocross (BMX)
- Role: Racer
- Rider type: Off Road

Amateur teams
- 1982: Capitol Schwinn
- 1982-1984: Redline Engineering

Professional teams
- 1984-1985: Redline Engineering
- 1985: Zeronine
- 1985: Vector
- 1985-1986: D.D's Bikes
- 1986: Zeronine
- 1986: Vector
- 1986: D.D's Bikes
- Early 1986-Early 1988: (two year hiatus)
- 1988: Tip
- 1988-1989: Free Agent
- 1989: Tip
- 1989-1991: Karstan

Major wins
- 1985 Murray World Cup IV $5,000

Dominick Donald Leone Jr. (born February 27, 1966, from Marrero, Louisiana United States) was a professional American "Current School" Bicycle Motocross (BMX) racer whose prime competitive years were from 1982 to 1985. His nickname was "D.D." and "The Ragin' Cajun". The former the initials of his first and middle names the latter an obvious reference to his Louisianan background the home of the Cajun.

== Racing career milestones ==
Note: Professional first are on the National level unless otherwise indicated. Included under the title of "National" are American Bicycle Association (ABA) Gold Cup Qualifiers.

Started racing: 1977 at 12 years old. Some of his friends persuaded him to go with them and watch them race at a track in a field near his house.

Sanctioning body: ()

Home sanctioning body district(s): American Bicycle Association (ABA) Louisiana District 2 (Lou-2) in 1982

First race result: First place.

First win (local): See above.

First race bike: Redline.

First sponsor:

First national win:

Turned professional: January 1984

First professional race result: Second Place in "B" Pro at the National Bicycle League (NBL) War of the Stars (WOS) VII in Pompano Beach, Florida, on January 13, 1984. He won US$200. He also came in second place in Pro Cruiser, also winning US$200 The 1984 US$200 winnings in each case is the equivalent to US$417 in 2010 funds

First professional win: In "A" Pro at the Gilley's Gold Cup Qualifier in Pasadena, Texas, on March 17, 1984. He won his first proper National the next day in "A" Pro at the Gilley's National. Probably in "B" pro at the NBL WOS VII National in Memphis, Tennessee, on April 19, 1984

First Junior Men Pro* race result: See "First professional race result"

First Junior Men Pro win: See "First professional win"

First Senior Men Pro** race result: Possibly second in "A" Pro at the United States Bicycle Motocross Association (USBA) Houston National in Houston, Texas, on March 2, 1985.

First Senior Men Pro win: Possibly in "A" Pro at the USBA Grand National in Dallas, Texas, on October 27, 1985.

Retired: Originally in early 1986. The last race his name appears in the national results was at the NBL War of the Stars IX Memphis Classic National in Memphis, Tennessee, on March 23, 1986 (Day 2). He came in first in Pro Cruiser. but in early 1988 Gene Roden convinced him to come out of retirement and back into serious competition that year concentrating on Pro Cruiser class. He retired for the second and final time in November 1991 after the ABA Grand National in Oklahoma City, Oklahoma, on December 1, 1991, in which he came in third place in Pro Cruiser winning US$100.

Height & weight at height of his career (1984): Ht:6'2" Wt:195 lb. Lorene's weight would steadily go up throughout his career. In November 1982 after gaining national prominence and a Redline sponsorship a few weeks before he weighed 163 lb at 6'1" tall

*In the NBL "B" Pro/Super Class/"A" pro (depending on the era); in the ABA "A" pro.
**In the NBL "A" Pro/All Pros/Pro Class/"AA" Pro/"Elite Men"; in the ABA "AA" pro.

=== Career factory and major bike shop sponsors ===
Note: This listing only denotes the racer's primary sponsors. At any given time a racer could have numerous ever-changing co-sponsors. Primary sponsorships can be verified by BMX press coverage and sponsor's advertisements at the time in question. When possible exact dates are used.

==== Amateur ====
- Capitol Schwinn: 1982-September 1982
- Redline Engineering: September 1982-December 1984 Leone started with a support sponsorship on the weekend of the ABA Fall Nationals in Lancaster, California, on October 16, 1982 He would turn pro with this sponsor.

==== Professional ====
- Redline Engineering: September 1982 – December 1984. His last race for Redline was the NBL Heart of Dixie National in Montgomery, Alabama, in December 1984.
- Zeronine: Early June 1985 – late June 1985. After being unsponsored for approximately five and a half months, Leone was picked up by Zeronine. His first race for Zeronine was the 1985 Murray World Cup of BMX IV in Nashville, Tennessee, on June 23, 1985. He won Pro Cruiser and US$5,000 beating Ron Anderson who came in second winning US$2,000
- Vector: Late June 1985 – November 1985 He only stayed with Zeronine for three weeks before going to Vector. His first race for Vector was the NBL National in Denver, Colorado, on June 29, 1985, winning in Pro Cruiser and a seventh in "A" Pro.
- D.D.'s Wheels: December 1985 – February 1986. He left Vector and sponsored himself through the Bike shop he had just started D.D's Wheels His first race for his shop was the USBA National in Banton Rouge, Louisiana on January 4, 1986. His Bike shop won team trophy.
- Zeronine: February 1986 – April 1986 After about two months of riding for his own bike shop, he was back on Zeronine. His first race was the NBL War of the Stars VII Montgomery, Alabama, on February 22, 1986. He had been having trouble with sponsors ever since leaving Redline. This second tour with Zeronine only lasted approximately three months.
- Vector: May 1986 – June 1986
- D.D.'s Wheels: June 1986. He was once again on Vector by the USBA National in San Antonio, Texas, on May 17, 1986 That only lasted for a brief time and he raced at least once more with his self sponsorship with "D.D's Bikes". He apparently he went into quiet retirement at this time due to the fact that his name ceases to show up in the results after Summer of 1986.
- Year and a half hiatus: July 1986 – early 1988
- TIP Distributing: February 1988 – May 1988. Gene Roden of Tip Distributing brought D.D. out of retirement. Leone had a very noticeable "beer belly" when he was at the 1987 ABA Grand National strictly as a spectator with Roden, but Roden told people at the event that Leone would be back. Leone was living in Marrero, Louisiana, working as a welder but it wasn't what he really wanted to do with his life and therefore had accepted Roden's proposal to come out of retirement. Roden put D.D., who was living with Roden at the time (in a spare room of Roden's house ), on a strict training program. He had weighed around 242 lb. when Roden talked to him about making his comeback. His debut national was the ABA Winter Nationals in Chandler, Arizona, on February 13, 1988. He came in second in Pro Cruiser but didn't make it out of the semis in "AA" Pro. by that time he had reduced to 232 lb. with a further intent to slim down another 25 lb. to 207 lb.
- Free Agent: May 15, 1988 – December 1989 He was picked up by Free Agent right after the NBL War of the Stars (WoS) National in Houston, Texas, on May 15, 1989. The day before, May 14, was his first Senior Pro victory since returning to racing. The ABA Spring National in Roseville, California, on May 21, 1988, was his first race with Free Agent.
- TIP Distributing: January 1989 – May 1989
- Kastan: May 1989 – November 1991 His first race for Kastan was the ABA Lonestar national in Austin, Texas, on May 12, 1989 He retired for the final time after the ABA Grand National in Oklahoma City, Oklahoma, on December 1, 1991.

=== Career bicycle motocross titles ===
Note: Listed are District, State/Provincial/Department, Regional, National, and International titles in italics. Depending on point totals of individual racers, winners of Grand Nationals do not necessarily win National titles. Only sanctioning bodies active during the racer's career are listed.

==== Amateur ====
National Bicycle Association (NBA)

National Bicycle League (NBL)

- 1983 18-24 Cruiser Grand National Champion
- 1983 18-24 Cruiser National No.1

American Bicycle Association (ABA)

- 1982 15-25 Cruiser US Gold Cup Champion
- 1983 17-21 Cruiser and Cruiser Trophy Dash U.S. Gold Cup Champion (Double)
- 1982 17 Expert and 15-25 Cruiser and 15 & Over Trophy Dash Grand National Champion (Triple)
- 1982 Louisiana District 2 (Lou-2) 20" and Cruiser No.1
- 1982 17 Expert and 15-25 Third Place Jag World Champion (ABA Sanctioned)
- 1983 National No.3

United States Bicycle Motocross Association (USBA)

- None

Fédération Internationale Amateur de Cyclisme (FIAC)*

- None

International Bicycle Motocross Federation (IBMXF)*

- 1982 16 Expert and 16-24 Cruiser Grand Prix of the United States Champion (Double)
- 1983 18-24 Cruiser First Place Murray World Cup II Champion

Union Cycliste Internationale (UCI)*

==== Professional ====
National Bicycle League (NBL)

- 1984 "B" Pro Grand National Champion
- 1985 Pro Cruiser Murray World Cup of BMX IV Champion
- 1985 Pro Cruiser National No.2

American Bicycle Association (ABA)

- 1985 Pro Cruiser Grand National Champion
- 1990 Pro Cruiser U.S. Open West Champion
- 1990 Pro Cruiser Gold Cup West Champion
- 1990 Pro Cruiser and Pro Open Race of Champions (ROC) Champion
- 1990 Pro Cruiser National No.2
- 1991 Pro Cruiser National No.2

United States Bicycle Motocross Association (USBA)

- 1985 Pro Cruiser Race of Champions (ROC) Champion
- 1985 "A" Pro and Pro Cruiser Grand National Champion (Double)
- 1985 "A" Pro and Pro Cruiser National No.3

Fédération Internationale Amateur de Cyclisme (FIAC)*

- None

International Bicycle Motocross Federation (IBMXF)*

- 1984 "B" Pro First Place Murray World Cup III Champion (NBL co sanctioned)

'Union Cycliste Internationale (UCI)*

Pro Series Championships

=== Notable accolades ===
- Named unofficially by BMX Plus! as Newcomer of the Year for 1983.
- Named as one of BMX Action's "Terrible Ten" top ten amateurs for 1983
- Named as one of BMX Action's "1984's Hottest Rookie Pros." list of top new pros for 1984
- Leone is a National BMX Hall of Fame 2009 Inductee.

=== Significant injuries ===
- Suffered an Achilles tendon pull during practice at the ABA Grand Nationals on the weekend of November, 1983. It removed him from competition. He also missed the Jag World Championships. He returned after a two-month and a half lay off in January 1984.
- Injured in early 1984 first race back after a few weeks was the NBL War of the Stars (WOS) VII National in Memphis, Tennessee, on April 19, 1984 He would be injured for most of 1984.
- Injured some ligaments in his left shoulder in August 1988.

=== Racing habits and traits ===
- Starting out as a rather slim 16-year-old amateur, he steadily gained weight throughout his career (including during a year and a half retirement) He had weighed around 242 lb. When Roden talked to him about making his comeback. in late 1987 His debut national out of retirement was the ABA Winter Nationals in Chandler, Arizona, on February 13, 1988. He weighed 232 lb. By the time of the NBL WoS National in Norco, California, on June 18, 1988, he weighed 229 lb. In late 1988 then Free Agent Team Manager Bill Starlin (father of racer and teammate of Leone, Galen Starlin) put him on probation on pain of not being sent to the 1989 ABA Winternationals in Chandler, Arizona if he didn't lose 30 lb, by February 1989, the month Winternationals were held. Leone did attend the ABA Winternationals. At the time he weighed 225 lb. If he did lose 30 lb by then that would mean he weighed as much as 255 lb. at the time of the ultimatum. By the first quarter of 1991 his stated weight was 218 pounds at six feet one inches tall.

== BMX press magazine interviews and articles ==
- "The Marrero Flash" BMX Action May 1983 Vol.8 No.5 pg.52 Sidebar biography of Leone.
- "D.D.'s PL-24 Setup" BMX Action May 1983 Vol.8 No.5 pg.59 Sidebar about Leone's Redline Cruiser.
- "Racing Tips--Who Dat Back Der?" BMX Action December 1983 Vol.8 No.12 pg.87 Sidebar article in which Leone gives tips on when it is to one's advantage to looking back to see who might be passing you and when it is not.
- "The Redline Racers:" Super BMX December 1984 Vol.11 No.12 pg.33 mention in the article about the 1984 Redline team George Seevers, Jon Anderson, Eric Garcez, Robert Swick and Trae Brannon.
- "Just Crusin'" BMX Plus! August 1991 Vol.14 No.8 pg.24 Duel but separate interviews of Leone and Kenny May about their competing in Pro Cruiser Class in general and against each other

== BMX magazine covers ==
Note: Only magazines that were in publication at the time of the racer's career(s) are listed unless specifically noted.

Minicycle/BMX Action & Super BMX:

Bicycle Motocross Action & Go:

BMX Plus!:

- April 1984 Vol.7 No.4 (1) in left middle inset. In separate insets Pete Loncarevich (73L bottom), freestyler Mike Dominguez (right middle); and Richie Anderson (top).

BMX World

ABA Action, American BMXer, BMXer (the official BMX publication of the ABA under three different names):

- ABA Action January 1983 Vol.6 No.1 (26) with Paul Grossrau (5) to his right.

USBA Racer: (The official USBA membership publication)

- Inside of American BMXer July 1986 Vol.7 No.6 pg.49) on the extreme left hand side coming into fram behind Todd Slavik (10).
