= Matt Hadan =

American bicycle motocross rider (born 1970)

Personal information
- Full name: Matthew Merle Hadan
- Born: June 4, 1970 (age 56) Azusa, California, United States
- Height: 1.80 m (5 ft 11 in)
- Weight: 81.6 kg (180 lb)

Cycling career
- Sport: Cycling
- Current team: Retired
- Discipline: Bicycle Motocross (BMX)
- Role: Racer
- Rider type: Off Road

Amateur teams
- 1981–1983: Monirovia Schwinn
- 1983–1984: Bandito Racing
- 1984: Cycle Pro/GHP
- 1984–1985: Diamondback
- 1986: S&K Cycle Center
- 1986–1987: Free Agent
- 1987–1989: Diamondback

Professional teams
- 1989–1991: Diamondback
- 1991: Snap-On Tools
- 1991: Aggro Tech
- 1991: Super Tech
- 1991–1992: U.S. Boss
- 1993–1994: Kastan Engineering
- 1994–1995: Balance
- 1995–1996: Redline Bicycles
- 1996–1997: Trek/Gary Fisher
- 1998–2000: Torker Bicycles
- 2000–2001: Redline Bicycles
- 2003: Capri

Matthew Merle Hadan (b. June 4, 1970 from Azusa, California U.S.) is an American professional "Old/Mid School" Bicycle Motocross (BMX) racer whose prime competitive years were from 1985 to 1995. Hadan was nicknamed early in his career as "The Master" and later "The Diesel".

== Racing career milestones ==
Note: Professional first are on the national level unless otherwise indicated.

Started racing: At 10 years old in 1981. He first noticed BMX in a BMX magazine in 1980 featuring racer Jason Jensen and his involvement in the sport and young Matt wanted to try it. His father took him to the Azusa, California, track and Matt thought it looked like fun.

Sanctioning body:

Sanctioning body home district(s): American Bicycle Association (ABA) District California 13 (CA-13) (1985)

First race result: First place in 10 beginner class. He would win two more consecutive beginner races and then a few months later turn expert.

First win (local):

First sponsor: Monrovia Schwinn 1981

First national win: See above.

Turned Professional: December 1989.

First Professional race result: Sixth place in Pro class at the National Bicycle League (NBL) Christmas Classic on December 28, 1989. He won US$80 (US$132.71 in 2007). Cost of Living Calculator He also came in third place in Pro Award-winning US$60 (US$99.53 2007). Beginning with the 1990 season the NBL "B" pro became the Pro/Am "Superclass" and the Senior "A" Pro class became simply the Pro Class. First Professional win: In Pro Open at the American Bicycle Association (ABA) Silver Dollar Nationals in Reno, Nevada on January 14, 1990.

First Junior Pro* race result: See "First Professional race result". Any pro could race pro class, skipping the then new NBL Pro/Am superclass.

First Junior Pro win: In "A" pro at the ABA Winternationals in Chandler, Arizona on February 18, 1990.

First Senior Pro** race result: See "First Professional race result".

First Senior Pro win: In "A" pro at the NBL Easter Classic in Sarasota, Florida on day two of the national on April 15, 1990.

Retired: 2002

Height & weight at height of her career (1987–1997): Ht:5'11" Wt:180 lbs.

*In the NBL "B" Pro/Super Class/"A" Pro/Junior Elite Men depending on the era; in the ABA it is "A" Pro.
**In the NBL it is "AA" Pro/Elite Men; in the ABA it is "AA" Pro.

=== Career factory and major bike shop sponsors ===
Note: This listing only denotes the racer's primary sponsors. At any given time a racer could have numerous ever changing co-sponsors. Primary sponsorships can be verified by BMX press coverage and sponsor's advertisements at the time in question. When possible exact dates are given.

==== Amateur/Junior Men ====
- Monrovia Schwinn (bicycle shop): 1981–1983
- Bandito Racing Products: May 1983 – Late February 1984
- Cycle Pro/GHP (Greg Hill Products): Late February 1984 – Late December 1984
- Diamondback: Late December 1984 – Mid December 1985
- S&K Cycle Center: January 1986 – May 10, 1986
- Free Agent: May 11, 1986 – December 1987 Hadan was on S&K until May 10 and was picked up the next day by Free Agent which was Day 2 of the ABA Spring Nationals in Stockton, California.
- Diamondback: December 1987 – Early February 1991. Hadan will turn professional with this sponsor. Matt Hadan almost was let go along with the rest of the Diamondback racing team when it decided to drop its BMX racing program at the end of the 1989 season. Diamondback management wanted the BMX team to win a team title to justify its budget. When the team didn't win a title with either the NBL or ABA it decided to drop the entire team, including Hadan. Harry Leary, Diamondback team manager, apparently won his fight to keep Matt Hadan on as its sole racer.

==== Professional/Elite Men ====
- Diamondback: January 1988 – Early February 1991. Diamondback ends its BMX racing effort by dropping Hadan. Hadan would go without a major sponsor for approximately five months.
- Snap-On Tools: February 1991 – April 1991
- Aggro Tech: April 1991 – May 1991
- Super Tech: May 1991 – Early June 1991.
- U.S. Boss Racing Products: Early June 1991 – December 1992
- Kastan Engineering: 1993–1994
- Balance: 1994 – December 1995
- Redline Bicycles: December 1995 – July 1996. Reportedly Hadan was dropped from the Redline team along with teammate Wade Bootes after Redline management got word that both were negotiating with Trek/Gary Fisher.
- Trek/Gary Fisher: July 1996 – December 1997
- Torker Bicycles February 1998 – Mid-September 2000
- Redline Bicycles Mid-September 2000 – December 31, 2001
- Capri: 2003

=== Career bicycle motocross titles ===
Note: Listed are District, State/Provincial/Department, Regional, National, and International titles in italics. "Defunct" refers to the fact of that sanctioning body in question no longer existing at the start of the racer's career or at that stage of his/her career. Depending on point totals of individual racers, winners of Grand Nationals do not necessarily win National titles.

==== Amateur/Junior Men ====
National Bicycle Association (NBA)

National Bicycle League (NBL)

- 1984 14 Expert & 14 Cruiser National No.1 (NAG)*
- 1985 15 Expert Grandnational Champion
- 1985 15 Expert & 15 Cruiser National No.1
- 1989 18 & Over Expert National No.1

*National Age Group

American Bicycle Association (ABA)

- 1983 13–14 Cruiser Grandnational Champion
- 1985 14 Expert and 14 Cruiser Winter Season California District 13 (CA-13) District Age Group (DAG) No.1*
- 1986 16 Expert & 16 Cruiser Canadian-American (Can-Am) Champion.
- 1986 16 Cruiser Grandnational Champion
- 1986 16 Expert National No.2 & 16 Cruiser National No.1
- 1988 17 & Over Expert Gold Cup West Champion
- 1988 Yamaha Future Pro Champion
- 1988 15 & Over Boys Yamaha East Vs. West Gold Cup Shootout Champion
- 1989 15 Expert National No.3

*DAG District Age Group, NAG-National Age Group
In 1985 the ABA experimented with dividing the district points season from one year lasting from January 1 to December 31 to three four-month-long time periods at which a racer could earn a plate number for that time period and/or their age group and could race the rest of the year with it. The experiment lasted only for a year before the ABA reverted to a single year long points gathering season in 1986.

United States Bicycle Motocross Association (USBA)

- None

Fédération Internationale Amateur de Cyclisme (FIAC)*

- None

International Bicycle Motocross Federation (IBMXF)*

- 1987 16–17 Cruiser World Champion.

Union Cycliste Internationale (UCI)*

*See Professional section.

Other titles:

- 1983 Jag 13 & Under Cruiser World Champion (Non Sanctioned)

==== Professional/Elite Men ====
National Bicycle Association (NBA)

- None (defunct)

National Bicycle League (NBL)

- None

American Bicycle Association (ABA)

- 2001 Pro Cruiser World Cup Champion

United States Bicycle Motocross Association (USBA)

- None (defunct)

Fédération Internationale Amateur de Cyclisme (FIAC)*

- None (FIAC did not have a strictly professional division during its existence).

International Bicycle Motocross Federation (IBMXF)*

- 1990 Pro Bronze Medal World Champion

Union Cycliste Internationale (UCI)*

- 1994 Superclass 20" Silver Medal World Champion

*Note: Beginning in 1991 the IBMXF and FIAC, the amateur cycling arm of the UCI, had been holding joint World Championship events as a transitional phase in merging which began in earnest in 1993. Beginning with the 1996 season the IBMXF and FIAC completed the merger and both ceased to exist as independent entities being integrated into the UCI. Beginning with the 1996 World Championships held in Brighton, England the UCI would officially hold and sanction BMX World Championships and with it inherited all precedents, records, streaks, etc. from both the IBMXF and FIAC.

Pro Series Championships

=== Notable accolades ===
- He became the first racer in ABA history to quadruple at a national, winning 12 Expert, 11–12 Open, 12 & Under Cruiser and 11–12 Trophy Dash at the ABA Spring Nationals on May 30, 1983. His birthday was only five days away, which at that time would have moved him up an age group and he would have faced presumably stiffer competition. He had also quadrupled at the Wheaties US Gold Cup Qualifier #2 in Tempe, Arizona on March 27, 1983. Greg Liggins did it twice in 1982 in triple point races, including the 1982 ABA Gold Cup Finals in late November 1982. He also accomplished this feat a few days prior to his birthday and being moved up an age group.
- Named the twelfth (12) of the 25 Hottest amateurs in BMX racing in a 1984 survey conducted by BMX Plus! for the opinions of four prominent figures in BMX: Two racers, Brent Patterson and Mike Poulson; and two team officials: Dr. Gary Scofield of GT, Howard Wharthon of Diamond Back.
- Named one of eight top amateurs deemed top "Pros of the Future" by Super BMX & Freestyle magazine, along with Billy Griggs, Eric Carter, Doug Davis, Mike King, Brent Romero, Darwin Griffin, and Brad Birdwell.
- Named one of BMX Action's "Terrible 10" Top Amateurs of 1988.
- Named 19th out of 21 racers deemed BMX's Hottest Amateurs in 1988 from a BMX Plus! poll of seven team managers which included Don Crupi of MCS, Mike Seevers of GT, Yvonne Shoup of Free Agent, Dave Custodero of Mongoose, Mike Donell of Revcore, Bill Nelson of Robinson, and Racer/Team Manager of Diamond Back Harry Leary.

=== Significant injuries ===
- Dislocated shoulder in first turn crash at the 1998 NBL Christmas Classic in Columbus, Ohio in late December 1998
- Bruised Kidney in crash at the 1998 ABA U.S. Nationals in Bakersfield, California. Missed a few races recuperating.

== BMX and general press magazine interviews and articles ==
- "#1 Matt Hadan on a cruiser" American BMXer November 1987 Vol.9 No.10 p. 22
- "New Kids on the Block" Go September 1990 Vol.1 Iss.11 p. 52 A joint interview article with fellow rookie pros Steve Veltman and Kenny May.
- "Young Guns!!!" BMX Plus! October 1990 Vol.13 No.10 p. 64 Joint interview with fellow rookie pros Eric Carter, Tim Hall, Steve Veltman, and Kenny May.
- "NBL National #1 Amateurs" BMX Plus! January 1990 Vol.13 No.1 p. 70 Brief interview with Hadan describing his effort to win the 18 & Over Expert NBL title. Included is a list of the National Age Group (NAG) No.1s in 1989.
- "matt hadan" Snap BMX Magazine November/December 1996 Vol.3 Iss.6 No.13 p. 34
- "Q&A: Have you ever cheated racing?" Snap BMX Magazine May 1999 Vol.6 Iss.3 No.31 p. 25 One of ten interviews of racers including Brian Foster and Dale Holmes asking if they ever cheated during a race.

== BMX magazine covers ==
Note: Only magazines that were in publication at the time of the racer's career(s) are listed unless specifically noted.

Minicycle/BMX Action & Super BMX:

- Super BMX & Freestyle March 1987 Vol.14 No.3 (5) behind Doug Davis (4). In inset freestyler Steve Klander

Bicycle Motocross Action & Go:

- May 1987 Vol.12 No.5 (BMXA)
- October 1990 Vo.1 Iss.12 (Go)

BMX Plus!:

- August 1989 Vol.12 No.8 in main image (obscured silver black/blue helmet) behind in foreground Eric Carter (Schwinn) with Travis Chipres (Mongoose), Billy Griggs (Redline), GT's Mike Ellis and Haro's Mike King obscured in black/silver helmet with no."1". Also in top insert with aforementioned.

Total BMX:

Bicycles and Dirt (ABA Publication):

- None

Snap BMX Magazine & Transworld BMX:

- Smap September 1999 Vol.6 Iss.7 No35

Twenty BMX:

BMX World:

NBA World & NBmxA (The official NBA/NBmxA membership publication):

Bicycles Today & BMX Today (The official NBL membership publication with one name change.):

ABA Action, American BMXer, BMXer (The official ABA membership publication with two name changes):

- April 1986 Vol.8 No.3 (1) ahead of Robert MacPherson (3)

USBA Racer (The official USBA membership publication):
