= Darwin Griffin =

American cyclist (born 1969)

Personal information
- Full name: Darwin Griffin
- Born: February 24, 1969 (age 57) United States

Cycling career
- Sport: Cycling
- Current team: Retired
- Discipline: Bicycle Motocross (BMX)
- Role: Racer
- Rider type: Off Road

Darwin L. Griffin (born February 24, 1969, from Oxnard, California, US) is a former professional American mid-school Bicycle Motocross (BMX) racer whose prime competitive years were 1982–1989.

== Racing career ==
Note: Professional first are on the national level unless otherwise indicated.

Started racing: In 1980 when he was eleven years old living in Silver Lakes Community of Helendale, California, he and a youth group that included his brother Dana, helped the Lions Club build a Motocross Park. He saw an advertisement about a BMX race in a newspaper. He and his brother Dana won the first race they ever tried.

Sanctioning body: ()

First race result:

First race bike: a Moxey 4.

First win (local):

Home sanctioning body district(s): American Bicycle Association (ABA) District 20 (CA-20) (1985)

First sponsor:

First national win:

Turned professional: Late December 1988.

First professional race result: Second in "B" pro at the 1988 National Bicycle League (NBL) Christmas Classic (Day 1) in Columbus, Ohio on December 28, 1988 in his first race as pro.

First professional win: In Pro Award at the NBL Christmas Classic (Day 2) on December 29, 1988. He won $240, the equivalent to $417.31 in 2007. (Cost of living calculator)

First Junior Men Pro* race result: See "First Professional race result"

First Junior Men Pro win: In "A" pro at the American Bicycle Association (ABA) Winternationals in Chandler, Arizona on February 19, 1989 (Day 2) He won $870, the equivalent to $1,443.22 in 2007.

First Senior Men Pro** race result:

First Senior Men Pro win:

Retired: .

Height and weight at height of his career (1986–1988): Ht: 6'2" Wt: 205 lbs.

*In the NBL Junior Pro is "B" Pro/Superclass/"A" Pro depending on the era; in the ABA it is "A" Pro.
**In the NBL Senior Pro is "A" or Elite Pro; in the ABA it is "AA" Pro.

=== Career factory and major bike shop sponsors ===
Note: This listing only denotes the racer's primary sponsors. At any given time a racer could have numerous ever changing co-sponsors. Primary sponsorships can be verified by BMX press coverage and sponsor's advertisements at the time in question. When possible exact dates are used.

==== Amateur ====
- Wheels (bike shop):
- Oxnard Bike Shop:
- Normura:
- Pro Flo: 1983
- Mongoose (BMX Products): December 28, 1983 – April 8, 1984 Mongoose gave a factory support spot on their team to Griffin after being impressed by his performance at the ESPN Pro Spectacular finals the previous day.
- GT (Gary Turner) Racing: Mid April 1984-August 1984
- Blue Max (BMX Products): September 1984-August 27, 1985. Griffin left Blue Max over a contract dispute three days before the 1985 NBL Grand National. According BMX Action which cited a Blue Max spokesman, Griffin wrote a letter to BMX Products, the parent company of both Blue Max and Mongoose, stating large contingency payment demands for the 1985 NBL Grandnationals. According to BMX Plus!s report on the incident this spokesman was probably Team Manager Russ Okawa that BMX Action was referring to. He didn't give details but according to BMX Plus! sources the contingency payments were supposed to be $1,000 for every first-place finish and $5,000 for each National No.1 plate obtained. Again according to BMX Plus! when Skip Hess, the President of BMX Products heard of Griffin's demands he reportedly said "Drop him". Griffin was promptly fired.
- Raleigh Cycle Company of America: September 1, 1985-October 1985. Griffin was sponsored by Raleigh beginning of the last day of the 1985 NBL Grandnational.
- U.S. Boss: October 1985-December 1985
- Zeronine: January 25, 1986-July 1986 He was picked up on Day One of the ABA Supernationals. According to his brother and fellow racer Dana Griffin, Zeronine threatened to drop him from the team for refusing to go on tour because he wanted to stay close to a girl he just met. As a result, he didn't race the Murray World Cup race on June 27, 1986.
- Blue Max: November 1986-December 1986
- U.S. Boss: January 1987-March 27, 1988
- Revcore: April 8, 1988-Late June 1988. Griffin was picked up during the NBL Peachtree National in Peachtree, Georgia. Griffin's first race for Revore was the ABA U.S. Nationals in Bakersfield, California. It was according to BMX Action magazine, to fill the spot left by the departed Eric Carter Griffin left Revcore supposedly due to a contract dispute. However Darwin claims that it was because he married his longtime girlfriend:
  "They thought I couldn't ride once I got married-just started getting into my personal life. So I decided to take myself off."
- U.S. Boss: July 2–5, 1988. According to Griffin pro racer Cecil Johns lobbied Carlo Lucia, the owner of U.S. Boss, to have Griffin back on the team despite Carlo promising that he would never have him back. Apparently the efforts of Johns paid off and Griffin was back on the team. However, after not liking starting at the bottom of the pecking order of the team he decided to leave Boss after four days after starting secret negotiations with White Bear.
  "Everyone had their place on the team. I was starting back at the bottom.".
  Another story of as to why he left revcore was according to the November 1988 issue of Super BMX & Freestyle that he was fired from either Revcore or US Boss for forgetting to renew his ABA membership, thus losing all the points accumulated up until that time, making it highly unlikely for him to defend his 1987 ABA National Cruiser No. 1 title. Darwin's failure to renew his license is a mistake similar to that Ronnie Anderson made in 1983 when he neglected to renew his ABA license and forfeited all his points up until that time. He was on White Bear by the time of the 1988 Midwest Nationals on July 16–17, 1988.
- White Bear BMX Racing Products: July 5, 1988-May 1989 He began secret negotiations with White Bear's representative Lonnie Means the last day he was on Boss, with a contract package which included Griffin getting his own signature frame and fork. He turned pro while on this team.

==== Professional ====
- White Bear BMX Racing Products: July 5, 1988-May 1989
- BADD & Co. January 1992-
- Herda/Hawk: 1995

Retired

- O'Neal: 2000

=== Career bicycle motocross titles ===
Note: Listed are District, State/Provincial/Department, Regional, National, and International titles in italics. "Defunct" refers to the fact of that sanctioning body in question no longer existing at the start of the racer's career or at that stage of his/her career. Depending on point totals of individual racers, winners of Grand Nationals do not necessarily win National titles. Series and one off Championships are also listed in block.

==== Amateur ====
National Bicycle Association (NBA)

National Bicycle League (NBL)

- 1984 15 Cruiser Grandnational Champion
- 1985 16 Cruiser Murray World IV Cup Champion
- 1985 16 Cruiser Grandnational Champion
- 1985 16 Cruiser National No.2
- 1985 16 Expert National No.3
- 1987 18-24 Cruiser Vision World Cup Champion

American Bicycle Association (ABA)

- 1984 15 Expert & 15-16 Cruiser U.S. Gold Cup Champion
- 1985 16 Expert Winter Season California District 20 (CA-20) District Age Group (DAG) No.1
- 1987 17-21 Cruiser Grandnational Champion
- 1987 National No.1 Cruiser
- 1988 17 Expert and 17 & Over Open Grandnational Champion

United States Bicycle Motocross Association (USBA)

- 1984 15 Expert 7-UP World Championship Champion

Fédération Internationale Amateur de Cyclisme (FIAC)*

International Bicycle Motocross Federation (IBMXF)*

- 1985 16 Boys Silver Medal World Champion
- 1985 16-17 Cruiser World Champion.

Union Cycliste Internationale (UCI)*

Independent Series and Invitationals

- 1983 14 Expert Jag World Championship Champion (non sanctioned)
- 1984 15 Expert and 14-15 Cruiser Larry Wilcox/Pepsi West Coast BMX Challenge Series Champion.

*See note in professional section

==== Professional ====
National Bicycle Association (NBA)

- None (defunct)

National Bicycle League (NBL)

- None

American Bicycle Association (ABA)

United States Bicycle Motocross Association (USBA)

- None (Defunct)

International Bicycle Motocross Federation (IBMXF)*

- None

Fédération Internationale Amateur de Cyclisme (FIAC)*

- None (FIAC did not have a strictly professional division during its existence) (defunct).

Union Cycliste Internationale (UCI)*

*Note: Beginning in 1991 the IBMXF and FIAC had been holding joint World Championship events as a transitional phase in merging which began in earnest in 1993. Beginning with the 1996 season the IBMXF and FIAC completed the merger and both ceased to exist as independent entities being integrated into the UCI. Beginning with the 1997 World Championships held in Brighton, England the UCI would officially hold and sanction BMX World Championships and with it inherited all precedents, records, streaks, etc. from both the IBMXF and FIAC.

Pro Series Championships

=== Notable accolades ===
- Named one of the "Terrible Ten" amateurs for 1986 by "BMX Action" magazine.
- Named one of eight top amateurs deemed top "Pros of the Future" by Super BMX & Freestyle magazine along with Billy Griggs, Eric Carter, Doug Davis, Mike King Brent Romero, Matt Hadan and Brad Birdwell.
- Named number six of the 1987 "Terrible Ten" Top ten amateurs and future professionals by BMX Action magazine.
- Named one of the 1988 "Terrible Ten" top ten amateurs and future professionals by BMX Action magazine"
- Named 11th out of 21 racers deemed BMX's Hottest Amateurs in 1988 from a BMX Plus! poll of seven team managers which included Don Crupi of MCS, Mike Seevers of GT, Yvonne Shoup of Free Agent, Dave Custodero of Mongoose, Mike Donell of Revcore, Bill Nelson of Robinson and Racer/Team Manager of Diamond Back Harry Leary.

=== BMX product lines ===
- 1988 White Bear Darwin Griffin "Shredder" frame and fork set

product evaluation

== BMX press magazine interviews and articles ==
- "Sharpshootin': Darwin Griffin" BMX Action April 1984 Vol.9 No.4 pg.72
- "#1 Cruiser Darwin Griffin".American BMXer April 1988 Vol.10 No.3 pg.20
- "The Champs" BMX Plus! April 1988 Vol.11 No.4 pg.70 Griffin is the subject of one of six articles of the ABA National No.1s for 1987 including Eric Rupe, Charles Townsend, Mike King, Nikki Murray and Leigh Donovan.
- "On The Cover...darwin griffin" BMX Action November 1988 Vol.13 No.11 pg.63

== BMX magazine covers ==
Note: (defunct) denotes that the magazine was out of business before the career of the racer started.

Bicycle Motocross News:

- None

Minicycle/BMX Action & Super BMX:

- None

Bicycle Motocross Action and Go:

- BMX Action November 1988 Vol.13 No.11

BMX Plus!:

Total BMX:

- None

Bicycles and Dirt:

- None

Ride BMX Magazine:

Snap BMX Magazine and Transworld BMX:

BMX World:

Moto Mag:

NBA World and NBmxA World (The official NBA/NBmxA membership publication under two different names):

Bicycles Today and BMX Today (The official NBL membership publication under two different names):

ABA Action, American BMXer, BMXer (The official ABA membership publication under three different names):

- American BMXer September 1987 Vol.9 No.8
- American BMXer April 1988 Vol.10 No.3

USBA Racer (The official USBA membership publication):
