= Steve Veltman =

American BMX racer (born 1969)

Personal information
- Full name: Stephen James Veltman
- Nicknames: "Spider-Man", "V"-Dog", "Primetime"
- Born: August 4, 1969 (age 57) Philadelphia, Pennsylvania, U.S.
- Height: 1.83 m (6 ft 0 in)
- Weight: ~93 kg (205 lb)

Cycling career
- Sport: Cycling
- Current team: Retired
- Discipline: Bicycle Motocross (BMX)
- Role: Racer
- Rider type: Off Road

Amateur teams
- 1980: World of Wheels
- 1980: Mongoose (co factory)
- 1981: Bassett
- 1981-1986: Hutch Hi-Performance BMX/Products
- 1987-1988: McDonald's
- 1988-1989: U.S. Boss Racing Products

Professional teams
- 1990: U.S. Boss Racing Products
- 1990-1991: L&S Racing
- 1991-1992: Vans
- 1992: ODI
- 1992-1995: U.S. Boss Racing Products
- 1997-1998: Torker
- 1998-1999: Next
- 1999-2001: Magna
- 2003: ODI
- 2003: Answer Products
- 2004: GT Bicycles

Stephen James Veltman (born August 4, 1969 in Philadelphia, Pennsylvania; later raised in Conroe, Texas U.S.) is a former American "Old School/Mid School" professional Bicycle Motocross (BMX) racer whose prime competitive years were from 1980–1985 and 1987 to 1998. His nickname during the time he first achieved fame as a 12- and 13-year-old was "Spider-Man" due to the posture he had as he speed jumped his bicycle over moguls. He would be tucked all the way back over and just above the rear wheel. His right elbow would be down while his left up as opposed to having them near perfectly level. This along with his red and white Hutch uniform and helmet with mirrored lensed goggles gave an impression of the comic book superhero Spider-Man swinging on his web. His later moniker "V"-Dog" came into being concurrently with him joining the Vans Racing Team in April 1991. He was also known as "Primetime".

== Racing career ==
Note: Professional firsts are on the national level unless otherwise indicated.

Milestone	Event details
Started racing:	At age 10 in early 1980 at the Armadillo Downs track in Conroe, Texas. His friends were racing so he saved up by mowing lawns and washed cars to get his first BMX bicycle, a Raleigh Rampar. Previously he played soccer from 4 1/2 to 10 years old but felt that being on a team sport didn't let him shine to his maximum potential. After racing his first race he switched sports permanently. Later in his career he took a hiatus from the sport. Similar to what Brian Patterson did during the 1979 and part of the 1980 season, Veltman took a year off from BMX after the 1985 season. He resumed local racing in early 1987. His first national back was the ABA Big "T" Nationals in Fort Worth, Texas, winning 17 & Over Open on May 9, 1987 and 17 & over Expert on May 10, 1987.
Sanctioning body:	
First race bike:	Raleigh Rampar.
First race result:	Third place in 10 novice.
Home sanctioning body district(s):	National Bicycle Association (NBA) District "T" (Texas) 1980-1981; American Bicycle Association (ABA) Texas 3 (TX-3) 1980–1989
First win (local):	
First sponsor:	World of Wheels in 1980
First national race result:	Did not make main in the 1980 American Bicycle Association (ABA) Gnarler (Fall) Nationals in Anaheim, California.
First national win:	In 12 Expert at the ABA Ohio State Fair National on June 28, 1981.
Turned professional:	January 1990 at 20 years of age.
First professional race result:	Eighth place (last) in "A" pro at the ABA Silver Dollar Nationals (Day 1) on January 13, 1990 in Reno, Nevada. He won $60, the equivalent of US$94.43 in 2007 (Cost of Living Calculator).
First professional win:	In Pro Open at the 1990 ABA Silver Dollar Nationals (Day 1) on January 13, 1990. He won US$460. or USD 723.96 in 2007.
First Junior Men/Pro* race result:	See First professional race result.
First Junior Men/Pro win:	In "A" Pro at the 1990 ABA Silver Dollar Nationals (Day 2) on January 14, 1990. He won USD 525. or USD 826.26 in 2007.
First Senior Pro** race result:	First place in "A" Pro at the National Bicycle League (NBL) "Round 4: Duel in the Desert" national in Las Vegas, Nevada, on February 10, 1990.
First Senior Pro win:	See above.
Height and weight at height of his career:	Ht: 6'0" Wt: 208 lbs.
Retired:	2004. However, after a two-year layoff he raced Vet pro at the ABA Grand National in the Race of Champions pre-race On November 25, 2006, and came in third.

*In the NBL "B" Pro/Super Class/"A" pro (depending on the era); in the ABA "A" pro.
**In the NBL "A" Pro/All Pros/Pro Class/"AA" Pro/"Elite Men"; in the ABA "AA" pro.

=== Career factory and major bike shop sponsors ===
Note: This listing only denotes the racer's primary sponsors. At any given time, a racer could have numerous co-sponsors. Primary sponsorships can be verified by BMX press coverage and sponsors' advertisements at the time in question. When possible, exact dates are given.

==== Amateur ====
- World of Wheels (bike shop): 1980
- Mongoose (BMX Products) (co-factory): 1980
- Bassett: Early 1981 – November 1981
- Hutch Hi-Performance BMX/Products: November 27, 1981 – mid-1986. Richard Hutchins, the owner of Hutch Hi-Performance, first saw Steve (after Steve's father Jim Veltman pointed him out) at a 1981 ABA National in Ohio. He won his class. Hutchins next saw him at the 1981 ABA Grand National pre-race. He showed enough talent to give him a uniform to wear at the Grand Nationals proper the next two days. After Steve placed fourth in 12 Expert, he gave him a formal and full sponsorship immediately afterward. Veltman's first race for Hutch was the ABA Winter Shootout Triple pointer in Jersey City, New Jersey, on December 13, 1981. Veltman took a year hiatus from the National BMX racing circuit starting in mid-1986 (sometime after the Murray World Cup) due to burnout, lacking the will to win and craving the desire to do other things. He returned in mid-1987 after that desire to complete returned.
- McDonald's: Mid-1987 – late October 1988. McDonald's, like its competitor Hardee's, fielded a BMX team but the McDonald's team lasted two years compared to the one the Hardee's team lasted. McDonald's shut down its BMX effort in October 1988.
- U.S. Boss Racing Products: Late October 1988 – December 1989. Veltman turned pro with this sponsor.

==== Professional ====
- U.S. Boss Racing Products: Late October 1988 – December 1989. Shortly after McDonald's discontinued its BMX effort, Veltman joined U.S. Boss. The ABA Fall Nationals on October 29 in Orlando, Florida, was the first race with his new sponsor.
- L&S (Lucia & Son) Racing: January 1990 – April 1991. L&S was started by the same person who previously owned U.S. Boss Racing Products, Carlo Lucia.
- Vans (Van Doran Rubber Company): April 1991-March 1992. Veltman started a brief retirement to concentrate on school.
- ODI (Ornate Design, Inc*): November 26, 1992 – November 29, 1992. He showed up at the 1992 ABA Grandnationals in an ODI jersey. It was his first race since his approximately eight-month hiatus to concentrate on school. This sponsorship lasted the duration of the 1992 ABA Grandnationals.
- U.S. Boss Racing Products: November 29, 1992 – December 1995. Veltman during the 1995 season went into a brief retirement. He returned to the racing circuit at the beginning of 1996.
- Torker: January 1996-January 1998
- Next: Late August 1998 – late November 1999
- Magna: Late November 1999 – 2001
- ODI: 2003 This company started out making Christmas ornaments but switched to making bicycle grips and later grips for power tools as well as BMX and skateboarding accessories.
- Answer Products: 2003
- GT (Gary Turner) Bicycles: 2004

=== Career bicycle motocross titles ===
Note: Listed are District, State/Provincial/Department, regional, national, and international titles in italics. "Defunct" refers to the fact of that sanctioning body in question no longer existing at the start of the racer's career or at that stage of his or her career. Depending on point totals of individual racers, winners of Grand Nationals do not necessarily win National titles. Series and one off Championships are also listed in block.

==== Amateur ====
National Bicycle Association (NBA)

- None

National Bicycle League (NBL)

- None

American Bicycle Association (ABA)

- 1980 Texas State Champion
- 1981 Texas District 3 (TX-3) No.1
- 1982 12 Expert North Central Gold Cup Champion
- 1982 13 Expert Grandnational Champion
- 1982 National No. 1 Amateur
- 1982 National No. 1 Cruiser
- 1982 13 Expert Jag World Champion (ABA sanctioned)
- 1983 14 Expert and 13-13 Cruiser International Super Bowl of BMX Champion.*
- 1985 15 Expert and 15 Cruiser Winter Season TX-3 District Age Group (DAG) No.1**

*The ABA International Superbowl of BMX was a series of 33 qualifying races around the country culminating in a Championship race in Toledo, Ohio. To qualify, a racer had to participate in one of the 33 races in the series. Then the qualifiers participate in three double-point races in Ohio a day before the finals. The main event qualifiers will then be trimmed down to the sixteen riders with the most points via tabulation. Those 16 will make up the semis for the triple-point Superbowl race event itself with the qualifiers from those semis racing for the title in the main. Each Superbowl main amateur or pro was run three times to determine the champion in his or her class.

**DAG District Age Group, NAG-National Age Group
In 1985 the ABA experimented with dividing the district points season from one year lasting from January 1 to December 31 to three four-month-long periods at which a racer could earn a plate number for that time period and/or their age group and could race the rest of the year with it. The experiment lasted only for a year before the ABA reverted to a single year long points gathering season in 1986. United States Bicycle Motocross Association (USBA)

- 1985 16 Cruiser Grandnational Champion

International Bicycle Motocross Federation (IBMXF)

- 1982 12 Expert World Champion
- 1982 13 & Under Cruiser World Champion
- 1989 18 to 24 Cruiser World Champion.

Other titles

- 1981 12 Expert Jag World Champion (USCF sanctioned)

==== Professional ====
National Bicycle Association (NBA)

- None

National Bicycle League (NBL)

- 1991 20" Pro Grandnational Champion

American Bicycle Association (ABA)

- 1990 Pro U.S Gold Cup West Champion
- 1990 Pro Super Cup Champion
- 1993 National No.1 Pro. He won a black 1993 Ford Ranger

United States Bicycle Motocross Association (USBA)

- None

International Bicycle Motocross Federation (IBMXF)

- None

Pro Series Championships

=== Notable accolades ===
- He was the first ABA racer, amateur or professional, to take two ABA No. 1 national titles in the same year: 1982 in Amateur 20" and Amateur Cruiser Class.
- He displayed something of an entrepreneurial spirit at a young age (13 years old at the time) by manufacturing and marketing "Rad Kaps", dice cubes converted into bicycle tire valve caps which sold briskly.
- He also displayed innovation as the inventor of the Posi-Stop brake cable guide. The Posi-Stop was a combination seat clamp and caliper brake cable guide that was supposed to improve the performance of such brakes. It was later manufactured and sold by Oddessey under the "Pozi-Stop" (note adjusted spelling) name.
- He became part of the venerable Wheaties advertising campaign on August 14, 1983, by being featured on the box of their cereal product, joining a long line of sports legends such as Lou Gehrig, Babe Ruth, Babe Didrikson, Jackie Robinson, Wilt Chamberlain and Caitlyn Jenner (then Bruce). (Note: Jenner changed her name due to gender transition in 2015.)
- He was named the fourteenth of the 25 hottest amateurs in BMX racing in a 1984 survey conducted by BMX Plus! for the opinions of four prominent figures in BMX: Two racers, Brent Patterson and Mike Poulson; and two team officials: Dr. Gary Scofield of GT, Howard Wharthon of Diamond Back.
- Named one of BMX Action's "Terrible Ten" of top amateurs and future pros for 1988
- Name by the ABA's BMXer magazine as the 1993 Golden Crank "Pro of the Year" Award.
- Named 1994 "Racer of the Year" by BMX Plus!. No voter break down given.
- He set and held the record for most pro wins in a season in the ABA at 14 in 1993 until John Purse broke it in 1998.
- In 1996, he set and held the World Bunny Hop record at 46 inches, overtaking fellow racer Brian Lopes's record. The Bunny Hop is basically a high jump on a bicycle. Like in a Track and field high jump a take-off ramp is not used and elevation is accomplished purely by muscle power and momentum. A jump is attempted either with either a rolling launch or at a near standstill. The front end of the bicycle is pulled up as one jumps up on the pedals. When the body is fully erect as if standing the handle bars of the pulled up front end is at waste level. At this juncture the rider pulls up on the bar further as his momentum is still going up. A moment later the rider pushes forward on the bars and brings his legs up to the point that his thighs are parallel to the ground. If done properly the rear wheel of the bicycle should come up with his legs and he should end up in a fully tucked position as if going over a speed jump, but in mid air; in Veltman's case 46 inches in mid-air. The whole exercise only last about a second and a half.

*Due to a change of ownership of BMX Plus! in 1983, no May issue was published that year.

=== Significant injuries ===
- Was laid up with mononucleosis for nearly two months after the 1988 ABA Grand Nationals. The 1989 ABA Winter Nationals held on February 18 and 19 in Chandler, Arizona was his first race back.
- Broke collarbone at the ABA Mid America Nationals in Lincoln, Nebraska, on March 1, 1992 (day 2). Laid up two months. This was the first significant BMX related injury he had ever had. Prior to this incident, he had never broken a bone racing.
- Was laid up for three months with severe back problems beginning in with his injury at the Silverdollar Nationals in Reno, Nevada on January 8 or 9, 1994. He tore tendons and tissue in his lower spine. His first race back was the ABA U.S. Nationals in Clovis, California on March 11, 1994.
- He separated his right wrist at the ABA Empire National in Kingston, New York on August 20, 1994. He crashed leading the first pro main on day 1, "endoing" (his front wheel hitting the front side of the jump incorrectly) on a set of triple moguls. He was laid up until just before the ABA Gold Cup East race in Blue Springs, Missouri on September 25, 1994. However, he would suffer another injury immediately.
- He suffered a snapped interior cruciate ligament with possible cartilage damage in his knee during a practice session two days before the ABA Gold Cup East race in Blue Springs, Missouri on September 23, 1994. He had to have surgery with a donor ligament to replace his snapped one. In total he was out with injuries for six consecutive months until the week of March 9, 1995, and returned to national competition for the ABA Winternationals in Scottsdale, Arizona, on March 18, 1995.

== Post BMX career ==
Steve Veltman is currently a Personal Trainer in the San Diego, California area. He still occasionally races BMX in ABA Veteran Pro class. He recently came in third place on Friday, November 24, 2006 during the ABA Grand National.

== BMX press magazine interviews and articles ==
- "Hutch's #1 Hero" ABA Action March 1982 Vol.6 No.3 pg.16
- "Steve Veltman: "V" is for Victory" Bicycle and Dirt March 1983 Vol.1 No.7 pg.41
- "Hutch's Steve Veltman: Interview with a National Champion"Super BMX May 1983 Vol.10 No.5 pg.56
- "Fast Talk: Steve Veltman" BMX Plus! May 1984 Vol.7 No.5 pg.71 Mini interview.
- "New Kids on the Block" Go September 1990 Vol.1 Iss.11 pg.52 A joint interview article with fellow rookie pros Kenny May and Matt Hadan.
- "Young Guns!!!" BMX Plus! October 1990 Vol.13 No.10 pg.64 Joint interview with fellow rookie pros Eric Carter, Tim Hall, Kenny May, and Matt Hadan.
- "Steve Veltman and the Art of Rolling" Go July 1991 Vol.2 Iss.9 pg.19 How to article on speed jumping.
- "Vans' Grand Slam! Taking a stand on BMX!" BMX Plus! April 1992 Vol.15 No.4 pg.35 Interviews with Steve Veltman and his teammates Terry Tenette, Pete Loncarevich and Racer/Team manager Everette Rosecrans.
- "totally mental: Steve Veltman: 1993 aba no.1 pro" American BMXer December 1994 Vol.16 Iss.11 pg.32
- "Steve Veltman" Snap BMX Magazine May/June 1997 Vol.4 No.3 Iss.16 pg.30

== BMX magazine covers ==
Bicycle Motocross News:

- None

Minicycle/BMX Action & Super BMX:

- None

Bicycle Motocross Action & Go:

- November 1990 Vol.2 Iss.1 ahead of Billy Griggs, Traves Chipres and Mike King. In insert John Paul Rogers (Go).

BMX Plus!:

- August 1990 Vol.13 No.8 behind Greg Hill & Brian Lopes
- October 1991 Vol.14 No.10 trailing Gary Ellis, Todd Corbitt & Pete Loncarevich.
- December 1993 Vol.16 No.12 behind Danny Nelson (51). In insert freestyler Dave Mirra.
- March 1994 Vol.17 No.3 Fourth from right on the starting gate with fellow pros (5) Brian Lopes (first from right), Mike King, Eric Carter (25), Pete Loncarevich (partly obscured on Veltman's right), & and unidentified. In top insert Haro Monocoque BMX racing bicycle.

Total BMX:

- March 1983. In insert Brian Patterson.

Bicycles and Dirt:

- March 1983 Vol.1 No.7 Inset: Gary Ellis and an unidentified racer.

Snap BMX Magazine & Transworld BMX:

Moto Mag:

- None

NBA World & NBmxA World (The official NBA/NBmxA membership publication):

- None

Bicycles Today & BMX Today (The official NBL publication under two names):

ABA Action, American BMXer, BMXer (The official ABA publication under three names):

- ABA Action November 1981 Vol.5 No.10
- ABA Action April 1983 Vol.6 No.3 standing with Brent Patterson, Robert Fehd, Debbie Kalsow and Greg Hill
- American BMXer December 1984 Vol.7 No.11
- American BMXer December 1994 Vol.16 Iss.11

USBA Racer (The official USBA membership publication:):"
