= Melanie Cline =

American bicycle motocross rider (born 1975)

Personal information
- Full name: Melanie R. Cline
- Nicknames: "Swell Mel", "Mel", "Speed Queen",
- Born: June 29, 1975 (age 51) Westland, Michigan, United States
- Height: 1.63 m (5 ft 4 in)
- Weight: 64 kg (141 lb)

Cycling career
- Sport: Cycling
- Current team: Moley Gosh
- Discipline: Bicycle Motocross (BMX)
- Role: Racer
- Rider type: Off Road

Amateur teams
- 1984–1985: Kam Marketing/Champion
- 1986: Reggie's Schwinn BMX
- 1986–1987: Hardee's
- 1987–1990: Cyclecraft
- 1990–1991: DK
- 1991: Revcore
- 1995: Cannondale
- 1995–1996: Ross

Professional teams
- 1996: Ross
- 1997: Profile

Melanie R. Cline (born June 29, 1975) is an American former amateur "Old/Mid School" Bicycle Motocross (BMX) racer whose prime competitive years were from 1982–2004 and 2009 to the present.

Born in Westland, Michigan, she was one of the first generation of female BMX racers to become well known after the 1980–1986 era dominated by Debbie Kalsow, Kathy Schachel, Gaby Bayhi and Cheri Elliott. Melanie Cline could more than hold her own against the boys, often racing in the "Open" class at nationals in which boys and girls raced in the same age bracket—9- and 10-year-olds and 11- and 12-year-olds for example—compete as opposed to the girls only division. She regularly made those Open mains and even won many of them. She won five such Opens at nationals in 1987 in the 11- and 12-year-old class. Her nicknames "Swell Mel" or just "Mel" are obvious plays on her first name Melanie. She was also known as "Speed Queen". Melanie went on to win 4 World Championships as well as 16 National Championships during her racing career, the most of any one person at that time. She stopped competing in 2003 after conceiving her first son shortly after the NBL Grand Nationals.

In late 2009, Melanie returned to racing with her five-year-old son joining her. She and her son have quickly become two riders to watch out for during the 2010 NBL season.

== Racing career milestones ==
Note: Professional first are on the national level unless otherwise indicated.

Milestone	Event Details
Started Racing:	July 4, 1982 at the Salt Creek BMX track in Winchester, Indiana. Age 7 years.
Sanctioning Body:	American Bicycle Association (ABA)
Sanctioning body district(s):	ABA Michigan District #1 (Mich-1) (1984)
First race bike:	
First race result:	First place at Salt Creek BMX
First win (local):	See above.
First sponsor:	Champion Racing Products
First national win:	She won the first seven nationals she entered.
Turned Professional:	1996. This was the first year that the NBL reintroduced professional woman's races into BMX since it originally ended in 1987.
First Professional race result:	
First Professional win:	
First Junior Women* race result:	N/A Junior Women was not a class during her career.
First Junior Women win:	N/A Junior Women was not a class during her career.
First Elite Women** race result:	
First Elite Women win:	
Height and weight at height of her career :	Ht: 5'4" Wt: 141 lbs (Size 4)
Retired:	

*In the UCI Junior women are ages 15 to 16 years of age, regardless if they are professional or not in another organization. Senior Women are from 17 years old and above, again regardless if they are professional or not in another sanctioning body.

=== Career factory and major bike shop sponsors ===
Note: This listing only denotes the racer's primary sponsors. At any given time a racer could have numerous ever changing co-sponsors. Primary sponsorships can be verified by BMX press coverage and sponsor's advertisements at the time in question. When possible exact dates are given.

==== Amateur/Junior Women ====
- Kam Marketing/Champion Racing Products: November 1983 – December 1985.
- Reggie's Schwinn BMX: January 1986-Late 1986
- Hardee's: Late October 1986 – December 1987
- Cyclecraft: December 1987 – 1990
- DK (Dad and Kids) Bicycle Company: 1990–1991
- Revcore: 1991 – November 1992
- Canondale: 1995
- Ross: 1995–1996. She would turn pro with this sponsor. The NBL reintroduced the girl's pro class in 1995.

==== Professional/Elite Women ====
- Ross: 1995–1996
- Profile: 1997

=== Career bicycle motocross titles ===
Note: Listed are District, State/Provincial/Department, Regional, National, and International titles in italics. Only sanctioning bodies that existed during the racer's career(s) are listed. Depending on point totals of individual racers, winners of Grand Nationals do not necessarily win National titles. Series and one off Championships are also listed in block.

==== Amateur/Junior Women ====
National Bicycle League (NBL)

- 1984 8–9 Girls Grandnational Champion
- 1984 8–9 Girls National No.1
- 1985 10 Girls Grandnational Champion
- 1985 10 Girls National No.1
- 1986 11 Girls Grandnational Champion
- 1986 11 Girls National No.1
- 1987 12 Girls Grandnational Champion
- 1987 12 Girls National No.1
- 1988 13 Girls Grandnational Champion
- 1988 13 Girls National No.1
- 1989 14 Girls Grandnational Champion
- 1989 14 Girls National No.1
- 1990 15 Girls Grandnational Champion
- 1990 15 Girls National No.1
- 1991 16 & Over Girls Grandnational Champion
- 1991 16 & Over Girls National No.1
- 1991 16 & Over Girls Cruiser Grandnational Champion.
- 2009 30–34 Women's Cruiser Grandnational Champion
- 2010 35–39 Women's Cruiser Grandnational Champion
- 2010 35–39 Women's Cruiser National No.1

American Bicycle Association (ABA)

- 1983 7–8 Girls Grandnational Champion
- 1984 Michigan District #1 (Mich-1) No.1 Girl
- 1985 10 Girls "Race of Champions" Champion
- 1985 10 Girls Grandnational Champion
- 1985 10 Girls National No.1*
- 1986 District Mich-1 No.1 Girl
- 1986 11 Girls "Race of Champions" Champion
- 1986 11 Girls Grandnational Champion
- 1988 13 Girls Grandnational Champion
- 1989 14 Girls Grandnational Champion

United States Bicycle Motocross Association (USBA)

- 1984 National No.3 Girl

*Beginning in the 1985 season the ABA made it possible to earn an amateur national no.1 plate in the age group of the racer, similar to NBL practice. However, the ABA still had an overall National No.1 Girl. Cheri Elliott was the overall National Girls No.1 for 1985.

International Bicycle Motocross Federation (IBMXF)*

- 1983 7 & Under Girls Murray World Cup II Champion
- 1985 9 Girls Murray World Cup IV Champion
- 1987 12 Girls World Champion

Fédération Internationale Amateur de Cyclisme (FIAC)*

- 1988 13 Girls World Champion
- 1989 14 Girls World Champion
- 1990 15 Girls World Champion

Union Cycliste Internationale (UCI)*

- None

*See note in professional section.

==== Professional/Elite Women ====
National Bicycle League (NBL)

- None

American Bicycle Association (ABA)

- None

United States Bicycle Motocross Association (USBA)

- None (Defunct)

International Bicycle Motocross Federation (IBMXF)*

- None (Defunct)

Fédération Internationale Amateur de Cyclisme (FIAC)*

- None

Union Cycliste Internationale (UCI)*

- 1995 Elite Women Bronze Medal World Cup Champion

*Note: Beginning in 1991 the IBMXF and FIAC, the amateur cycling arm of the UCI, had been holding joint World Championship events as a transitional phase in merging which began in earnest in 1993. Beginning with the 1996 season the IBMXF and FIAC completed the merger and both ceased to exist as independent entities being integrated into the UCI. Beginning with the 1996 World Championships held in Brighton, England the UCI would officially hold and sanction BMX World Championships and with it inherited all precedents, records, streaks, etc. from both the IBMXF and FIAC.

Pro Series Championships and Invitationals

=== Notable accolades ===
- She was instrumental in persuading the NBL to provide the girls a Cruiser class separate from the boys. Not that she wanted not to race the boys, but she wanted to retain female involvement in BMX racing. This is in keeping with her penchant to be pro active. She was on the drama club, active in all sports activities in school and carried a 3.8 Grade Point Average (GPA).

=== Significant injuries ===
- Broke finger in early 1984 just before the NBL national season at eight years old. she raced anyway despite having to wear a cast that reached up to her elbow for four weeks.

=== Miscellaneous ===
She has two sons, Ty Anthony Bialobrzeski, born on June 5, 2004, and Gage Kele Bialobrzeski, born on July 26, 2006.

== BMX press magazine interviews and articles ==
- "Mini Kids" Bicycles and Dirt September 1984 Vol.2 No.10 pg. 29. Very brief profile of her and 11 other 10 years old and under racers.
- "NBL National Number 1's" Bicycles Today January 1985 Vol.7 No.1 pg. 14 Short biographical blurb in sanctioning body newspaper for becoming NBL National No.1 8-9 Girls class in 1984.
- "5 World Champs: Who are these people, anyway?" BMX Plus! December 1988 Vol.11 No.12 pg.50 Small profile article along with four other 1988 FIAC World Champions.
- "Melanie Cline: Sponsored by Cycle Craft" BMX Plus! October 1990 Vol.13 No.10 pg.49 Mini interview.

== BMX magazine covers ==
Note: Only magazines that were in publication at the time of the racer's career(s) are listed unless specifically noted.

Minicycle/BMX Action & Super BMX:

- None

Bicycle Motocross Action & Go:

- None

BMX Plus!:

- None

Bicycles and Dirt:

- None

Snap BMX Magazine & Transworld BMX:

- None

Moto Mag:

- None

Bicycles Today & BMX Today (The official NBL membership publication under two names):

ABA Action, American BMXer, BMXer (The official ABA membership publication under three names):

USBA Racer (The official USBA membership publication):
