= Kenny May =

American bicycle motocross rider (born 1970)

Personal information
- Full name: Kenneth Henry May
- Nicknames: "May Day", "Mayhem"
- Born: April 5, 1970 (age 56) Sacramento, California, United States
- Height: 1.83 m (6 ft 0 in)
- Weight: 89.4 kg (197 lb)

Cycling career
- Sport: Cycling
- Current team: Retired
- Discipline: Bicycle Motocross (BMX)
- Role: Racer
- Rider type: Off Road

Amateur teams
- 1985: Boss Racing Products
- 1986–1987: Spinners
- 1987–1989: Free Agent
- 1989: Vision/Free Agent

Professional teams
- 1989–1992: Vision/Free Agent
- 1992: L&S Racing

Kenneth Henry May (born April 5, 1970 from Sacramento, California, U.S.) is a former American professional "Old/Mid School" Bicycle Motocross (BMX) racer whose prime competitive years were from 1985 to 2000.

His best known nickname is "May Day", a play on words involving his last name and the international call of distress Mayday which was in turn prompted by his hard charging "go-for-it" racing determined to come in first no matter what the cost. It often lead him to be carried off the race track in a stretcher. His being knocked out after a severe wreck (despite having a helmet on) during the 1986 American Bicycle Association (ABA) Grand Nationals being a case in point. He often managed to recover quickly enough to be in the next moto (heat) of racing to take the win and transfer to the main. Incidents like this also earned him the alternate nickname of "Mayhem", another play on his name and his predilection for wrecking on the race track and his aggressiveness toward other racers while racing and not.

== Racing career milestones ==
Note: Professional first are on the national level unless otherwise indicated.

Started racing: 1979 at approximately 10 years old at the Auburn DeWitt track. After racing for approximately two years he quit in 1983 after burnout. He returned to racing in 1985.

Sanctioning body:

First race result: Last place. He broke his hand in this race.

First win (local):

Home sanctioning body district(s): American Bicycle Association (ABA) CA-11 (1985)

First sponsor:

First national win:

Turned Professional: December 1, 1989 at 19 years of age.

First Professional race result: First place in "A" pro at the 1990 American Bicycle Association (ABA) in Reno, Nevada (Day 1) on January 13, 1990. He won US$525, the equivalent to US$826.26 in 2007 (Cost of Living Calculator) He also won Pro Cruiser winning US$250 (US$393.46 in 2007).

First Professional win: See above.

First Junior Pro* win: See above.

First Senior Pro** race result: Disqualified for the day for fighting with Alex Pflug (pronounced "Flewg") in the first moto after they collided in the third turn at the 1990 ABA Winter Nationals in Chandler, Arizona on February 18. He hit Pflug with a right hook to the head.

First Senior Pro win: In "AA" pro at the ABA Supernationals in El Paso, Texas on March 31, 1990.

Retired: Sometime in late 1992. He appeared to have just unceremoniously dropped out of racing during 1992.

Height & weight at height of his career (1988–1998): Ht:6'1" Wt:197 lbs.

*In the NBL it is B"/Superclass/"A" pro (beginning with 2000 season); in the ABA it is "A" pro.
**In the NBL it is "A" pro (Elite men); in the ABA it is "AA" pro.

=== Career factory and major bike shop sponsors ===
Note: This listing only denotes the racer's primary sponsors. At any given time a racer could have numerous ever changing co-sponsors. Primary sponsorships can be verified by BMX press coverage and sponsor's advertisements at the time in question. When possible, exact dates are given.

==== Amateur ====
- Boss Racing Products: 1985
- Spinners (bicycle shop): 1986-Late February 1987.
- Free Agent: Late February 1987 – November 1989.
- Vision/Free Agent: November 1989-Late 1992 Starting in November 1989 Vision Street Wear, a casual apparel maker and Free Agent shared sponsorship of the team, similar to Vans/MCS joint venture. Kenny May turned pro with this sponsor.

==== Professional ====
- Vision/Free Agent: November 1989 – 1992.
- L&S (Lucia & Son) Racing: 1992. L&S was started by the same person who previously owned U.S. Boss Racing Products, Carlo Lucia. He retired sometime in late in the season.

=== Career bicycle motocross titles ===
Note: Listed are District, State/Provincial/Department, Regional, National, and International titles in italics. "Defunct" refers to the fact of that sanctioning body in question no longer existing at the start of the racer's career or at that stage of his/her career. Depending on point totals of individual racers, winners of Grand Nationals do not necessarily win National titles. Series and one off Championships are also listed in block.

==== Amateur ====
National Bicycle Association (NBA)

- None

National Bicycle League (NBL)

- 1987 16 Cruiser Grandnational Champion
- 1988 17 Expert National No.1
- 1989 18 & Over Expert and 18–20 Cruiser Grandnational Champion

American Bicycle Association (ABA)

- 1985 14 Expert Winter Season California 11 CA-1 District Age Group (DAG) No.1
- 1986 CA-11 District No.1
- 1986 15 Cruiser Canadian-American (CAN-AM) Champion
- 1987 16 Expert U.S. Gold Cup West Champion.
- 1987 16 Expert and 16 Cruiser Grandnational Champion
- 1987 National 16 Expert No.1 (NAG)†
- 1989 17–21 Cruiser Grandnational Champion
- 1988 National No.1 Amateur and No.1 Cruiser He also won a Honda Reflex Motocross Motorcycle for each title.
- 1989 17 & Over Expert U.S. Gold Cup West Champion
- 1989 17 & Over Expert Honda East Vs. West Shootout "Future Pro" Champion.
- 1989 17 & Over Expert Grandnational Champion
- 1989 17 & Over Expert National No.1 (NAG)
- 1989 17–21 Cruiser National No.3

United States Bicycle Motocross Association (USBA)

- None

†NAG=National Age Group
International Bicycle Motocross Federation (IBMXF)

- 1989 Superclass 24" (Cruiser) World Champion*
*He won this title after he protested that the racer who had crossed the line first in a close main event race, Bas De Bever, had interfered with him unfairly when the two got entangled with each other but stayed up to finish one and two. The IBMXF track officials sided with Kenny May and awarded him first place, much to the Brisbane, Australia audience's displeasure, who made it known to May for the rest of the event in the form of booing, cursing and hissing lavishly."

==== Professional ====
National Bicycle Association (NBA)

- None (defunct)

National Bicycle League (NBL)

- 1990 National No.1 Pro Cruiser
- 1990 National No.3 in All Pro, National No.2 Super Cruiser

American Bicycle Association (ABA)

- 1990 "AA" Pro U.S. Gold Cup East Champion
- 1990, 1991 National No. 1 Pro Cruiser
- 1990 "Pros in Paradise" Champion*

United States Bicycle Motocross Association (USBA)

- None (defunct)

*The Pros in Paradise was a championship series by the ABA that awarded the winner of the series a week vacation in Hawaii and cash in the form of a direct award of US$500 spending money. Also, the ABA purchased back the points the racer earned during the season up to the finals at a rate of $5 for each of the 116 points the eventual winner, Kenny May accumulated, which tabulated to US$580. In total May won US$1080.

United States Bicycle Motocross Association (USBA)

- None

International Bicycle Motocross Federation (IBMXF)

Independent Pro Series Championships and Invitationals

=== Notable accolades ===
- Named one of BMX Action's "Terrible Ten" of top amateurs and future pros of 1988.
- Named fourth out of 21 racers deemed BMX's Hottest Amateurs in 1988 from a BMX Plus! poll of seven team managers which included Don Crupi of MCS, Mike Seevers of GT, Yvonne Shoup of Free Agent, Dave Custodero of Mongoose, Mike Donell of Revcore, Bill Nelson of Robinson and Racer/Team Manager of Diamond Back Harry Leary.

=== Significant injuries ===
- Broke hand in his very first race in 1979

=== Racing habits and traits ===
May had a "go for broke" racing style that often would result in him wrecking on the track and resulting in his injury. Indeed, he broke his hand in his very first race in 1979 He acknowledged his predilections for on track mishaps in an interview:

Gork: "What's with you and crashing?"
Kenny: "I dunno. When I crash, I crash HARD! I give it all. I ride 125 percent. And if I'm going down, I'm going to go down giving it 125 percent."

-----American BMXer May 1990

His aggressiveness also had a penchant to be displayed very graphically on his face:

"Kenny May is pretty hardcore. His quickness is attributed more to his determination and aggressiveness than it is his riding style. This can easily be identified by his facial expressions during a race—gritting teeth, wide eyed, loud huffing, snot spouting from his nose, saliva drooling out of the corner of his mouth, etc." ----BMX Action June 1988

Kenny May was possibly the most arressive racer towards other competetores BMX had since the days of "Crazy" Ronnie Anderson in the mid-1980s. In Ronnie Anderson fashion, he liked to "trash talk" the competition to get a psychological advantage. Sometimes this "trash talk" would provoke a physical altercation with another racer as it did with Joe Pinkney at the 1988 NBL Tanglewood Spring Nationals in Clemmons, North Carolina. It resulted in Pinkney having a dislocated shoulder.

On November 29, 1989 during the ABA Grandnationals in Oklahoma City, Oklahoma in a heavily contested race for the title of No.1 Amateur Cruiser that year, Kenny May had to be restrained by security guards to keep him from assaulting James Prichard (of whom he had several previous disputes with). In this case he thought made an overly aggressive pass during his 17–21 Cruiser main in the second turn while Kenny was leading. Kenny went down in the turn, costing him any chance of the 1989 amateur Cruiser title. As the guards and Yvonne Shoup restrained "a snorting mad" May, Prichard's family retreated to other environs after Prichard's last race.

As noted in the "First Senior Pro Race result" category above Kenny May was disqualified for fighting with another racer, Alex Pflug (pronounced "Puf-lug") They collided in the third turn in the first moto at the 1990 ABA Winter Nationals in Chandler, Arizona on February 18. In on report, he hit Pflug with a right hook to the head in response. May was disqualified for the day. May was asked and gave his side about the incident in a brief interview with Go magazine:

"We were coming out of the first corner and I was in third and Alex was in fourth and he pulled up next to me. I slipped my pedal coming off the drop-off. Then going into the second corner, just before the doubles he shoved me off the track and I missed the doubles. I was still in third, beating him into the third turn, and he came up on the inside and deliberately took me over the berm. THEN, he pushed me before I had even said anything to him, so I slapped him in the helmet and go 'What are you doin' dude? That ain't racing'. And I get DQ'ed for the day. I tell you, it's politics. They (the ABA) don't want me to get #1 this year." (1990) ----From Go June 1990.

Kenny May did not believe in turning the other cheek in competition. As he puts it he believes in "Payback":

"....I still won't deliberately take him out to pass him" [if the opponent was in the lead -ed] "--unless he's someone who's taken me out before. I'm into paybacks. Say that someone bumps me and I'm going to go down; I only feel it right that he goes down with me. It's simple." ---"Down 'N' Dirty" article March 1990 BMX Plus! article.

=== Miscellaneous ===
- Kenny May quintupled at the ABA Great Northwest Nationals in Vancouver, British Columbia, Canada on March 13, 1988 (Day 2). He won 16 Expert, 15 & Over Open; 16 Cruiser, 15 & Over Cruiser Trophy Dash, and 15 & Over Trophy Dash.

== BMX press magazine interviews and articles ==
- "Inside Free Agent: ABA's #1 Team" BMX Plus! March 1989 Vol.12 No.3 pg.51 Part of a profile about the Free Agent racing team.
- "Kenny May: Natl.#1 Amateur & Cruiser" American BMXer August 1989 Vol.11 No.7 pg.18
- Gold Cup West mini interview. American BMXer November 1989 Vol.11 No.10 pg.15 Very brief interview taken after his win.
- "Down'N'Dirty: The pros lead the way!" BMX Plus! March 1990 Vol.13 No.3 pg.67 Article within a series of answers by pros as to how they would deliberately interfere with competitors while racing without being called for fouls and disqualified by track officials or even the other competitors being aware.
- "Rookie Pro Kenny May is on his way..." American BMXer May 1990 Vol.12 No.4 pg.44
- "New Kids on the Block" Go September 1990 Vol.1 Iss.11 pg.52 A joint interview article with fellow rookie pros Steve Veltman and Matt Hadan.
- "Young Guns!!!" BMX Plus! October 1990 Vol.13 No.10 pg.64 Joint interview with fellow rookie pros Eric Carter, Tim Hall, Steve Veltman, and Matt Hadan.
- "Just Crusin'" BMX Plus! August 1991 Vol.14 No.8 pg.22 Part of a double interview (but not joint) alongside fellow racer D D. Leone.

== BMX magazine covers ==
Note: Only magazines that were in publication at the time of the racer's career(s) are listed unless specifically noted.

Minicycle/BMX Action & Super BMX:

- None

Bicycle Motocross Action & Go:

BMX Plus!:

Total BMX:

- None

Bicycles and Dirt:

- None

NBA World & NBmxA (The official NBA/NBmxA publication):

Bicycles Today & BMX Today (The official NBL membership publication under two names):

ABA Action, American BMXer, BMXer (The official ABA membership publication under three names):

- American BMXer August 1989 Vol.11 No.7

USBA Racer (The official USBA membership publication):
