= Eric Carter (BMX rider) =

American BMX bicycle rider (born 1970)

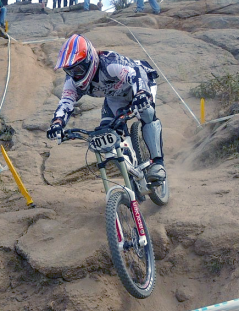

Personal information
- Full name: Eric Robert Carter
- Nicknames: "The Golden Child," "Earthquake"
- Born: March 6, 1970 (age 56) Long Beach, California, U.S.
- Height: 5 ft 10 in (178 cm)
- Weight: 175 lb (79 kg)

Cycling career
- Sport: Cycling
- Current team: GT
- Disciplines: Bicycle motocross (BMX); Mountain bike racing (MTB)
- Role: Biker
- Rider type: MTB: Dual slalom, Four-cross, Downhill

Amateur teams
- 1982: JMC Racing
- 1983–1984: VDC
- 1985: Free Agent
- 1985–1987: Hutch
- 1987: Bicycle Center
- 1987: CW Racing
- 1988: Revcore
- 1988–1989: Schwinn

Professional teams
- 1989: Schwinn
- 1990: MRC
- 1990: Titan Inc.
- 1990–1992: Brackens Racing
- 1992–1995: Hyper Designs (BMX)
- 1994-1995: Barracuda (MTB)
- 1996: Troy Lee Designs
- 1997: Rotec/White Bros
- 1997-2000: GT Bicycles
- 2001-Present: Mongoose/Hyundai
Medal record
Representing United States
Men's mountain bike racing
World Championships
Gold medal – first place	2004 Les Gets	Four-cross
Silver medal – second place	2003 Lugano	Four-cross
Bronze medal – third place	1999 Åre	Downhill
Bronze medal – third place	2002 Kaprun	Four-cross

Eric Robert Carter (born March 6, 1970), is a former American professional "Old/Mid School" Bicycle Motocross (BMX) racer whose prime competitive years were from 1983 to 1998. He had the nickname "The Golden Child," and later in his BMX career, acquired the moniker "The Earthquake." More recently, he has been known simply as "EC." Beginning in 1996, he converted fully to mountain bike racing (MTB) and has become one of the most respected racers in that discipline of bicycle racing.

== BMX racing career milestones ==
Note: Professional firsts are on the national level unless otherwise indicated.

Milestone	Event Details
Started racing:	1978 at age 8. He went out to see his friend Brent Fay (who was also on his soccer team) to race. Fay's father was the track operator and set Eric up to race.
Sanctioning body:	Bicycle Motocross League (BMXL).
Home sanctioning body districts:	American Bicycle Association (ABA) California 22 (CA-22) (1985); United States Bicycle Motocross Association (USBA) California 3 (CA-3) (1986)
First race bike:	
First race result:	
First win (local):	
First sponsor:	
First national win:	At the 1985 ABA Silver Dollar Nationals in Reno, Nevada on January 6, 1985, as a 15 expert (he may have won nationals as a novice or intermediate). This was a decisive race, for Carter promised himself if he didn't do well here, he would quit BMX racing. He ended up "tripling". Note: By either typographical error on American BMXer's part or Eric's misrecollection, he says he first won in the 1984 Silver Dollar Nationals. There were no Silver Dollar nationals in 1984.
Turned Professional:	September 2, 1989 at the National Bicycle League (NBL) Grand National in Louisville, Kentucky at 19 years of age.
First Professional race result:	First place in "B" pro at the 1989 NBL Grand Nationals on September 2. He won US$1,260, the equivalent of US$2,090.18 in 2007 (Cost of Living Calculator). He also gained a second in pro cruiser, winning US$250 (US$414.72 in 2007).
First Professional win:	See above.
First Junior Men/Pro* race result:	See above.
First Junior Men/Pro win:	See above.
First Senior Pro** race result:	Third place at the NBL Christmas Classic on December 27, 1989 in Columbus, Ohio. He won US$280 (US$464.48 in 2007). He had previously won every NBL "B" pro event he entered.
First Senior Pro win:	In "A" pro at the National Bicycle League (NBL) "Round 5: Clash in the Sun" national in Orlando, Florida on February 17, 1990.
Body size at peak of his career (1990):	Height: 5 ft 10 in (1.78 m) Weight: 175–180 pounds (79–82 kg)
Retired:	Largely by late 1995, to concentrate on mountain bike (MTB) racing.

*In the NBL, "B"/Superclass/"A" pro, depending on the era; in the ABA, "A" pro.
**In the NBL, "A"/"Elite" pro; in the ABA, "AA" pro.

=== Career factory and major bike shop sponsors ===
Note: This listing only denotes the racer's primary sponsors. At any given time, a racer could have numerous ever-changing cosponsors. Primary sponsorships can be verified by BMX press coverage and the sponsor's advertisements at the time in question. When possible, exact dates are given.

==== Amateur ====
- JMC (James Melton Cyclery) Racing Equipment: 1982
- VDC (Voris Dixon Company): 1983-Late 1984
- Free Agent (support and factory): Late 1984–November 29, 1985
- Hutch Hi-Performance BMX/Products: November 29, 1985–January 11, 1987. Carter left Hutch after the ABA Cajun Nationals and would be picked up by CW Racing just after the ABA Supernationals after a brief "sponsorship" on Bicycle Center.
- Bicycle Center (bike shop): January 16, 1987–January 23, 1987. Not really a sponsorship; he merely wore the jersey of his local bike shop during the ABA's San Bernardino, California race on January 17–18, 1987.
- CW (Custom Works) Cycles: January 23, 1987–December 31, 1987. "CW" never stood for "Coast Wheels," as is widely thought; Coast Wheels was a bike shop that Roger Worsham owned. Custom Works was a completely different and independent company. This is in contrast with JMC (Jim Melton Cyclery), which did start out as a bicycle shop and then began manufacturing its own BMX components, including entire bicycles.
- Revcore: January 1, 1988–April 1988. Revcore was owned by Roger Worsham, the same person who owned CW Racing. Revcore was a different product line, much like the aborted Shadow Racing (also owned by Roger Worsham) was in 1985. He moved the entire national CW Racing team to Revcore at the beginning of the 1988 racing season as a promotional move to publicize the Revcore product line.
- Schwinn Bicycle Company: Early April 1988–December 1989. His first race for Schwinn was the NBL Peachtree National in Peachtree, Georgia on April 10, 1988. Eric would turn pro with this sponsor.

==== Professional ====
- Schwinn Bicycle Company: Early April 1988–December 1989. Schwinn would drop its BMX racing effort after the 1989 season.
- MRC (Mike Redmen Concepts): January 1, 1990–June 1990
- Titan Inc.: June 1990–Late July 1990
- Brackens Racing: Late July 1990–Late 1992. Eric would take almost a yearlong hiatus from BMX after the 1990 ABA Grand National and raced only infrequently to forestall burnout during the 1991 season. His first returning race was the 1991 ABA Fall Nationals in Yorba Linda, California on October 26 and 27. He got a first place in "A" pro on Saturday, and second place in "A" pro on Sunday. However, shortly afterward, he took another yearlong (approximately) break to race motorcycles and do other things outside of BMX racing, again racing BMX infrequently. It was an almost unbroken absence from BMX racing for more than two years.
- Hyper Designs: September 1992–1995

=== Career bicycle motocross titles ===
Note: Listed are District, State/Provincial/Department, Regional, National, and International titles in italics. "Defunct" refers to the fact that the sanctioning body in question no longer existed at the start of the racer's career or at that stage of his/her career. Depending on point totals of individual racers, winners of Grand Nationals do not necessarily win National titles. Series and one-off Championships are also listed in block.

==== Amateur ====
National Bicycle Association (NBA)

- None

National Bicycle League (NBL)

- 1986 16 Expert and 16 Cruiser Grandnational Champion
- 1986 16 Expert and 16 Cruiser National No.1
- 1987 17 Expert and 17 Cruiser Grandnational Champion
- 1987 17 Expert and 17 Cruiser National No.1
- 1988 18-20 Grandnational Champion
- 1988 18 & Over Expert and 18-20 Cruiser National No.1

American Bicycle Association (ABA)

- 1985 15 Expert Winter Season California District 22 (CA-22) District Age Group (DAG) No.1
- 1985 15 Expert Race of Champions Champion
- 1985 15 Cruiser Grandnational Champion
- 1986 16 Expert and 16 Open Grandnational Champion.
- 1986 National No.1 Amateur
- 1986 16 Expert Gold Cup Champion.

United States Bicycle Motocross Association (USBA)

- 1986 16 Expert Race of Champions (ROC) Champion.
- 1986 16 Expert Grandnational Champion
- 1986 National No.1 Amateur

International Bicycle Motocross Federation (IBMXF)

- 1985 15 boys (Expert) Canada Cup winner
- 1985 15 boys (Expert) Gold Medal World Champion
- 1986 16 Expert and 16-17 Cruiser Gold Medal World Champion
- 1987 17 Expert Gold Medal World Champion
- 1988 18 & Over Expert Silver Medal World Champion

==== Professional ====
National Bicycle Association (NBA)

- None

National Bicycle League (NBL)

- 1989 "B" Pro Grandnational Champion
- 1993 National No.1 Pro

American Bicycle Association (ABA)

- 1989 "A" (Junior) Pro Grandnational Champion
- 1989 "A" (Junior) Pro National No.1. Starting in the 1989 season the ABA started recognizing the highest ranking of its Junior pros. However, the ABA did not award its Junior pros with No.1 plate.

United States Bicycle Motocross Association (USBA)

- None

International Bicycle Motocross Federation (IBMXF)

- None

Pro Series Championships

=== Notable BMX accolades ===
- Named one of eight top amateurs deemed top "Pros of the Future" by Super BMX & Freestyle magazine along with Billy Griggs, Mike King, Doug Davis, Matt Hadan Brent Romero, Darwin Griffin and Brad Birdwell.
- Named one of BMX Action's "Terrible Ten" top amateurs and future professionals three consecutive times: 1986, 1987, 1988
- Named eighth out of 21 racers deemed BMX's Hottest Amateurs in 1988 from a BMX Plus! poll of seven team managers which included Don Crupi of MCS, Mike Seevers of GT, Yvonne Shoup of Free Agent, Dave Custodero of Mongoose, Mike Donell of Revcore, Bill Nelson of Robinson and Racer/Team Manager of Diamond Back Harry Leary.

=== Significant BMX injuries ===
- Broke his thumb in hoarse play involving jumping up and down on a bumper of a rent a car at the NBL Memphis Classic National in Memphis, Tennessee March 25, 1988
- Broke thumb in practice the day before ABA Fall Nationals in Yorba Linda, California on October 26, 1989

=== BMX press magazine interviews and articles ===
- Terrible Ten Blurb. BMX Action May 1986 Vol.11 No.5 pg.72
- "A New Superstar: Our Man Eric" Super BMX/Freestyle April 1987 Vol.14 No.4 pg.33 A very extensive interview with Carter.
- "Eric Carter: Nine Longe Years To The Top" American BMXer June 1987 Vol.9 No.5 Extensive interview.
- Terrible Ten Mini Bio. BMX Action August 1987 Vol.12 No.8 pg.38
- "E. Carter: The Kid With All The Titles" BMX Action December 1987 Vol.12 No.12 pg.32
- Terrible Ten Mini Bio. BMX Action October 1988 Vol.13 No.10 pg.22
- "The Schwinn Race Team (AKA: Eric Carter)" Super BMX/Freestyle November 1988 Vol.15 No.11 pg.28 A mini interview with Schwinn's only national factory racer.
- Side Bar mini-interview in BMX plus! June 1990 Vol.13 No.6 pg.68
- "Directions: Psyche" Go September 1990 Vol.1 Issue 11 pg.68 Short Blurb on how to deal with the mental pressures of a big race.
- "Young Guns!!!" BMX Plus! October 1990 Vol.13 No.10 pg.64 Joint interview with fellow rookie pros Steve Veltman, Tim Hall, Kenny May, and Matt Hadan.
- "The Return of a Rager!" BMX Plus! August 1993 Vol.16 No.8 pg.31 mini interview of Eric's return to BMX racing full-time.

=== BMX magazine covers ===
Bicycle Motocross News:

- None

Minicycle/BMX Action & Super BMX:

- May 1986 Vol.13 No.5 In insert Dino Deluca.(SBMX&F)
- April 1987 Vol.14 No.4 in insert. Main image: Freestyler George Holquin.(SBMX/F)
- November 1988 Vol.15 No.11 In separate inserts Mike King & Pete Loncarevich; Jeff Donnell & Charlie Davidson; freestyler Eddie Fiola.

Bicycle Motocross Action & Go:

- December 1987 Vol.12 No.12 (BMXA)
- July 1991 Vol.2 Iss.9 in insert. Main Image is freestyler Jess Dyrenforth (Go).

BMX Plus!:

- August 1989 Vol.12 No.8 in main image foreground (Schwinn) with Travis Chipres (Mongoose), Matt Hadan (obscured silver black/blue helmet), Mike King (obscured black/silver helmet with "1"), Billy Griggs (Redline), and GT's Mike Ellis. Also in top insert with aforementioned.
- September 1992 Vol.15 No.9 in two inserts with Motorcycle Motocross (MX) racer Jeremy McGrath
- August 1993 Vol.16 No.8 (25) with Brian Foster (1) at the lower left hand side. In insert Freestyler Matt Hoffman.
- March 1994 Vol.17 No.3 (25) third from right on the starting gate with fellow pros (5) Brian Lopes (first from right), Mike King, Steve Veltman (on Carter's right), Pete Loncarevich (partly obscured) & and unidentified. In top insert Haro Monocoque BMX racing bicycle.
- August 1994 Vol.17 No.8 in background with Gary Ellis in foreground.

Bicycles and Dirt (ABA publication):

- None

BMX World: (1991-1992 version):

- January 1991 Vol.1 No.2

Snap BMX Magazine & Transworld BMX:

BMX World: (2005–Present version):

Mountain Bike Action:

Moto Mag:

- None

NBA World & NBmxA World (The official NBA/NBmxA membership publication):

- None

Bicycles Today & BMX Today (The official NBL membership publication under two names):

ABA Action, American BMXer, BMXer (The official ABA membership publication under three names):

- American BMXer October 1985 Vol.7 No.8 and two unidentified racers.
- American BMXer June 1987 Vol.9 No.5

USBA Racer (The official USBA membership publication):

== Post BMX career ==
Following in the footsteps of other legendary pros Eric Carter became a pro mountain-biker in 1993 (while still racing BMX heavily). He currently races MTB for Mongoose Bicycles in the mountain-cross and downhill divisions. However, he does race BMX during the winter to cross train and enhance his MTB racing skills.

== Mountain Bike Racing Career ==
Started Racing: 1993 at age 23.

Sub Discipline:

First Race Result:

Sanctioning Body:

=== Career MTB factory and major Non-factory sponsors ===
==== Amateur ====
No amateur status.

==== Professional ====
- Barracuda: 1994-1995
- Troy Lee Designs: 1996
- Rotec/White Bros: 1997
- GT (Gary Turner) Bicycles: December 1997-December 2000
- Mongoose Bicycles (Formerly BMX Products)/Hyundai: January 2001–Present
- GT Bicycles : January 2009–Present

=== Career Mountain Bike Racing (MTB) titles ===
==== Amateur ====
No amateur status.

==== Professional ====
Union Cycliste Internationale (UCI)

- 1998 Dual Slalom World Cup Bronze Medalist
- 1999 Dual Slalom World Cup Champion Gold Medalist
- 1999 Downhill World Champion Bronze Medalist
- 1999 World Cup Downhill Bronze Medalist
- 2001 World Cup Dual Slalom World Cup Silver Medalist
- 2002 World Cup 4-cross Bronze Medalist
- 2003 World Cup 4-cross Silver Medalist
- 2003 4-Cross World Champion Silver Medalist
- 2003 World Cup 4-cross Champion Gold Medalist
- 2004 4-cross World Champion Gold Medalist

National Off Road Bicycle Association (NORBA)

- 1999 National Downhill Champion Gold Medalist
- 1999 National Championship Series Dual Slalom Silver Medalist
- 2003 National Mountain-cross Series Champion Gold Medalist
- 2004 National Mountain-cross Series Champion
- 2003, 2005, 2006 United States National Mountain-cross Champion
- 2003 United States National Downhill Champion

USA Cycling

- 2005 & 2006 Mountain-cross National Champion

=== Notable MTB accolades ===
- He is a 1999 winner of the Visa/USA Cycling Athlete of the Year Award.

=== MTB Product Lines ===
- 2006 Mongoose Eric Carter EC-X Four Cross Full Suspension Mountain Bike

=== Significant MTB injuries ===
- Laid up for one year due to multiple injuries from mid-2004-September 2005
- Broke Collar bone in May 2006

=== Miscellaneous ===
Eric Carter had substantial input on the design of the Hyper Metro pro sized frame of the early 1990, which he raced when sponsored by Hyper Designs.

He was featured as a playable character in the 2003 racing video game Downhill Domination on the Sony PlayStation2, alongside Tara Llanes, Richie Schley, Missy Giove, and Brian Lopes. He also assisted with the game's course designs.
