= Debbie Kalsow =

American BMX racer

Personal information
- Full name: Debra Lynn Kalsow
- Born: January 23, 1968 (age 58) Big Rapids, Michigan, U.S.

Cycling career
- Sport: Cycling
- Current team: Retired
- Discipline: Bicycle Motocross (BMX)
- Role: Racer
- Rider type: Off Road

Amateur teams
- 1979-1980: East Langsing Cycle Shop
- 1980: JAG BMX
- 1981-1985: CW Racing

Debra Lynn Kalsow (b. January 23, 1968 from Lansing, Michigan U.S.) was an American amateur "Old School" Bicycle Motocross (BMX) racer whose prime competitive years were from 1981 to 1985.

== Racing career milestones ==
Note: Professional first are on the national level unless otherwise indicated.

Started racing: At age 11 in 1979. She persuaded her reluctant father to let her race like her brother Dennis "Digger" Kalsow.

Sanctioning body:

First race result:

First win (local):

Home sanctioning Body district(s): National Bicycle Association (NBA) District "A" (Arizona) 1979–1981;
American Bicycle Association (ABA) Arizona-1 (AZ-1) 1979–1985.

First sponsor: East Langsing Cycle Shop 1979.

First National race result: Third place at a National Bicycle League (NBL) in Indianapolis, Indiana on July 4, 1979.

First national win:

Turned Professional: No Professional Career

Retired: 1985

Height & weight at height of her career: Ht:" Wt:lbs

=== Career factory and major bike shop sponsors ===
Note: This listing only denotes the racer's primary sponsors. At any given time a racer could have numerous ever changing co-sponsors. Primary sponsorships can be verified by BMX press coverage and sponsor's advertisements at the time in question. When possible exact dates are given.

==== Amateur ====
- East Langsing Cycle Shop: 1979-1980
- JAG BMX: 1980-September 6, 1981
- CW (Custom Works) Racing: September 6, 1981 – 1985. The owner of CW Racing's Roger Warsham offered Debbie a sponsorship after the end of the ABA 1981 Fall Nationals in Devonshire Downs, California.

==== Professional ====
- No professional career.

=== Career bicycle motocross titles ===
Note: Listed are District, State/Provincial/Department, Regional, National, and International titles in italics. "Defunct" refers to the fact of that sanctioning body in question no longer existing at the start of the racer's career or at that stage of his/her career. Depending on point totals of individual racers, winners of Grand Nationals do not necessarily win National titles.

==== Amateur ====
National Bicycle Association (NBA)

- 1981 11-13 Powder Puff Grandnational Champion

National Bicycle League (NBL)

- 1979 11 Girls National No.1
- 1984 16 & Over Girls National No.1

American Bicycle Association (ABA)

- 1980 Intermediate Powder Puff Grandnational Champion
- 1981 13 Girls U.S. Gold Cup Champion.
- 1981, 1982 Arizona District #1 (AZ-1) Girls No.1
- 1981 13-14 Powder Puff Grandnational Champion
- 1982 National No.1 Girl.
- 1983 15 & Over Girls U.S. Gold Cup Champion.

United States Bicycle Motocross Association (USBA)

- 1984 National No.1 Girl
- 1984 15 & Over Girls 7-Up World Champion** (USBA promoted & sanctioned)

**The 7-Up World Championship race was the direct descendant of the Jag BMX World Championship races held from 1978 to 1983. Renny Roker, the promoter of the JAG BMX World Championship gave the rights to the WC to the USBA in 1984 in return for the cable television rights.

Fédération Internationale Amateur de Cyclisme (FIAC)

- None

International Bicycle Motocross Federation (IBMXF)

- None

==== Professional ====
- No professional Career.

=== Notable accolades ===
- Was the first National No.1 Girl class title holder for the ABA.

=== Significant injuries ===
- Broke her arm during practice at the ABA Summer Nationals in Elkhart, Indiana on August 14, 1983. She was laid up for approximately two weeks. She then had the cast formed around the handlebars of her bicycle in a grip fashion so she could pull up on them. Unlike other forms of bicycle racing, BMX racing involves pulling up on the handlebars to generate torque in aiding the legs in accelerating the bicycle out of the starting gate, lifting the front wheel over moguls and wheelieing out of turns. Appropriately accelerating out of turns is called "Pulling", a slang term created by Pro racer Ronnie Anderson.

== Post BMX career ==
Inducted In to the BMX National Hall of Fame

== Miscellaneous ==
- Debbi's father Denny Kalsow was an ABA track operator of the Chandler Jaycees track in Chandler, Arizona, the ABA's home track. until 1984 when he transferred the track's sanction to the United States Bicycle Motocross Association (USBA).
- Debbi's brother Dennis "Digger" Kalsow was a respected racer in his own right.
- Debbi was one of the female racers who advocated and lobbied the ABA for the girls to have their own separate points ranking and National No.1 plate.

== BMX press magazine interviews and articles ==
- "CW'S #1 Girl" ABA Action April 1983 Vol.6 No.4 pg.18
- "Debbi Kalsow" Bicycles and Dirt July 1983 Vol.1 No.10 pg.54

== BMX magazine covers ==
Note: Only magazines that were in publication at the time of the racer's career(s) are listed unless specifically noted.

Bicycle Motocross News:

- None

Minicycle/BMX Action & Super BMX:

- None

Bicycle Motocross Action & Go:

- None

BMX Plus!:

- None

Total BMX:

Bicycles and Dirt:

NBA World & NBmxA World (The official NBA/NBmxA membership publication):

Bicycles Today & BMX Today (the official NBL membership publication with one name change):

ABA Action, American BMX'er, BMXer (the official ABA membership publication with two name changes):

- April 1983 Vol.6 No.4 standing with Brent Patterson, Steve Veltman, Robert Fehd, and Greg Hill (ABAA).

USBA Racer (the official USBA membership publication):
