= National Bicycle League =

Logo of the National Bicycle League (adapted in 1990) and slogan.

The National Bicycle League (NBL) was a United States–based Bicycle Motocross (BMX) sports sanctioning body originally based in Deerfield Beach, Florida, but after several moves it was based in Hilliard, Ohio. It was created by George Edward Esser in 1974 as first the bicycle auxiliary of the National Motorcycle League (NML) then set up as an independent non-profit organization unlike the earlier National Bicycle Association (NBA) and the later American Bicycle Association (ABA). George Esser played a major part in establishing Bicycle Motocross racing in Florida and shortly after the East Coast of the United States as Ernie Alexander did in California and the West Coast. The organization that sanctions bicycle motocross races in the United States/Canada is now known as USA BMX.

== History ==
George Esser, unlike the creators of the earlier NBA and later ABA, set up a non-profit organization with a very inclusive government including a Competition Congress meetings in which opinions of how the body was being administered would be heard. It is perhaps this input and exercise of corporate democracy kept it in touch with the grassroots and from suffering periodical lost of member track operators and internal rebellions, like what happened to the ABA and NBA, in the NBA's case, fatally. Mr. Esser did not start the NBL for its own sake, but for the sake of his sons Bryan and Greg Esser who were competing in local races at the time before their father knew what BMX was. The elder Esser, being a motorcycle motocross race promoter like Ernie Alexander was on the United States's west coast before him, was dissatisfied with how the sanctionless independent tracks were run and created a bicycle motocross division of his thirty-three-year-old National Motorcycle League (NML).

The NML's Bicycle Division's first race at Miami Hollywood Speedway Park on January 26, 1974. One of George Esser's sons, the aforementioned Greg Esser, won the 14 & over class (there was no proficiency classes as we know them now, just age divisions). Greg Esser would later become the first official NBL pro Number One racer in 1979. In February 1976 Mr. Esser broke the NBL off from the NML to become its own entity. Starting in Florida in these early days its track affiliations were overwhelmingly concentrated east of the Mississippi River with only a few west of that boundary. However, after the 1981 racing season it commenced joint operations with the troubled National Bicycle Association (NBA) that was shrinking both terms of ridership and track operations. From that point on, the NBA handled race promotions, sponsor relations and marketing of NBL races but ceased sanctioning races in its own right. In return, the NBL absorbed the remaining NBA membership and tracks, particularly those west of the Mississippi, making it a truly nation spanning sanctioning body like the rival ABA.

It is associated now with Union Cycliste Internationale (UCI) through USA Cycling which it joined in 1997. USA Cycling is the sanctioning body that represents virtually all aspects of Cycling in the United States. It is in turn associated with the UCI which is the sanctioning body that governs international Cycling. The UCI, in turn, is the governing body that deals with the International Olympic Committee (IOC) that holds the Olympic Games. The UCI did have previous affiliations with the NBL through the now defunct NBL sister international organization the International Bicycle Motocross Federation (IBMXF) which the UCI absorbed in 1993 through its amateur Cycling governing body FIAC. In both cases, NBL members were able to participate in the UCI BMX World Championship that the UCI inherited from the IBMXF. However, it was the NBL joining USA Cycling that was the key to BMX being accepted by the IOC as part of the Olympic Summer Games. It was not necessary for the NBL to join USA Cycling for BMX to be part of the Olympic Games, but since it was in the United States that BMX started and most of the best racers are American, it was critical for the USA to have a representative body involved. The NBL was chosen by USA Cycling in part because of its history of being involved with BMX at the international level and it is being a non-profit organization, unlike the ABA. BMX had trouble becoming an Olympic sport in the past, particularly before the 1990s was in part because of the then in place rules against professionals in the Games. However, the professionals (especially the Americans), were the best in the sport and to leave them out of the competition would not be showcasing the best. Much more importantly, this was the realization in other sports which has led to the elimination of the bar against professionals in the Olympic Games in all sports in the 1990s.

BMX is now part of the Olympic Summer Games and the first Olympiad for BMX was the 2008 Summer Olympics in Beijing, China.

Throughout its history, the NBL had a fierce independent streak. In 2002, its members foiled an attempt by USA Cycling Chief Executive Officer Gerard Bisceglia to sell the NBL its arch-rival, the ABA. This episode elevated "the Sanction Wars" in BMX Racing to a new level, and the bitter rivalry raged on for nearly a decade, until the NBL faltered, following a series of managerial and strategic blunders which played out from 2009-2011.

The New NBL and Final Stand

In August 2010, Managing Director Gary Aragon enacted a laundry list of radical changes to the NBL's programming, membership format and relationship with tracks—in an effort to jumpstart participation and "out-innovate" the ABA. The centerpiece of this was the "All You Can Race" membership. Modeled after a traditional health club membership (where you pay a monthly fee, and enjoy unlimited access to any facility in the system), the All You Can Race membership removed traditional per-race entry fees, in favor of a three-tiered, all-inclusive annual membership fee. For $99, $245 or $395, a member could race an unlimited number of local, regional or national races, respectively. With no per-race entry fees being paid by participants, the NBL announced it would pay tracks a fixed rate of ~US$6 per entry (20" and/or cruiser). Furthermore, tracks would no longer need to pay the NBL any fees at all—but would rely on the central office for nearly 100% of their revenue. Critics quickly hit the message boards with their assertions that the All You Can Race program was mathematically impossible to sustain, and would likely spell the end of the organization before the first season was out (after all, it only required 16.5 local races to put the NBL in the red on a single membership). The 2010 changes also included a spaghetti bowl of changes to the NBL's class structure (effectively doubling the number of classes), points table, proficiency move-up methodology and professional/elite race series. Many members and track operators found it difficult or impossible to follow the new ruleset, which led to uncertainty and inconsistency in how programs were being run and administered.

Part of the "New NBL" program was the so-called "Nations Tour," a four-race elite series, run on a Supercross-style track. The tour would feature "Big Show" production values, and prize purses of nearly US$50,000 per stop (approximately 10x the amount awarded at traditional nationals). The first event was to be run March 4–5, 2011 in Primm Nevada, outside Las Vegas, with stops in Pittsburgh, Louisville and a finale in Sarasota, FL. Again, critics went to work on the granular details of the series, such as the weather in Primm, Nevada, in March, the lack of sufficient medical facilities to serve the frequent-and-predictable injuries that occur at an SX event, how the finale would manage to run time trials and the actual race in one day (which is inconsistent with the SX format), and the nagging question of where the NBL, who was self-admittedly cash-strapped throughout 2010, would come up with the funding to produce the series.

On December 16, 2010, the NBL took things further, with an announcement that they had acquired the exclusive marketing and production rights to the UCI BMX Racing World Cup series. Considered a coup, even by critics, the World Cup series is a five-stop annual tour and is the gateway to the Olympic Games, via the nation and rider points earned by athlete finishes. The NBL would form a new company, Global SX Events (GSX), of which it would own 51% interest. The remaining 49% would be owned equally by Johan Lindstrom and Tom Ritzenthaler, both of whom worked as staffers for the UCI leading into the rights acquisition. Speculation was that the NBL had to pay UCI a considerable fee (some say as large as US$500,000) for these rights, and the whole affair, from August to December was starting to look (even to NBL loyalists) like an extreme risk, a critical misstep and a textbook example of "biting off more than one can chew" all at once. Pundits opined that it would either revolutionize BMX Racing, or bring the NBL down in a flaming wreck—nothing in-between.

The NBL began accepting membership conversions to the new "All You Can Race" system at the 2010 Grands, and had collected a sizable pool of cash in prepayment of these memberships, by the end of the year.

Almost immediately, cracks in the system were evident, when basic member services such as membership cards being mailed out to new members, started to slip. It was clear that the NBL office had neither the manpower nor the information systems to adequately administer the changes. Observers could also see an organization who had been trained to do business one way, now forced to "write with their left hand," and do things that were outside their zone of comfort (like sending timely checks to tracks each month instead of the other way around). Management struggled to keep a positive face on things, and the first races run under the "All You Can Race" format showed impressive rider counts. But the true test for the system would prove to be once the track payments started coming due.

As big as the fanfare was for the NationsTour, January came and went without a whisper about the race, a marquee sponsor, or who would attend. On February 11, the NBL/GSX announced it has canceled the Primm, NV event in March, citing "unexpected hold ups." To many observers, this was the first sign of serious trouble for the "New NBL." Perhaps the above operational issues, such as membership cards being late, could be chalked up to staff getting accustomed to a new system—but a key event being canceled, with only two-weeks notice (after receiving little-to-no promotion prior to cancelation, which cast doubt on whether it was ever intended to run at all), made the BMX industry very nervous and increasingly skeptical of the NBL's long-term prospects.

The 2011 rulebook was released on March 3, Five months after the 2011 season started. By mid-March, complaints were starting to show up on message boards that the NBL office in Ohio was practically impossible to raise by phone; and that payments to tracks under the "All You Can Race" program were late, inaccurate or nonexistent. The massively-complex points system enacted as part of the "New NBL" required constant babysitting on the part of parents and team managers; and "The Nation" magazine (published by an outside independent publisher) was visibly starting to sputter (with downgrades to paper quality and thready frequency early in 2011).

The granular details of exactly how the NBL's final weeks and days unfolded are not yet publicly known. However it came to be, on the afternoon of May 11, 2011 rumors began leaking that the NBL would layoff its staff and cease operations within two weeks. The following morning, NBL CEO Gary Aragon was interviewed on industry website BMXNews.com and said, famously "The NBL is not going out of business…we are here to stay and will be for a long time." Five days later, on May 17, Aragon appeared in a joint webinar with ABA CEO BA Anderson, and COO John David, to announce the agreement-in-principle and letter of intent (which had been hurriedly approved by the NBL board the previous evening) for the ABA to acquire the assets of the NBL for an undisclosed sum (later estimated at about US$250,000 based on court documents). The combined organization would be renamed USA BMX, and both the ABA and NBL brands would live on as "sub-leagues" (as with the National and American Leagues in Major League baseball, a proposal that was later abandoned). The ABA assumed responsibility for the NBL's ~5,000 members, granting them a complimentary membership to ABA/USA BMX for the balance of 2011, but returning to the pay-as-you-race format of paying race day entry fees. The ABA also brought the NBL tracks into the fold, propping up insurance coverage, and returning the mode of operation to pre "New NBL" methodology. Though tracks were owed a large sum of money by the NBL (for "All You Can Race" payouts), they could now get back to traditional forms of revenue.

After a month of due diligence and negotiations, the final merger documents were signed on June 18, 2011, marking an end to the NBL's 37-year operation, and officially ending the "Sanction War" that had existed, in some form or another in North American BMX racing for as long as the NBL had existed.

On August 10, 2011, the NBL Board of Directors was officially dissolved, as a petition was filed in Franklin County (OH) Court to appoint a receiver to administer the disposal of the NBL's remaining assets (chiefly the cash paid by the ABA to acquire the operating assets, and the NBL's 51% stake in GSX). The receiver would be responsible for disbursing cash held by the estate to persons or entities filing claims with the receiver. These claimants include suppliers, tracks, pro riders owed purse money, teams owed prize money and other creditors.

On October 12, 2011, the receiver filed a motion with the court to sell the NBL's 51% share of GSX to a Gahanna, OH-based private equity group for US$5,000 in cash.

On November 17, 2011, the receiver filed an update stating that all assets had been converted to cash and that the receiver was prepared to settle the dozens of claims that had been filed. The claims totaled US$673,613.22, and the receiver held $257,907.62 in cash following the asset sales. This meant that each claimant would get 38 cents on the dollar.

== Vital statistics ==
Statistic	Details
Founded	In January 1974 as the bicycle auxiliary to the National Motorcycle League (NML). It was founded as an independent organization on February 1, 1976.
Motto(s)/Slogan(s)	"The Sanctioning Body from Coast to Coast"; "The Best in BMX"; "We are BMX"
Years of operation	1974–2011
Original Headquarters	Deerfield Beach, Florida
Final Headquarters	Gahanna, Ohio
Original Owner	George Esser (January 1974-April 1983)
Current Owner	Bernie Anderson (June 2011 – Present)
Original President	George Esser (January 1974-April 1983)
Original Executive Director	George Esser
Final Executive/Managing Director	Gary Aragon (December 2009 – 2011)
Peak claimed number of tracks	200 (1985)
Claimed present number of tracks	Approx. 150+ (as of November 2007).
Peak claimed number of members	49,000 (1985)
Claimed number of members	Approximately 5,000 (May 2011).
First sanctioned race	Miami Hollywood Speedway Park on January 26, 1974, in Miami, Florida.
First National	At the North Park track in Pittsburgh, Pennsylvania, in 1977
First Grand National	1977. By 1978 The NBL had 18 tracks and 4,100 members.
Last Grand National	2011
Racing season	Virtually year round. Mid-September to early September.
In house newspaper	Bicycles Today originally as a tabloid type newspaper beginning in August 1977. It would later change format (and eventually name) and become a magazine.
In house magazine	Bicycles Today, later name changed to BMX Today In December 2009 BMX Today ceased publication as a hardcopy print magazine and became an online-only website.
Span	National, in its early years with most tracks east of the Mississippi River.

In an interview conducted by former BMX racer Greg Hill at the online BMX discussion website bmxactiononline.com Bob Tedesco revealed his intention of stepping down as Managing Director of the National Bicycle League at the end of 2008 after 33 years involvement with BMX and the NBL, beginning as a track operator and then Northern Regional Commissioner in 1977, his first national post with the NBL. He was the longest-serving head of the NBL (1983–2008).

== Operations ==
=== Proficiency and division class levels and advancement method ===
Note: The following classifications are for the 2007 racing season:

Milestone	Event Details
Proficiency levels Amateur 20" class	Rookie: 5 & Under to 17 & over in one year steps, Boys and girls. Novice: 5 & Under to 16 in one year steps then 17-18, 19-25, 26-34, 35-40, 41 & over. Boys and Men only Expert: Same as Novice except 5 &6 year olds compete together and no one younger than 5 competes in expert.
Amateur Cruiser	8 & Under, 9-10, 11-12, 13-14, 15-16, 17-24 25-29, 30-34, 35-39, 40-44, 45-49, 50 & Over. Boys & Men only
Girls 20" Amateur (age classifications only)	Rookie, (boys and girls) See above. Girls class (amateur): 5-7 then from 8 to 17 & over in one year steps.
Girls Cruiser	12 & under, 13-14, 15-16, 17-24, 25-29, 30-34, 35-39, 40-44, 45 & Over.
Open	7& under, 8-9, 10-11, 12-13, 14-15, 16 & over Open wheel* (boys and girls); 16 & over girls.
Professional 20" classes	Masters (30 & over pros), Super X (formerly "B" Pro, Superclass, "A" Pro) 16 & over, Junior men (17-18), Elite Men (AA Pro) 19 & over, Men only. Junior Women (17-18), Elite Women (19 & over), Elite Open, 16 & over women ("Big A" only).
Professional Cruiser Class	Men Elite Cruiser. (defunct); Women Elite Cruiser. (defunct)
Qualifying system	Moto system a.k.a. Cumulative System a.k.a. Olympic System.

=== Jurisdictions ===
While the ABA and the USBA was divided up into districts that could be of an entire state or multiple districts within a state; and the NBA was made up of super districts that could be one state or several states, the NBL was divided up into regions about three states each, however, unlike the rival NBA, ABA and USBA that rewarded district number to their racers within the region culminating in a Regional #1 plate at seasons' end there seemed to have been no regional number one plate for the NBL jurisdictions. They seemed to have been strictly administrative. Thus (in 1982 for example [to be updated as more current information is acquired]):

Region 1
- New Hampshire
- Maine
- Connecticut

Region 2
- New Jersey
- New York
- Pennsylvania

Region 3
- Virginia
- West Virginia

Region 4
- Georgia
- Tennessee

Region 5
- Indiana
- Ohio

Region 6 & 7
- Missouri
- Wisconsin
- Illinois

Region 8
- Texas
- Oklahoma
- Louisiana

Region 9, 10, 11
- California
- Arizona

Region 12
- Florida

== NBL Rule book ==
- NBL National series classifications and age divisions for 2007. PDF file. Need Adobe Acrobat to read
- National Bicycle League Rule Book (2006). PDF file.
- Link to download the free Adobe Acrobat reader.

== NBL National number ones by year ==
Note: Dates reflect the year the racers *won* their plates, not the year they actually *raced* their No.1 plates. In other words, Anthony Sewell won his No.1 plate in 1980 entitling him to race with #1 on his plate for the 1981 season. Stu Thomsen then won the No.1 plate in 1981 and raced with #1 on his plate during the 1982 racing season.

Elite ("A") Pro Nat.#1

- 1978 Sal Zeuner**
- 1979 Greg Esser**
- 1980 Anthony Sewell
- 1981 Stu Thomsen
- 1982 Stu Thomsen
- 1983 Eric Rupe
- 1984 Eric Rupe
- 1985 Greg Hill
- 1986 Pete Loncarevich
- 1987 Pete Loncarevich
- 1988 Greg Hill
- 1989 Gary Ellis
- 1990 Terry Tenette
- 1991 Terry Tenette
- 1992 Terry Tenette
- 1993 Eric Carter
- 1994 Gary Ellis
- 1995 John Purse
- 1996 John Purse
- 1997 Christophe Lévêque
- 1998 Christophe Lévêque
- 1999 Danny Nelson
- 2000 Thomas Allier
- 2001 Jamie Staff
- 2002 Kyle Bennett
- 2003 Randy Stumpfhauser
- 2004 Kyle Bennett
- 2005 Mike Day
- 2006 Donny Robinson
- 2007 Kyle Bennett
- 2008 Randy Stumpfhauser
- 2009 Maris Strombergs
- 2010 Maris Strombergs
- 2011 Matt Kelty

Pro Nat.#1 (Elite) Cruiser

- 1978 CDNE*
- 1979 CDNE
- 1980 CDNE
- 1981 Brent Patterson
- 1982 Brent Patterson
- 1983 Brent Patterson
- 1984 Toby Henderson
- 1985 Greg Hill
- 1986 Greg Hill
- 1987 Eric Rupe
- 1988 Eric Rupe
- 1989 Ron Walker
- 1990 Kenny May
- 1991 Barry McManus
- 1992 Barry McManus
- 1993
- 1994 Justin Green
- 1995
- 1996
- 1997 Kiyomi Waller
- 1998 Randy Stumpfhauser
- 1999 Dale Holmes
- 2000 Kevin Tomko
- 2001 Randy Stumpfhauser
- 2002 Randy Stumpfhauser
- 2003 Randy Stumpfhauser
- 2004 Randy Stumpfhauser
- 2005 Donny Robinson
- 2006 TD****
- 2007 TD
- 2008 TD
- 2009 TD
- 2010 ----
- 2011 ----

* "B" Pro/Super-EX Nat.#1

- 1978 CDNE
- 1979 CDNE
- 1980 CDNE
- 1981 James Gandy (ca. exp)
- 1982 James Gandy (ca. exp)
- 1983 James Gandy (ca. exp)
- 1984 James Gandy (ca./world)
- 1985 TDNE
- 1986 TDNE
- 1987 TDNE
- 1988 TDNE
- 1989 TDNE
- 1990 Benard Gant
- 1991 Barry McManus
- 1992 Brian Foster
- 1993
- 1994
- 1995
- 1996
- 1997 Jeff Dein
- 1998 Steven Spahr
- 1999 Todd Lyons
- 2000
- 2001
- 2002 Jonathan Suarez
- 2003 Derek Betcher
- 2004 Augusto Castro
- 2005 Derek Betcher
- 2006 TD****
- 2007 TD
- 2008 Kris Fox
- 2009 Josh Meyers
- 2010 CJ Mc Guire
- 2011 ----

"A" Pro Cruiser Nat.#1

- 1978 CDNE
- 1979 CDNE
- 1980 CDNE
- 1981 CDNE
- 1982 CDNE
- 1983 CDNE
- 1984 CDNE
- 1985 CDNE
- 1986 CDNE
- 1987 CDNE
- 1988 CDNE
- 1989 CDNE
- 1990 CDNE
- 1991 CDNE
- 1992 CDNE
- 1993 CDNE
- 1994 CDNE
- 1995 CDNE
- 1996 CDNE
- 1997 CDNE
- 1998
- 1999
- 2000
- 2001
- 2002 Eric Rupe
- 2003 Jason Carnes
- 2004
- 2005
- 2006
- 2007 TD****
- 2008 TD
- 2009 TD
- 2010 ----
- 2011 ----

Pro Nat. #1 Masters

- 1978 CDNE
- 1979 CDNE
- 1980 CDNE
- 1981 CDNE
- 1982 CDNE
- 1983 CDNE
- 1984 CDNE
- 1985 CDNE
- 1986 CDNE
- 1987 CDNE
- 1988 CDNE
- 1989 CDNE
- 1990 CDNE
- 1991 CDNE
- 1992 CDNE
- 1993 CDNE
- 1994 CDNE
- 1995 CDNE
- 1996 CDNE
- 1997
- 1998
- 1999
- 2000 Eric Rupe
- 2001
- 2002
- 2003
- 2004 Eric Rupe
- 2005 Dave Bittner
- 2006 Kiyomi Waller
- 2007 Jason Carnes
- 2008 Kenth Fallen
- 2009 Dale Holmes
- 2010 Joey Albright
- 2011 ----

Amateur & Elite Pro Nat.#1 Women

- 1978 CDNE
- 1979 CDNE
- 1980 CDNE
- 1981 Kathy Schachel(Am)†
- 1982 Kathy Schachel(Am)
- 1983 Kathy Schachel(Am)
- 1984 Debbie Kalsow(Am)
- 1985 Kathy Schachel(Pro)
- 1986 Kathy Schachel(Pro)
- 1987 Gaby Bayhi(Pro)
- 1988 Stacey Lupfer(Am)
- 1989 Jennifer Wardle(Am)
- 1990 Christy Homa(Am)
- 1991 Melanie Cline(Am)
- 1992 Marie McGilvary(Am)
- 1993 Michelle Cairns(Am)
- 1994 Marie McGilvary(Am)
- 1995 Marie McGilvary(Am)
- 1996 Marie McGilvary(Am)
- 1997 Michelle Cairns
- 1998 Michelle Cairns
- 1999 Marie McGilvar
- 2000 Natarsha Williams
- 2001 Natarsha Williams
- 2002 Jill Kintner
- 2003 Kim Hayashi
- 2004 Kim Hayashi
- 2005 Kim Hayashi
- 2006 Kim Hayashi
- 2007 Kim Hayashi
- 2008 Stephanie Barragan
- 2009 Dominique Daniels
- 2010 Dominique Daniels
- 2011 Alaina Henderson

Am Nat.#1 Girls Cruiser

- 1978 CDNE
- 1979 CDNE
- 1980 CDNE
- 1981 CDNE
- 1982 CDNE
- 1983 CDNE
- 1984 CDNE
- 1985 CDNE
- 1986 CDNE
- 1987 CDNE
- 1988 CDNE
- 1989 CDNE
- 1990 CDNE
- 1991 Michelle Cairns
- 1992
- 1993
- 1994
- 1995
- 1996
- 1997
- 1998
- 1999
- 2000
- 2001
- 2002
- 2003
- 2004
- 2005
- 2006
- 2007
- 2008 TD****
- 2009 TD
- 2010 ----
- 2011 ----

1984 World Championship at Griffith Park Ca., Team Open Air Schwinn #1 of Camarillo Ca.

'*'Class Did Not Exist

**Until the 1980 season the #1 plate holder was considered #1 overall amateur or professional. The NBL did have a pro class in 1977, 1978 & 1979 but the title of National Number One Professional was not created until the 1980 season when the pros and the 16 Experts were separated and the pros earning separate points (in the form of purse money won) from the amateurs. Prior to 1980 the pros, due to the comparatively small number of them, competed with the 16 Experts and were able to earn amateur titles.

'***'Title Did Not Exist The class did exist under the title of "B" pro (which was created at the beginning of the 1981 season), but it was not until 1990 when the name was changed to "Superclass" and it became a pro/am division were the racers of that class given an opportunity to win a separate year-end overall National #1 plate title separate from the pure Pro and the pure amateur classes. Amateurs competed for prizes and Pros could compete for a limited amount purses. Also beginning in the 1990 season "Pro Cruiser" was renamed "Super Cruiser" and "A" Pro "All Pro". In 1996 Super Cruiser was renamed "Pro Cruiser" once again and "All" Pro reverted to "Pro Class" This was to harmonize NBL nomenclature with UCI/IBMXF labels. Because of this, the NBL would change the name of its pro Classes many times during the 1990s, They even began calling their senior pro class "AA" and the junior pros "A" just like the ABA beginning in the year 2000. The senior male pro class is now officially known as Elite Men and the junior men were "A" pro. The single level pro females are called Elite Women. Beginning with the 2006 season the NBL ceased offering an independent year-end title for both the "A" pro class and the Pro Cruisers. In the case of Pro Cruiser it was an end of a long era with the Pro Cruiser No.1 title going back to 1981 when Brent Patterson first won the class.

'****'Title Discontinued

†(AM)=Amateur. From 1981 to 1984 the girl's National No.1 title was amateur. Between 1985 and 1987 a Women's pro class was established but that division was discontinued between 1988 and 1996 due to lack of participants on a consistent basis. Thus the National No.1 women titles were again amateur. From 1997 to the present the title designation is professional once again.

== Special Race Series ==
- Invitational President's Cup.

This is a championship race that was inaugurated in December 1985 in which NBL racers who qualified for their state championships were invited to race this special event held just before the NBL Christmas National. It has been traditionally run during the last week of the year in December in Columbus, Ohio. Unlike the American Bicycle Association (ABA)'s Redline Cup (formerly known as the Gold Cup) which was a championship series for individual glory of the local non sponsored racer, the NBL's President's Cup is geared that the racers from each state is encouraged to represent their state in the form of teams. The state with the greatest representation in the main events win and that state would get the bulk of prize money put up by the national governing body of the NBL. It would be doled out to the winning states NBL governing commission. For instance, if Ohio happens to have the largest numbers of members in the mains, 12 racers as opposed to Alabama's nine or New York's 10, then Ohio would win and its state NBL's commission would get the prize money. In addition to the competition between the states, there are team competitions between bicycle shops and factories in their own divisions.

Also unlike the ABA's Gold Cup no professionals are allowed to compete, only amateurs in the Expert, Girls, and Cruiser classes participating.

== See also ==
- American Bicycle Association
- National Bicycle Association
- National Pedal Sport Association
- United Bicycle Racers Association
- United States Bicycle Motocross Association
