= United States Bicycle Motocross Association =

United States Bicycle Motocross Association (USBA)
- Formation: 1984
- Founder: Rich Mann, Dave Cook, Geoff Sims, Steve Schaefer and Rod Keeling
- Dissolved: 1986
- Headquarters: Tempe, Arizona

The United States Bicycle Association (USBA) was a Bicycle Motocross (BMX) national sanctioning body based in Tempe, Arizona. It was founded in March 1984 by five former members of the American Bicycle Association (ABA): Rich Mann, Dave Cook, Geoff Sims, Steve Schaefer and Rod Keeling, who became the USBA's first president. Keeling was previously the ABA's former vice president of marketing and prior to that a pilot with the ABA's failed air charter service. It was to last only for two and a half seasons before being brought on by the ABA early in 1986 season (the ABA itself was by then was under new ownership).

== Succession ==
Mennenga was the sole owner of the ABA at the time and directed the sanctioning body in an autocratic fashion. Mennenga filed suit against the 5 individuals for breach of contract in 1984. No contracts were ever produced by Mennenga and the suit was dismissed. Many believe that the lawsuit was an attempt by the ABA to crush the new competitors, and while unsuccessful, it did bleed time and resources from the USBA and engendered the destructive atmosphere that was to follow.

Of the original five founders of the USBA, Dave Cook and Geoff Sims, both commercial pilots, left the company for flying jobs shortly after its creation. Soon after the 1985 USBA Grand National in October, Keeling was forced out of the USBA by the major USBA investor group, led by Ira Hall. This occurred while Hall was negotiating a merger with the potential new ABA owners and Keeling became a liability to the deal.

The 1985 USBA Grand National held in the Tarrant County Civic Center in Fort Worth, Texas, could arguably be recognized as the high point for the sanctioning body. With over 200 motorcycles, an indoor arena dirt track and some of the top riders participating.

== Accusations ==
The USBA did used tactics to lure tracks away from the ABA, including track operator Gary Ellis Sr., father of pro racer Gary Ellis Jr., who ran the ABA affiliated River Valley BMX track in Sumner, Washington State. This was an unsuccessful attempt to have Ellis transfer his allegiance to the USBA from the ABA. The USBA denounced the ABA and warned of its supposed imminent demise without saying how joining the USBA would benefit the track operator and what the USBA could do for BMX as a whole. While many ABA track operators remained loyal to the ABA despite its past problems, over 160 left to the USBA, effectively dividing the ABA BMX racing world.

ABA had many creditors, some of them with substantial funds at risk that may have been involved. The Internal Revenue Service (IRS) was cited as a suspect since they had ongoing legal actions against them. Indeed, it was pressure from them that made the ABA file Chapter 11 even though the new owners were trying to avoid it. IRS agents were on hand observing the 1985 ABA Grand National in Oklahoma. It was very clear that they were under investigation. The IRS had easy access to the ABA's Bank records. Unless they had a court order, bugging a telephone line would be an illegal and unnecessary risk with little to gain.

In ill-advised move, the new USBA management had business dealings with disgraced promoter Renny Roker. This promoter who gained so much respect with his JAG World Championship series held from 1978 to 1982 lost all that respect with his ill-fated 1983 ESPN Pro Spectacular Series, culminating in the defaulting of the professional racer's winnings in the last race in Burbank, California, including series champion Greg Hill. His and other pro racer's checks "bounced" when they attempted to redeem them. For that and other infractions had made Renny Roker a pariah in the BMX World.

Thus it was a surprise for USBA who knew of Roker's soiled reputation to have dealings with him in any fashion. As much as it was ill-advised, they had an agreement with Roker that he would tape for broadcast on cable TV by the Nickelodeon network the USBA's San Diego National held in early 1986. The USBA promoted heavily in advertising that that event would be broad cast by the cable network. Many of the top BMX bicycle manufactures including Murry, Redline, GT, CW et al. sent their factory teams to that race in the hope of TV exposure for their products. Not only was that San Diego national was a typical low turnout USBA event, Roker did not appear to tape the nations for the promised TV coverage. The USBA blamed Renny Roker for making false promises to them while many suspected that the USBA used the ruse of promised national television coverage to boost their attendance levels. Whatever the truth it left many manufactures embittered toward the USBA for the rest of its existence.

The ending of that existence was not long in coming.

After a shaky first two years of operations, it met with financial problems during 1986 which was the result of low sign ups for its nationals that plagued it from the beginning. Factors that fed this apathy by racers were poor track construction; delays in running of races; equipment failure, holding their nationals which coincided with those of the ABA and NBL. For instance during the low amateur sign up (the professionals attended in mass) Pro Series No.3 held near Las Vegas, Nevada, in 1986 the electronic starting gate broke and starts had to look back to an earlier era of BMX and manually drop the gate. This was on top of race delays and a poorly constructed, maintained and dusty track.

In early 1986 to obtain more members, the USBA brought the freestyle BMX National Freestyle Association (NFA) sanctioning body in early 1986 from Hutch Hi-Performance BMX, a bicycle company that had created the NFA originally in 1985. Within a couple of months the USBA itself would be bought out.

Ironically, the USBA approached the ABA with an offer of a buyout despite its own financial difficulties. The ABA itself was in financial dire straits and was in Chapter 11 financial reorganization. As it turned out, the USBA turned out to be in worse financial health and it was the ABA who would make a counter offer to buy the USBA. While the ABA was in Chapter 11, it could not buy any part the USBA or merge with it under the law as a company. However, two new stockholders of the ABA corporation at the time, Jamie Vargas and Bernie Anderson brought a 60% controlling shares of USBA stock as individuals from USBA investor Ira Hall. Bernie Anderson and Jamie Vargas had jointly bought controlling shares of stock in the struggling ABA in April 1985 from its founder and president Merl Mennenga and took control of the USBA on April 1, 1986. By all accounts were turning it around financially. They allowed the USBA to run as a separate sanctioning body for the rest of the 1986 racing season.

The two sanctioning bodies formally merged in 1987 after the ABA cleared Chapter 11. It inherited all of the USBA's 136 tracks and membership.

The last USBA sanctioned (but under ABA management) race, the 1986 Grand Nationals was held in Ft. Worth, Texas, on October 26, 1986, at the famed Cowtown track, an ABA affiliated race course. This was a next to last minute change of venue when the previously chosen site proved unsuitable. Approximately 700 racers attended in 116 motos, very well attended by USBA standards. It was by all accounts a well run race on a well received track. The short, inglorious days of United States Bicycle Association ended on an up note.

== Vital statistics ==
Milestone	Event Details
Founded:	March 23, 1984
Motto(s)/Slogan(s):	
Years of operation:	1984–1986
Original Headquarters:	Tempe, Arizona
Last Headquarters:	Same
Original Owner(s):	Rich Mann, Dave Cook, Geoff Sims, Steve Schaefer and Rod Gibson
Last Owner:	Jamie Vargas & Barnard Anderson
Original President:	Rodney M. Gibson (1984–1985)
Last President:	Clayton John (1986)
Original Vice President:	
Last Vice President:	
Employees (peak):	
First track:	The first tracks opened in May 1984. By August 1984 at the time of its first National, there were 46 tracks.
Peak claimed number of tracks:	136.
Number of original members:	
Peak claimed number of members:	
Racing Season:	January to late October or early November.
First sanctioned race:	
First National:	The Rocky Mountain Nationals in Ogden, Utah, on August 18 & 19, 1984.
Number of nationals per year:	13 (including Grand National) 1986.
First Grand National:	Ft. Worth, Texas, on November 18, 1984.
Last Grand National:	Cowtown Track, Ft. Worth, Texas, on October 26, 1986.
In house newspaper:	None
In house magazine:	USBA Racer
Span:	National in 26 states plus the Bahamas.

According to the last issue of USBA Racer, which was embedded in the January/February 1987 issue of American BMXer, the last USBA sanctioned races occurred on December 14, 1986, at the Desert Downs track in Texas and the Alameda Raceway track in New Mexico.

== Proficiency and division class labels and advancement method ==
Milestone	Event Details
Amateur proficiency and age levels 20 inch class:	Novice: 5 & Under, then 6 to 17 & Over in one year steps. Advanced, Expert: 6 & Under, then 7 to 17 & Over in one year steps. Open: 6 & Under, 7–8, 9–10, 11–12, 13–14, 15–16, 17 & Over. Age classifications only.
Division Girls 20 inch:	Age classifications only; Amateur only. 6 & Under, 7, then 9–14 & Over in one year steps.
Amateur Cruiser:	12 & Under, then 13 to 16 in one year steps, then 17–21, 22–30, 31 & Over.
Professional Divisions:	Limited Pro, Unlimited Pro (both later changed to "B" pro and "A" pro respectively). Men only. Pro Cruiser. Men only. Pro Girls. Women only. (The USBA had Pro Girls class written in its rule book for the 1986 season, becoming the second BMX Governing body after the National Bicycle League to establish a female pro division. However, before the first pro Girl race could be held the USBA was folded and was bought by the American Bicycle Association which didn't pursue the use of a Pro Girls division).
Qualifying system:	Direct Transfer System generally, but left up to the individual tracks discretion as to use the transfer system or Moto system.

== Operations ==
Whatever the politics and motivations, since the management were former ABA officials it is not surprising that many ABA practices carried over to the new governing body, like the use of the Direct Transfer System, in which a racer has to win just one moto or heat to transfer to the finals or Mains. In smaller races perhaps two or more racers would transfer. In larger races the rider(s) transfers not to the Main but to the semi-finals, or if necessary the quarter-finals, 1/8s and 1/16.

This is different from National Bicycle League (NBL) practice of using the moto or Olympic system, which has all the racers in that class run three times and their individual places average out over a points system. Those who place first through fourth highest in average moto points would then transfer to the Main, or again if necessary to semi-finals, etc.

For the first two seasons of its existence the USBA practiced a nearly unique system of advancement in the amateur ranks called the "Bye". In a Bye, if you won your class at a national level race held a day before the Grand Nationals (called a pre-race) you did not have to race the qualifying motos in the Grand Nationals. You could go directly to the semi-finals, or if the class was large, the quarter-finals, 8ths, etc. This involved very complicated paperwork integrating the previous days class winners into the semis of the Grand National competitors who worked their way up in the qualifying motos. The Bye was dropped due to this complexity for the 1986 season. This system was tried before by the National Bicycle Association (NBA) in 1974 and it also failed both for its complexity and the perceived unfairness of transferring racers to the semi-finals (or quarter finals, etc.) by not earning that position by racing the qualifying motos like everyone else had to during that event.

On the pro level in the ABA, NBL and USBA, the Main is run three times and the winner is determined by the lowest main point average. On the amateur level in all three sanctions the Main is just run once in winner take all fashion.

The USBA like the ABA also had an overall number one amateur male and female and an overall amateur cruiser number one, again different from NBL practice of awarding number ones for separate age groups.

== United States Bicycle Association list of National number ones ==
Pro Nat.#1

- 1984 Eric Rupe
- 1985 Greg Hill
- 1986 Pete Loncarevich

Pro Cruiser Nat.#1

- Robert Fehd
- Greg Hill
- Greg Hill

Amat. Nat.#1

- 1984 Bobby Scheidel
- 1985 Larson Manuelito
- 1986 Eric Carter

Amat. Nat.#1 Cruiser

- 1984 Brad Boll
- 1985 Larson Manuelito
- 1986 Jason Jones

Amat. Nat.#1 Women

- 1984 Debbie Kalsow
- 1985 Michelle Gibson
- 1986 Michelle Gibson

== See also ==
- American Bicycle Association
- National Bicycle Association
- National Bicycle League
- National Pedal Sport Association
- United Bicycle Racers
