= American Bicycle Association =

Bicyle motocross organization

USA BMX: The American Bicycle Association
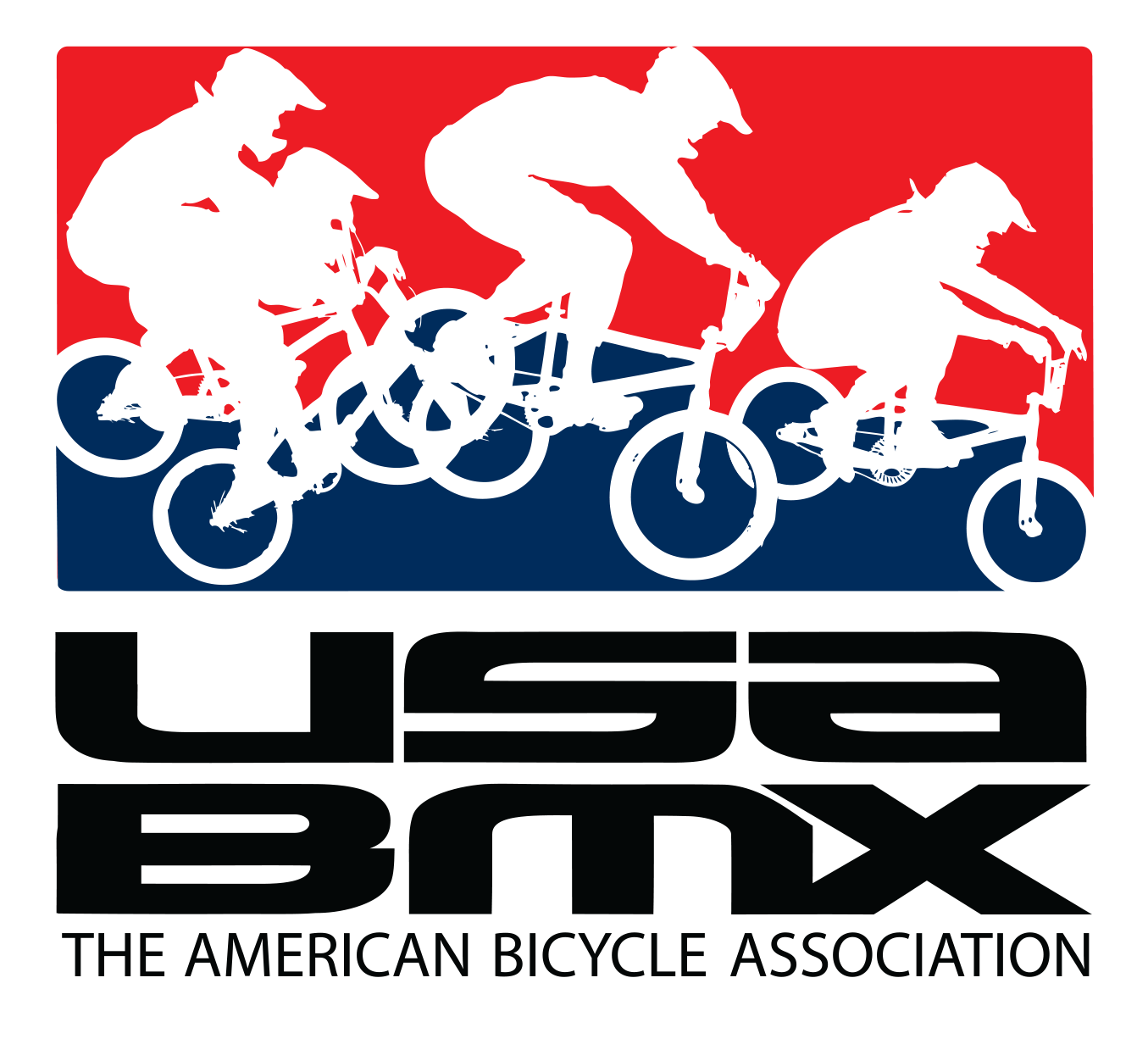
- Formation: August 30, 1977; 49 years ago
- Founder: Merl Mennenga
- Type: Sports governing body
- Headquarters: Gilbert, Arizona, U.S.
- Region served: North America
- Members: 70,000 (2017)
- Board chair: Bernie Anderson
- CEO: B. A. Anderson (2009 – 2023)
- President: Shane Fernandez (2020 – 2023)
- Key people: Merl Mennenga (president 1977–1985); Gene Roden (vice president 1977–1982); Walt Ehnat (president 1985-1986); Clayton John (president 1986-2008)
- Main organ: Pull (since 2011); formerly ABA Action (1977-1984), American BMX'er (1984-1996), BMX'er (1996-2011)
- Website: www.usabmx.com
- Remarks: First sanctioned race: September 24, 1977, at Manzanita Raceway in Tucson, Arizona; First Grand National: December 9, 1978, in Las Vegas

The American Bicycle Association (ABA) was a US-based BMX racing governing body in Gilbert, Arizona. In 2011, the ABA merged with the former National Bicycle League and became the present-day USA BMX: The American Bicycle Association. The ABA was founded by Merl Mennenga and Gene Roden in 1977. Reportedly one of the world's largest BMX associations, it has tracks in the United States (under USA BMX) and in Canada (under BMX Canada).

== History ==
The ABA was founded as a governing body to preserve BMX racing's competitive spirit: "This need for fairness and allowing for the fortunes of luck led the way to the transfer system, in which the winner of each moto advances to the next round - be it quarter, semi or main event".

=== 1970s ===
In August 1977, Merl Mennenga created the ABA. In 1978, the first ABA National was held in Azusa, California, with 35 tracks and 3,000 participants. Following this in 1979, the ABA became BMX racing's largest governing body.

=== 1980s ===
In 1980, Greg Hill objected to the 1979 season's points scoring. In 1982, the ABA discarded their points system, and the first issue of Bicycles and Dirt was published that September. In 1983, an informal pro-rider boycott began and the BMX Action began an editorial boycott against the ABA.

=== 2000s ===
In 2008, American BMX racers won three medals in Beijing and nine BMX World Cup (Supercross) events. Most of the racers grew up going to ABA tracks. The USA Cycling and the U.S. Olympic Committee collaborated with the ABA to build amateur and elite tracks for Olympic training.

=== 2010s ===
In 2011, the ABA bought the assets of the National Bicycle League (NBL), renaming themselves USA BMX.

=== 2020s ===
In 2022, USA BMX partnered with Stacyc Stability Cycles for the STACYC World Series to assist children aged 3-7 with bicycling. Later in the year, Tulsa-based USA BMX headquarters opened to host events such as the Grand Nationals, representing 46 states and 20 countries.

== Similar organizations ==
The American Bicycle Motocross Association (ABMXA) operated from late 1974 to early 1976. An American Bicycle Association was created in January 1975 by Bob Bailey, but went bankrupt by December 1975 with only 20 paid members. In 1978, the National Bicycle Association (NBA) had 50 tracks and 5,000 racers. BMX Actions boycotted the NBA during the 1980 season. In 1978, the National Bicycle League (NBL) had 18 tracks and about 4,100 riders; it was the sport's first sanctioning body. Other BMX organizations included:

- United States Bicycle Association (USBA)
- United Bicycle Racers Association (UBR; regional)
- National Pedal Sport Association (NPSA; regional)
- United States Bicycle Association (USBA)

== Criticism ==
Complaints about high entry fees and subpar track conditions were lodged against the ABA.

=== BMX Action boycott ===
BMX Action (BMXA) managing editor, publisher, and owner Robert Osborn initiated an editorial boycott of the ABA after he was denied a photographer's pass for the 1980 ABA nationals, and the magazine's coverage of ABA events was limited to brief comments and race results. The drop in coverage resulted in reduced interest in ABA events, which led to a decline in sponsorships and race funding (including the ABA nationals). BMX Action ended its editorial boycott partially due to an agreement with the ABA to stop publishing the association's in-house magazine, Bicycles and Dirt.

=== 1983 pro boycott ===
A pro-rider boycott, led unofficially by Greg Hill and including racers such as Stu Thomsen, was established on the basis of Hill's 1980 allegation that the pro points system was unfair. The pro with the most points was selected to go to the ABA's Grand National competition. Points earned were equal to the amount of money earned that year; the ABA pro who won the most money was declared number one, and the ABA said that revenue-based standings provided an exciting end to a season. Racers called the point systems detrimental to professionals, however, because a consistent season could be undone by a one-off performance. After the 1982 Grand National, the pro and amateur classes were subject to the transfer system for the 1983 season. President Merl Mennenga reportedly told Hill that the "... ABA doesn't cater to the pros."

== Financial problems ==
The ABA also had reduced coverage in other BMX press, including BMX Action's biggest competitors (BMX Plus! and Super BMX). Many ABA nationals coincided with national NBL competitions. In addition to the pro boycott of the ABA nationals, other races were often scheduled on the same weekend as ABA events. The press favored NBL events, leading to a further decrease in coverage. The decrease meant that fewer companies (BMX and non-BMX) purchased advertising and sponsorship spots, and stopped sending their well-funded race teams to ABA events. Most non-sponsored BMX racers stopped attending ABA events due to the lack of press coverage.

=== Bicycles and Dirt (BAD) ===
The ABA's in-house newspaper, ABA Action, did not generate sufficient coverage because it was restricted to the ABA membership. The association tried to create its own magazine, Bicycles and Dirt, to circumvent the established press and attract advertisers. Forgoing a subscription model to attract a larger audience, the ABA first sold BAD on newsstands with Stu Thomsen on the cover. The magazine's financial situation was poor and, to end the editorial boycott by BMX Action, the ABA ceased publication of Bicycles and Dirt with the September 1984 issue.

The rising cost of insurance affected every BMX organization during the early 1980s, and the ABA was particularly vulnerable because of Bicycles and Dirt's financial difficulty. The first indications that BMX's popularity was flattening appeared in 1984, as membership and race attendance declined.

=== Pro Spectaculars ===
In 1984, the drop in popularity of BMX racing was outstripped by the growth of BMX freestyle bicycles. Local track operators noted a decline in beginner-class entries. Attempting to curb its financial losses, the ABA attempted a Pro Spectacular: an event inspired by Motorcycle Motocross (MX) Supercross. Events were held in indoor arenas, with more difficult tracks to appeal to spectators.

The Pro Spectacular events were restricted to professionals and heavily advertised on television. Races were held on Friday nights, and broadcasts were limited to two hours to fit a typical television schedule and audience attention span. Organizers hoped that increased exposure to BMX would spark a surge in beginner classes at the local level. The first ABA Pro Spectacular, held in Reno, Nevada, on January 4, 1985, attracted enough pros for a lively competition (thanks, in part, to the $10,000 purses offered for each race). Spectator attendance, however, was lackluster. Despite a low admission fee, the venues were empty or well below capacity. The first event, at the University of Nevada's 10,000-seat Lawlor Events Centre, attracted only about 2,000 spectators.

Bicycle racing of all types was more popular in Europe and South America, where crowds filled venues and racers were regularly featured in the news. The 1983 International Bicycle Motocross Federation-sanctioned world championship, held in Slagharen, the Netherlands, attracted 15,000 to 20,000 spectators and was broadcast live on European television. A campaign of 68 30-second TV advertisements during popular US programs such as Magnum, P.I., Dynasty and Good Morning America failed to attract comparable North American interest.

=== USBA, resignation, and bankruptcy ===
Rod Keeling, before the ABA, had no experience with BMX racing. He left the ABA on March 2, 1984, and announced the creation of the United States Bicycling Association on March 23 of that year. ABA president Merl Mennenga saw the USBA as a betrayal, and said at a press conference that the rival organization was intended to undermine the ABA.

The ABA had a dispute with the promoters of the 1981 $10,000 Knott's Berry Farm race because it was scheduled opposite the Grand National in Oklahoma City, Oklahoma. The Knott's Berry Farm race, sanctioned by the National Bicycle League, increased animosity between the NBL and the ABA. Mennenga attempted to discourage participation in the Knott's Berry race.

Mennenga thought that the USBA stole ABA membership records to ask ABA racers to join the USBA. A disgruntled spectator filed a false police report that Mennenga had assaulted her. He was arrested during an event and later released when the charges were dropped.

On March 5, 1985, Mennenga announced that he had sold the ABA to Bernie Anderson and Jamie Vargas (two ABA track operators) for $250,000 and had resigned as president. Vargas was a computer consultant who operated Louisiana's first track. Anderson owned a magazine-subscription-sales company and founded Rebel Racing, a regional BMX bicycle company; he also operated Texas' first successful track. Both men had sons who were racers. The new owners installed Walt Ehnat, who had partnered with Gary Ellis Sr. in running four tracks in the Seattle area, as president. They decided to hold the remaining Pro Spectaculars, despite the financial gain of canceling them, to preserve their relationship with the pros. Vargas and Anderson tried to stave off bankruptcy, although bankruptcy protection would have benefited the ABA; the new management feared the optics of bankruptcy for track operators and the USBA. With reported liabilities to twenty creditors of $700,000 to $750,000, however (most attributable to Bicycles and Dirt), they filed for Chapter 11 bankruptcy protection on November 25, 1985. The USBA exploited track operators' concern about the ABA's solvency. Gary Ellis Sr., father of pro racer Gary Ellis, ran the ABA-affiliated River Valley BMX track in Sumner, Washington. Ellis Sr. felt that bankruptcy was good for the ABA, since it removed most of the management which put the association into dire financial straits: "... We basically felt ... well, I basically felt the person that started the USBA was part of the bad managment [sic] of the ABA that put them towards bankruptcy in the first place. You can quote me on that".

Most track operators realized that Chapter 11 protection could be a sound business decision. They knew other companies in the industry that were in the same position as the ABA was but came out of it. The Van Doren Rubber Company, maker of Vans shoes favored by BMX racers, freestylers and skateboarders, had emerged from bankruptcy.

By late 1985, commercial pilots Sims and Cook had left the USBA for flying jobs. Keeling was forced out by USBA investor Ira Hall and replaced with a new management team, including USBA president Walt Ehnat. Ehnat was Keeling's vice president at the USBA, who had replaced Merl Mennenga as ABA president. A few months later, he was fired by the ABA's new management.

=== Possible corporate espionage and buyout ===
Ehnat was replaced as ABA president by BMX track operator and former motorcycle racer Clayton John, and became USBA vice president. Bob Hadley, manager of the Huffy BMX team, noticed that Erhart seemed to be privy to a letter that Hadley had shared with John; Hadley joked that John's office must have been bugged. John took Hadley's joke seriously, and had ABA headquarters swept for bugs by experts in countersurveillance and corporate espionage. Two experts found evidence of tampering in a telephone trunk line leading to John's office; the wires were stripped in a way indicating that a phone had been tapped. Circumstantial evidence suggested that the USBA was responsible.

By early 1986, the ABA was slowly getting back on its financial feet and the USBA was beginning to do poorly. Hall approached the ABA with an unsuccessful plan to buy the association from Anderson and Vargas. The USBA planned to have Mennenga buy the ABA and sell it to the USBA (which would liquidate it under chapter 7 of the bankruptcy code), but nothing came of it. The USBA was ultimately bought out by the ABA.

=== Solvency and expansion ===
On September 24, 1987, a United States bankruptcy court approved the ABA's financial reorganization plan. Professional and amateur champions received promised prizes. The 1988 Grand National in Oklahoma City, with 470 entries, was the largest BMX race in history. In 2002, the ABA unsuccessfully tried to purchase the National Bicycle League from USA Cycling.

== Gold Cup series ==
The ABA's U.S. Gold Cup series was created in 1981. In 2000, as part of a sponsorship agreement with Redline Bicycles, it was renamed the Redline Cup Series until 2014; that year, the series returned to its Gold Cup name. A series of regional championship events primarily for non-sponsored amateur racers, it became a six-race qualifying series in 1982 which was held in conjunction with the nationals. From 1981 to 1987, the series was also known as the Gold Cup East-West Shootout.

From 1989 to 2012, the regions were Western, Central, and Eastern; riders had to compete in the regional finals where they lived, not where they qualified. The regional finals were held in September. In 2007, the Redline Cup season was from January 28 to mid-August.

Since 2016, the Gold Cup series consists of Northeast, Northwest, Southeast, Southwest, North Central, and South Central regions. In each region a racer must have two qualifying Gold Cup races and attend Gold Cup Finals in that respective region to be eligible for a Gold Cup number plate. Sponsors have included DK Bicycles and Tangent Products. The Gold Cup series follows the normal USA BMX season from January 1 to December 15.

== See also ==
- National Bicycle Association
- United States Bicycle Motocross Association
