= BMX racing =

Type of bicycle racing

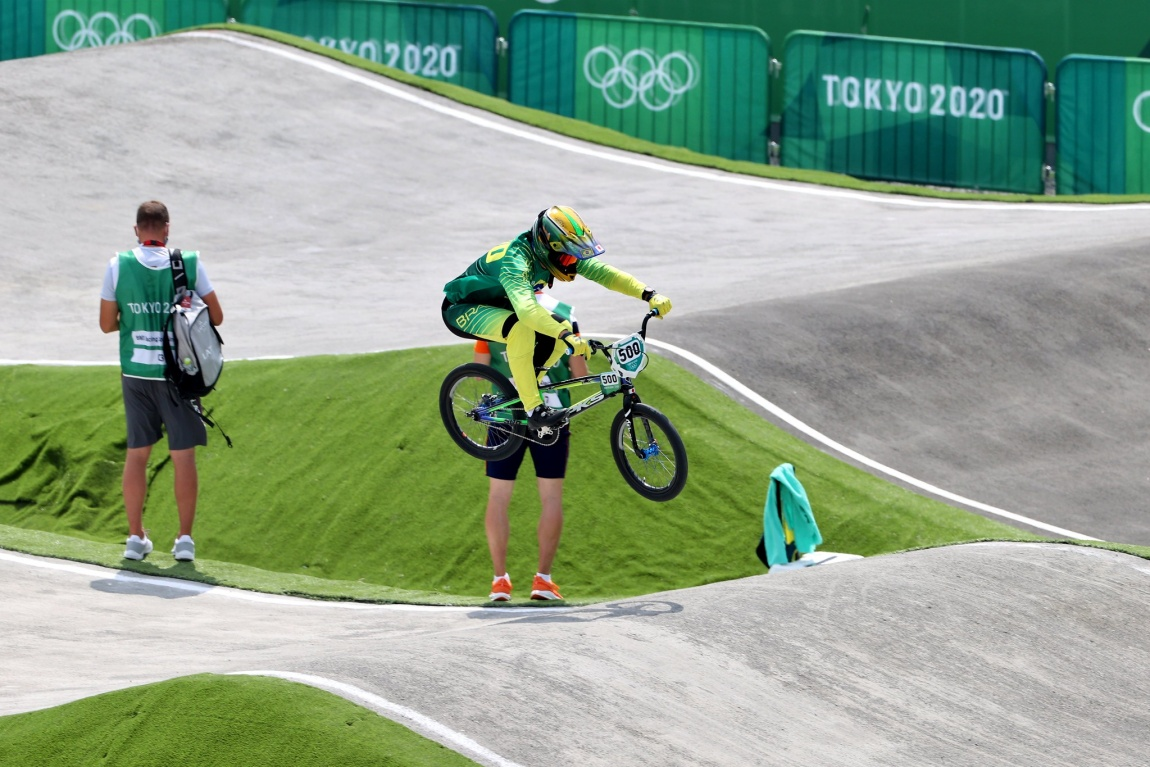
- BMX racer Renato Rezende at the 2020 Summer Olympics in Tokyo, Japan
- Highest governing body: UCI

Characteristics
- Contact: yes
- Team members: Individuals
- Mixed-sex: Yes, separate competitions
- Type: Cycle sport
- Equipment: BMX bike
- Venue: BMX track

Presence
- Country or region: Worldwide
- Olympic: Men's and Women's since the 2008 Olympics

Pictogram for Cycling at the Summer Olympics

BMX racing is a type of bicycle racing which features BMX riders sharing a short single-lap circuit or point-to-point course, with multiple banked corners, jumps and rollers. The format of BMX was derived from motocross racing, and sanctioned internationally by the Union Cycliste Internationale (UCI), facilitated by a number of continental, national and local sanctioning bodies.

== History ==
While informal bicycle racing existed to different extents, it was in Southern California that the sport of BMX started to become organized and resemble the modern sport. Original influencers included Ron Mackler, who was a park attendant in Santa Monica and set up races at Palms Park in West Los Angeles in 1969. Mackler, a teenager with motocross experience helped organize local boys who wanted to race. The first race took place on July 10, 1969. Four years later, in 1973, back-to-back seasons of ten weeks in duration were established with an entrance fee of $4.50. The track ran through the southeast areas of the park with variations in topography; the track remained relatively unchanged through 1980. The latter half of the 1980s marked an evolution in BMX history. The sport split into two major riding categories: racing and freestyle. While racing stayed competitive and fast-paced, freestyle BMX brought a whole new energy—focusing on tricks, flow, and creativity. Street spots, dirt jumps, and skateparks became arenas for expression. Riders like Mat Hoffman and Dave Mirra became global icons, pushing the limits of what BMX bikes could do. In 1995, BMX freestyle joined the X Games, taking the sport to a whole new level of visibility and legitimacy. As global exposure grew, so did participation. BMX found loyal communities across Europe, Asia, Australia, and Latin America. Riders from every corner of the world began innovating and influencing the scene in new ways. In 2008, BMX racing made its Olympic debut in Beijing. A little over a decade later, freestyle BMX also entered the Olympic spotlight at the Tokyo 2020 Games—solidifying BMX as a respected global discipline. Modern BMX bikes are the product of decades of refinement Modern BMX components such as stems, pedals, and grips are now precision-engineered using CNC-machined billet aluminum, offering riders improved durability and performance.. Lightweight, durable, and purpose-built, they come in specialized forms depending on the discipline—racing, street, park, dirt, and flatland. Freestyle bikes emphasize maneuverability and strength, while race bikes focus on aerodynamics and speed. Geometry, materials, tires, and gearing have all evolved, but the goal remains the same: performance with personality. Today, BMX thrives not just in competitions but across social platforms, local scenes, and casual rides. The internet has played a huge role in BMX’s growth, allowing riders to share clips, exchange tips, and inspire others—no matter where they live.

== Bikes sizes ==
There are two BMX racing bikes sizes. The first is the 20-inch (ISO 406mm) wheel bicycle. The 20" wheel bikes are referred to as "Class" bikes, with an outer tire diameter up to 22.5". The second type is "Cruiser" bikes which are any bikes with an outer tire diameter larger than 22.5". The most common cruiser size uses a 24" (ISO 507mm) wheel.

== Advantages ==
While BMX racing is an individual sport, teams are often formed from racers in different classifications for camaraderie and for business exposure of a sponsoring organization or company. BMX racing rewards strength, quickness, and bike handling. Many successful BMX racers have gone on to leverage their skills in other forms of bicycle and motorcycle competitions.

== Track features ==
There are many types of BMX jumps, ranging from small rollers to massive step-up doubles. There are pro straights for professional racers which are doubles that range from about 6 m to 12 m, while "Class" straights have more flow and have many more range of jumps.

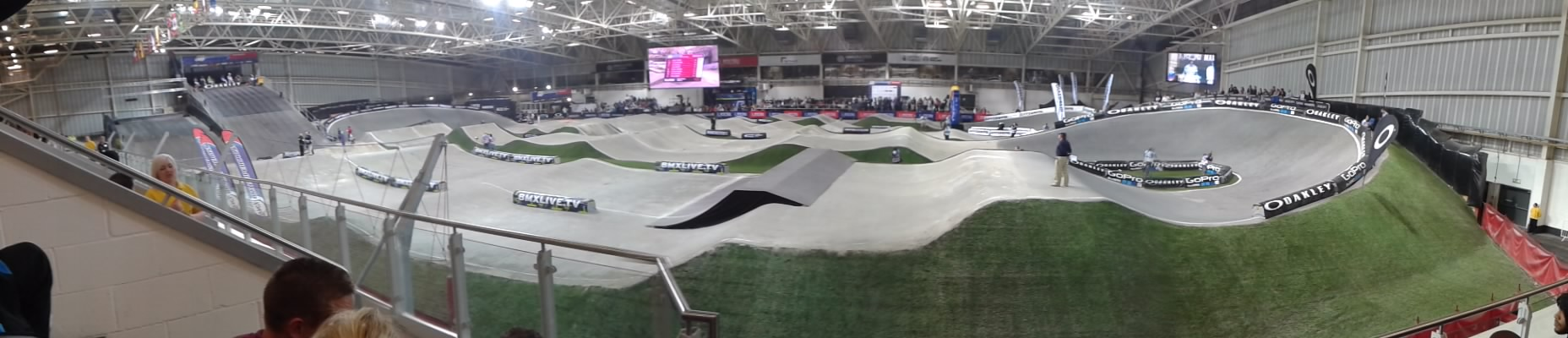
The National Indoor BMX Arena in Manchester, United Kingdom

The Start Gate

The start gate marks the start of the track. Most BMX tracks have a gate. The starting hill will normally provide all the speed for the remainder of the race. Generally, the larger the hill, the faster, so pro hills are much larger than the amateur ones.

Tabletop

A tabletop is a jump where the track is level across between the take-off and landing points. They are especially useful for beginning BMX riders who are still learning how to jump since a too-short jump will land on the level tabletop rather than slamming into the uphill side of the landing hill.

Roller

A small hill, generally too low to be jumped off. Rollers are normally built in groups that are known as rhythm sections because they challenge the riders' ability to maintain speed over the bumps.

Double

A double is a pair of two hills close enough to each other that it is possible to jump between them.

Triple

A triple is a group of three hills close enough together. Common ways riders clear them are by manualing or jumping either the first or second gaps, or by double-manualing the two sequential gaps.

Step-up

A step-up is a double or a tabletop followed by a roller one where the landing point is at a higher elevation than the take-off point.

Step-down

A step-down is just like a step-up, except that the landing point is at a lower elevation than the take-off point.

Berms

Turns which are at an angle. Therefore, one can easily turn without having to brake.

Pro set

A set of jumps with only a takeoff lip and a landing ramp, that is, where a failure to take-off or to jump far enough will either result in being heavily slowed down, or more commonly, crashing.

== Olympics ==
BMX racing became a medal sport at the 2008 Summer Olympics in Beijing under the UCI sanctioning body. BMX racing has appeared in the 2012, 2016, 2020, and 2024 Summer Olympics.

== Sanctioning bodies ==
A sanctioning body is a private (in the United States and most Western Nations) governing body which controls a sport or specific discipline thereof. One or more sanctioning bodies may operate in a sport at any given time, often with subtle rule variations which appeal to regional tastes. They make and enforce the rules, and decide the qualifications and responsibilities of the participants, including the players, owners, and operators of facilities. In legal terms, they are an intermediary between the participants and higher governing bodies such as (in cycling) the Union Cycliste Internationale (UCI) and National Governing Bodies such as USA BMX. Sanctioning bodies mete out discipline and punishments, as well as bestow awards and rankings of their participants.

In the Bicycle Motocross context, sanctioning bodies are chiefly responsible for providing insurance coverage and other "back office" services to local tracks. They also keep points on riders' performance throughout the year, and undertake the production of a national racing series (which is typically 18-22 weekends per year). Riders are permitted to race at the sanctioning body's affiliated tracks and national events via the purchase of an annual membership. As part of their administrative "service provider" role, BMX sanctioning bodies also determine the rules of competition, such as clothing requirements, age and gender divisions (or "classes"), as well as the rules and protocol for advancement in proficiency classes (Novice, Intermediate, Expert, Girl Expert, Cruiser, Girl Cruiser, Vet Pro, Men/Women Junior, and Men/Women Pro.)

BMX Racing has had many sanctioning bodies over its 40-year history as an organized sport, the first being Scot Breithaupt's Bicycle United Motocross Society (BUMS), created in the early 1970s (see below). Since then, there have been dozens of regional, national, and international sanctioning bodies, some of them associated with or owned by another. Most are defunct or have been merged into larger, more successful organizations, but a handful still exist in their original forms.

In the United States, USA BMX is the main sanctioning body which was formed in 2011 from the merger of the two largest organizations, the ABA and NBL.

=== Australia ===
==== Australian Bicycle Motocross Association (ABMXA) ====
Two ABMXA sanctioning bodies that formed in the history of BMX in Australia:

The first one was formed in May 1975 by Bob Smith, an Australian businessman and two of his friends. He open the first BMX track in Australia on May 17, 1975, on the Gold Coast in Tallebudgera, Queensland adjacent to the Tally Valley Golf Club. He had admired BMX through the American magazines his son brought home.

The second ABMXA was formed in April 1981 from three regional Australian BMX organizations: The Victoria BMX Association; (VBMXA), the Queensland BMX Association (QBMXA) and the New South Wales BMX Association (NSWBMXA). It was Australia's representative to the IBMXF in the 1980s.

Currently, the ABMXA is governed by Auscycling, creating mediated and consistent rules and regulations.

==== National Bicycle Association (NBA) ====
The National Bicycle Association was a third, separate Australian sanctioning body. It was formed in December 1981 and had branches in different countries around the world. By the summer of 1982 it had 20,000 members worldwide and 950 members in the Australian states of Victoria and New South Wales. Despite sharing a common name this association had nothing to do with the original United States–based National Bicycle Association that was formed in California in 1974 and ironically merged with the National Bicycle League and ceased operations as an independent body in December 1981, the same month and year the Australian namesake was formed.

==== Bicycle Motocross Australia (BMXA) ====
BMX Australia (BMXA) was the fourth separate Australian sanctioning body for BMX racing in Australia.

AusCycling

AusCyling is the current sanctioning body for BMX racing in Australia.

=== Canada ===
- Cycling Canada Cyclism (CCC)
- BMX Canada

Currently - Cycling Canada https://www.cyclingcanada.ca/ is the Federal Sanctioning body for all Canadian cycling disciplines (including BMX) under the UCI. Some tracks and Provinces have chosen BMX Canada over the Provincial UCI representative. Here are the different choices that are available in Canada,

Alberta - ABA -Alberta BMX Association. https://www.albertabmx.com/

British Columbia - Cycling BC. https://cyclingbc.net/bmx/

Saskatchewan - http://www.saskcycling.ca/BMX.html

Quebec - http://www.fqsc.net/BMX

All Ontario tracks and some BC tracks are sanctioned by an American corporation - USA BMX (also known as ABA) under the assumed name BMX Canada - https://www.bmxcanada.org These tracks run rules separate from the UCI but offer similar race structure and age categorization. BMX Canada offers full support to their affiliated tracks, including point tracking, marketing materials, an in-house magazine and a coaching/retention program. Results from these races run under the USA BMX/BMX Canada name are used in the team selection process for Provincial and National teams.

=== France ===
==== Fédération Française de Bicrossing (FFB) ====
La Fédération Française de Bicrossing, which in English translates to The French Federation of Bicrossing (FFB) was created on March 1, 1978, by Marcelle Seurat, a motorcycle importer and distributor. At first its primary purpose was to promote BMX and its products. On May 17, 1980, it held is first race in Beaune, France. This organization would cease to exist in early 1981 after only acquiring 100 members.

==== Association Française de Bicrossing (AFdB) ====
L'Association Française de Bicrossing, which in English translates to the French Association of Bicrossing (FAB), was founded by Raymond Imbert, Rene Nicolas, Denis Mourier, Bernard Nicolas, Fabrice Pérez, Gerard Hinault and Pascal Giboulot on March 1, 1981.

==== Fédération Française de Cyclisme (FFC) ====
On January 1, 1990, the AFdB joined the FFC. On March 4, 1993, BMX was recognized as an important sport by the French Ministry for sports. Today the official French BMX Sanctioning body is now the Fédération Française de Cyclisme (FFC), or in English the French Cycling Federation (FCF). It has almost 10,000 members.

=== Italy ===
==== Associazione Italiana BMX (A.I.BMX) ====
The Associazione Italiana BMX, which in English translates to Italian BMX Association, was founded in December 1981 by Aldo Gandolfo, an Italian journalist and sport promoter. In 1983 the A.I.BMX joined the I.BMX.F. and held the first official Italian BMX race. In 1984, the A.I.BMX held the first Italian international race in Pinerolo and organized the first Italian participation in European Championships. In 1985 Galdolfo left the Association, which was refounded with a new statute and a new board of directors. In 1988 the A.I.BMX concluded an agreement with the UISP in order to unify their respective national championships and in 1989 ceased the activity.

==== Unione Italiana Sport per Tutti (UISP) ====
The Unione Italiana Sport per Tutti, which in English translates to Italian Sport For All Association, is an amateur sport association which conducted an official BMX racing activity from 1985 to 1990, mainly developed in Piedmont and Emilia-Romagna. In 1988 concluded an agreement with the A.I.BMX in order to unify their respective national championships and in 1991 ceased the BMX activity.

==== Federazione Ciclistica Italiana ====
The Federazione Ciclistica Italiana (FCI), which in English translates to Italian Cycling Federation, is the national governing body of cycle racing in Italy and started conducting official BMX activity in 1984. It was a big promoter of BMX racing within the Fédération Internationale Amateur de Cyclisme (FIAC) and in 1985 held the first FIAC World Championship in Jesolo (near Venice). Every year the FCI organize the National Championship (held in a single race normally on the first Sunday of July) and a season-long competition called Circuito Italiano BMX (seven rounds in 2008, with the same point system as the UEC European Championship) open to Italian and foreign riders.

=== Japan ===
- Japan Bicycle Motocross Association (JBA)

=== Netherlands ===
==== Stichting Fietscross Nederland (SFN) ====
The first sanctioning body in the Netherlands was called the Stichting Fietscross Nederland (SFN) (in English the Dutch Bicycle Motocross Foundation (DBMXF)) and was co-founded on October 19, 1978, by Gerrit Does and Louis Vrijdag. It held its first race on April 21, 1979. In December 1980 it was folded into the KNWU (see below) but a second incarnation was created in 1987 called the Stichting Fietscross Promotie Nederland (the Dutch BMX Promotion Foundation) to promote Dutch racing in the Netherlands. This second "SFN" was dissolved in 1997.

==== Koninklijke Nederlandsche Wielren Unie (KNWU) ====
On December 16, 1980, the SFN was integrated into the Koninklijke Nederlandsche Wielren Unie (KNWU) (in English the Royal Dutch Cycling Federation (RDCF)), the Dutch cycling sanctioning body that was the governing body for all types of cycling and represents the Netherlands as a member of the UCI.

==== Nederlandse Fietscross Federatie (NFF) ====
Some of the then-existing local tracks in 1980 did not become a member of the KNWU. Operating for a while independently, they formed another sanctioning body in 1987, the Nederlandse Fietscross Federatie (NFF), (in English the Dutch Bicycle Motocross Federation (DBMXF)).

Both organizations function as sanctioning bodies for BMX racing.

=== New Zealand ===
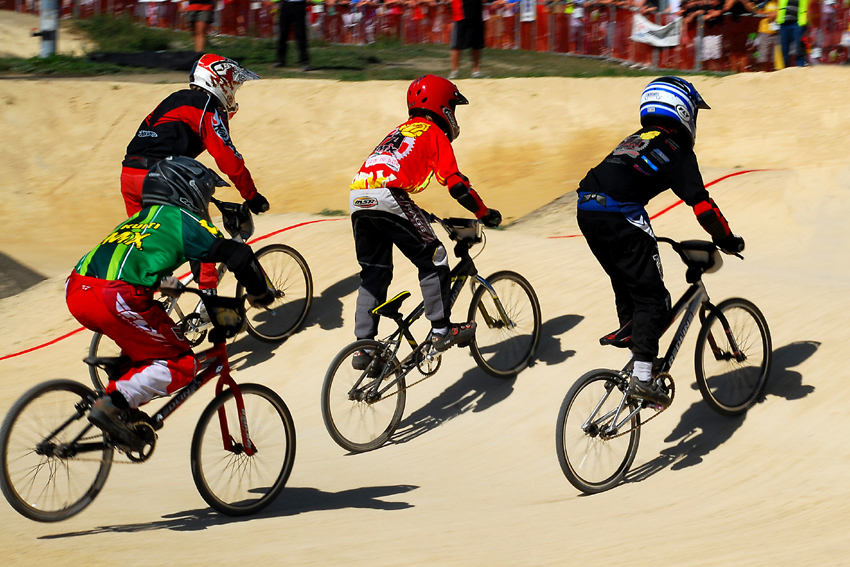
BMX 2008 Nationals held in the Christchurch suburb of Bexley

- BMX New Zealand Incorporated (BMXNZ) is the recognised National Sporting Organisation (NSO) for BMX racing in New Zealand. It is a founding Member Organisation of Cycling New Zealand (CNZ) the National Federation for cycling in New Zealand. BMXNZ has a membership of 32 clubs (as of January 2017) based in seven regions.

=== United Kingdom ===
==== United kingdom bicycle motocross association (UKBMXA) ====
The UKBMXA was created in April 1980 by David Duffield as first as a way of promoting BMX in England. On August 30, 1980, it held its first BMX race in Redditch, England.
This sanctioning body would later become affiliated with the IBMXF and represent England in the IBMXF sanctioned events including the European and World Championships.
In the summer of 1985 it merged with the National Bicycle Motocross Association (NBMXA) with the UKBMXA being the dominant partner with its name carrying on.

==== National Bicycle Motocross Association (NBMXA) ====
The National Bicycle Motocross Association was a British sanctioning body headquartered in Ashton in Makersfield, Wigan England.

==== English Bicycle Association (EBA) ====
In November 1989 UKBMX Association (UKBMXA) and the British BMX Association (BBMXA) merged and formed the English Bicycle Association (EBA). This combination would represent England in the IBMXF.

==== British Cycling ====
The EBA merged with the British Cycling Federation (BCF) which had represented all other aspects and disciplines of English bicycle racing other than BMX. This organization is now known as British Cycling. British Cycling now represents all aspects of sport cycling in the United Kingdom including BMX within the UCI.

It is not to be confused with the now-defunct United States–based National Bicycle Motocross Association (NBmxA) (1972–1981) that was formerly known as the National Bicycle Association (NBA) and was the first BMX sanctioning body in the world. The British NBMXA ceased operations in the summer of 1985.

=== United States ===
On July 10, 1969, a group of boys riding their Schwinn Sting-Ray bicycles in Palms Park in West Los Angeles wanted to race. A park attendant, Ronald Mackler, a teenager with motorcycle motocross (MX) experience, helped them organize. Palms Park became to BMX as Elysian Fields is to American baseball, for at that moment Bicycle Motocross racing was born. By 1973, entrance fees of US$4.50 (which included a US$1.00 insurance fee for the year) for a 10-week season of Thursday-night racing was charged, and the top three racers in the season were given trophies. Then a new season of 10 weeks would start the following Thursday.

The track operated well into the 1980s largely unchanged;, including the lack of a modern starting gate.

==== Bicycle United Motocross Society (BUMS) ====
The first BMX proto sanctioning body was the Bicycle United Motocross Society (BUMS) founded by Scot Breithaupt in Long Beach, California on November 14, 1970, when he was fourteen years old. On that day he put on his first ad hoc BMX race. At first BUMS simply referred to the transients that congregated in the field around 7th and Bellflower Streets where the track was located, but later Scot turned it into the acronym BUMS. The first race had 35 participants, who paid Scot a quarter (US25 cents) each for the privilege. At the next race 150 kids participated.

Since Scot was a motorcycle racer, he knew even at thirteen the importance of a sanctioning body and how races were run and organized. He used his personal trophies that he won racing motocross motorcycles as awards for the winning competitors. He gave out membership cards, wrote the rulebook, and had a points system for scoring and proficiency level promotion. He ran the first state championship in 1972, when he was 16 years old. Due to his racing experience, he knew how to lay out a course more challenging than present day courses. The track was about 1,350 feet (410 m) long and much more demanding than today's typical BMX course. It was more akin to what the professionals race on in special Pro sections of track at large events today, including water holes and high dropoffs. This early track resembled more closely a shortened mountain biking course than today's BMX tracks. With the aforementioned exception of pro sections, today's tracks are tame by comparison due to insurance concerns by the sanctioning bodies. Thus, The National Bicycle League banned double jumps in 1988.

This first structured sanctioning body would eventually grow to seven tracks in California. This is what made him different from other track operators at the time: he did not just start one track but several others under a single jurisdiction of rules and regulations, all the requirements of a sanctioning body.

Among the firsts credited to BUMS was the first professional race in 1975 at Saddleback Park with a US$200 purse. Breithaupt also promoted in a joint venture with the new National Bicycle Association (NBA) (which was established the year before) what would later be called "Nationals" with the Yamaha Bicycle Gold Cup series in 1974. They were three separate qualifying races held at three separate tracks in California sponsored and heavily promoted by Yamaha Motor Company Ltd. to decide the first "National" No. 1 racer at a fourth and final race at the Los Angeles Coliseum. It was an achievement of import in the infancy of BMX, but it was not a true national since virtually all the events were held in California and almost all racers were Californians. It would be left for other innovators to create a true national event.

==== National Bicycle Association (NBA) ====
Many followed Ronald Mackler, Rich Lee and Scot Breithaupt, opening impromptu often short-lived tracks sometimes within preexisting Motorcycle Motocross tracks; but with the exception of Breithaupt, the operators were independent "organizations" that operated individual tracks without any cohesion. What was needed was a governing body that would standardize and give direction and purpose to the grab bag of these amateur-run (in that these operators did not have this enterprise as the main concern of their lives) tracks.

The first official BMX sanctioning body was the National Bicycle Association (NBA) started by Ernie Alexander in 1972. Like Scot Breithaupt, he had motorcycle motocross in his background, and like Scot he was a promoter but a professional one with his American Cycle Enterprises (ACE). He was also a former Hollywood stunt man who promoted races at the famous Indian Dunes, built and managed by Walt James, where many movies and TV shows were filmed. In 1970 he noticed a group of kids trying to organize a bicycle race with their Schwinn Sting-Rays. Being familiar with motorcycle racing, he lent the kids a hand. He later opened the Yarnell track, a steep downhill course every bit as treacherous by today's standards as Scot Breithaupt's BUMS track—if not more so. In 1972 he created the National Bicycle Association, modeled on the existing American Motorcycle Association (AMA). It was Mr. Alexander who built a truly nation-spanning professional sanctioning body for BMX.

Mismanagement irreparably damaged its reputation, including such practices as not reporting points totals in time, running races late and behind schedule, deliberately scheduling its own events opposite the events of other sanctioning bodies to weaken their attendance, and a less-than-attentive attitude to members. In its last two years it went through a name change to National BMX Association (NBmxA) in 1979. It tried to reorganize in 1981, starting new tracks and by most accounts had a spark of new energy and enthusiasm, but still suffered lack of ridership (racers were committed to other point races with the other sanctioning bodies). This was to no avail. The NBA, suffering financial difficulties, ceased sanctioning its own races and started joint operations and did merge its membership (but did not merge its management) with the NBL after the 1981 season.

Mr. Alexander did try at least one more foray into the sport he helped to pioneer: he started the World Wide Bicycle Motocross Association (WWBMXA) in Chatsworth, California in 1981. Unfortunately it did not last more than two racing seasons.

==== National Bicycle League (NBL) ====
The National Bicycle League (NBL), a nonprofit organization, was started in 1974 by George Edward Esser (September 17, 1925 – August 31, 2006). It was originally based in Pompano Beach, Florida, in the US, but ultimately moved its headquarters is located in Hilliard, Ohio. George Esser was exposed to BMX by his son Greg Esser, who was famous within the sport and one of the sport's earliest superstars and first professionals. Like Ernie Alexander and Scot Breithaupt before him, he was a promoter who created the NBL as the BMX auxiliary to the National Motorcycle League (NML), now-defunct, when he became dissatisfied with how the races were run.

The NBL expanded rapidly on the East Coast of the United States and for most of its early history it had only a few tracks west of the Mississippi River. That changed in 1982 when it inherited the membership and tracks of the defunct National Bicycle Association (NBA) which had ceased sanctioning its own races and went into partnership with the NBL. The NBL acquired all the NBA tracks in the nation including all those west of the Mississippi. As a result, it became a nation-spanning sanctioning body like the ABA.

In 1997 the NBL joined USA Cycling, a sanctioning body that has long supported road race, mountain biking and other cycling disciplines in the United States, tracing its roots back to 1920. The resulting organization was the National Federated body that represents cycling in the United States. USA Cycling is part of the Union Cycliste Internationale (UCI) also known as UCI Cycling, the Switzerland-based international governing body that oversees virtually all aspects of cycling around the world (see International Sanctioning bodies below).

The NBL had a previous association with the UCI through its affiliations with the defunct NBL sister organization, the International Bicycle Motocross Federation (IBMXF), which was also co-founded by Mr. Esser. The UCI absorbed IBMXF in 1993 through its amateur cycling division, Fédération Internationale Amateur de Cyclisme (FIAC), which in the prior five years held joint World Championships for BMX with the IBMXF (See International Sanctioning bodies below).

On May 17, 2011, the NBL announced that a letter of agreement was signed and approved by their Board of Directors, to merge operations with the ABA. The merged organization would be controlled by ABA ownership, and would be called USA BMX. After a month of negotiation between the parties, the final documents were signed on June 18, 2011. That day was the first time in more than 35 years that the sport of BMX Racing was run under a single sanctioning body in North America. The following week, the NBL Midwest National in Warsaw, Indiana was the first event to be run under the USA BMX banner (though was still an NBL-branded event, as part of their 2011 national series). The 2011 NBL Grand National was the final NBL race to be held, held September 3–4, 2011 and dubbed "The Grand Finale."

==== American Bicycle Association (ABA) ====
The American Bicycle Association (ABA), created by Gene Roden and Merl Mennenga in 1977, originated in Chandler, Arizona, USA. As the NBA was declining, the ABA inherited many of its tracks and members making the ABA (within two years) the largest and the first nation-spanning sanctioning body. It was the ABA which introduced the "Direct Transfer System" that shortened the duration of race events. The ABA also started the team trophy concept to award trophies and prizes to the bicycle shop and factory teams with the best race results over a season. It was also the first to install electronic gates for its starting line with "Christmas tree" style lights (reminiscent of drag racing), to ensure fair starts. The ABA also established the BMX Hall of Fame, now called the National BMX Hall of Fame, which recognizes the pioneers and industry visionaries of the sport.

It was the largest sanctioning body in the world (a position it won as early as 1979 when it surpassed the NBL and the old NBA in numbers) with an estimated 60,000 members and 272 affiliated tracks in the United States, Mexico, and Canada. It was technically an international organization, but did not bill itself as one, based on its mandate to grow BMX in the United States, unlike its predecessor, the International Bicycle Motocross Association (IBMX), and its chief early rival, the NBA, both of which had international aspirations.

The ABA brand was retired at the close of the 2011 season, becoming USA BMX as part of its merger with the rival National Bicycle League (NBL).

==== USA BMX ====
USA BMX was formed in 2011 from the merger of the ABA and NBL organizations (with ABA taking control) and is the current sanctioning body for BMX racing in the United States. As the sport has grown in the United States and Internationally, BMX racing has evolved with new rules, classes, and competition. A consolidated governing body had become a necessity to solidify BMX racing as a recognized cycling sport both nationally and internationally.

==== Other notable American sanctioning bodies ====
Along with the majors and pioneers, there were other BMX governing bodies, both national and regional. Among them were the Bicycle Motocross League (BMXL); the United Bicycle Racers Association (UBR) (1977–1983); the United States Bicycle Motocross Association (USBA) (1984–1986), which merged with the ABA at the end of the 1986 racing season after financial trouble made it unsustainable; the International Cycling Association (ICA), which was started in part by professional racer Greg Hill in 1990; and the Southeast Region-based National Pedal Sport Association (NPSA) (1975–1988). These organizations have all ceased to exist.

== International sanctioning bodies ==
=== International Bicycle Motocross Federation (IBMXF) ===
The International Bicycle Motocross Federation (IBMXF) was founded on April 3, 1981, by Gerrit Does, a former motocross racer and Dutch citizen. He introduced BMX to the Netherlands in 1974 after seeing it in the United States. He also started the first European BMX sanctioning body the Stichting Fietscross Nederland (SFN) (the Dutch Bicycle Motocross Foundation (DBMXF) in English) in the Netherlands in 1978. George Esser, the same man who founded the American-based National Bicycle League (NBL) in 1974 was the co-founder of the IBMXF, after Mr. Does approached the NBL to begin preparations for the new body in December 1980 with the representatives of sanctioning bodies from Canada, Colombia, Japan, Panama, and Venezuela as well as representing his native the Netherlands. The IBMXF was a Waalre, the Netherlands-based body that conducted international events including its own World Championship event until its formal merger with the Union Cycliste Internationale (UCI) amateur cycling division the Fédération Internationale Amateur de Cyclisme (FIAC) in 1996 to form the largest international sanctioning body. The UCI championships have since superseded the old IBMXF championships and unlike the old FIAC BMX championships it has a pro class. The NBL was affiliated with the UCI through its previous ties with the IBMXF and its merger with the FIAC.

In the old days of the IBMXF, when riders raced an IBMXF sanctioned race, they received NBL state points and points that went toward trheir international standing, but no national NBL points that counted toward contention for national number one plates. The World Championship title was open to 16 & over Experts and older amateurs in the 20" class as well as Pros in the 20" class. There is a class in European BMX called Superclass. In this class, which is ahead of Expert and the last step before going pro, amateurs race for and win money, an odd contradiction of the generally accepted definition of amateur. However, no racer in Superclass could win more than US$200 per event and keep their amateur standing. This class has been carried over in the UCI after the merger with the IBMXF. In the United States IBMXF affiliate the NBL, Superclass is the equivalent of the old "B" pro class and "A" pro is now called the Elite as per UCI practice. However, for the first few years the IBMXF while there was a pro class, the professionals did not race for money but trophies just like the amateurs and the prestige of being declared World Champions with its associate side benefits in marketing. It was not until 1987 did the pro race for award purses at the IBMXF World Championships.

Among the European standards of racing the IBMXF observed is the rule that racers must stay within their lanes until 25 feet (7.6 m) out of the gate. This is to prevent racers from throwing elbows at each other and to eliminate major crashes before they even get to the first jump. However, on tracks with short straights those who must start from the outside lanes are at a serious disadvantage since they cannot begin moving inside to shorten the distance before the first turn. As a result, many races could be won or lose by lane assignment even before the race begins.

In the first year of the IBMXF World Championship in 1982 after having standard racers decide the World Champions in the various Classes, both Amateur and Professional, an overall World Champion was decided by racing all of the class winners including the Pro Champion and Amateur champion in a single race called the Trophy Dash. In 1982, Greg Hill, the professional World Champion refused to race the Amateur World Champion the American Nelson Chanady, claiming that there was no point to it. Nelson Chanady raced and won the Trophy Dash without Hill's participation, capturing the Overall title. However, since Mr. Hill did not race, the World Championship title lost a considerable amount of luster, since American professional racers were regarded collectively as the best in the world with Mr. Hill being among the best of them. Because of this loss of stature due to Mr. Hill not racing that final race in 1982, the Trophy Dash to determine the World Champion was abolished and in 1983 when the American professional Clint Miller won the World Professional Championship he was also considered the overall World Champion.

On January 1, 1993, the IBMXF and the Fédération Internationale Amateur de Cyclisme (FIAC), the amateur governing branch of the Union Cycliste Internationale (UCI) which handled Olympic Cycling, merged formally after having held joint World Championships since July 22, 1991 in Sandness, Norway (FIAC had been holding its own separate BMX World Championships starting 1986). After a further three year transition time in which the European and World Championships where credited as "IBMXF/FIAC" the UCI held its first official BMX World Championship in 1996 in England. It has continued to hold BMX European and World Championships ever since.

=== Fédération Internationale Amateur de Cyclisme (FIAC) ===
The Fédération Internationale Amateur de Cyclisme (FIAC) which in English stands for International Amateur Cycling Federation, which was based in Rome, Italy, was the amateur cycling arm of the UCI. It had direct ties to the International Olympic Committee (IOC). It had no professional division. That was the purview of its professional counterpart based in Luxembourg, the Fédération Internationale de Cyclisme Professionnel (FICP), also operated by the UCI. However, a class of paid amateurs called the Superclass is allowed even though it may contradict the accepted notions of what an amateur is. However, members of the Supercross class could not win more than US$200 per event and keep their amateur standing. In any case, with the allowance of professionals in the Olympics this has largely become a moot point. USA Cycling, formerly the United States Cycling Federation (USCF) as it was known at the time, was the American affiliate of FIAC. However, it did not have a BMX division at this time. The NBL worked through the then independent IBMXF. Today after purchasing the NBL USA Cycling the NBL represents BMX in the UCI through USA Cycling.

FIAC started holding its own BMX World Championships in 1984. At the time the IBMXF and FIAC were two separate International sanctioning bodies that both held BMX World Championships. However, the IBMXF's was far more prestigious, professionally competently run and established than FIAC. This was because FIAC refused help from either the IBMXF and the American for profit American Bicycle Association (then as now only one non-profit BMX sanctioning body per nation is recognized by the UCI as representing BMX in a nation. In the United States's case, it was and is the NBL), both far more experienced at the time in running BMX races. In some nations, if riders race in the IBMXF circuit (see above), they could not race in the FIAC circuit and vice versa, akin to not being allowed to race in NBL if they raced the ABA circuit, if they had such rules in America. FIAC had odd (to Americans) conventions and rules in conducting races, most likely grafted on from road racing in which was FIAC's only experience. For instance, racing three times to determine average positions in the motos to advance the best four riders to the next stage in racing, something Americans were familiar if they raced NBL. If the class was big enough, riders raced the eighths, quarters and semis, also three times, and the best racers qualified for the Main. Main qualifiers had to race the Main five times to find the final ranking of racers. In the US only the Professionals in the 20" class raced the Main multiple times and only three times at that in either the ABA or NBL. If anything this put a premium on consistency and lowered the luck factor to a bare minimum. However, it was very time-consuming, even at races scheduled over two days.

For a sanctioning body then new to BMX, it was pretty efficient in terms of running an event (taking into consideration the multiple qualifying runs). However, because of its inexperience it was plagued with tracks of inferior quality, both in terms of difficulty, they were deemed far too easy for venues of an international event; and the building materials used, for example during the 1988 Championships in Mol, Belgium the track was built out of white sand, which became particularly boggy in the turns. "It feels like riding on the beach" was a refrain from many American racers. This inexperience of track construction was rectified by 1991 when the FIAC and the IBMXF started holding combined World Championship series in 1991 after four years of holding separate championship events. The two bodies formally unified in 1993 (FICP was disbanded along with the FIAC by the UCI). After a three-year transition period, The UCI held its first World Championship in 1996 after absorbing the IBMXF and abolishing FIAC. With the increasing relaxation of the rules of Professionalism in the IOC, the merged governing body, run directly by the UCI, retained the professional division.

=== Union Cycliste Internationale (UCI) ===
The Union Cycliste Internationale (UCI) or in English the International Cycling Union, is a Switzerland-based international sanctioning body created in 1900 which has had its own international BMX racing program since 1982 (through FIAC) and have been holding BMX World Championships for BMX racing since 1996. The UCI also supports Mountain Bike, Track, Road Race Cycling, and Cyclo-Cross. The UCI through its amateur division FIAC, held championships were separate and distinct from the International Bicycle Motocross Federation (IBMXF) World Championships until they started to hold the World Championships jointly starting in 1991 (see above). The American sanctioning body the National Bicycle League (NBL) was affiliated with the UCI via the old IBMXF which the NBL was a part of. With the merger of the IBMXF with FIAC, they in turn being folded into the UCI, and the NBL joining the USA Cycling directly, the NBL was affiliated with the UCI from 1996 to 2008. After the ABA and NBL merger and founding of USA BMX in 2011, USA Cycling maintained the UCI affiliation with USA BMX handling logistics for UCI races at American BMX tracks. USA BMX riders who race in a UCI qualifying event in the United States may use their USA BMX membership to do so, but USA BMX riders participating in UCI events outside of North America, at UCI Finals, or the Olympics must buy an international race license from USA Cycling.

== General rules of advancement in organized BMX racing ==
To advance a racer must win 10 races as a Novice to advance to Intermediate. Upon winning 20 races (or 10 as a girl) in the Intermediate class the rider will move to Expert, the highest non-Pro class. Boys and girls are combined and race together in Novice and Intermediate classes; at the Expert level boys and girls are separated into Expert and Girls Expert. Any rider can request to be moved into a different class (typically to advance) regardless of number of wins, but upon doing so the rider cannot reclass again or return to their former class for one year. Cruiser and Girls Cruiser have no advancement and are only separated by age.

=== Skill levels, race structure, qualifying methods, awards ===
For North Americans racing with USA BMX (or affiliate BMX Canada) racers in the 20" class are grouped with others of the same relative age and experience levels; Novice, Intermediate, Expert, Girls Expert, Vet Pro, Men Pro, and Women Pro. The Veteran, A Pro, AA Pro, Rookie, B Pro (Superclass) and A Pro (Elite) classes were retired or renamed upon either the 2011 ABA-NBL merger or prior to the 2021 BMX racing season. Cruiser classes are not divided into skill classes, only age classes.

The UCI structure is divided by age classes and lacks the skill levels such as novice and intermediate; rather 7 year-olds will ride with 7 year-olds regardless of experience level. UCI pro racing classes are Men/Women Junior, Men/Women U23 (Under 23), and Men/Women Elite.

There are two main types of races; the Transfer System, and the Total Points System. Note that 8 riders are the maximum number of riders per moto. If more than 8 riders of the same age and skill are present multiple motos will be run to determine the final 8 riders who will race for placement, i.e. 1st, 2nd, 3rd, etc., etc.

In a Transfer System race the racer will ride in qualifying rounds, called motos (called heats in other types of racing) to determine the number of racers in the finals which are called Mains. The sizes and number of motos at a skill level and age group is determined by the number of racers who register for that race and in their respective skill level and age group. Usually a racer gets two chances (sometimes three) to qualify. In a transfer race the top finishers in the qualifying motos are transferred directly to the Main depending on the size of the class. The last place racers do not qualify (DNQ) and therefore do not race in the Main.

In the Total Points System a racer must race three times and is scored on their respective places for the three motos. The scoring formula (rider's three finishes added together) combines the rider's finishing place in their class for each round. The lower the points total determines the rider's placement or advancement. A rider finishing the three motos in 2nd, 3rd, and 2nd place would have a score of 7; a rider in the same class finishing 1st, 4th, and 1st would have a score of 6, effectively beating the rider with 7 points. This same formula is used to determine which riders would proceed to quarter, semi, and final events if there were more than eight riders present.

Currently the UCI, and Olympics, use the Total Points System. USA BMX allowed the use of both Transfer and Total Points depending on the racing event and track operator's discretion. Starting in 2025, USA BMX no longer will use the Transfer System for motos with 8 or less riders; these motos will use Total Points.

=== Local Points Awards and District Ranking ===
The racer's home state/province may be divided up into several districts depending how many participants and how spread out they are over the state/province.

Riders are awarded points depending on their respective finish in the race, which are added to their cumulative totals, and ultimately determining district rankings at the end of the calendar year. The number of points a racer gets after a race is determined by his place in the Main in a Transfer Race, or overall score in a Total Points race. The skill level class also determines how many points are awarded. First place in an Expert class will get 100 points while the first place Intermediate will get 50 points; and the first place Novice gets 25 points. Second, third et al. placers get lower points in proportion.

In all classes and skill levels racers also receive points depending on how many are in their class and age group. These are called participant points. For instance if eight riders participate, all those in that race will get 8 points added to their placing points.

There are separate point scoring for cruiser classes, and separate point tables for state and national rankings.

=== National and special event points awards ===
To compete on a nationwide level (National or National Age Group), a racer must compete in races called Nationals. Riders compete in their age and skill groups and receive points toward a National ranking and title. The National rankings are amongst all racers regardless of their age or skill competing in Nationals events. The National Age Group rankings are against all the riders in a respective age group regardless of skill competing in Nationals events. Nationals have their own points tables that are accumulated by the racers similarly to local district points. Just like in local races he or she is also awarded participant (rider) points. Professionals are not affected since they have their own points system and table separate from the amateurs.

There is yet another points table for Regional, State, and Provincial race series. Riders compete against their age and skill group only, therefore there could be multiple #1 number plates awarded in a state level race series. Currently the regional race series in the United States is called Gold Cup, and is separated into commonly grouped national regions, i.e. Northwest, Midwest, Southeast, etc.

There is also UCI BMX Racing World Championships (Worlds) which is for amateur BMX'ers across the globe. Qualifying races are held in multiple countries with the Finals race location in pre-determined country. Each country sends a set number of qualifying riders who then race as their country's team. Worlds competition follows UCI amateur classes and race format. UCI BMX Racing World Cup is a separate UCI race series open to professional BMX riders only.

=== Open Events ===
Another class of racing in BMX which are typically only held at national events are called Opens. Opens are a chance for riders to test themselves and practice against better competition without jeopardizing their point standings. Nationals events are often large and riders may wait hours between motos. Opens allow them more track time. They must be registered to race in a points race to sign up for the Open events. No points are awarded for Opens although the moto qualification rounds are similar to the point races. These are races with more flexible skill level and age requirements. In Opens there are no Novice, Intermediate and Expert divisions. All amateur skill levels are free to participate. The age groupings are generally broader, for example 13-14 open class as opposed to 13 Intermediate and 14 Intermediate being separate groupings for those ages in the points races.

=== Professionals ===
There are professional rankings in BMX. The Professionals are the only class allowed to compete for cash prizes.

To become a pro, a rider has to be at least 17 years old. A professional BMX'er with another BMX sanctioning body will be recognized as a Pro by USA BMX. In UCI BMX racing the professional class is called Elite.

Since the 2021 racing season, USA BMX Pro Series races only offer 3 categories of professional racing: Men Pro, Women Pro, and Vet Pro (minimum age of 30).

== Examples of notable BMX racers ==
Many participants in BMX racing have left their mark. Most are racers, while some promoted and sponsored races; others have created maneuvers, invented or helped design equipment, and raced themselves. They have done so over the near 40-year history of the sport during distinct eras. These are a few of them.

Pioneering "Old School"* BMX racers from the US include:

- Scot Breithaupt
- David Clinton
- John George
- Bobby Encinas
- Tinker Juarez
- Perry Kramer
- Stu Thomsen
- Jeff Bottema
- Jeff Kosmala
- Jeff Ruminer
- Scott Clark
- Frank Post
- Anthony Sewell
- Brent Patterson
- Brian Patterson
- Harry Leary
- Tommy Brackens
- Eric Rupe
- Pete Loncarevich
- Cheri Elliott
- Richie Anderson
- Debbie Kalsow
- Clint Miller
- Donny Atherton
- Darrell Young
- Andy Patterson
- Eddy King
- Mike King
- Gary Ellis
- Deanna Edwards
- Tim Judge
- Mike Miranda
- Lee Medlin
- Shawn Texas
- Nelson Chanady
- Mike Poulson
- Toby Henderson
- Shelby James
- D.D. Leone

US "Mid school" racers and racers whose careers started during the "Old School" era but were not part of the pioneering 1970's generation include:

- Charles Townsend
- Terry Tenette
- Darwin Griffin
- Eric Carter
- Billy Griggs
- Steve Veltman
- John Purse
- Kiyomi Waller
- Melanie Cline
- Kenny May
- Danny Nelson
- Matt Hadan
- Cindy Davis
- Alan Foster
- Brian Foster
- Gary DeBacker
- Tara Llanes
- Robert MacPherson

Notable international Old and "Mid School"* BMX racers:

- Corine Dorland Netherlands
- Thomas Allier France
- Kelvin Batey Ireland
- Bas de Bever Netherlands
- Christophe Lévêque France
- Dale Holmes UK
- Anne-Caroline Chausson France

Each racer is sourced on his/her individual page.
Newer "Mid School" and "New/Current School"* racers include:

- Mariana Pajón Colombia
- Jamie Lilly US
- Bubba Harris US
- Wade Bootes Australia
- Kim Hayashi US
- Shanaze Reade UK
- Randy Stumpfhauser US
- Samantha Cools Canada
- Willy Kanis Netherlands
- Donny Robinson US
- Kyle Bennett US
- Warwick Stevenson Australia
- Robert de Wilde Netherlands
- Alice Jung US
- Joey Bradford US
- Laëtitia Le Corguillé France
- Jill Kintner US
- Māris Štrombergs Latvia
- Mike Day US
- Carlos Ramírez Colombia
- Alise Post US
- Kamren Larsen US
- Barry Nobles US
- Connor Fields US
- Joris Daudet France

*Generally speaking, the "Old School" era is from 1970 to 1988; "Mid School" from 1988 to 1999; "New/Current School" from 2000 to the present day. Note these years are not wholly definitive for each era and should be considered close approximations.

== National American sanctioning body number one racers by year ==
=== National Bicycle Association (NBA) ===
CDNE=Class did not exist. TDNE=Title did not exist.

Note: Dates reflect the year the racers *won* their plates, not the year they actually *raced* their No.1 plates. In other words, David Clinton won his No.1 plate in 1974 entitling him to race with #1 on his plate for the 1975 season. John George then won the No.1 plate in 1975 and raced with #1 on his plate during the 1976 racing season.

Pro* Nat.#1 Men

- 1974 David Clinton*
- 1975 John George*
- 1976 Scot Breithaupt**
- 1977 Stu Thomsen
- 1978 Stu Thomsen
- 1979 Scott Clark
- 1980 Anthony Sewell
- 1981 Scott Clark

Pro Cruiser Nat.#1 Men

- 1980 Jeff Kosmala
- 1981 Turnell Henry

Amat. Nat.#1 Men

- 1974 David Clinton*
- 1975 John George*
- 1976 Scot Breithaupt**
- 1977 Stu Thomsen***
- 1978 Stu Thomsen***
- 1979 Greg Hill****
- 1980 Donny Atherton
- 1981 Keith Gaynor

Amat. Nat.#1 Powder Puff

- 1974
- 1975
- 1976
- 1977
- 1978
- 1979 Debbie Shobert
- 1980
- 1981

*The NBA did not have a true National no.1 until 1975 when the first true national was held. Until then No.1s were strictly district. However, since the NBA Southern California District was the largest by far in the country during those years (indeed, only in Arizona did the NBA have any districts outside of California) and John George in 1975 and before him David Clinton in 1974 where the district champions at the end of those seasons that made them National No.1s by default. In the case of David Clinton in 1974 almost no tracks existed outside of California and none of those were NBA sanctioned.
**The NBA did have a separate professional division beginning in 1976, but until 1979 the National No.1 plate was all around for every class pro or amateur.

***The Number One pro title did not exist until 1979.

****NBA Pros were allowed to race in the Amateur class and hold the amateur title at the time, so Greg Hill, while a professional was eligible for and won the no. 1 Amateur title.

=== National Bicycle League (NBL) ===
Note: Dates reflect the year the racers *won* their plates, not the year they actually *raced* their No.1 plates. In other words, Antony Sewell won his No.1 plate in 1980 entitling him to race with #1 on his plate for the 1981 season. Stu Thomsen then won the No.1 plate in 1981 and raced with #1 on his plate during the 1982 racing season.

Elite ("AA") Pro Nat.#1

- 1978 Sal Zeuner**
- 1979 Greg Esser**
- 1980 Anthony Sewell
- 1981 Stu Thomsen
- 1982 Stu Thomsen
- 1983 Eric Rupe
- 1984 Eric Rupe
- 1985 Greg Hill
- 1986 Pete Loncarevich
- 1987 Pete Loncarevich
- 1988 Greg Hill
- 1989 Gary Ellis
- 1990 Terry Tenette
- 1991 Terry Tenette
- 1992 Terry Tenette
- 1993 Eric Carter
- 1994 Gary Ellis
- 1995 John Purse
- 1996 John Purse
- 1997 Christophe Lévêque
- 1998 Christophe Lévêque
- 1999 Danny Nelson
- 2000 Thomas Allier
- 2001 Jamie Staff
- 2002 Kyle Bennett
- 2003 Randy Stumpfhauser
- 2004 Kyle Bennett
- 2005 Mike Day
- 2006 Donny Robinson
- 2007 Kyle Bennett
- 2008 Randy Stumpfhauser
- 2009 Maris Strombergs
- 2010 Maris Strombergs
- 2011 ----

Pro Nat.#1 (Elite) Cruiser

- 1981 Brent Patterson
- 1982 Brent Patterson
- 1983 Brent Patterson
- 1984 Toby Henderson
- 1985 Greg Hill
- 1986 Greg Hill
- 1987 Eric Rupe
- 1988 Eric Rupe
- 1989 Ron Walker
- 1990 Kenny May
- 1991 Barry McManus
- 1992 Barry McManus
- 1993
- 1994 Justin Green
- 1995
- 1996 Billy Au
- 1997 Kiyomi Waller
- 1998 Randy Stumpfhauser
- 1999 Dale Holmes
- 2000 Kevin Tomko
- 2001 Randy Stumpfhauser
- 2002 Randy Stumpfhauser
- 2003 Randy Stumpfhauser
- 2004 Randy Stumpfhauser
- 2005 Donny Robinson
- 2006 TD****
- 2007 TD
- 2008 TD
- 2009 TD
- 2010 TD
- 2011 ----

"A" Pro/Super-EX Nat.#1

- 1981 TDNE***
- 1982 TDNE
- 1983 TDNE
- 1984 TDNE
- 1985 TDNE
- 1986 TDNE
- 1987 TDNE
- 1988 TDNE
- 1989 TDNE
- 1990 Darrin Waterbury
- 1991 Barry McManus
- 1992 Brian Foster
- 1993
- 1994
- 1995
- 1996
- 1997 Jeff Dein
- 1998 Steven Spahr
- 1999 Todd Lyons
- 2000 Eric Rupe
- 2001
- 2002 Jonathan Suarez
- 2003 Derek Betcher
- 2004 Augusto Castro
- 2005 Derek Betcher
- 2006 TD****
- 2007 TD
- 2008 Carlos Oquendo
- 2009 Josh Meyers
- 2010 Josh Meyers
- 2011 ----

"A" Pro Cruiser Nat.#1

- 1998
- 1999
- 2000
- 2001
- 2002 Eric Rupe
- 2003 Jason Carnes
- 2004
- 2005
- 2006
- 2007 TD****
- 2008 TD
- 2009 TD
- 2010 TD
- 2011 ----

Pro Nat. #1 Masters

- 1997
- 1998
- 1999
- 2000 Eric Rupe
- 2001
- 2002 Derek Betcher
- 2003
- 2004 Eric Rupe
- 2005 Dave Bittner
- 2006 Kiyomi Waller
- 2007
- 2008 Dale Holmes
- 2009 Dale Holmes
- 2010 Dale Holmes
- 2011 ----

Amateur & Elite Pro Nat.#1 Women

- 1980 Heidi Mirisola(Am)†
- 1981 Kathy Schachel(Am)
- 1982 Kathy Schachel(Am)
- 1983 Kathy Schachel(Am)
- 1984 Debbie Kalsow(Am)
- 1985 Kathy Schachel(Pro)
- 1986 Kathy Schachel(Pro)
- 1987 Gaby Bayhi(Pro)
- 1988 Stacey Lupfer(Am)
- 1989 Jennifer Wardle(Am)
- 1990 Christy Homa(Am)
- 1991 Melanie Cline(Am)
- 1992 Marie McGilvary(Am)
- 1993 Michelle Cairns(Am)
- 1994 Marie McGilvary(Am)
- 1995 Marie McGilvary(Am)
- 1996 Marie McGilvary(Sup)‡
- 1997 Michelle Cairns
- 1998 Michelle Cairns
- 1999 Marie McGilvar
- 2000 Natarsha Williams
- 2001 Natarsha Williams
- 2002 Jill Kintner
- 2003 Kim Hayashi
- 2004 Kim Hayashi
- 2005 Kim Hayashi
- 2006 Kim Hayashi
- 2007 Kim Hayashi
- 2008 Stephanie Barragan
- 2009 Dominique Daniels
- 2010 Dominique Daniels
- 2011 ----

Am Nat.#1 Girls Cruiser

- 1991 Michelle Cairns
- 1992
- 1993
- 1994
- 1995
- 1996
- 1997
- 1998
- 1999
- 2000
- 2001
- 2002
- 2003
- 2004
- 2005
- 2006
- 2007
- 2008 TD****
- 2009 TD
- 2010 TD
- 2011 ----

*Class Did Not Exist

**Until the 1980 season the #1 plate holder was considered #1 overall amateur or professional. The NBL did have a pro class in 1977, 1978 & 1979 but the title of National Number One Professional was not created until the 1980 season when the pros and the 16 Experts were separated and the pros earning separate points (in the form of purse money won) from the amateurs. Prior to 1980 the pros, due to the comparatively small number of them, competed with the 16 Experts and were able to earn amateur titles.

***Title Did Not Exist The title plate for this class did exist under the title of "B" pro (which was created for the 1981 season), but it was not until 1990 when the name was changed to "Superclass" and it became a pro/am class were the racers of that class given an opportunity to win a separate year end overall National #1 plate title separate from the pure Pro and the pure amateur classes. Amateurs competed for prizes and Pros could compete for a limited amount purses. Also beginning in the 1990 season "Pro Cruiser" was renamed "Super Cruiser" and "A" Pro "All Pro". In 1996 Super Cruiser was renamed "Pro Cruiser" once again and "All" Pro reverted to "Pro Class" This was to harmonize NBL nomenclature with UCI/IBMXF labels. Because of this the NBL would change the name of its pro Classes many times during the 1990s, They even began calling there senior pro class "AA" and the junior pros "A" just like the ABA beginning in the year 2000. Continuing the name shuffle the senior male pro class was officially known as Elite Men and the junior men "A" pro until the end of the 2006 season. Beginning with the 2007 season the junior "A" pro class was called "Super X" (SX). The single level pro females are called Elite Women. Beginning with the 2006 season the NBL ceased offering an independent year end title for both the "A" pro class and the Pro Cruisers. In the case of Pro Cruiser it was an end of a long era with the Pro Cruiser No.1 title going back to 1981 when Brent Patterson first won the class. In 2007 the junior pro class was rechristened "Super X" and an independent year end number one plate was reestablished.

****Title Discontinued

†(AM)=Amateur. From 1981 to 1984 the girl's National No.1 title was amateur. Between 1985 and 1987 a girl's pro class was established but that division was discontinued between 1988 and 1996 due to lack of participants and those National No.1 women titles were again amateurs. From 1997 to the present the title is a professional one once again.
‡(Sup)=Superclass. Superclass was a Pro/Am class.

=== American Bicycle Association (ABA) ===
Note: Dates reflect the year the racers *won* their plates, not the year they actually *raced* their No.1 plates. In other words, Stu Thomsen won his No.1 title in 1979 entitling him to race with #1 on his plate for the 1980 season. Brent Patterson then won the No.1 plate in 1980 and raced with #1 on his plate during the 1981 racing season.

Pro Nat.#1 Men (AA)

- 1977 Title did not exist*
- 1978 Title did not exist*
- 1979 Stu Thomsen
- 1980 Brent Patterson
- 1981 Kevin McNeal
- 1982 Brian Patterson
- 1983 Brian Patterson
- 1984 Pete Loncarevich
- 1985 Ronnie Anderson
- 1986 Pete Loncarevich
- 1987 Charles Townsend
- 1988 Mike King
- 1989 Gary Ellis
- 1990 Gary Ellis
- 1991 Pete Loncarevich
- 1992 Pete Loncarevich
- 1993 Steve Veltman
- 1994 Gary Ellis
- 1995 Gary Ellis
- 1996 Robert MacPherson
- 1997 John Purse
- 1998 Christophe Lévêque
- 1999 Christophe Lévêque
- 2000 Wade Bootes
- 2001 Warwick Stevenson
- 2002 Danny Nelson
- 2003 Warwick Stevenson
- 2004 Bubba Harris
- 2005 Bubba Harris
- 2006 Bubba Harris
- 2007 Danny Caluag
- 2008 Khalen Young
- 2009 Randy Stumpfhauser
- 2010 Sam Willoughby
- 2011 ----

Pro Nat.#1 Cruiser Men

- Title did not exist**
- TDNE
- TDNE
- TDNE
- TDNE
- TDNE
- Eric Rupe
- Eric Rupe
- Hans Nissen
- Kenny May
- Kenny May
- Darrell Young
- Terry Tenette
- Justin Green
- Kiyomi Waller
- Wade Bootes
- Kiyomi Waller
- Kiyomi Waller
- Dale Holmes
- Andy Contes
- Randy Stumpfhauser
- Randy Stumpfhauser
- Randy Stumpfhauser
- Randy Stumpfhauser
- Randy Stumpfhauser
- Donny Robinson
- Danny Caluag
- Danny Caluag
- Danny Caluag
- Barry Nobles
- ----

Veteran Pro Nat.#1 Men

- 1993 Harry Leary
- 1994 Harry Leary
- 1995 Eric Rupe
- 1996 Eric Rupe
- 1997 Eric Rupe
- 1998 Eric Rupe
- 1999 Eric Rupe
- 2000 Eric Rupe
- 2001 Eric Rupe
- 2002 Jason Carnes
- 2003 Jason Carnes
- 2004 Jason Carnes
- 2005 Jason Carnes
- 2006 Jason Carnes
- 2007 Jason Carnes
- 2008 Kenth Fallen
- 2009 Kenth Fallen
- 2010 Kenth Fallen
- 2011 ----

Pro Nat.#1 Women

- CDNE
- CDNE
- CDNE
- CDNE
- CDNE
- CDNE
- CDNE
- CDNE
- CDNE
- CDNE
- CDNE
- CDNE
- CDNE
- CDNE
- CDNE
- CDNE
- CDNE
- CDNE
- CDNE
- CDNE
- CDNE
- Heather Bruns
- Michelle Cairns
- Jamie Lilly
- Alice Jung
- Alice Jung
- Jamie Lilly
- Samantha Cools
- Samantha Cools
- Alise Post
- Alise Post
- Dominique Daniels
- Dominique Daniels
- Dominique Daniels
- ----

Am. Nat.#1 Men

- 1977 Title did not exist
- 1978 Kyle Fleming
- 1979 Richie Anderson
- 1980 Richie Anderson
- 1981 Jason Wharton
- 1982 Steve Veltman
- 1983 Doug Davis
- 1984 Mike King
- 1985 Brent Romero
- 1986 Eric Carter
- 1987 Mike King
- 1988 Kenny May
- 1989 Marty Christman
- 1990 David Milham
- 1991 Zack Roebuck
- 1992 Alexis Vergara
- 1993 Adam McGuire
- 1994 Kevin Royal
- 1995 Robert MacPherson
- 1996 Matt Ortwein
- 1997 Brandon Meadows
- 1998 Andy Contes
- 1999 Brandon Nicholls
- 2000 Ian Stoffel
- 2001 Wes Jones
- 2002 Sean Lechner
- 2003 Josh Oie
- 2004 Josh Oie
- 2005 David Herman
- 2006 David Herman
- 2007 Nic Long
- 2008 Nic Long
- 2009 Corben Sharrah
- 2010 Joshua Klatman
- 2011 Joshua Klatman

Am. Nat.#1 Cruiser Men

- CDNE
- CDNE
- CDNE
- Jeff Kosmala
- Joe Claveau
- Steve Veltman
- Brett Allen
- Jason Johnson
- Shawn Callihan
- Matt Hadan
- Darwin Griffin
- Kenny May
- Shelby James
- Justin Green
- In Hee Lee
- In Hee Lee
- Anthony Freeman
- Larry Miersch
- Randy Stumpfhauser
- Barry Nilson
- Barry Nilson
- Barry Nilson
- Barry Nilson
- Wes Jones
- Jarret Kolich
- Mike Ellis
- Kirk Chrisco
- Terrel Proctor
- Robert O'Gorman
- Chris Verhagen
- Anthony Russell
- Corey Cook
- George Goodall
- Brodie Spott
- ----

Am. Nat.#1 Women

- 1982 Debbie Kalsow
- 1983 Cheri Elliott
- 1984 Cheri Elliott
- 1985 Cheri Elliott
- 1986 Dianna Bowling
- 1987 Nikki Murray
- 1988 Cindy Davis
- 1989 Mapuana Naki
- 1990 Tammy Daugherty
- 1991 Marla Brady
- 1992 Betsy Edmunson
- 1993 Shara Wilson
- 1994 Ashley Recklau
- 1995 Cindy Davis
- 1996 Ashley Recklau
- 1997 Ashley Recklau
- 1998 Jessica Cisar
- 1999 Brooke Elder
- 2000 Brooke Elder
- 2001 Alise Post
- 2002 Terra Nichols
- 2003 Terra Nichols
- 2004 Alise Post
- 2005 Tyler Schaefer
- 2006 Shelby Long
- 2007 Dominique Daniels
- 2008 Jordan Nopens
- 2009 Jordan Nopens
- 2010 Tyler Schaeffer
- 2011 ----

Am. Nat.#1 Cruiser Women

- CDNE
- CDNE
- CDNE
- CDNE
- CDNE
- CDNE
- CDNE
- CDNE
- CDNE
- CDNE
- Leigh Donovan
- Leigh Donovan
- Dianna Bowling
- Stephanie Anderson
- Cindy Davis
- Sheila Songcuan
- Cindy Davis
- Cindy Davis
- Darcey Cobb
- Ashley Recklau
- Anna Appleby
- Ashley Recklau
- Ashley Recklau
- Kim Hayashi
- Kim Hayashi
- Mailani Mcnabb
- Alise Post
- Alise Post
- Samantha Bretheim
- Tyler Schaefer
- Dominique Daniels
- Felicia Stancil
- Carly Dyar
- Kelsey Van Ogle
- ----

*Until the 1979 season the #1 plate holder was considered #1 overall amateur or professional. The ABA did have a pro class in 1977 & 1978 but the title of National Number One Professional was not created until the 1979 season when the pros and the 16 Experts were separated and the pros earning separate points (in the form of purse money won) from the amateurs. Prior to 1979 the pros, due to the comparatively small number of them, competed with the 16 Experts and were able to earn amateur titles.

**Title Did Not Exist. While the ABA did start its pro cruiser class in 1981 the title pro cruiser National Number One did not exist until 1987.

== See also ==
- Keirin
