= Jamie Lilly =

American bicycle motocross rider (born 1983)

Personal information
- Full name: Jamie Nicole Lilly
- Nickname: "Kiddo #1"
- Born: February 9, 1983 (age 43) San Diego, California, United States

Cycling career
- Sport: Cycling
- Discipline: Bicycle Motocross (BMX)
- Role: Racer
- Rider type: Off Road

Amateur teams
- 1989-1991: Kastans Engineering
- 1991: D&M
- 1991-1992: Racing Powerlite
- 1992-1993: U.S. Boss Racing Products
- 1994-1995: Auburn
- 1996-1998: GT Racing

Professional teams
- 1998-2000: GT Racing/Panasonic Shockwave
- 2000-2001: System's West/Profile Racing
- 2001-2002: System's West/Redline Bicycles
- 2002-2004: Free Agent/System's West
- 2004: Fox/Supercross
- 2006: Hyper Bicycles

Jamie Nicole Lilly (born February 9, 1983) is an American former professional "Mid School" Bicycle Motocross (BMX) racer whose prime competitive years were from 1987 to 2004. Nicknamed "Kiddo #1" at the age of 8 years, she became one of the first female professionals of the American Bicycle Association (ABA) when they for the first time created a female professional division in the sanctioning body's history in 1998 (the NBL had restarted their pro girls class in 1997 after their first attempt between 1985 and 1987) and became one the ABA's first number one Girl Pros.

== BMX racing career milestones ==
Note: Professional first are on the national level unless otherwise indicated.

Milestone	Event details
Started racing:	May 1988 at the age of five years. Records show that her name first appeared in the California District 2 (CA-02) district points listing for May 1988 in the July 1988 issue of American BMXer, the American Bicycle Association's (ABA) in-house newspaper. She was five years old at the time having turned five the previous February 9, 1988.
Sanctioning body:	American Bicycle Association (ABA)
Sanctioning body district(s):	ABA: California District 2 (CA-2) 1988–1992; CA-3, 1994
First sponsor:	Kastan Engineering 1989
First national win:	Possibly at the American Bicycle Association (ABA) Fall Nationals in Yorba Linda, California on October 28, 1989 (Day 1) in 7 and Under Girls. The next day she won 6 & Under Girls, indicating that the previous day was a combined class due to lack of meeting the minimal number of participants required to have a class. Her first national appearance was at the ABA Supernationals in Yorba Linda, California on August 6, 1988 (Day 1) in 8 & Under girls. She was five years old at the time. She came in sixth.
Turned Professional:	1998 at the age of 15 years
Retired:	Originally in late 2004 Due to a knee injury. She would attempt a comeback in early 2006, going so far as signing with Hyper Bicycles, but nothing came of it. However, she would race again. On June 27, 2009, she competed in her first race in five years when she took part in the South Park NBL National in South Park, Pennsylvania. She came in fourth place in Pro Girls.

*In the NBL Junior Women; No comparable level exists in the ABA.
**In the NBL it was/is Supergirls/Elite Women; in the ABA it is Pro Girls.

=== Career factory and major bike shop sponsors ===
Note: This listing only denotes the racer's primary sponsors. At any given time a racer could have numerous ever changing co-sponsors. Primary sponsorships can be verified by BMX press coverage and sponsor's advertisements at the time in question. When possible exact dates are used.

==== Amateur–Junior Women ====
- Kastan Engineering: October 1989-January 1991. The ABA Fallnationals in Yorba Linda, California on October 28, 1989 (Day 1) was the first national she that raced with this sponsor. The ABA Silver Dollar National in Reno, Nevada on January 13, 1991, was the last race on Kastan.
- D&M Racing: February 1991-thru mid-1991. Lilly's first race for D&M was the ABA Winternationals in Phoenix, Arizona on February 16, 1991.
- Powerlite: 1991-September 1992
- U.S. Boss Racing Products: September 1992 – 1993
- Auburn: January 1994-December 1995
- GT (Gary Turner) Bicycles: January 1996-December 1997

==== Professional–Elite Women ====
- GT Racing/Panasonic Shockwave:January 1998-Mid October 2000
- System's West/Profile Racing: October 23, 2000-July 2001
- System's West/Redline Bicycles: July 2001-November 2002
- Free Agent/System's West: November 2002-January 2004. The 2002 ABA Grandnational was her first race with Free Agent.
- Fox/Supercross: February 2004-Late 2004
- Hiatus due to knee injury
- Hyper Bicycles: January 2006-She attempted a comeback after suffering a knee injury and surgercal repair a year prior (see "Significant Injuries" section) -?

Three year hiatus (2006-2009): After another hiatus Her first race back was supposed to be the NBL Boulder Dam National in Boulder City, Nevada on February 25, 2009. She was unsponsored

=== Career bicycle motocross titles ===
Note: Listed are District, State/Provincial/Department, Regional, National, and International titles in italics. Only sanctioning bodies that existed during the racer's career(s) are listed. Depending on point totals of individual racers, winners of Grand Nationals do not necessarily win National titles. Series and one off Championships are also listed in block.

==== Amateur/Junior Women ====
National Bicycle League (NBL)

- 1996 13 Girls Grandnational Champion
- 1996 13 Girls National No.1

American Bicycle Association (ABA)

- 1989 6 & Under Girls National No.2
- 1990 7 Girls US Open West Champion
- 1990 California District 2 (CA-02) Girls No.1
- 1990 7 Girls Race of Champions (ROC) Champion
- 1990 7 Girls NAG No.1
- 1990 7 Girls Grandnational Champion.
- 1991 8 Girls NAG No.1
- 1991 8 Girls Grandnational Champion
- 1992 California District 2 (CA-02) Girls No.1
- 1992 California District 2 (CA-02) Girls Cruiser No.1 Only girl in that district in that division.
- 1992 9 Girls Grandnational Champion
- 1995 12 Girls Grandnational Champion
- 1996 13 Girls World Cup Champion
- 1996 13 Girls Grandnational Champion

Fédération Internationale Amateur de Cyclisme (FIAC)*

- None

International Bicycle Motocross Federation (IBMXF)*

- None (defunct)

Union Cycliste Internationale (UCI)*

- 2000 Junior Woman World Champion
- 2001 Junior Women Bronze Medal World Champion

*See note in professional section

==== Professional/Elite Women ====
National Bicycle League (NBL)

- 2000 North American International Pro Girl Champion.
- 2001 Super Girls Grandnational Champion

American Bicycle Association (ABA)

- 1998 ABA Race of Champions Pro Girl Champion.
- 2000 Pro Girls World Champion
- 2000 Pro Girls Grandnational Champion
- 2000 Pro Girls National No.1
- 2001 Pro Girls World Champion
- 2002 Pro Girls National No.2
- 2003 Pro Girls World Champion
- 2003 Pro Girls Grandnational Champion
- 2003 Pro Girls National No.1

International Bicycle Motocross Federation (IBMXF)*

- None (defunct)

Fédération Internationale Amateur de Cyclisme (FIAC)*

- None (FIAC did not have a strictly professional division during its existence) (defunct).

Union Cycliste Internationale (UCI)*

*Note: Beginning in 1991 the IBMXF and FIAC had been holding joint World Championship events as a transitional phase in merging which began in earnest in 1993. Beginning with the 1996 season the IBMXF and FIAC completed the merger and both ceased to exist as independent entities being integrated into the UCI. Beginning with the 1997 World Championships held in Brighton, England the UCI would officially hold and sanction BMX World Championships and with it inherited all precedents, records, streaks, etc. from both the IBMXF and FIAC.

Pro Series Championships

=== Notable accolades ===
- Named no. 22 of Crig Bertlett's "gOrk's Top 90 BMXers of the 90s!!" 1999 list
- She was the highest money-making girl in the sport in 1999 according to gOrk in his top 90 list.

=== Significant injuries ===
- Lilly had ACL replacement surgery on her knee on January 1, 2005.

=== Miscellaneous and trivia ===
- Lilly appeared in the last episode of the fourth season (1989–1990) of the television program L.A. Law when she was seven years old. That episode, "The Last Gasp", originally aired May 17, 1990.
- Lilly won more pro women's races than anyone in 1999.

== BMX press magazine interviews and articles ==
- "Q&A: If you could race one race over again, which would it be?" Snap BMX Magazine December 1999 Vol.6 Iss.10 No. 38 pg. 42 Single-question interview asked of Lilly and four other professional racers including Randy Stumpfhauser, Christophe Lévêque, Neal Wood, and Michelle Cairns.

== BMX magazine covers ==
Note: Only magazines that were in publication at the time of the racer's career(s) are listed unless specifically noted.

Minicycle/BMX Action & Super BMX:

- None

Bicycle Motocross Action & Go:

- None

BMX Plus!:

Ride BMX Magazine:

Snap BMX Magazine and Transworld BMX:

- None

BMX World

Bicycles Today and BMX Today (the official BMX publication of the NBL under two different names):

ABA Action, American BMXer, BMXer (the official BMX publication of the ABA under three different names):
