= Joey Bradford =

American BMX (bicycle motocross) rider

Personal information
- Full name: Joseph Bradford
- Born: October 10, 1989 (age 37) Monterey, California, U.S.
- Height: 5 ft 8 in (1.73 m)
- Weight: 175 lb (79 kg)

Cycling career
- Sport: Cycling
- Current team: Prophecy Bmx
- Disciplines: Bicycle Motocross (BMX); Mountain bike racing (MTB)
- Role: Racer
- Rider type: Off Road; MTB: Downhill, four-cross

Amateur teams
- 1999: Haynes BMX
- 1999: No Fear Racing
- 1999-2000: Kovachi Wheels
- 2000-2001: Fox/Specialized/Mt. Dew
- 2002-2003: Staats Bicycles
- 2003-2004: Avent/Bomshell
- 2005: Hyundai/Mongoose
- 2005: GT Bicycles

Professional team
- 2006-Present: GT Bicycles

Joseph Bradford (born October 10, 1989) is an American professional "New/Current School" Bicycle Motocross (BMX) racer whose prime competitive years are from 1999 to the present. His nickname is simply "Joey".

== BMX racing career milestones ==
Note: Professional first are on the national level unless otherwise indicated.

Milestone	Event Details
Started racing:	July 13, 1997 at the age of seven.
Sanctioning body:	
Home sanctioning body district:	
First race bike:	GT Mach One.
First race result:	Third Place in seven novice
First win (local):	Early August 1997 in his third time racing in seven novice.
First sponsor:	
First national win:	
Turned Professional:	December 2006 at age 17.
First Professional race result:	Came in 5th in the semis and did not make "A" pro main of the American Bicycle Association (ABA) Silver Dollar Nationals in Reno, Nevada on January 6, 2007. He came in second place the next day.
First Professional win:	In Junior Men at the National Bicycle League (NBL) Lake Meed Nationals in Boulder City, Nevada on February 24, 2007 (Day1).
First Junior Men/Pro* race result:	See "First Professional race result".
First Junior Men/Pro win:	See "First Professional win".
First Senior Pro** race result:	
First Senior Pro win:	
Retired:	Still active.
Height & weight at height of his career (2006):	Ht:5'8" Wt:175 lbs. (1.75m 75 kg).

*In the NBL "B" Pro/Super Class/"A" Pro/Junior Elite Men depending on the era; in the ABA it is "A" Pro.
**In the NBL it is "AA" Pro/Elite Men; in the ABA it is "AA" Pro.

=== Career factory and major bike shop sponsors ===
Note: This listing only denotes the racer's primary sponsors. At any given time a racer could have numerous ever changing co-sponsors. Primary sponsorships can be verified by BMX press coverage and sponsor's advertisements at the time in question. When possible exact dates are given.

==== Amateur/Junior Men ====
- Haynes BMX: 1999
- No Fear Racing: -April 1999
- Kovachi Wheels:April 1999 – 2000
- Fox/Specialized/Mountain Dew: 2000-2001
- Staats Bicycles: 2002-December 2003
- Avent/Bomshell: December 2003-December 2004
- Hyundai/Mongoose: January 2005-Mid December 2005
- GT (Gary Turner) Bicycles: December 20, 2005–Present. Joey would turn pro with this sponsor.

==== Professional/Elite Men ====
- GT (Gary Turner) Bicycles: December 20, 2005–Present.

=== Career bicycle motocross titles ===
Note: Listed are District, State/Provincial/Department, Regional, National, and International titles in italics. Depending on point totals of individual racers, winners of Grand Nationals do not necessarily win National titles. Only sanctioning bodies active during the racer's career are listed. Series and one off Championships are also listed in block.

==== Amateur/Junior Men ====
National Bicycle League (NBL)

- 1998 8 Expert National No.1
- 1999 9 Expert & 9-10 Cruiser National No.1
- 1998,'99,'00 California State Champion
- 1998,'99,'00 Western-Regional Champion
- 1998 8 Expert President's Cup Champion
- 2002 12 Expert and 12 Cruiser Grandnational Champion
- 2002 12 Expert and 12 Cruiser National No.1
- 2003 13 Expert and 13 Cruiser Grandnational Champion
- 2003 13 Expert & 13-14 Cruiser National No.1
- 2004 14 Expert Grandnational Champion.
- 2004 14 Expert National No.1
- 2005 15 Expert National No.1
- 2006 16 Expert National No.1

American Bicycle Association (ABA)

- 1998 8 Expert Gold Cup West Champion
- 1998,'99,'00,'01,'02,'03 California State Champion
- 1998 10 Expert Redline Gold Cup Champion
- 1999 10 Expert & 10 Cruiser Race of Champions Champion
- 2000 12 Expert & 12 Cruiser Redline Gold Cup Champion
- 2001 11 Expert World Champion
- 2001 12 Expert & 12 Cruiser Race of Champions champion
- 2002 12 Expert & 12 Cruiser World Champion
- 2002 13 Expert & 13 Cruiser Race of Champions champion
- 2003 14 Expert & 14 Cruiser Race of Champions (ROC) champion
- 2004 14 Expert & 14 Cruiser World Champion
- 2004 15 Expert & 15 Cruiser Redline Gold Cup Champion
- 2005 15 Expert & 15 Cruiser World Champion
- 2005 16 Expert & 16 Cruiser Redline Gold Cup Champion
- 2005 16 Expert National Age Group (NAG) No.1
- 2006 17 Expert Redline Gold Cup Cruiser Champion

Union Cycliste Internationale (UCI)

- 2000 11 Boys World Champion
- 2002 12 Boys World Champion
- 2003 13 Boys & 13-14 Cruiser World Champion
- 2005 15 Boys & 15-16 Cruiser World Champion
- 2003 14-16 Pacific Oceanic Champion
- 2005 14–16 Boys Pan Pacific Champion
- 2006 14–16 boys Pan Pacific Champion
- 2006 North American Junior Men Champion
- 2007 Junior Men's Silver Medal World Champion

USA Cycling BMX

- 2007 Junior Cruiser National Champion

==== Professional/Elite Men ====
National Bicycle League (NBL)

American Bicycle Association (ABA)

Union Cycliste Internationale (UCI)*

USA Cycling

BMX South Africa (BMXSA)

- 2007 Elite Men South African National Champion

Pro Series Championships

=== BMX product lines ===
- 2006 Fly Joey Bradford Signature Series Bars.

Product evaluation:

=== Significant injuries ===
- Dislocated shoulder in a crash during the main at the 2006 UCI World Championships in the Netherlands.
- Suffered a bad muscle bruise injury in his left lower back falling coming out of the first turn in the first moto at the ABA Winternationals in Phoenix, Arizona on March 25, 2007.

=== Miscellaneous ===
- In early 2007 when Bradford was still just 17 years old he started the "Joey Bradford Disability Fund" to aid financially seriously injured and/or financially troubled BMX racers. BMX despite being an Olympic sport and gaining world respect, is still not truly a professional sport in which a racer could become financially independent. Sponsors provide professional racers their salaries as well as providing them with free travel, expenses, entrance fees for racers, and free bicycle parts as well as payment for appearing in advertisements. If he or she is let go by a sponsor, that racer would often be in financial straits. With no salary, free travel or other expenses paid. He would solely rely on race winnings to support his racing, which would be of course, partly offset by the entrance fees he would have to pay for out of pocket including travel cost. The financial pressures are even greater if the racer is married with children with a mortgage and car payments. As a result, a racer could find him/herself in dire straits if he is injured, particularly if it is a career ending one. There is no pensions for BMXers as there are in major long established sports like baseball football basketball etc.

To aid racers who have fallen on financially hard times Bradford along with veterans of the sport founded the fund. As described at the fatbmx.com website:

:"The Foundation, a federally recognized and regulated non-profit organization, aims to ease the burden of medical bills, either by injury or illness, for BMX professionals as well as BMX industry professionals, those whose primary income comes from the BMX industry itself. “Getting injured is the worst thing that can happen to a professional athlete,” states Professional BMX racer Brandon Meadows. “When I broke my femur for the second time, things seem to go downhill real fast. I just started a family, lost my sponsor, broke my leg, no way to make any money, and it soon came to a realization that it was going to be hard to make ends meet.”

Applicants must apply themselves or via a family member and their case will be reviewed by the five person Fund Committee. If the application is approved, up to 50% of the fund can be released to help with monetary medical obligations."

== BMX and general press magazine interviews and articles ==
- "Background Check: Joey Bradford" Transworld BMX July 2004 Vol.11 Iss.7 No.93 pg.86

== BMX magazine covers ==
Note: Only magazines that were in publication at the time of the racer's career(s) are listed unless specifically noted.

BMX Plus!:

Snap BMX Magazine & Transworld BMX:

- None

Twenty BMX:

Moto Mag:

- None

BMX World (2005–Present):

Bicycles Today & BMX Today (The official NBL publication under two names):

ABA Action, American BMXer, BMXer (The official ABA publication under three names):

== Post BMX Career ==
- Still active. However, in 2003 he started a simultaneous Mountain Bike Racing career, one of the few BMXers to do so at his stage in his career which was only six years into his BMX amateur career. Most BMXers who cross over to MTB racing do so after his BMX career or in its last few years. John Tomac, Tinker Juarez started MTB racing after their BMX careers. Pete Loncarevich, Eric Carter, Bas de Bever, Corine Dorland and Dale Holmes started their MTB careers during the one or two twilight years of BMX racing. Among the exceptions is Wade Bootes that started MTB racing essentially during the middle of his BMX career. It is difficult for a racer to train effectively at the championship level for either of the two disciplines although skills for one easily translate to the other, still the training regimen for one is different enough to adversely affect the other. As a result, most start the crossover just about at the end of their usually long BMX racing careers.

== Mountain Bike career ==
Started racing: 2003

Sub Discipline: 4 Cross Downhil

=== Career MTB factory and major Non-factory sponsors ===
Note: This listing only denotes the racer's primary sponsors. At any given time a racer could have numerous co-sponsors. Primary sponsorships can be verified by MTB press coverage and sponsor's advertisements at the time in question. When possible exact dates are given.

==== Amateur ====
- Staats Bicycles: 2002-2003
- Avent/Bomshell: 2003-2004
- Hyundai/Mongoose: January 2005-Mid December 2005
- GT (Gary Turner) Bicycles: December 20, 2005–Present. Joey would turn pro with this sponsor.

=== Career Mountain Bike Racing (MTB) titles ===
Note: Listed are Regional, National and International titles.

==== Amateur ====
- 2003,'04,'05,'06 Sea Otter Classic 4cross Champion

==== Professional ====
- Union Cycliste Internationale (UCI)
- National Off Road Bicycle Association (NORBA)
- USA Cycling
