= Deanna Edwards =

American BMX racer

Personal information
- Full name: Deanna J. Jamieson née Edwards
- Born: June 13, 1970 Walled Lake, Michigan, U.S.
- Died: June 22, 2015

Cycling career
- Sport: Cycling
- Current team: Supercross
- Discipline: Bicycle Motocross (BMX)
- Role: Racer
- Rider type: Off Road

Amateur teams
- 1982-1983: Davis Racing
- 1984: Columbus Schwinn
- 1984-1986: GT Racing
- 1986-1987: World Class
- (1988-2004): Retired for 16 years
- 2004-: Supercross

Deanna J. Jamieson (née Edwards) (June 13, 1970 - June 22, 2015 from Walled Lake, Michigan United States) was an amateur "Old School" Bicycle Motocross (BMX) racer whose prime competitive years were from 1981-1987. She retired in 1987 but resumed racing in 2004.

== Racing career milestones ==
Note: Professional firsts are on the national level unless otherwise indicated.

Milestone	Event Details
Started racing:	February 15, 1980 at nine years old at the Bogie Downs race track. She got into racing because Raleigh, a bicycle company, did not name girls in one of their advertisements.
Sanctioning body:	
Sanctioning body district(s):	American Bicycle Association (ABA): Michigan District 5 (MI-5) 1981-1987
First race bike:	
First race result:	2nd place.
First win (local):	
First sponsor:	
First national win:	
Turned Professional:	No professional career.
Height and weight at height of her career (1987):	Ht:5'10 (2005)
Retired:	Originally 1987 at age 17. Her last race was the 1987 NBL Grandnational in which she won her 16 & Over girls' class and took National No.1 for that division. She retired because she was burned out with the traveling taking its toll and she wanted to be a "normal kid." She resumed racing in 2004 at age 34. Still active.

=== Career factory and major bike shop sponsors ===
Note: This listing only denotes the racer's primary sponsors. At any given time a racer could have numerous ever-changing co-sponsors. Primary sponsorships can be verified by BMX press coverage and sponsor's advertisements at the time in question. When possible exact dates are used.

==== Amateur ====
- Davis Racing: Early 1982-1983
- Columbus Schwinn: Early 1984-December 1984
- GT (Gary Turner) Racing: December 1984-Mid December 1986 Left because the ABA and NBL dropped its requirement that team must have at least one girl on it and the new team manager wanted to take the team "..in a different direction.".
- World Class: Mid December 1986-September 1987 Edward's last race was the 1987 NBL Grand Nationals.
- Retired for 16 years (1988–2004) Restarted racing 2004
- Supercross: 2004–Present

==== Professional ====
- No professional career.

=== Career bicycle motocross titles ===
Note: Listed are District, State/Provincial/Department, Regional, National, and International titles in italics. "Defunct" refers to the fact of that sanctioning body in question no longer existing at the start of the racer's career or at that stage of his/her career. Depending on point totals of individual racers, winners of Grand Nationals do not necessarily win National titles. Series and one off Championships are also listed in block.

==== Amateur ====
National Bicycle Association (NBA)

- None

National Bicycle League (NBL)

- 1982 10-11 Girls Grandnational Champion
- 1982 10-11 Girls National No.1
- 1983 12-13 Girls National No.1
- 1984 14 Girls National No.1
- 1985 15 Girls Grandnational Champion
- 1985 15 Girls National No.1
- 1986 16 & Over Girls Murray World Cup V Champion
- 1986, 1987 16 & Over Girls Grandnational Champion.
- 1986 & 1987 16 & Over Girls National No.1
- 2007 36-40 Women Cruiser Grand National Champion

American Bicycle Association (ABA)

- 1982, 1985, 1986 Michigan District #5 (Mich-5) No.1 Girl
- 1983 13-14 Girls International Super Bowl of BMX Champion*
- 1985 15 & Over Girls National No.2
- 1986 13 & Over Girls Cruiser Grandnational Champion. This was the very first race of this class.
- 1987 13 & Over Girls Cruiser Grandnational Champion.
- Retired for 16 years (1988–2004) Restarted racing 2004
- 2006 36-40 Women Cruiser National No.1

*The ABA International Super Bowl of BMX was a series of 33 qualifying races around the country culminating in a Championship race in Toledo, Ohio. To qualify a racer had to participate in one of the 33 races in the series. Then the qualifiers participate in three Double point races in Ohio a day before the finals. The main event qualifiers will then be trimmed down to the sixteen riders with the most points via tabulation. Those 16 will make up the Simis for the Triple point Super Bowl race event itself with the qualifiers from those semis racing for the title in the main. Each Super Bowl main amateur or Pro was run three times to determine the champion in his/her class.

Fédération Internationale Amateur de Cyclisme (FIAC)*

- None

International Bicycle Motocross Federation (IBMXF)*

- 1981 10-11 Powder Puff International Champion.

Union Cycliste Internationale (UCI)*

- 2007 35-39 Women Cruiser World Champion

USA Cycling

- 1981 JAG 10-11 Powder Puff World Champion (fastest personal lap time: 29.93 seconds)
- 2007 35-39 USAC Women's Cruiser World Champion

*Note: Beginning in 1991 the IBMXF and FIAC had been holding joint World Championship events as a transitional phase in merging which began in earnest in 1993. Beginning with the 1996 season the IBMXF and FIAC completed the merger and both ceased to exist as independent entities being integrated into the UCI. Beginning with the 1997 World Championships held in Brighton, England the UCI would officially hold and sanction BMX World Championships and with it inherited all precedents, records, streaks, etc. from both the IBMXF and FIAC.

==== Professional ====
- No professional career

==== Notable Accolades ====
Inducted into the BMX Hall of Fame, Female Racer - 2014

=== Significant injuries ===
- Suffered a three to four inch Type 4 AC left shoulder separation and one broken finger on her right hand in a crash in the first turn at the ABA Mid-West Nationals in Rockford, Illinois on June 21, 2009 (Day 2). She is currently awaiting surgery which will involve installing titanium screws in a procedure called "Tightrope" and is expected to be out five months returning for the 2009 ABA Grand National in late November 2009.

=== Miscellaneous ===
- She was the second female to perform a bicycle evaluation for a major BMX magazine when she tested a GT Mach One for the December 1985 issue of BMX Action Misty Dong was the first when she evaluated the Raleigh R6000 in the February 1984 issue of Super BMX magazine.
- She won the first 13 & over Girls Cruiser class which was introduced at the 1986 ABA Grandnationals as a test/exhibition event Michelle Gibson won for 12 & Under Girls Cruiser. Amateur Girls cruiser began as a full competitive division in the following season of 1987.

== BMX magazine covers ==
Note: Only magazines that were in publication at the time of the racer's career(s) are listed unless specifically noted.

Minicycle/BMX Action & Super BMX:

- None

Bicycle Motocross Action & Go:

- None

BMX Plus!:

- None

Total BMX:

Bicycles and Dirt: (published by the ABA)

- None

BMX World (2005 version):

Bicycles Today & BMX Today (The official NBL publication under two names):

ABA Action, American BMXer, BMXer (The official ABA publication under three names):

=== Death ===
Deanna passed on June 22, 2015 after a brief battle with cancer.
