= Danny Nelson =

American bicycle motocross rider (born 1975)

Personal information
- Full name: Daniel Lee Nelson
- Nickname: "Thunder"
- Born: May 3, 1975 (age 51) Simi Valley, California, U.S.
- Height: 1.93 m (6 ft 4 in)
- Weight: 90.7 kg (200 lb)

Cycling career
- Sport: Cycling
- Current team: Retired
- Discipline: Bicycle Motocross (BMX)
- Role: Racer
- Rider type: Off Road

Amateur teams
- 1981-1983: Robinson Racing
- 1983-1986: GT Racing
- 1987-1991: Robinson Racing
- 1991-1992: GT Bicycles
- 1992: Powerlite Industries

Professional teams
- 1992-2000: Powerlite Industries
- 2000-2001: Hot Wheels/GT Bicycles/TL Designs
- 2001: Troy Lee Designs
- 2001-2003: Giant/Troy Lee Designs

Daniel Lee Nelson (born May 3, 1975 in Simi Valley, California, U.S.) is a former American professional "Mid & Current School" Bicycle Motocross (BMX) racer whose prime competitive years are from 1993 to 2003. His nickname is "Thunder".

== Racing career milestones ==
Note: Professional first are on the national level unless otherwise indicated.

Started racing: In 1981 at six years of age at the Teen Center in Van Nuys, California. He was riding with older kids one day and since they appreciated his talent of being "the wheelie king" of the neighborhood at such a young age they suggested he try racing.

Sanctioning body:

Home sanctioning body district(s): American Bicycle Association (ABA) California District 20 (CA-20) (1985); United States Bicycle Motocross Association (USBA) CA-2 (1986)

First race result: Nelson does not recall how well he did overall but he was leading his first moto but went back up the starting hill which was parallel to the straight. He simply did it automatically and without thinking since it was accidentally ingrained into him during the practice sessions previous to the race to avoid the ride back to the starting hill that would be necessary if he ran the entire track in practice.

First win (local):

First sponsor: Robinson Racing 1981.

First national win:

Turned Professional: December 1992 age 17.

First Professional race result:

First Professional win:

First Junior Pro* race result:

First Junior Pro win:

First Senior Pro** race result:

First Senior Pro win:

Retired: October 2003, just after the NBL Grandnationals. to devote himself to a new business he was partnered in. He made his formal announcement in a speech to the spectators to the ABA Fall Nationals in Del Mar, California on October 26, 2003 stating it was time to move on.

Height & weight at height of her career: Ht:6'4" Wt:200 lbs.

*In the NBL "B" Pro/Super Class/"A" Pro/Junior Elite Men depending on the era; in the ABA it is "A" Pro.
**In the NBL it is "AA" Pro/Elite Men; in the ABA it is "AA" Pro.

=== Career factory and major bike shop sponsors ===
Note: This listing only denotes the racer's primary sponsors. At any given time a racer could have numerous co-sponsors. Primary sponsorships can be verified by BMX press coverage and sponsor's advertisements at the time in question. When possible exact dates are given.

==== Amateur ====
- Robinson Racing: 1981-Early November 1983
- GT (Gary Turner) Racing: Early November 1983-December 1986
- Robinson Racing: January 1987-November 1991
- GT Bicycles: November 1991-December 1992. GT underwent a minor name change since his first term with GT.
- Powerlite Industries: December 1992-December 2000. Nelson will turn pro with this sponsor.

==== Professional ====
- Powerlite Industries: December 1992-December 2000
- Hot Wheels/GT Bicycles/Troy Lee Designs: December 2000-October 2001
- Troy Lee Designs: October 2001-Mid December 2001. Troy Lee became Nelson's primary sponsor between GT and Giant.
- Giant/Troy Lee: Late December 2001-October 2003. After the NBL Grand Nationals just before Giant Bicycles dropped the Professional members of its team. He would retire within weeks to pursue a business opportunity.

=== Career bicycle motocross titles ===
Note: Listed are District, State/Provincial/Department, Regional, National, and International titles in italics. "Defunct" refers to the fact of that sanctioning body in question no longer existing at the start of the racer's career or at that stage of his/her career. Depending on point totals of individual racers, winners of Grand Nationals do not necessarily win National titles. Series and one off Championships are also listed in block.

==== Amateur ====
National Bicycle Association (NBA)

- None

National Bicycle League (NBL)

- 1982 7 Expert Grandnational Champion
- 1990 16 Cruiser Grandnational Champion
- 1991 17 Expert and 17 Cruiser Grandnational Champion
- 1991 17 Expert National No.2
- 1992 17-20 Cruiser Grandnational Champion

American Bicycle Association (ABA)

- 1982 8 Expert 2nd Place Jag World Champion (ABA sanctioned)
- 1985 10 Expert Winter Season California District 20 (CA-20) District Age Group (DAG) No.1
- 1985 11 Expert Grandnational Champion
- 1985 11 Expert National No.1†
- 1986 12 Cruiser California District 20 (Cal-20) No.1
- 1992 18 Expert and 17-20 Cruiser Grandnational Champion

†Beginning in the 1985 season the ABA made it possible to earn an amateur national no.1 plate in the age group of the racer, similar to NBL practice. However, the ABA still had an overall National No.1 amateur which was J. Brent Romero in 1985.

United States Bicycle Motocross Association (USBA)

- None

International Bicycle Motocross Federation (IBMXF)*

- 1982 7 Expert Grand Prix of BMX Champion

Fédération Internationale Amateur de Cyclisme (FIAC)*

Union Cycliste Internationale (UCI)*

- None

*See note in professional section.

Other Titles:

- 1983 9 Expert Jag World Champion (Non sanctioned)

==== Professional ====
National Bicycle Association (NBA)

- None

National Bicycle League (NBL)

- 1994 All Pro Grandnational Champion
- 1999 National No.1 Pro

American Bicycle Association (ABA)

- 2002 "AA" Pro Grandnational Champion
- 2002 National No.1 Pro

United States Bicycle Motocross Association (USBA)

- None (defunct)

International Bicycle Motocross Federation (IBMXF)*

- None

Fédération Internationale Amateur de Cyclisme (FIAC)*

- None

Union Cycliste Internationale (UCI)*

- 1994 Superclass 20" World Champion.

*Note: Beginning in 1991 the IBMXF and FIAC, the amateur cycling arm of the UCI, had been holding joint World Championship events as a transitional phase in merging which began in earnest in 1993. Beginning with the 1996 season the IBMXF and FIAC completed the merger and both ceased to exist as independent entities being integrated into the UCI. Beginning with the 1996 World Championships held in Brighton, England the UCI would officially hold and sanction BMX World Championships and with it inherited all precedents, records, streaks, etc. from both the IBMXF and FIAC.

Pro Series Championships

=== BMX product lines ===
- Robinson "Danny Nelson Jr. Pro" Mini 20" bicycle introduced 1982.

Product Evaluations:

=== Notable accolades ===
- He is an ABA BMXer magazine 1993 Golden Crank Pro Rookie of the Year winner.
- He is a winner of the 1999 VISA/USAC Athletes of the Year Award. He also received US$1,000 in prize money.

=== Significant injuries ===
- Suffered a knee injury high jumping at school in approximately May 1985. Injury side lined him until the ABA Grand Nationals in November 1985.
- Had post season knee surgery in December 1990.
- Inflamed knee in late summer of 1992. Missed the ABA Midwest nationals but was back by the next ABA national.
- Pulled his groin in the Summer of 1999. He was laid up for one race, coming back for the ABA Mile High Nationals.

== Post BMX career ==
- Nelson retired immediately after the 2003 NBL Grandnationals ending his 23-year career to pursue a business opportunity of being a partner in a thrift store. His workload of helping to run this new business and racing was impacting both his opportunity with the business and racing. As he said at the time in an interview that was printed in the February 2004 issue of Transworld BMX:

TWBMX: You're #2 in ABA Points; why are you retiring now?
Nelson: "In a perfect world, I would have liked to have finished out the season to see if I could have defended the title, but this other opportunity came up. It's where my future's headed; I couldn't afford to put it on hold or wait around to get to it. I had to do it now."
TWBMX: What opportunity is that?
Nelson: "It's a thrift store deal that I'm working on down in Long Beach. It's a large operation, it's a lot of work, and we've got a long way to go with it, but we've been open five weeks now and things are on track. Now it's just a matter of plugging away and getting it to where we want it to be."

The full, illustrated website version of the interview, originally posted on January 8, 2004, can be seen here.

== BMX and general press magazine interviews and articles ==
- "Around the States in 48 days" BMX Action December 1987 Vol.12 No.12 pg.58 Mini interview conducted along with teammates "Chicken" George Severs and Robert Swick also interviewed while the GT Racing team was on tour during the summer of 1987.
- "The Quiet Sound of Thunder..." Snap BMX Magazine July/August 1997 Vol.4 No.4 Iss.17 pg.53
- "Danny Nelson: Heavy Thunder and New Reign" Snap BMX Magazine January 2000 Vol.7 Iss.1 No.39 pg.78
- "Thunder Rolls Out" Transworld BMX February 2004 Vol.11 Iss.2 No.88 pg.17 Brief article on reason for Nelson's retirement.

== BMX magazine covers ==
Note: (defunct) denotes that the magazine was out of business before the career of the racer started.

Bicycle Motocross News:

- None (defunct)

Minicycle/BMX Action & Super BMX:

- None

Bicycle Motocross Action & Go:

- February 1991 Vol.2 Iss.4 in center in with freestyler Todd Lyons in the left insert and freestyler Ron Wilkerson in the right insert. (Go)

BMX Plus!:

- December 1993 Vol.16 No.12 (51) ahead of Steve Veltman. In insert freestyler Dave Mirra.
- June 1998 Vol.21 No.6 (6) with Kiyomi Waller (18).

Total BMX:

Bicycles and Dirt:

- None

Snap BMX Magazine & Transworld BMX:

- Snap BMX Magazine May/June 1996 Vol.3 Iss.3 No.10 Launching of the starting gate with Mike King (25) directly to his left. To his right is Six unidentified racers. Waiting his turn on the starting gate directly behind Mike King is Greg Romero (6).
- Snap BMX Magazine May 2000 Vol.7 Iss.5 No.43 (1) slightly behind Matt Pohlkamp (7) and Eric Abbadessa (9). In top insert Brian Foster.

Twenty BMX:

Moto Mag:

- None

BMX World:

NBA World & NBmxA World (The official NBA/NBmxA publication):

Bicycles Today & BMX Today (The official NBL publication; one name change):

- June 1983 (BToday)

ABA Action, American BMXer, BMXer (Three incarnations of the official ABA publication):

- American BMXer June 1985 Vol.7 No.4

USBA Racer (The official USBA membership publication):
