= Darrell Young =

American BMX racer (born 1966)

Personal information
- Full name: Darrell Young
- Nickname: Mr. Smooth
- Born: May 7, 1966 (age 60) Clackamas, Oregon, U.S.

Cycling career
- Sport: Cycling
- Current team: Retired
- Discipline: Bicycle Motocross (BMX)
- Role: Racer
- Rider type: Off Road

Amateur teams
- 1979: Bob's Bikes
- 1979-1980: GT Racing Support Team
- 1980: RRS
- 1981-1984: JMC Racing Equipment

Professional teams
- 1984-1985: JMC Racing Equipment
- 1985: Bike Gallery
- 1985-1986: Kuwahara Cycles, Ltd.
- 1986: Bike Gallery
- 1986: X-Caliber
- 1987: First Class BMX
- 1988: Titan
- 1990: Oregon ELF
- 1990: N W Kastan
- 1991-1992: R&C Racing
- 1992: QuickSilver/Bomber
- 1992-1999: SE Racing
- 2000-?: North Woods BMX
- 2003-?: Supercross
- 2005: Arrow Racing

Darrell Young (born May 7, 1966 in Clackamas, Oregon U.S.) is a former American "Old School" professional Bicycle Motocross (BMX) racer whose prime competitive years were from 1981–1988 and 1991 to 1994.

== Racing career milestones ==
Note: Professional first are on the national level unless otherwise indicated.

Started racing: In June 1979 at the age of 13 at the Y-BMX track, in Gladstone, Oregon As it happens with many BMX racers a friend, Tim Murnane, talked him into racing.

Sanctioning body:

First race result: First Place 13 novice.

First win (local): See above.

First sponsor: Bob's Bike Shop.

First National race result: First place in 13 Expert in the 1979 American Bicycle Association (ABA) Fall nationals in Tacoma, Washington. He also won 11-13 Trophy Dash and a third in Open Class.

First National win: See above

Turned professional: June 1984 at age 18.

First Professional race result: He first raced a local track summer Series and emerged undefeated. In his first Professional national he came in first place in "A" Pro at the American Bicycle Association (ABA) Mile High Nationals in Denver, Colorado on July 1, 1984. He won US$240. This is equivalent to US$475.15 in 2007 dollars.Cost of living Calculator

First Professional win: See above.

First Junior Pro* win: See above.

First Senior Pro** race result: Eighth place in "AA" Pro at the ABA Lumberjack Nationals in Clackamas, Oregon on August 25, 1985. He won US$30. (US$59.39 2007)

First Senior Pro win: In "A" pro at the NBL National in Fort Wayne, Indiana on July 16, 1988 Due to injuries and sponsorship troubles it took approximately two years, ten months, and three weeks to get his first senior pro win.

Retired:

Height & weight at height of career (1990): Ht: Wt:lbs.

*In the NBL "B"/"Superclass"/"A" pro (depending on the era); in the ABA "A" pro.
**In the NBL "A"/"Elite Men"/"AA" pro (depending on the era); in the ABA "AA" pro.

=== Career factory and major bike shop sponsors ===
Note: This listing only denotes the racer's primary sponsors. At any given time a racer could have numerous ever-changing co-sponsors. Primary sponsorships can be verified by BMX press coverage and sponsor's advertisements at the time in question. When possible exact dates are used.

==== Amateur ====
- Bob's Bikes: Late June 1979-October 1979
- GT (Gary Turner) Racing Support Team: October 1979-April 1980
- RRS (Riverside-Redlands Schwinn) (bike shop): April 1980-December 1980.
- JMC (James Melton Cyclery) Racing Equipment: January 1981-June 1985. Darrell would turn pro with this sponsor.

==== Professional ====
- JMC Racing Equipment: Early 1981-July 1985. JMC went out of business in July 1985 after 11 years of being a bicycle component and later a complete bicycle manufacturer.
- Bike Gallery (bike shop): July 1985-October 1985 This was a bike shop that had co-sponsored him back during his tenure with JMC.
- Kuwahara Cycles, Ltd.: October 1985-May 1986. The February 1987 issue of Super BMX & Freestyle magazine implies he resigned in May 1986. due to a personality dispute with the Kuwahara team manager Denny Henderson. "Kuwahara" is Japanese for Mulberry Meadows. The company is named after Sentaro Kuwahara who founded the company in 1916 in Osaka, Japan.
- Bike Gallery (bike shop): May 1986-September 1986. Once again he was back with The Bike Gallery became his primary sponsor while he looked for a factory sponsorship.
- KASL Racing: Sometime in between here. KASL Racing was a small private team from Portland, OR/Vancouver, WA that was started by Lesa Angelo and Ken Hicks (the "K" and "L" of KASL. The "A" and "S" stand for Albert and Sheldon, Lesa's two sons). They provided a jersey for Darrell to wear and paid some of his entry fees during the summer including the ABA Great Northwest Nationals in Eugene, OR.
- X-Caliber: September 1986-December 1986
- First Class BMX (Bicycle shop): Mid July 1987-
- Titan: Early February 1988-
- Oregon ELF (Extra Light Frames): -Late April 1990
- Northwest Kastan: Late April 1990-December 1990. The entire Oregon ELF team went over to NW Kastan in April 1990.
- R&C Racing: January 1991-Mid 1992
- Quick Silver/Bomber: Mid 1992-Late November 1992
- SE (formerly Scot Enterprises now Sports Engineering) Racing: Late November 1992 – 1999. The 1992 ABA Grandnationals was his first race for SE Racing.
- North Woods BMX: 2000-
- Supercross: November 2003-
- Arrow Racing: 2005

=== Career bicycle motocross titles ===
Note: Listed are District, State/Provincial/Department, Regional, National, and International titles in italics. "Defunct" refers to the fact of that sanctioning body in question no longer existing at the start of the racer's career or at that stage of his/her career. Depending on point totals of individual racers, winners of Grand Nationals do not necessarily win National titles. Series and one off Championships are also listed in block.

==== Amateur ====
National Bicycle Association (NBA)

National Bicycle League (NBL)

American Bicycle Association (ABA)

- 1981 15 Expert Oregon No.1
- 1982 16 Expert, 15-25 Cruiser & Overall Amateur Northwest Gold Cup Champion
- 1982 16 Expert Utah All-State Champion
- 1982 15-25 Cruiser Jag World Champion (ABA Sanctioned)

United States Bicycle Motocross Association (USBA)

- None

International Bicycle Motocross Federation (IBMXF)

- 1982 15* Expert World Champion

*Under IBMXF rules at the time you stayed in the same age division as according to how old you were on January 1 even though you would have an intervening birthday during the racing season. Therefore, Darrell Young was still a 15 expert in July 1982 despite turning 16 the previous May.

==== Professional ====
National Bicycle Association (NBA)

- None

National Bicycle League (NBL)

- None

American Bicycle Association (ABA)

- 1987 Pro Oregon State Champion
- 1990 Oregon Governors Cup Pro Champion
- 1990 Canadian Amateur BMX Association (CABA)* Grandnational Champion
- 1990 Pro Cruiser National No.3
- 1991 Pro Cruiser National No.3
- 1992 Pro Cruiser National No. 1
- 1993 Pro Cruiser National No.2

*The Canadian Amateur BMX Association, formerly known as the Canadian American Bicycle Association was the Canadian affiliate of the ABA.

United States Bicycle Motocross Association (USBA)

- None

International Bicycle Motocross Federation (IBMXF)

- None

Pro Series Championships

=== BMX product lines ===
- JMC Racing Equipment introduced the Darrell Young Design Signature Series Frame, Fork and Handlebars on October 24, 1983.
  - Magazine evaluations:

Bicycles and Dirt March 1984 Vol.2 No.6 pg.42
Super BMX February 1984 Vol.11 No.2 pg.61 (Description only)
Super BMX April 1984 Vol.11 No.4 pg.78 (Full testing and evaluation)

=== Notable accolades ===
- Named one of the "Terrible Ten", BMX Action's pick of fastest amateur racers in the world in 1983
- Darrell Young is a 2003 ABA BMX Hall of Fame Inductee.

=== Significant injuries ===
- He had back-to-back collarbone breaks in the summer of 1981. The first was at the ABA Great Salt Lake National in Salt Lake City, Utah on June 28, 1981. He was laid up for approximately five weeks. Six weeks after that first break he rebroke it in mid August at a national while jumping between motos and trying to avoid landing on a young racer also practicing. He was laid up again until late September.
- Broke ankle in early January 1982 in an Australian skatepark. Laid up five weeks until the ABA Winternationals in Chandler, Arizona held on February 13 and 14.

=== Miscellaneous ===
Darrell Young's racing career was in full swing. He had recently won the ABA's National #1 Cruiser title. Unfortunately in a state championship race, he got tangled up fighting for the lead spot with an A Pro local, Glen Cook in a main event. Both riders went down, but Darrell Young received a career ending broken hip injury. It was somewhat of a tragic event, because these two riders were rumored to be friends.

Young also competed in downhill mountain bike racing and won several regional and state downhill races in the Northwest, including the State Games of Oregon downhill race held on the legendary high speed Cannonball downhill race course.

== BMX press magazine interviews and articles ==
- "Darrell Young" Bicycle Motocross Action February 1982 Vol.7 No.2 pg.22 Side bar.
- "JMC's Darrell Young: An Interview with a True Champion" Super BMX February 1984 Vol.11 No.2 pg.54
- "JMC & Darrell Young" Bicycles and Dirt March 1984 Vol.2 No.6 pg.40
- "Back in the day: Darrell Young" BMX World August/September 2006 Vol.1 Iss.5 pg.14

== BMX magazine covers ==
Bicycle Motocross News:

- None

Minicycle/BMX Action & Super BMX:

- February 1984 Vol.11 No.2. In insert "Miss Mongoose" Austin Taylor poses with "Fubar The Robot", Super BMX's prop radio control robot mascot. In the centerfold Young is posing with celebrity soap opera actress Andrea Evans-Massey.(SBMX)

Bicycle Motocross Action & Go:

- August 1986 Vol.11 No.8 (BMXA)

BMX Plus!:

Total BMX:

Bicycles and Dirt:

- March 1984 Vol.2 No.6

Snap BMX Magazine & Transworld BMX:

NBA World & NBmx World (The NBA/NBmxA official membership publication):

Bicycles Today & BMX Today (The NBL official membership publication under two names):

ABA Action, American BMXers, BMXer (The ABA official membership publication under three names):

USBA Racer (The official USBA membership publication):

== Notes ==
https://www.pinkbike.com/news/mt-hood-downhill-series-3-2007.html
