= Alice Jung =

South Korean BMX racer

Personal information
- Full name: Alice Jung
- Nickname: "Feisty"
- Born: April 23, 1982 (age 44) South Korea

Cycling career
- Sport: Cycling
- Current team: Retired
- Discipline: Bicycle Motocross (BMX)
- Role: Racer
- Rider type: Off Road

Amateur team
- 1998-1999: Bauer Power Racing

Professional teams
- 1999-2001: Bauer Power Racing
- 2001-2002: Hyper
- 2002: Prodigy Racing
- 2002-2003: Enigma
- 2003-2005: Free Agent

Alice Jung (born April 23, 1982) is a former professional "Current School" Bicycle Motocross (BMX) racer whose prime competitive years are from 1996 to 2005. Had the moniker of "Feisty".

== Racing career milestone ==
Note: Professional first are on the national level unless otherwise indicated.

Started racing: February 1996 at age 13. She got a BMX bicycle in lieu of a mountain bike due to lack of funds. When she was 13 years old her father gave her $250 for the mountain bike she wanted for Christmas in 1995. To her disappointment she did not have enough for a mountain bike but did have enough for a BMX bicycle, which she settled for. Then she was informed about BMX racing by the salesman and the existence of a nearby BMX track. She was enthralled when she road her new bike in practice on the course. However, she was too apprehensive to actually sign up for a membership and race for a month.

First race bike: Dyno Nitro. This was the bike she brought instead of the mountain bike.

First race result: Did not qualify (DNQ) in 13 Novice.

Sanctioning body:

Home sanctioning body district(s):

First win (local):

First sponsor:

First national win:

Turned Professional: 1999

First Professional race result:

First Professional win:

First Junior Women* race result:

First Junior Women Pro win:

First Elite Women** race result:

First Elite Women win:

Retired: Her last race was the ABA Grand Nationals in Tulsa, Oklahoma, on November 27, 2005. She came in fifth place in Pro Girl class. Her last national victories were in Pro Girl on both days at the ABA Fallnationals in Phoenix, Arizona, on October 29 and 30, 2005.

Height and weight at height of her career (): Ht:" Wt:lbs.

*In the NBL/UCI Junior Women; No comparable level exist in the ABA.
**In the NBL/UCI it was/is Supergirls/Elite Women; in the ABA it is Pro Girls.

=== Career factory and major bike shop sponsors ===
Note: This listing only denotes the racer's primary sponsors. At any given time a racer could have numerous ever changing co-sponsors. Primary sponsorships can be verified by BMX press coverage and sponsor's advertisements at the time in question. When possible exact dates are given.

==== Amateur/Junior women ====
- Bauer Power Racing: 1998-Late March 2001. Jung would turn professional with this sponsor.

==== Professional/Elite Women ====
- Bauer Power Racing: 1998-Late March 2001
- Hyper Bicycles/Dope BMX: March 25, 2001 – May 22, 2002. Jung along with her partner Mike Gul left Hyper on good terms believing it was time to move on.
- Prodigy Racing: May 22, 2002-December 2002
- Enigma Racing: December 2002-October 2003
- Free Agent: October 2003-November 27, 2005.

=== Career bicycle motocross titles ===
Note: Listed are District, State/Provincial/Department, Regional, National, and International titles in italics. Depending on point totals of individual racers, winners of Grand Nationals do not necessarily win National titles. Only sanctioning bodies active during the racer's career are listed.

==== Amateur/Junior Women ====
National Bicycle League (NBL)

- None

American Bicycle Association (ABA)

- 1997, 98, 99 Girls Arizona State Champion
- 1999 17 Girls Gold Cup Champion
- 1999 17 Girls Race of Champions Champion.
- 1999 17 Girls National No.2

Union Cycliste Internationale (UCI)

- None

==== Professional/Elite Women ====
National Bicycle League (NBL)

- None

American Bicycle Association (ABA)

- 2000 Pro Girls National No.2
- 2001 Pro Girls World Champion
- 2002 Pro Girls Grandnational Champion
- 2001, 2002 National No.1 Pro Girl

Union Cycliste Internationale (UCI)

- 2003 Elite Women Bronze Medal World Champion

Pro Series Championships

=== Significant injuries ===
- Broke her collar bone and fractured tail bone the weekend of April 29, 2001. She was laid up until The American Bicycle Association's (ABA) Dixieland Nationals held during the weekend of June 10, 2001
- Broke collar bone in July 2002.
- Had a back injury in early 2003
- Broke collarbone at the NBL Tarheal National in North Carolina in May 2003
- Broke collarbone for the sixth time at the NBL Easter Classic in Sarasota, Florida, on April 11, 2004, in which she crashed in turn two. She still managed to race the main.
- Broke collarbone at the NBL Tar Heel National in Clemmons, North Carolina, on May 28, 2005.

=== Miscellaneous ===
- Jung became the first female Pro to win the ABA's Girls Pro division title twice and also consecutively: 2001 and 2002
- In 2003 Jung, along with fellow racer Arielle Martin, became one of the first female racers to perform a back flip jump.

== Post BMX career ==
- Jung retired after the 2005 ABA Grandnationals (coming in 5th in Women's pro on day 2) to concentrate on her college studies.

== BMX press magazine interviews and articles ==
- "Interview: Alice Jung" Transworld BMX April 2003 Vol.10 Iss.4 No.78 pg.58

== BMX magazine covers ==
Note: Only magazines that were in publication at the time of the racer's career(s) are listed unless specifically noted.

BMX Plus!:

Snap BMX Magazine & Transworld BMX:

- None

Bicycles Today & BMX Today (The official NBL publication of the ABA under two different names):

ABA Action, American BMXer, BMXer (The official publication of the ABA under three different names):
