= Cindy Davis =

American BMX rider

Personal information
- Full name: Cindy Davis
- Nickname: "Loopy"
- Born: January 1977 (age 49) Atwater, California, U.S.

Cycling career
- Sport: Cycling
- Current team: Retired
- Discipline: Bicycle Motocross (BMX)
- Role: Racer
- Rider type: Off Road

Amateur teams
- 1986–1987: Ralph's Bicycles
- 1987: Radical Rascals
- 1987–1988: White Bear
- 1988: Ralph's Bicycles
- 1988–1990: Tru Color/Titan Racing
- 1991–1992: R&C Racing
- 1994: GT Racing
- 1995: Hyper
- 1996: Free Agent
- 1996–1998: Odyssey

Professional team
- 1998: Odyssey

Cindy Davis (born January 1977 from Atwater, California, United States) is a retired professional American Bicycle Motocross (BMX) racer whose prime competitive years were from (1988–1998). She was the first woman to win five American Bicycle Association (ABA) cups in a row, and the first rider to own five Number One Cups (over both 20 inch and Girls Cruiser). She was founding member of ABA's Girl Pro class. An accumulation of injuries in 1998 ended her career. During the course of her career she achieved 350 National wins. She got the moniker of "Loopy" when at the 1989 ABA Grandnationals in her 12 girls main. She applied so much power down the first straight she looped out, i.e. did an uncontrolled "wheelie", over balanced and fell backward onto her back, a maneuver that resembled a plane doing a half loop. Due to this crash she lost her bid to repeat as national no.1 girl.

== Racing career milestones ==
Note: Professional first are on the national level unless otherwise indicated.

Milestone	Event details
Started racing:	In April 1984 at seven years old at the Orion Park BMX track in Mountain View, California. She earned 40 district points for April 1984 indicating she was just starting out. She started racing on the national level in early 1985.
Sanctioning body:	American Bicycle Association (ABA)
Home sanctioning body district(s):	ABA: California District 15 (CA-15) 1984, CA-19 1985 and CA-10 1986–1993
First national win:	In 9 Girls at the ABA Liberty Nationals in North Bergen, New Jersey on July 13, 1986 (Day 2). There were only two girls in the class, Davis, and Kelly Schiebel. The previous day in Deptford Township, New Jersey, Davis came in second place in 10 Girls (there were no other girls aged nine attending to form a two racer class with Davis) to Mapuana Naki.
Turned Professional:	Early 1998 at 20 years old. The American Bicycle Association (ABA) started its first ever Woman's Professional Division in 1998 with the 1998 ABA Winternationals in Phoenix, Arizona. While both a Girl's Pro 20 inch and Pro Cruiser was created, only the Pro 20 inch class had a year end no.1 plate.
Height and weight at height of her career :	
Retired:	1998 due to injuries.

=== Career factory and major bike shop sponsors ===
Note: This listing only denotes the racer's primary sponsors. At any given time a racer could have numerous ever-changing co-sponsors. Primary sponsorships can be verified by BMX press coverage and sponsor's advertisements at the time in question. When possible exact dates are used.

==== Amateur ====
- Ralph's Bicycles: 1986-Mid 1987
- Radical Rascals: Mid 1987-October 1987
- White Bear: October 1987-Late July 1988
- Ralph's Bicycles: Early August 1988-November 1988
- Tru Color/Titan Racing: December 1988-Early December 1990. After the 1990 ABA Grandnationals the Tru Color/Titan Racing team was disbanded.
- R & C Racing: January 1991-thru December 1992
- GT Racing: January 1994-December 1994
- Hyper: 1995
- Free Agent: January 1996-December 1996
- Odyssey: November 1996 – 1998

==== Professional ====
- Odyssey: November 1996 – 1998

=== Career bicycle motocross titles ===
Note: Listed are District, State/Provincial/Department, Regional, National, and International titles in italics. Depending on point totals of individual racers, winners of Grand Nationals do not necessarily win National titles. Only sanctioning bodies active during the racer's career are listed. Series and one off Championships are also listed in block.

==== Amateur ====
National Bicycle League (NBL)

- None

American Bicycle Association (ABA)

- 1984 7-8 Girls California State Champion
- 1984 California District #15 (CA-15) No.1 Girl
- 1985 8 Girls Summer Season CA-19 No.1 Girl (DAG)
- 1985 Summer Season CA-19 No.1 Girl
- 1985 CA-19 No.1 Girl
- 1986 9 Girls Race of Champions Champion
- 1986 CA-19 No.1 Girl
- 1987 CA-10 No.1 Girl
- 1987 10 Girls Superbowl of BMX Champion West
- 1987 10 Girls Gold Cup West Champion.
- 1987 10 Girls Northern California State Champion
- 1987 10 Girls Race of Champions Champion
- 1987 10 Girls National No.2 Girl
- 1988 California District #10 (CA-10) No.1 Girl
- 1988 11 Girls Northern California State Champion
- 1988 11 Girls Race of Champions Champion
- 1988 11 Girls and 12 & Under Girls Cruiser Grandnational Champion
- 1988 12 & Under Cruiser National No.2
- 1988 11 Girls NAG and National No.1 Girl. She won a Yamaha MX motorcycle with the national girls title.
- 1989 12 Girls Gold Cup West Champion.
- 1989 12 Girl Northern California State Champion
- 1989 13 & Under Girls Cruiser Grandnational Champion
- 1989 California District #10 (CA-10) No.1 Girl
- 1989 12 Girls Race of Champions Champion.
- 1989 12 & Under Girls Cruiser No.1 (NAG)
- 1989 National Girls Cruiser No.2
- 1989 National Girls No.3
- 1990 13 Girls Gold Cup West Champion
- 1990 California District #10 (CA-10) No.1 Girl
- 1990 13 & Over Girls Cruiser Race of Champions Champion.
- 1990 13 Girls and 13 & Over Girls Cruiser Grandnational Champion
- 1990 Girls Cruiser National No.3 Overall and 13 & Over Girls Cruiser National No.2 NAG
- 1991 14 Girls Gold Cup West Champion
- 1991 14 Girls U.S Open West Champion
- 1991 14 Girls and 14 & Over Girls Cruiser Grandnational Champion.
- 1991 National No.1 Girl Cruiser
- 1992 15 Girls and 14 & Over Girls Cruiser Race of Champions Champion
- 1992 15 & Over Girls East-Vs-West Shootout Champion
- 1993 California District #10 (CA-10) Girls Cruiser No.1
- 1993 National No.1 Girl Cruiser
- 1994 17 & Over Girls and 17 & Over Girls Cruiser World Cup Champion
- 1994 17 & Over Girls US Open East Champion
- 1994 17 & Over Girls Gold Cup East Champion
- 1994 National No.1 Girl Cruiser
- 1995 17 & Over Girls Grandnational Champion
- 1995 National No.1 Girl
- 1995, 1996 17 & Over Girls World Cup Champion
- 1996 17 & Over Girls Grandnational Champion

United States Bicycle Motocross Association (USBA)

Fédération Internationale Amateur de Cyclisme (FIAC)*

- None

International Bicycle Motocross Federation (IBMXF)*

Union Cycliste Internationale (UCI)*

- 1994 17 Junior Women World Champion.

*See note in professional section

==== Professional ====
National Bicycle League (NBL)

American Bicycle Association (ABA)

United States Bicycle Motocross Association (USBA)

- None

International Bicycle Motocross Federation (IBMXF)*

- None

Fédération Internationale Amateur de Cyclisme (FIAC)*

- None (FIAC did not have a strictly professional division during its existence)

Union Cycliste Internationale (UCI)*

*Note: Beginning in 1991 the IBMXF and FIAC had been holding joint World Championship events as a transitional phase in merging which began in earnest in 1993. Beginning with the 1996 season the IBMXF and FIAC completed the merger and both ceased to exist as independent entities being integrated into the UCI. Beginning with the 1997 World Championships held in Brighton, England the UCI would officially hold and sanction BMX World Championships and with it inherited all precedents, records, streaks, etc. from both the IBMXF and FIAC.

Pro Series Championships

=== Notable accolades ===
- BMXtreme article Named 12th of the Top 90 BMXers of the 90's

=== Significant injuries ===
- Due to injuries to her knees she retired in 1998

=== Racing habits and traits ===
- She had great gate starts getting the "snap" i.e. the lead literally right out of the gate (a.k.a. "the holeshot"). The July 1991 issue of American BMXer in its coverage of the ABA Spring Nationals (held on the weekend of May 26, 1991 in Napa, California) noted how despite her diminutive size and youth if she got the lead out of the gate the much larger, presumably stronger 19-year-old Christy Homa would find it difficult to pass the 14-year-old when they raced 14 & Over Girls Cruiser Class together:

:"It looks like a remake of Davey and Goliath, with girls playing the parts. Cindy and Goliath? No, how about Cindy and Homa...the little, eensy-weensy 14 year old R&C racer versus the great, aggro 19 year old Christy Homa (who's almost twice Davis's height). Davis gets killer starts, while Homa relies on strength down straightaways. If Christy can't pass, Cindy wins... like she did both days in 14 & over girls cruiser. Unbelievable!"

American BMXer noted her ability in this area again in their coverage of the ABA Mile High Nationals (held on the weekending June 16, 1991 in Greeley, Colorado) in the same issue:

"For a girl, she could probably out-snap four-out-of-five guys. Cindy gets radical starts out of the gate. Just watch her at the next national."

=== Miscellaneous ===
Billy Davis, Cindy Davis's elder brother was the youngest track official in the ABA in 1988. He was 13 years old at the time.

== BMX press magazine interviews and articles ==
- "Cindy Davis is #1 Girl" American BMXer June 1989 Vol.11 No.5 pg.26
- Gold Cup West mini interview. American BMXer November 1989 Vol.11 No.10 pg.15 Very brief interview taken after she won her third Gold Cup championship.

== BMX magazine covers ==
Note: Only magazines that were in publication at the time of the racer's career(s) are listed unless specifically noted.

Snap BMX Magazine & Transworld BMX:

BMX World (1990 version)

Bicycles Today & BMX Today (the official Membership publication of the NBL under two different names):

ABA Action, American BMXer, BMXer (the official BMX publication of the ABA under three different names):

- American BMXer June 1989 Vol.11 No.5
