= Robert MacPherson (BMX rider) =

American bicycle motocross rider (born 1971)

Personal information
- Full name: Robert D. MacPherson
- Nicknames: "MacFearsome", "Big Mac"
- Born: February 9, 1971 (age 55) Norwalk, California, United States

Cycling career
- Sport: Cycling
- Current team: Retired
- Discipline: Bicycle Motocross (BMX)
- Role: Racer
- Rider type: Off road

Amateur teams
- 1982: Valencia Schwinn
- 1983: Zap Clothing
- 1983-1985: Vans
- 1985-1986: CW Racing
- 1986-1994: Retired for eight years
- 1994-1995: Mongoose

Professional teams
- 1995-1998: Mongoose
- 1998-2001: Diamondback
- 2001-2002: Too Fitness/Diamonback
- 2002: Free Agent/O'Neal

Robert D. MacPherson (born February 9, 1971) is a retired professional American "Old/Mid School" Bicycle Motocross (BMX) racer who competed mainly from 1995 to 2001. His nicknames were "MacFearsome", and "Big Mac".

== Racing career milestones ==
Note: Professional firsts are on the national level unless otherwise indicated.

Started racing: MacPherson started racing in 1976 at the age of four, where crashed on his first lap around the track in practice. He didn't attempt to race again until 1981, and this time he did not qualify. In his third race he got fourth place. He had a successful child amateur career after that, and then left the sport in late 1986 at 15 years of age. He resumed racing in 1994 with the ABA Fall Nationals in Burbank, California, on October 21–23, 1994.

Sanctioning body district(s): American Bicycle Association (ABA) California 9 (CA-9) (1983), CA-22 (1985)

First race result: Did not qualify in 1981.

Turned professional: November 1995, moments after his victory in becoming National No.1 Amateur at the ABA grand nationals. He was 23 years old.

First professional race result: Eighth place (last) in Superclass at the National Bicycle League (NBL) Christmas Classic in Columbus, Ohio, on December 28, 1995 (Day 1).

Retired: MacPherson first retired after the 1986 ABA grand nationals to pursue football. He resumed racing in 1994 after an eight-year layoff at 23 years old. He missed the travel and camaraderie. He retired again in December 2002 to spend more time with his daughter.

=== Career factory and major bike shop sponsors ===
Note: This listing only denotes the racer's primary sponsors. At any given time a racer could have numerous ever-changing co-sponsors. Primary sponsorships can be verified by BMX press coverage and sponsor's advertisements at the time in question. When possible exact dates are used.

==== Amateur ====
- Valencia Schwinn: 1982
- Zap Clothing: 1983
- Vans: 1983-February 1985
- CW Racing:February 1985-November 1986. He retired after the 1986 ABA Grandnationals
- retired for 8 years (December 1986-Late 1994)
- Mongoose: May 1995-December 1998 He turned pro with this sponsor.

==== Professional ====
- Mongoose: May 1995-December 1998
- Diamond Back: December 1998 – 2001 The 1998 NBL Christmas Classic was his first race for Diamondback.
- To Fitness/Diamondback: 2001-2002
- Free Agent/O'Neal: 2002

=== Career Bicycle Motocross Titles. ===
Note: Listed are District, State/Provincial/Department, Regional, National, and International titles in italics. Depending on point totals of individual racers, winners of Grand Nationals do not necessarily win National titles. Only sanctioning bodies active during the racer's career are listed.

==== Amateur ====
National Bicycle Association (NBA)

- 1980 9 Novice Third Place Jag World Champion

National Bicycle League (NBL)

- 1981 10 Expert JAG World Champion (NBL sanctioned)
- 1985 14 Expert National No.3

American Bicycle Association (ABA)

- 1983 California District 9 (CAL-9) No.1
- 1985 14 Expert Grandnational Champion
- 1985 14 Expert Winter season* California 22 (CA-22) District age group (DAG) champion.
- 1985 14 Expert National No.1 (NAG)
- 1985 National No.3
- Retired for eight years
- 1995 21–25 Cruiser World Champion
- 1995 19 & Over Expert and 21–25 Cruiser Grandnational Champion
- 1995 National No.1

*In 1985 the ABA experimented with dividing the district points season from one year lasting from January 1 to December 31 to three four-month-long time periods at which a racer could earn a plate number for that time period and/or their age group and could race the rest of the year with it. The experiment lasted only for a year before the ABA reverted to a single year long points gathering season in 1986.

United States Bicycle Motocross Association (USBA)

- 1984 13 Expert 7-Up World Championships Champion**

**The 7-Up World Championship race was the direct descendant of the Jag BMX World Championship races held from 1978 to 1983. Renny Roker, the promoter of the JAG BMX World Championship gave the rights to the WC to the USBA in 1984 in return for the cable television rights.

International Bicycle Motocross Federation (IBMXF)*

- 1984 13 Expert and 13 & Under Cruiser World Champion
- 1985 14 Boys Bronze Medal World Champion

United States Cycling Federation (USCF)

- 1981 JAG 10 Expert World Champion

Independent Events, Race Series and Invitationals

- 1983 12 Expert Second Place Jag BMX World Superbowl Championship Champion
- 1984 13 Expert Larry Wilcox/Pepsi West Coast BMX Challenge Series Champion.

*See note in professional section

==== Professional ====
American Bicycle Association (ABA)

- 1996 National No.1 Pro. Prize won: A customized Jeep.
- 1996 "AA" Pro World Cup Champion

*Note: Beginning in 1991 the IBMXF and FIAC had been holding joint World Championship events as a transitional phase in merging which began in earnest in 1993. Beginning with the 1996 season the IBMXF and FIAC completed the merger and both ceased to exist as independent entities being integrated into the UCI. Beginning with the 1997 World Championships held in Brighton, England the UCI would officially hold and sanction BMX World Championships and with it inherited all precedents, records, streaks, etc. from both the IBMXF and FIAC.

Pro Series Championships

=== Notable accolades ===
- Named 5th of the Top 90 BMXers of the 90's

=== BMX product lines ===
- 1997 Mongoose "MacFearsome" Signature Series race bicycle.

Product evaluation

BMX Plus! February 1998 Vol.21 No.2 pg. 71 Note: this bicycle was jointly evaluated with the GT Speed Series Team bicycle.

- 2001 Diamondback Robert MacPherson RM20 frame

Product evaluation

Snap BMX Magazine December 2000 Vol. 7 Iss. 12 No. 50 pg. 118

=== Significant injuries ===
- Injured knee at the 1995 NBL Christmas Classic in Columbus, Ohio, on December 28, 1995.
- Damaged a rotator cuff in his shoulder at the ABA Lone Star Nationals in Humble, Texas, on March 23, 1997 (Day 2) in the first main. He managed to race the next two mains and finish third over all. He eventually went into surgery.

== Post BMX career ==
- After his retirement in 2002 he went back to school earn a degree in physical education. He was hired as an instructor at Val Verde USD in 2004. When he mentioned that he was formerly a professional BMX racer, they asked him to set up an alternative BMX-related PE course. He is currently teaching that subject to troubled kids.

== BMX press magazine interviews and articles ==
- "Robert McPherson" Snap BMX Magazine March/April 1997 Vol.4 Iss.2 No.15 pg.100
- "At Home with Robert MacPherson" BMX Plus! May 1997, Vol.20 No.5 pg.88
- "Robert McPherson" Snap BMX Magazine August 1999 Vol.6 Iss.6 No.34 back of poster in centerfold

== BMX magazine covers ==
Note: Only magazines that were in publication at the time of the racer's career(s) are listed unless specifically noted.

BMX Plus!:

- February 1998 Vol.21 No.2 with Billy Griggs and T.J. Lavin in insert.

ABA Action, American BMXer, BMXer (the official membership publication of the ABA under three different names):

- American BMXer April 1986 Vol.8 No.3 (3) behind in the background Matt Hadan (1).
