= Kiyomi Waller =

American bicycle motocross rider (born 1967)

Personal information
- Full name: Kiyomi Waller
- Nicknames: "Yo-Yo", "The Coyote"
- Born: December 21, 1967 (age 58) Oceanside, California, U.S.
- Height: 1.78 m (5 ft 10 in)
- Weight: ~80.7 kg (178 lb)

Cycling career
- Sport: Cycling
- Current team: Avent/Bombshell
- Discipline: Bicycle Motocross (BMX)
- Role: Racer
- Rider type: Off Road

Amateur teams
- 1979-1984: Torker (support)
- 1988-?: Redline (Factory)
- ?: Haro Designs (Factory)
- ?: PeddlePower
- ?-1991: Hustler

Professional teams
- 1992-1993: Haro/Capri
- 1994-1996: Parkpre Bicycles
- 1996-1997: Trek
- 1997–1998: Haro Bicycles
- six year hiatus: Retired from racing
- 2005–2006: GT Bicycles
- 2006–: Avent/Bombshell

Major wins
- ABA Northwest Nationals, Sumner, Wa 1998. 1st place AA Pro (Day 1) 2nd place AA Pro (Day 2)

Kiyomi Waller (born December 21, 1967) is an American professional "Old/Mid School" Bicycle Motocross (BMX) racer whose prime competitive years were from 1989-1998.

His most popular nickname was "Yo-Yo" which was derived from the third and fourth letters of his first name: Ki-YO-mi. This nickname was given by Old School racer 'Shawn Texas'. His second moniker was "The Coyote", possibly a rhyming play on his last name "Waller".

== Racing career milestones ==
Note: Professional firsts are on the National level unless otherwise indicated. Included under the term of "National" are American Bicycle Association (ABA) Gold Cup Qualifiers.

Milestone	Event Details
Started racing:	1979 at age 11 thru 1984. Retired for four years after the 1984 season and returned for the 1988 race year.
Sanctioning body:	
First race bike:	Diamond Back
First race result:	2nd Place, no ribbon or trophy
First win (local):	Lakeside, Ca 1979 11beginner
Home sanctioning body district(s):	NBMXA National Bicycle Association (NBA) San Diego District "S" (1979–1981); American Bicycle Association (ABA) California 2 (CA-2) (1980–1991)
First sponsor:	Hidden Valley bike shop, Escondido, Ca
First national win:	12 Novice ABA 'Indoor' National Anaheim, California; Possibly in 12 Novice at the ABA Gnarler Nationals in Anaheim, California in September 1980.
Turned Professional:	January 1992 at age 24.
First Professional race result:	Pre-Race 'Friday night' ABA Winter nationals 1992 Eighth place (last) in "A" pro at the American Bicycle Association (ABA) Winternationals in Phoenix, Arizona on February 15, 1992. He won US$50, the equivalent to US$76.12 in 2008 (Cost of Living Calculator). He also took second place in Pro Cruiser that day (Saturday, Day 1).
First Professional win:	"A" Pro at the ABA Summer Nationals in Sunol, California; In "A" Pro at the ABA Summer Nationals in Sunol, California on May 23, 1992.
First Junior Men/Pro* race result:	See "First professional race result"
First Junior Men/Pro win:	See "First professional win"
First Senior Pro** race result:	8th place NBL National Las Vegas, Nevada
First Senior Pro win:	
Height and weight at height of his career:	Ht:5'10" Wt:~178 lbs. (1988-1998)
Retired:	July 1999. After some forays into mountain biking and downhill BMX, he returned to racing in 2005. He currently races in the ABA/NBL Veteran Pro class.

*In the NBL "B" Pro/Super Class/"A" Pro depending on the era; in the ABA it is "A" Pro.
**In the NBL it is "A" Pro/Elite Men; in the ABA it is "AA" Pro.

=== Career factory and major bike shop sponsors ===
Note: This listing only denotes the racer's primary sponsors. At any given time a racer could have numerous ever changing co-sponsors. Primary sponsorships can be verified by BMX Press coverage and sponsor's advertisements at the time in question. When possible exact dates are given.

==== Amateur ====
- Torker: (Co sponsorship) 1980-1982
- Returned to racing after a four-year hiatus (1985 – January 1988)
- Hidden Valley Bike Shop: Late 1988-?
- PeddlePower: Mid May 1989 – Mid January 1990 Was unsponsored for five months until May 1989.
- Hustler/Crupi Parts: Mid January 1990 – late March 1990
- Redline Bicycles: Late March 1990 – April 22, 1990.
- Haro Designs: April 23, 1990 – December 1991.

==== Professional ====
- Haro/Crupi: January 1992 – 1993
- Parkpre Bicycles: 1994 – July 1996. At this time he was also Parkpre's bike designer and engineer.
- Trek: July 1996 – October 1997.
- Haro Bicycles: October 1997 – early 1999. After Haro dropped him and a few months of paying his own way to races Kiyomi retires for the second time in his career.
- Retired for six years (July 1999 – 2005).
- GT (Gary Turner) Bicycles: Mid 2005 – early 2006. Waller returns to racing competing in the Veteran's Pro and Master's Classes of the ABA and NBL respectively.
- Avent/Bombshell: March 28, 2006 – present

=== Career bicycle motocross titles ===
Note: Listed are District, State/Provincial/Department, Regional, National, and International titles in italics. "Defunct" refers to the fact of that sanctioning body in question no longer existing at the start of the racer's career or at that stage of his/her career. Depending on point totals of individual racers, winners of Grand Nationals do not necessarily win National titles. Series and one off Championships are also listed in block.

==== Amateur ====
National Bicycle Association (NBA)

- None

National Bicycle League (NBL)

- 18 & Over Expert and 21-27 Cruiser Grand National Champion

American Bicycle Association (ABA)

- 1989 17 & Over Boys Southern California State Champion
- 1989 17 & Over Expert National No.3
- 1990 21-25 Cruiser Gold Cup West Champion
- 1990 17 & Over Expert Race of Champions (ROC) Champion
- 1990 21-25 Cruiser Grand National Champion.
- 1990 21-25 Cruiser No.l (NAG)*
- 1990 National Cruiser No.3
- 1991 21-25 Cruiser Grand National Champion.
- 1991 National Amateur No.8
- 1991 National Cruiser No.3

*National Age Group

International Bicycle Motocross Federation (IBMXF)

- None

Union Cycliste Internationale (UCI)

==== Professional ====
National Bicycle Association (NBA)

- None

National Bicycle League (NBL)

- 1997, 1998 Pro Cruiser Grand National Champion.
- 1997 Pro Cruiser National No.1
- 2005 Elite Masters National No.3
- 2006 Masters Elite National No.1

American Bicycle Association (ABA)

- 1995 & 1997, 1998 Pro Cruiser National No.1

United States Bicycle Motocross Association (USBA)

- None

International Bicycle Motocross Federation (IBMXF)

- None

Union Cycliste Internationale (UCI)

Pro Series Championships

==== Amateur ====
- 2006 NBL 30 & Over Open Wheels Grand National Champion

=== Notable accolades ===
- Named one of the ten hottest and fastest rookie pros of 1992 by BMX Plus! magazine.

=== Significant injuries ===
- He had an injured shoulder during the weekend of August 19, 1990 and sat out the ABA Great Northwest Nationals in Seattle, Washington.

== BMX press magazine interviews and articles ==
- "Bio: Kiyomi Waller" Go October 1990 Vol.1 Iss.12 pg.50
- "Young Guns II"BMX Plus! June 1992 Vol.17 No.6 pg.27 One of ten rookie pro racers given a short listing profile article.

== BMX magazine covers ==
Bicycle Motocross News:

- None

Minicycle/BMX Action & Super BMX:

- None

Bicycle Motocross Action & Go:

- None

BMX Plus!:

- March 1992 Vol.15 No.3
- February 1997 Vol.20 No.2 (403) in bottom right insert. In middle insert Randy Stumpfhauser (200) leading race of pros including Brian Foster (3) on the inside in second; Charles Townsend (10) in fourth; unidentified (16) in third. In top right insert dirt jumper Matt Beringer. In bottom left insert various helmets.
- September 1997 Vol.20 No.9 (18) in bottom insert racing Mike Hajek (25) Top image Redline racing frame. Main image: Dave Voelker
- June 1998 Vol.21 No.6 (18) with Danny Nelson (6).

Total BMX:

- None

Bicycles and Dirt:

- None

Snap BMX Magazine & Transworld BMX:

- None

NBA World & NBmxA World (The official NBA/NBmxA membership publication):

Bicycles Today & BMX Today (The official NBL membership publication through one name change):

ABA Action, American BMXer, BMXer (the official ABA publication through two name changes):

- American BMXer March 1990 Vol.12 No.2 in the center panel with Todd Corbitt ay left and Eric Abbadessa at right inseparate panels.

USBA Racer (The official USBA membership publication):
