= Wade Bootes =

Australian bicycle motocross rider

Wade Bootes (born 30 May 1974 in Toowoomba, Queensland) is an Australian professional "Mid/Current School" Bicycle Motocross (BMX) and Mountain Bike (MTB) racer whose prime competitive years are from 1995 to 2003 in BMX and 1999 to 2004 in MTB. He usually goes by the moniker "Bootsie" or "Bootsey". During his mountain bike career he also picked up the nickname "Thunder from Down Under". He was voted 2003 Australian Cyclist of the Year in BMX. While competing in the snow mountain bike event at the January 1999 ESPN Winter X Games in Colorado he suffered an attack of high altitude pulmonary edema, a potentially fatal condition. He was told by a physician to rest for two weeks. He suffered a minor separated shoulder during the dual slalom event of the first round of the World Cup in Maribor, Slovenia in early June 2001. He broke his right collar bone at the 2006 MTB World Championships in Rotorua, New Zealand during qualifying rounds on 23 August 2006. he stayed overnight at a Rotorua hospital.
