= Christophe Lévêque =

French BMX racer

Personal information
- Full name: Christophe Lévêque
- Born: 11 February 1973 (age 53) Saint-Ouen, Seine-Saint-Denis, France
- Height: 1.78 m (5 ft 10 in)
- Weight: 86.8 kg (191 lb)

Cycling career
- Sport: Cycling
- Current team: Retired
- Discipline: Bicycle motocross (BMX)
- Role: Racer
- Rider type: Off Road

Amateur teams
- 1990: MCS Bicycle Specialties (Europe)
- 1990–1996: Sunn/Chipie

Professional teams
- 1990–1996: Sunn/Chipie
- 1996–2000: Sunn/Nike
- 1998–2000: Specialized
- 2000–2001: Specialized/Mountain Dew
- 2002–2005: GT Bicycles/Speed Stick
- 2006: US Pro Bikes/Free Agent

Christophe Lévêque (born 11 February 1973) is a former-professional French "Mid/Current School" BMX racer.

== Racing career ==
Christophe Lévêque began BMX (bicycle motocross) racing in 1987, at age 14, and achieved first place in his first novice race. As an amateur, he was sponsored by the European division of Moto Cross Specialties.

He turned professional in December 1990 and achieved his first professional win in the United States the following year at the American Bicycle Association (ABA) Fallnationals. Two months later, his first race on the senior professional circuit was a last-place finish at the National Bicycle League (NBL) Christmas Classic nationals.

In 1992, Lévêque achieved his first senior pro win at the non-sanctioned charity Fifth Annual Race Against Drugs, in Palm Springs, California. His competition had included Eric Carter, Jamie Staff, Todd Corbitt and Todd Blaser in the main.

In January 1995, he broke his wrist while riding recreationally and required surgery in France. He returned to racing at the ABA Winternationals on March 18.

There was a controversy regarding the 1995 ABA National No. 1 Pro championship. Lévêque had earned the most points but the title went to points runner-up Gary Ellis due to an obscure rule that only permitted an American citizen to win the title. The rule was revoked from the ABA rule book after the 1995 season ended. With the rule change, Lévêque subsequently won the title in 1998 and 1999.

He injured his shoulder at the NBL Summer Nationals in July 1996, which kept him from racing through the following year. Another injury at the ABA Fall Nationals in October 1998 laid him up for five months. During the ABA Grandnational in November 1999, he separated his shoulder in a crash.

At the NBL Easter Classic National in March 2002, Lévêque hurt his back and returned to France for several surgeries to repair and eventually replace a ruptured disc, putting him out of racing for the season. In early October 2003, Lévêque broke his foot in a race in France.

While laid up from injuries in 2003, Lévêque started a BMX distribution company, US Pro Bikes.

In March 2004, Lévêque shattered his heel and was laid up for eight months, due in part to complications from the healing process. It did not respond to therapy, and Lévêque retired in mid-2005 due to accumulated injuries. His last professional race was a fourth-place finish in the ABA Silver Dollar National in Reno, Nevada, on 9 January 2005.

Lévêque held a dozen French championships, a dozen International Bicycle Motocross Federation (IBMXF) championships, five Union Cycliste Internationale (UCI) championships, and the 2001 ABA Golden Crank award for Pro of the Year.
