= Bubba (disambiguation) =

Bubba is a term of endearment in the Southern United States. It is used as a male name or nickname.

Bubba may also refer to:

- Bubba (album), a 2019 studio album by Kaytranada
- Joseph Bubba (born 1938), American politician
- Bubba Foods, an American frozen food brand
