= Zulu Djævleræs =

Danish TV program

- Genre: Reality television
- Created by: Thomas Breinholt
- Presented by: Lisbeth Østergaard (season 1); Julie Ølgaard (season 2)
- Starring: Tage "Bowler" Hansen
- Narrated by: Jimmy Bøjgaard; Tage "Bowler" Hansen
- Country of origin: Denmark
- Original language: Danish
- No. of seasons: 2
- No. of episodes: 7

Production
- Producer: Rasmus Steentoft
- Production location: Nysumbanen
- Running time: 45 min.

Original release
- Network: TV 2 Zulu
- Release: 13 April – 25 May 2007

Zulu Djævleræs (Danish: Zulu Devil Race) is a Danish reality television programme currently hosted by Julie Ølgaard.

Every episode consists of 3 heats. The first two heats consist of all men and all women driving against each other. In the third heat, "Djævleheatet" (English: The Devil Heat), the couples themselves choose who is to drive. This heat includes obstacles, which change from episode to episode. In the third heat, the drivers fight for double points.

== Season 1 ==
40 famous Danes competed in "folkeræs" (English: people's race) in pairs, one man and one woman.

The first four episodes were preliminary rounds. Five couples competed here for three spots in the semi-finals. The heat-winner got 3 points, the runner-up got 2 points, and no. 3, 1 point. Half of the 12 couples in the semi-final qualified for the final. In the final stage, the heat-winner won 4 points, second place 3 points, and so on down to no. 4, who got 1 point.

=== Results ===
==== Preliminary rounds ====
===== Episode 1 =====
| | Heat 1 | Heat 2 | Heat 3 | Total |
|---|---|---|---|---|
| Mariah Rudi & Michael Bjørnson | 2 | 3 | 4 | 9 |
| Anja Stensig & Henrik Skovgaard | | 1 | 6 | 7 |
| Søs Freddie Petersen & Sonny Freddie Petersen | 3 | | 2 | 5 |
| Stephanie Leon & Noam Halby | 1 | 2 | | 3 |
| Julie Ruggaard & Thomas Madvig | | | | 0 |

===== Episode 2 =====
| | Heat 1 | Heat 2 | Heat 3 | Total |
|---|---|---|---|---|
| Liv Corfixen & Pelle Hvenegaard | | 3 | 6 | 9 |
| Victoria Franova & Mads Christensen | 1 | | 4 | 5 |
| Soffie Dalsgaard & Dan Rachlin | 2 | 1 | 2 | 5 |
| Rikke Hørlykke & Claus Elming | 3 | | | 3 |
| Mascha Vang & Simon Mathew | | 2 | | 2 |

===== Episode 3 =====
| | Heat 1 | Heat 2 | Heat 3 | Total |
|---|---|---|---|---|
| Lotte Thor & Anders Fjeldsted | 1 | | 6 | 7 |
| Helle Ankerstjerne & Bubber | 2 | 3 | 2 | 7 |
| Emilie Brandt & Karl Bille | | 2 | 4 | 6 |
| Jim Lyngvild & Carl Mar Møller | 3 | | | 3 |
| Claire Ross-Brown & Alex | | 1 | | 1 |

===== Episode 4 =====
| | Heat 1 | Heat 2 | Heat 3 | Total |
|---|---|---|---|---|
| Julie Ølgaard & Uffe Holm | | 3 | 6 | 9 |
| Anita Christensen & Jens Romuldstad | 3 | 2 | 2 | 7 |
| Audrey Castañeda & Robert Hansen | 1 | | 4 | 5 |
| Malene Hasselblad & Allan Nielsen | 2 | 1 | | 3 |
| Mira Wanting & Niarn | | | | 0 |

==== Semi-finals ====
===== Episode 5 =====
| | Heat 1 | Heat 2 | Heat 3 | Total |
|---|---|---|---|---|
| Anja Stensig & Henrik Skovgaard | 1 | 4 | 8 | 13 |
| Anita Christensen & Jens Romuldstad | 4 | 2 | 4 | 10 |
| Mariah Rudi & Michael Bjørnson | 3 | | 6 | 9 |
| Liv Corfixen & Pelle Hvenegaard | 2 | | 2 | 4 |
| Julie Ølgaard & Uffe Holm | | 3 | | 3 |
| Emilie Brandt & Karl Bille | | 1 | | 1 |

===== Episode 6 =====
| | Heat 1 | Heat 2 | Heat 3 | Total |
|---|---|---|---|---|
| Audrey Castañeda & Robert Hansen | 2 | | 8 | 10 |
| Soffie Dalsgaard & Dan Rachlin | | 4 | 6 | 10 |
| Helle Ankerstjerne & Bubber | 3 | 3 | 2 | 8 |
| Victoria Franova & Mads Christensen | 2 | 2 | | 4 |
| Lotte Thor & Anders Fjeldsted | | | 2 | 2 |
| Søs Freddie Petersen & Sonny Freddie Petersen | 1 | 1 | | 2 |

==== Final ====
| | Heat 1 | Heat 2 | Heat 3 | Total |
|---|---|---|---|---|
| Anja Stensig & Henrik Skovgaard | | 2 | 8 | 10 |
| Mariah Rudi & Michael Bjørnson | 2 | 1 | 6 | 9 |
| Soffie Dalsgaard & Dan Rachlin | | 3 | 4 | 7 |
| Anita Christensen & Jens Romuldstad | 3 | 4 | | 7 |
| Helle Ankerstjerne & Bubber | 4 | | | 4 |
| Audrey Castañeda & Robert Hansen | 1 | | 2 | 3 |
