= 2017 BUBBA Burger Sports Car Grand Prix =

The layout of the Long Beach Street Circuit

The 2017 BUBBA Burger Sports Car Grand Prix was an International Motor Sports Association (IMSA)-sanctioned sports car race held on the Long Beach Street Circuit in California, United States, on April 8, 2017 as part of the Long Beach Grand Prix event weekend. The race was the third of twelve scheduled rounds of the 2017 WeatherTech SportsCar Championship, and was held for the Prototype, Grand Touring Le Mans (GTLM) and Grand Touring Daytona (GTD) categories. The race was the shortest of the 2017 WeatherTech Championship calendar.

Jordan Taylor and Ricky Taylor won an incident packed race in their No. 10 Wayne Taylor Racing Cadillac DPi-V.R to take their third win in the opening three races of the championship. The Nissan Onroak DPi of Scott Sharp and Ryan Dalziel and the Mazda RT24-P of Tristan Nunez and Jonathan Bomarito completing the podium. Corvette Racing's Oliver Gavin and Tommy Milner won in the GTLM class driving a Chevrolet Corvette C7.R while the Riley Motorsports – WeatherTech Racing Mercedes-AMG GT3 of Cooper MacNeil and Gunnar Jeannette won in the GTD category.

Three GTD cars who crashed into the wall on the outside of the turn eleven hairpin on the last lap caused chaos for a number of vehicles as it partially blocked the track. The biggest loser was the No. 3 Chevrolet Corvette of Jan Magnussen and Antonio García. They had been leading the GTLM class but their path through the hairpin was blocked and they dropped from sixth outright and first in class to tenth outright and fifth in class, handing the class win to their teammates. Although the passing had happened under yellow flag conditions, IMSA officials took the view, as they had done earlier in the race when a crash at the hairpin partially blocked the track, that the passing was done to avoid completely blocking the track and no penalties were handed out.

== Background ==
=== Entry list ===
Thirty-five cars were officially entered for the BUBBA Burger Sports Car Grand Prix, with the bulk of entries in the two Grand Touring (GT) categories: Grand Touring Le Mans (GTLM) and Grand Touring Daytona (GTD). Since the majority of the remaining rounds of the 2017 WeatherTech SportsCar Championship were sprint races, teams entered their regular driver pairings for the first time this season. Because of the lack of space provided by the Long Beach paddock, International Motor Sports Association (IMSA) only accepted "premium" entrants (teams participating in the whole championship) for this year's race. Seven Daytona Prototype International (DPi) chassis were represented in the Prototype class, including a trio of Cadillac DPi-V.R cars and a duo of Nissan Onroak DPi and Mazda RT24-P vehicles. They were joined by three global-specification Le Mans Prototype 2 (LMP2) cars, represented by three out of the four major chassis: one Oreca 07 entered by JDC-Miller MotorSports, a Ligier JS P217 utilised by PR1/Mathiasen Motorsports and one Riley Mk. 30 operated by VisitFlorida Racing.

With the absence of the Prototype Challenge class from the field, only three racing classes were represented in Long Beach. GTLM was represented by nine entries from manufacturers such as Corvette Racing, Ford Chip Ganassi Racing USA, Porsche, Ferrari (Risi Competizione) and BMW with no major changes in that field. In the list of GTD entrants, sixteen GT3-specification vehicles were represented by eight different manufacturers. The No. 991 The Racer's Group Porsche 911 GT3 R was reinstated to the WeatherTech SportsCar Championship after it was withdrawn following a number of flat tires with the car at the season-opening 24 Hours of Daytona. Although it was listed as an entrant, Dream Racing's No. 27 Lamborghini Huracán did not participate despite their headquarters being within a close proximity to Long Beach. Alegra Motorsports had originally planned to focus solely on the 2017 North American Endurance Cup but the team entered its No. 28 Porsche 991 GT3 R for the Long Beach round.

=== Preview ===
IMSA's president Scott Atherton confirmed the BUBBA Burger Sports Car Grand Prix was part of the series' schedule for the 2017 WeatherTech SportsCar Championship at Road America's victory lane in August 2016. It was the fourth consecutive year the event was held as part of the WeatherTech SportsCar Championship, and the tenth annual running of the race, counting the period between 2006 and 2013 when it was a round of the Rolex Sports Car Series and the American Le Mans Series respectively. The 2017 BUBBA Burger Sports Car Grand Prix was the third of twelve scheduled sports car races of 2018 by IMSA, the shortest of the season in terms of distance, and it was the first round not held as part of the North American Endurance Cup. The race was held at the eleven-turn 1.968 mi (3.167 km) Long Beach street circuit on April 8.

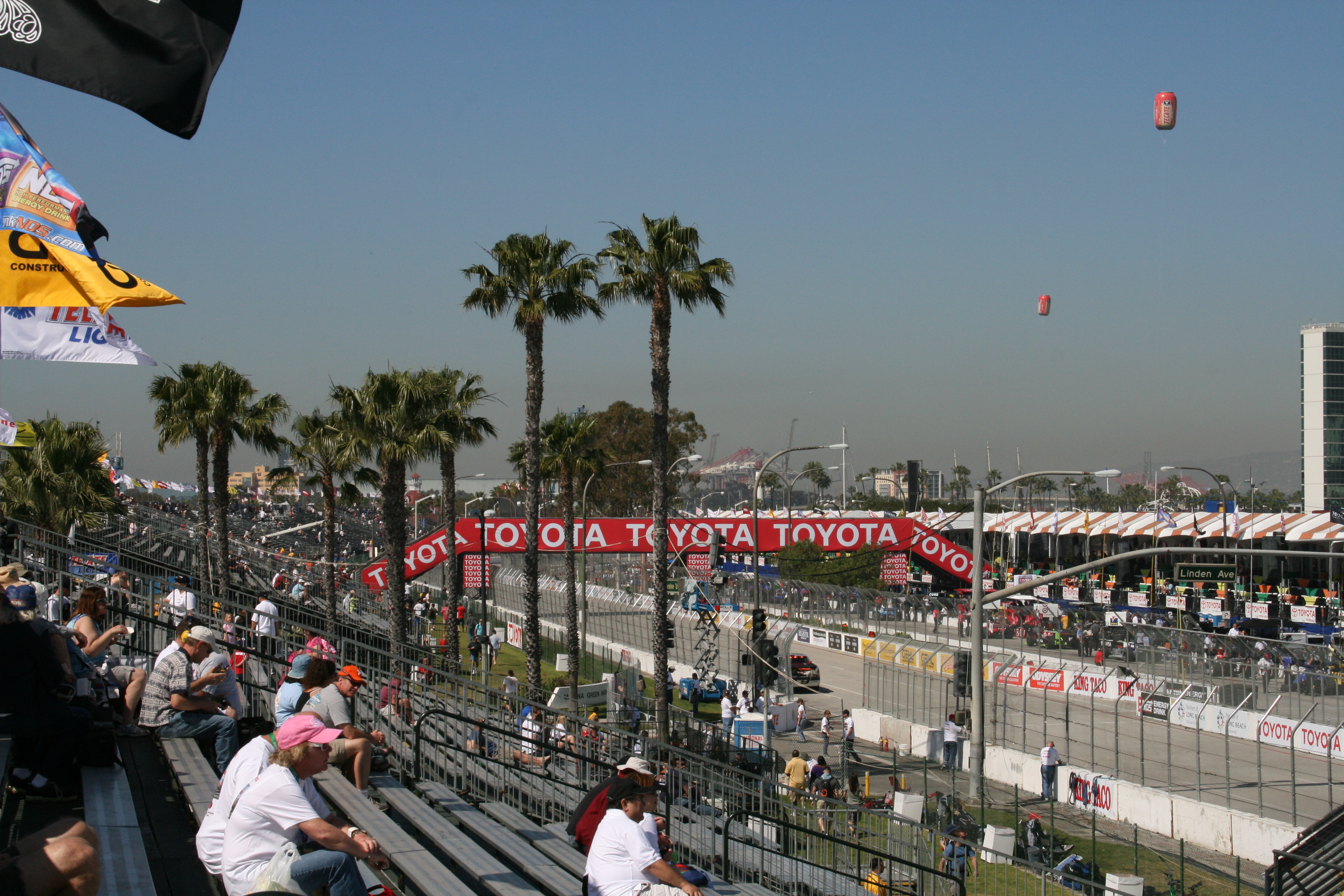
The Long Beach Street Circuit (pictured in 2009), where the race was held.

After the 12 Hours of Sebring three weeks earlier, Jordan Taylor and Ricky Taylor led the Prototype Drivers' Championship with 70 points, ahead of Filipe Albuquerque, João Barbosa and Christian Fittipaldi with 65 points, and Dane Cameron, Mike Conway, and Eric Curran in third with 56 points. With 67 points, GTLM was led by Sébastien Bourdais, Joey Hand, and Dirk Müller with a four-point advantage over Antonio García, Jan Magnussen and Mike Rockenfeller. In GTD, the Drivers' Championship was led by Jeroen Bleekemolen, Mario Farnbacher and Ben Keating with 66 points; the trio held a six-point gap over Jules Gounon, Christopher Mies, and Connor De Phillippi. Cadillac, Ford, and Mercedes-AMG were leading their respective Manufacturers' Championships, while Wayne Taylor Racing, Ford Chip Ganassi Racing, and Riley Motorsports each led their own Teams' Championships.

IMSA altered the balance of performance to try to create parity within each category for the third time in the season. All of the Cadillac DPi-V.Rs had their fuel tanks reduced by 2 L (0.44 imp gal; 0.53 US gal), and the size of their fuel hose restrictors were reduced by 0.5 mm (0.020 in) to increase the amount of its refuelling time. The Mazda RT-24Ps and the Nissan Onroak DPis had their turbocharger pressures raised for an increase in performance. The Riley/Multimatic MK30's refuelling hose restrictor was shortened by 2 mm (0.079 in). The Porsche 911 RSR had its weight increased by 10 kg (22 lb), but lost performance with a 0.3 mm (0.012 in) reduction to its air restrictors, a 2 L (0.44 imp gal; 0.53 US gal) decrease of fuel capacity, and a 5 mm (0.20 in) shortening of their refuelling hose restrictor.

Ferrari's 488 GTE received a fuel cell increase by 1 L (0.22 imp gal; 0.26 US gal), a boost pressure raise from all revolution per minute ranges, and had 0.5 mm (0.020 in) added to its refuelling hose restrictor to shorten its refuelling time. The BMW M6 GTLM also received a boost pressure increase while it had a fuel cell raised by 1 L (0.22 imp gal; 0.26 US gal). The Acura NSX was given a higher top-end boost range to its twin-turbocharged engine; the two Lexus RC Fs had a horsepower reduction with the loss of 1 mm (0.039 in) to the air restrictor on the air intake of their engines. The Mercedes-AMG GT3 was given a weight increase of 10 kg (22 lb), while the Porsche 991 GT3 R had its weight lowered by 20 kg (44 lb).

== Practice and qualifying ==
A two-hour practice session was held on the Friday morning before the race. Jordan Taylor led overall in the No. 10 Wayne Taylor Racing Cadillac DPi-V.R with a lap of 1 minute and 14.982 seconds on his final attempt of the session. The No. 2 Extreme Speed Motorsports Nissan Onroak DPi of Ryan Dalziel was second-fastest. Fittipaldi was third in the No. 5 Mustang Sampling Racing vehicle, Jonathan Bomarito's No. 55 Mazda RT-24P placed fourth, with Cameron's No. 31 Whelen Engineering Racing car in the fifth position. The GTLM class was topped by the No. 911 Porsche 911 RSR of Patrick Pilet with a time of 1 minute and 16.670 seconds. His teammate Kévin Estre in the sister No. 912 car was second and Magnussen's No. 3 Chevrolet Corvette C7.R placed third. Paul Miller Racing's No. 48 Lamborghini Huracán of Bryan Sellers, whose lap was 0.063 seconds faster than Bleekemolen's No. 33 Riley Motorsports Mercedes-AMG. Michael Christensen in the No. 28 Alegra Motorsports Porsche 991 R rounded out the category's top three.

The session was red flagged three times for on-track accidents. 41 minutes into the session, the brakes on the No. 90 VisitFlorida Racing Mk. 30 of Renger van der Zande failed, and he spun into the tire wall before going to hit the concrete barrier alongside the circuit at the turn one run-off area. The car sustained heavy damage to its right-front and left-hand quarter panels, but van der Zande was uninjured and exited his car without external aid. William Owen locked the No. 52 PR1/Mathiasen Motorsports Ligier JS P2's brakes and had a similar accident to van der Zande at the first corner 23 minutes later. Owen got the car back to the pit lane and the session was stopped for six minutes while debris was cleared from the circuit. The final stoppage came when Scott Pruett crashed the No. 14 3GT Racing Lexus RC F into the outside wall leaving the fifth corner with its left-hand quarter. Pruett was uninjured, but the car was extricated to the pit lane by course officials for repairs, and four minutes of the practice session were left to run. After practice, Visit Florida Racing withdrew the No. 90 car because the left-front portion of its tub was damaged beyond repair, and the team did not transport a spare chassis to Long Beach.

Ricky Taylor's No. 10 car led the second 25-minute practice session, followed by Bomarito's No. 55 Mazda by six-tenths of a second. Fittipaldi placed third after spinning in the session's closing minutes. The No. 4 Chevrolet Corvette C7.R of Oliver Gavin was fastest in GTLM and GTD was topped by Sellers's No. 48 Lamborghini Huracán. Andy Lally's No. 86 Michael Shank Racing Acura NSX was heavily damaged at its right-front after hitting the wall, and Pilet picked up right-rear suspension damage to the No. 911 Porsche when he glanced the barrier at turn nine. Thursday afternoon's qualifying session was divided into three groups and lasted for a total of 90 minutes. GTD cars were sent onto the track first for fifteen minutes with a ten-minute interval before those grouped in GTLM and Prototype had two separate identically timed sessions. Regulations stipulate that teams are required to nominate a single driver to qualify their cars. The competitors' fastest lap times determined the starting order. IMSA then arranged the grid so that the Prototype started in front of all GTLM cars, who in turn, began ahead of the GTD field.

Ricky Taylor in the No. 10 Cadillac bettered his own lap record of the Long Beach Street Circuit from the 2014 event to clinch his first pole position of the season, his second at Long Beach, and the 14th of his career with a time of 1 minute and 13.549 seconds. He was joined on the grid's front row by Fittipaldi whose best lap in the No. 5 Mustang Sampling Racing car was 0.204 seconds slower, and he improved his best lap during the later stages of the qualifying session. Tristan Nunez qualified the No. 55 Mazda RT-24P in the third position. Mikhail Goikhberg's No. 85 JDC-Miller MotorSports Oreca 07 was the highest-placed of all the LMP2 entrants in fourth with a lap time he set in the session's closing seconds. The No. 31 Whelen Engineering Racing Cadillac of Curran started from fifth place. The duo of Extreme Speed Motorsports Nissan Onroak DPis were sixth and ninth: Scott Sharp in the No. 2 car was faster than the sister No. 22 entry of Ed Brown. They were separated by the seventh-placed Tom Long in the No. 70 Mazda RT-24P and Owen's No. PR1/Mathiasen Motorsports Ligier JS P2 was eighth.

In GTLM, Magnussen set a new category track record, and took his first pole position since the 2016 Oak Tree Grand Prix, and the 19th of his career with a lap of 1 minute and 16.909 seconds that he set on his tenth try. He was joined by Joey Hand's No. 66 Ford GT on the grid's front row with his best lap being 0.092 seconds slower, and Toni Vilander drove the No. 62 Risi Competizione Ferrari 488 to third place. Fourth-placed Laurens Vanthoor was the only Porsche to qualify after Pilet's No. 911 car was being repaired from his earlier crash in second practice. Bill Auberlen's No. 25 BMW M6 completed the top five category qualifiers. Vilander lost control of his car's rear, and spun into the tire barrier at the end of the back straight but continued without any apparent damage. Richard Westbrook ran wide coming out of turn eight, and he made contact with the tire wall leaving the corner, removing his rear wing and left-rear quarter panel. Debris was littered on the track, and the session was stopped with three minutes left to allow for its removal. On his tenth lap, Sellers took his second consecutive GTD pole position on a street circuit with a time of 1 minute and 19.243 seconds. Jack Hawksworth's No. 14 3GT Lexus qualified second, and Daniel Morad's No. 28 Alegra Motorsports took third. Rounding out the top five in the class were the No. 16 Change Racing Lamborghini of Corey Lewis, and Lawson Aschenbach's No. 57 Stevenson Motorsports Audi R8 LMS.

=== Qualifying results ===
Pole positions in each class are indicated in bold.

Pos.	Class	No.	Team	Driver	Time	Gap	Grid
1	**P**	**10**	**(United States) Wayne Taylor Racing**	**(United States) Ricky Taylor**	**1:13.549**	—	1
2	P	5	(United States) Mustang Sampling Racing	(Portugal) João Barbosa	1:13.753	+0.204	2
3	P	55	(Japan) Mazda Motorsports	(United States) Tristan Nunez	1:14.128	+0.579	3
4	P	85	(United States) JDC-Miller MotorSports	(Canada) Misha Goikhberg	1:14.408	+0.859	4
5	P	31	(United States) Whelen Engineering Racing	(United States) Eric Curran	1:14.444	+0.895	5
6	P	2	(United States) Tequila Patrón ESM	(United States) Scott Sharp	1:14.563	+1.014	6
7	P	70	(Japan) Mazda Motorsports	(United States) Tom Long	1:14.961	+1.412	7
8	P	52	(United States) PR1/Mathiasen Motorsports	(United States) Will Owen	1:16.521	+2.979	8
9	P	22	(United States) Tequila Patrón ESM	(United States) Ed Brown	1:16.682	+3.133	9
**10**	**GTLM**	**3**	**(United States) Corvette Racing**	**(Denmark) Jan Magnussen**	**1:16.909**	**+3.360**	10
11	GTLM	66	(United States) Ford Chip Ganassi Racing	(United States) Joey Hand	1:17.001	+3.452	11
12	GTLM	62	(United States) Risi Competizione	(Finland) Toni Vilander	1:17.043	+3.494	12
13	GTLM	912	(United States) Porsche GT Team	(Belgium) Laurens Vanthoor	1:17.056	+3.507	13
14	GTLM	25	(United States) BMW Team RLL	(United States) Bill Auberlen	1:17.072	+3.523	14
15	GTLM	4	(United States) Corvette Racing	(United Kingdom) Oliver Gavin	1:17.115	+3.566	15
16	GTLM	24	(United States) BMW Team RLL	(United States) John Edwards	1:17.290	+3.751	16
17	GTLM	67	(United States) Ford Chip Ganassi Racing	(United Kingdom) Richard Westbrook	1:17.487	+3.938	17
**18**	**GTD**	**48**	**(United States) Paul Miller Racing**	**(United States) Bryan Sellers**	**1:19.243**	**+5.694**	19
19	GTD	15	(United States) 3GT Racing	(United Kingdom) Jack Hawksworth	1:19.276	+5.727	20
20	GTD	28	(United States) Alegra Motorsports	(Canada) Daniel Morad	1:19.375	+5.826	21
21	GTD	16	(United States) Change Racing	(United States) Corey Lewis	1:19.379	+5.830	22
22	GTD	57	(United States) Stevenson Motorsports	(United States) Lawson Aschenbach	1:19.752	+6.203	23
23	GTD	33	(United States) Riley Motorsports – Team AMG	(United States) Ben Keating	1:19.876	+6.327	24
24	GTD	991	(United States) TRG	(Belgium) Jan Heylen	1:19.885	+6.336	25
25	GTD	93	(United States) Michael Shank Racing with Curb-Agajanian	(United Kingdom) Katherine Legge	1:20.029	+5.580	26
26	GTD	73	(United States) Park Place Motorsports	(United States) Patrick Lindsey	1:20.149	+6.600	27
27	GTD	75	(Australia) SunEnergy1 Racing	(United States) Boris Said	1:20.173	+6.624	28
28	GTD	63	(United States) Scuderia Corsa	(Denmark) Christina Nielsen	1:20.203	+6.554	29
29	GTD	86	(United States) Michael Shank Racing with Curb-Agajanian	(Brazil) Oswaldo Negri Jr.	1:20.242	+6.693	30
30	GTD	50	(United States) Riley Motorsports – WeatherTech Racing	(United States) Cooper MacNeil	1:20.363	+6.814	31
31	GTD	96	(United States) Turner Motorsport	(United States) Bret Curtis	1:21.523	+7.974	32
32	GTD	54	(United States) CORE Autosport	(United States) Jon Bennett	1:22.837	+9.288	33
33	GTLM	911	(United States) Porsche GT Team	Did not participate			18^{1}
34	GTD	14	(United States) 3GT Racing	Did not participate			34^{1}
WD	P	90	(United States) VisitFlorida Racing	Withdrawn			—^{2}

Notes:

- **^1** – The No. 14 3GT Racing and No. 911 Porsche GT Team entries did not participate in qualifying after crashes in practice left them unable to participate.
- **^2** – The No. 90 VisitFlorida Racing car was withdrawn due to a heavy amount of damage to its tub in an accident during the first practice session.

== Race ==
Weather conditions at the start were dry and clear. The air temperature throughout the race was between 64.2 and 66.6 °F (17.9 and 19.2 °C) and the track temperature ranged from 65 to 68 °F (18 to 20 °C). The No. 911 Porsche 911 RSR of Pilet and Dirk Werner had many of the components attached to its sub-frame replaced overnight to allow for the car's participation in the event after the damage sustained to it in the second practice session. The green flag was waved by singer-songwriter and grand marshal Chester Bennington at 13:05 Pacific Standard Time (UTC−08:00) to signal the race's commencement. Ricky Taylor blocked Barbosa and Nunez to hold the lead on the approach to turn one. Nunez however got ahead of Fittipaldi on the inside line at the same corner for the second position. Exiting turn five, the right-rear quarter panel of Brown's No. 22 Nissan DPi was hit by Vilander's Ferrari, spinning him 180 degrees, and catching out Hand's No. 66 Ford which was close behind the pair. Magnussen made contact with the rear of Hand's car, and fell from the lead of GTLM to sixth in class. Long overtook Goikhberg for fifth overall going into turn one. A full course caution was displayed soon after, and Vilander's Ferrari and Brown's Nissan DPi retired because of the heavy amount damage to their cars.

Racing resumed with 78 minutes and 3 seconds left with Ricky Taylor maintaining his lead over Nunez by using the higher amount of torque in his car and Vanthoor leading the eight-car GTLM field. Goikhberg had been unsettled by the bumpy track surface, and he locked his brakes on the way to running straight into the turn nine run-off area. He reversed to rejoin the track, but he dropped to 32nd overall. A second full course yellow was called for on the eleventh lap when carbon fibre debris from Hand's No. 66 Ford was located by series officials on the racing line on the main straight. Some cars from all three categories made pit stops for tires and fuel during the caution. Hand was relieved by Müller, the only driver change during the caution. At the restart on lap 15, Ricky Taylor held off Nunez on the outside line to hold the lead on the run to turn one. Curran used the slower GTD traffic to narrow the distance to Long on the main straight for fourth overall. Not long after, Auberlen blocked Gavin from overtaking him through turns eight for second in GTLM. Auberlen was later delayed by the No. 57 Stevenson Audi R8 LMS at turn six, allowing Gavin to challenge him around the inside heading towards the next corner, but Gavin was unsuccessful.

Down the back stretch on the 21st lap, Gunnar Jeannette's slower No. 50 Riley Mercedes-AMG made contact with the rear of Fittipaldi's No. 5 Cadillac who had just lapped him, and Fittipaldi was sent spinning backwards and made a heavy impact with the turn nine tire barrier. Fittipaldi's Cadillac was heavily damaged at its rear, and he drove into the pit lane for a rear bodywork assembly replacement, as the third full course caution was activated to allow for on-track debris removal. As green flag racing resumed with just under an hour to go, some cars made their scheduled pit stops. In heavy GTD traffic, Werner's No. 911 Porsche attempted to steer left onto the inside line to pass Müller's No. 66 Ford on the main straight but Müller blocked the pass. Owen's No. 52 Ligier was under pressure from Dalziel's No. 22 Nissan DPi, and went wide into the turn one run-off area after braking later than usual for the corner. Curran overtook Long for fourth and the latter made contact with Estre's right-rear quarter panel on his No. 912 Porsche coming off the ninth corner. Paul Miller Racing's No. 48 Lamborghini of Madison Snow served a stop-and-go penalty for entering the pit lane for a scheduled stop while it was closed to racing traffic.

Porsche's No. 911 of Werner dived down the inside lane, and he ran into Müller's right-rear quarter panel at the turn eleven hairpin, sending him into a 360 degree pirouette, and removing the No. 66 Ford's rear wing after it slid backward into the outside barrier lining the track. Müller could not get the car facing in the correct direction due to the track's narrowness, and he created a temporary multi-car traffic jam, prompting the fourth full course caution. Under caution, the majority of the Prototypes made pit stops for tires and driver changes. Martin Tomczyk's No. 24 BMW M6 had earlier advanced to first in GTLM through an alternate strategy, and he took the overall lead on the 34th lap, which he held at the rolling restart from Antonio García's No. 3 Chevrolet Corvette C7.R and Ryan Briscoe's No. 67 Ford. At this point, Dalziel took the Prototype class lead after a short pit stop for fuel for the No. 22 Nissan DPi during the caution. On lap 40, Jordan Taylor's No. 10 car was overtaken by Cameron's No. 31 vehicle driving towards the entry for the first turn for second in the Prototype category and tenth overall. Cameron lost the place on the next lap when GTD traffic on the back straight impeded him and allowed Jordan Taylor to make the pass on the outside.

On lap 42, the final caution was given. Cameron made an unforced driving error, as he carried too much speed, and made contact with the inside wall at turn eight. The impact put Cameron heavily into the outside retaining wall leaving the corner. Cameron was injured but the No. 31 Whelen Engineering Car was retired because to the heavy amount of damage it sustained. Tomczyk led at the restart on lap 48. That lap, Dalziel moved to the overall lead by passing Tomczyk on the run to turn six. Tomczyk lost second to Jordan Taylor on the main straight at the beginning of the following lap. Taylor closed to within a second per lap of Dalziel but the latter responded by setting strong lap times to maintain the first position. Six minutes later, Tomczyk slowed with a suspected engine control unit failure exiting turn eight, handing the lead of GTLM to the No. 3 Chevrolet Corvette of Garcia. His teammate Tommy Milner in the sister No. 3 car got ahead of Briscoe's No. 67 vehicle for second on the run to the ninth corner. With six minutes remaining, Dalziel was delayed by slower GTD traffic, allowing Jordan Taylor to challenge him. Taylor took advantage of Dalziel being further bulked by GTD traffic on the approach to turn one to pass him around the outside for the lead.

An initial attack from Dalziel to retake the first position was repelled by Jordan Taylor, who kept the lead to claim his and Ricky Taylor's third win in a row, and their third overall Long Beach victory. Dalziel followed 6.349 seconds later in second to take his and Sharp's best finish of the season at the time, and the overall podium was completed by Bomarito and Nunez's No. 55 Mazda RT-24P in third. Three GTD cars crashed into the turn eleven hairpin outside wall on the last lap and created chaos for a number of vehicles as it partially blocked the track. The biggest loser was the No. 3 Chevrolet Corvette of Jan Magnussen and Antonio García whose path through the hairpin was blocked and they fell from sixth outright and first in class to tenth outright and fifth in class, handing the class win to Milner and Gavin. Although the passing had happened under yellow flag conditions, IMSA officials took the view, as they had done earlier in the race when a crash at the hairpin partially blocked the track, that the passing was done to avoid completely blocking the track and no penalties were handed out. GTD was won by the No. 50 Riley Technologies Mercedes-AMG of Cooper MacNeil and Jeanette after a strategy to make an early pit stop for fuel allowed him to keep the class lead.

=== Post-race ===
With a total of 105 points, Jordan Taylor and Ricky Taylor's victory allowed him to increase their advantage over Fittipaldi and Barbosa in the Prototype Drivers' Championship to 16 points. Goikhberg and his co-driver Stephen Simpson advanced from fifth to third. In the GTLM Drivers' Championship, Müller and Hand extended their lead to four points over Garcia and Magnussen, while Westbrook and Briscoe moved from third after being fifth coming into Long Beach. The final results of GTD meant Keating and Blekeeomen further increased their gap to nineteen points as Alessandro Balzan and Christina Nielsen took over the second position. Cadillac, Ford, and Mercedes-AMG continued to top their respective Manufacturers' Championships, while Wayne Taylor Racing, Ford Chip Ganassi Racing, and Riley Motorsports kept their respective advantages in the trio of Teams' Championships with nine races left in the season.

=== Race results ===
Class winners are denoted in bold.

Final race classification
Pos	Class	No.	Team	Drivers	Chassis	Tire	Laps	Time/Retired
Pos	Class	No.	Team	Drivers	Engine	Tire	Laps	Time/Retired
1	**P**	**10**	**(United States) Wayne Taylor Racing**	**(United States) Ricky Taylor (United States) Jordan Taylor**	**Cadillac DPi-V.R**	C	**63**	**01:40:37.481**
1	**P**	**10**	**(United States) Wayne Taylor Racing**	**(United States) Ricky Taylor (United States) Jordan Taylor**	**Cadillac 6.2 L V8**	C	**63**	**01:40:37.481**
2	P	2	(United States) Tequila Patrón ESM	(United States) Scott Sharp (United Kingdom) Ryan Dalziel	Nissan Onroak DPi	C	63	+6.349
2	P	2	(United States) Tequila Patrón ESM	(United States) Scott Sharp (United Kingdom) Ryan Dalziel	Nissan VR38DETT 3.8 L Turbo V6	C	63	+6.349
3	P	55	(Japan) Mazda Motorsports	(United States) Tristan Nunez (United States) Jonathan Bomarito	Mazda RT24-P	C	63	+15.735
3	P	55	(Japan) Mazda Motorsports	(United States) Tristan Nunez (United States) Jonathan Bomarito	Mazda MZ-2.0T 2.0 L Turbo I4	C	63	+15.735
4	P	85	(United States) JDC-Miller MotorSports	(Canada) Mikhail Goikhberg (South Africa) Stephen Simpson	Oreca 07	C	63	+18.176
4	P	85	(United States) JDC-Miller MotorSports	(Canada) Mikhail Goikhberg (South Africa) Stephen Simpson	Gibson GK428 4.2 L V8	C	63	+18.176
5	P	52	(United States) PR1/Mathiasen Motorsports	(United Kingdom) Tom Kimber-Smith (United States) William Owen	Ligier JS P217	C	63	+1:05.741
5	P	52	(United States) PR1/Mathiasen Motorsports	(United Kingdom) Tom Kimber-Smith (United States) William Owen	Gibson GK428 4.2 L V8	C	63	+1:05.741
6	**GTLM**	**4**	**(United States) Corvette Racing**	**(United Kingdom) Oliver Gavin (United States) Tommy Milner**	**Chevrolet Corvette C7.R**	M	**63**	**+1:09.399**
6	**GTLM**	**4**	**(United States) Corvette Racing**	**(United Kingdom) Oliver Gavin (United States) Tommy Milner**	**Chevrolet LT5.5 5.5 L V8**	M	**63**	**+1:09.399**
7	GTLM	67	(United States) Ford Chip Ganassi Racing	(Australia) Ryan Briscoe (United Kingdom) Richard Westbrook	Ford GT	M	63	+1:11.229
7	GTLM	67	(United States) Ford Chip Ganassi Racing	(Australia) Ryan Briscoe (United Kingdom) Richard Westbrook	Ford EcoBoost 3.5 L Twin-turbo V6	M	63	+1:11.229
8	GTLM	912	(United States) Porsche GT Team	(France) Kévin Estre (Belgium) Laurens Vanthoor	Porsche 911 RSR	M	63	+1:11.873
8	GTLM	912	(United States) Porsche GT Team	(France) Kévin Estre (Belgium) Laurens Vanthoor	Porsche 4.0 L Flat-6	M	63	+1:11.873
9	GTLM	25	(United States) BMW Team RLL	(United States) Bill Auberlen (United Kingdom) Alexander Sims	BMW M6 GTLM	M	63	+1:14.238
9	GTLM	25	(United States) BMW Team RLL	(United States) Bill Auberlen (United Kingdom) Alexander Sims	BMW 4.4 L Turbo V8	M	63	+1:14.238
10	GTLM	3	(United States) Corvette Racing	(Denmark) Jan Magnussen (Spain) Antonio García	Chevrolet Corvette C7.R	M	63	+1:25.009
10	GTLM	3	(United States) Corvette Racing	(Denmark) Jan Magnussen (Spain) Antonio García	Chevrolet LT5.5 5.5 L V8	M	63	+1:25.009
11	**GTD**	**50**	**(United States) Riley Motorsports – WeatherTech Racing**	**(United States) Cooper MacNeil (United States) Gunnar Jeannette**	**Mercedes-AMG GT3**	C	**62**	**+1 Lap**
11	**GTD**	**50**	**(United States) Riley Motorsports – WeatherTech Racing**	**(United States) Cooper MacNeil (United States) Gunnar Jeannette**	**Mercedes-AMG M159 6.2 L V8**	C	**62**	**+1 Lap**
12	GTD	33	(United States) Riley Motorsports – Team AMG	(Netherlands) Jeroen Bleekemolen (United States) Ben Keating	Mercedes-AMG GT3	C	62	+1 Lap
12	GTD	33	(United States) Riley Motorsports – Team AMG	(Netherlands) Jeroen Bleekemolen (United States) Ben Keating	Mercedes-AMG M159 6.2 L V8	C	62	+1 Lap
13	GTLM	911	(United States) Porsche GT Team	(France) Patrick Pilet (Germany) Dirk Werner	Porsche 911 RSR	M	62	+1 Lap
13	GTLM	911	(United States) Porsche GT Team	(France) Patrick Pilet (Germany) Dirk Werner	Porsche 4.0 L Flat-6	M	62	+1 Lap
14	GTD	63	(United States) Scuderia Corsa	(Denmark) Christina Nielsen (Italy) Alessandro Balzan	Ferrari 488 GT3	C	62	+1 Lap
14	GTD	63	(United States) Scuderia Corsa	(Denmark) Christina Nielsen (Italy) Alessandro Balzan	Ferrari F154CB 3.9 L Turbo V8	C	62	+1 Lap
15	GTLM	24	(United States) BMW Team RLL	(United States) John Edwards (Germany) Martin Tomczyk	BMW M6 GTLM	M	62	+1 Lap
15	GTLM	24	(United States) BMW Team RLL	(United States) John Edwards (Germany) Martin Tomczyk	BMW 4.4 L Turbo V8	M	62	+1 Lap
16	GTD	73	(United States) Park Place Motorsports	(Germany) Jörg Bergmeister (United States) Patrick Lindsey	Porsche 911 GT3 R	C	62	+1 Lap
16	GTD	73	(United States) Park Place Motorsports	(Germany) Jörg Bergmeister (United States) Patrick Lindsey	Porsche 4.0 L Flat-6	C	62	+1 Lap
17	GTD	991	(United States) TRG	(Germany) Wolf Henzler (Belgium) Jan Heylen	Porsche 911 GT3 R	C	62	+1 Lap
17	GTD	991	(United States) TRG	(Germany) Wolf Henzler (Belgium) Jan Heylen	Porsche 4.0 L Flat-6	C	62	+1 Lap
18	GTD	14	(United States) 3GT Racing	(United States) Scott Pruett (United States) Sage Karam	Lexus RC F GT3	C	62	+1 Lap
18	GTD	14	(United States) 3GT Racing	(United States) Scott Pruett (United States) Sage Karam	Lexus 5.0L V8	C	62	+1 Lap
19	GTD	93	(United States) Michael Shank Racing with Curb Agajanian	(United States) Andy Lally (United Kingdom) Katherine Legge	Acura NSX GT3	C	62	+1 Lap
19	GTD	93	(United States) Michael Shank Racing with Curb Agajanian	(United States) Andy Lally (United Kingdom) Katherine Legge	Acura 3.5 L Turbo V6	C	62	+1 Lap
20	GTD	16	(United States) Change Racing	(United States) Corey Lewis (Netherlands) Jeroen Mul	Lamborghini Huracán GT3	C	62	+1 Lap
20	GTD	16	(United States) Change Racing	(United States) Corey Lewis (Netherlands) Jeroen Mul	Lamborghini 5.2 L V10	C	62	+1 Lap
21	P	70	(Japan) Mazda Motorsports	(United States) Tom Long (United States) Joel Miller	Mazda RT-24P	C	62	+1 Lap
21	P	70	(Japan) Mazda Motorsports	(United States) Tom Long (United States) Joel Miller	Mazda MZ-2.0T 2.0 L Turbo I4	C	62	+1 Lap
22 DNF	GTD	96	(United States) Turner Motorsport	(Germany) Jens Klingmann (United States) Bret Curtis	BMW M6 GT3	C	61	Crash
22 DNF	GTD	96	(United States) Turner Motorsport	(Germany) Jens Klingmann (United States) Bret Curtis	BMW 4.4L Turbo V8	C	61	Crash
23 DNF	GTD	86	(United States) Michael Shank Racing with Curb Agajanian	(United States) Jeff Segal (Brazil) Oswaldo Negri Jr.	Acura NSX GT3	C	61	Crash
23 DNF	GTD	86	(United States) Michael Shank Racing with Curb Agajanian	(United States) Jeff Segal (Brazil) Oswaldo Negri Jr.	Acura 3.5 L Turbo V6	C	61	Crash
24 DNF	GTD	15	(United States) 3GT Racing	(United States) Robert Alon (United Kingdom) Jack Hawksworth	Lexus RC F GT3	C	61	Crash
24 DNF	GTD	15	(United States) 3GT Racing	(United States) Robert Alon (United Kingdom) Jack Hawksworth	Lexus 5.0L V8	C	61	Crash
25	GTD	28	(United States) Alegra Motorsports	(Denmark) Michael Christensen (Canada) Daniel Morad	Porsche 911 GT3 R	C	61	+2 Laps
25	GTD	28	(United States) Alegra Motorsports	(Denmark) Michael Christensen (Canada) Daniel Morad	Porsche 4.0 L Flat-6	C	61	+2 Laps
26	GTD	57	(United States) Stevenson Motorsports	(United States) Andrew Davis (United States) Lawson Aschenbach	Audi R8 LMS	C	61	+2 Laps
26	GTD	57	(United States) Stevenson Motorsports	(United States) Andrew Davis (United States) Lawson Aschenbach	Audi 5.2L V10	C	61	+2 Laps
27	GTLM	66	(United States) Ford Chip Ganassi Racing	(Germany) Dirk Müller (United States) Joey Hand	Ford GT	M	61	+2 Laps
27	GTLM	66	(United States) Ford Chip Ganassi Racing	(Germany) Dirk Müller (United States) Joey Hand	Ford EcoBoost 3.5 L Twin-turbo V6	M	61	+2 Laps
28	GTD	54	(United States) CORE Autosport	(United States) Jon Bennett (United States) Colin Braun	Porsche 911 GT3 R	C	61	+2 Laps
28	GTD	54	(United States) CORE Autosport	(United States) Jon Bennett (United States) Colin Braun	Porsche 4.0 L Flat-6	C	61	+2 Laps
29	P	5	(United States) Mustang Sampling Racing	(Portugal) João Barbosa (Brazil) Christian Fittipaldi	Cadillac DPi-V.R	C	61	+2 Laps
29	P	5	(United States) Mustang Sampling Racing	(Portugal) João Barbosa (Brazil) Christian Fittipaldi	Cadillac 6.2 L V8	C	61	+2 Laps
30	GTD	75	(United States) SunEnergy1 Racing	(United States) Boris Said (France) Tristan Vautier	Mercedes-AMG GT3	C	60	+3 Laps
30	GTD	75	(United States) SunEnergy1 Racing	(United States) Boris Said (France) Tristan Vautier	Mercedes AMG M159 6.2 L V8	C	60	+3 Laps
31	GTD	48	(United States) Paul Miller Racing	(United States) Bryan Sellers (United States) Madison Snow	Lamborghini Huracán GT3	C	53	+10 Laps
31	GTD	48	(United States) Paul Miller Racing	(United States) Bryan Sellers (United States) Madison Snow	Lamborghini 5.2 L V10	C	53	+10 Laps
32 DNF	P	31	(United States) Whelen Engineering Racing	(United States) Dane Cameron (United States) Eric Curran	Cadillac DPi-V.R	C	41	Crash
32 DNF	P	31	(United States) Whelen Engineering Racing	(United States) Dane Cameron (United States) Eric Curran	Cadillac 6.2 L V8	C	41	Crash
33 DNF	P	22	(United States) Tequila Patrón ESM	(United States) Johannes van Overbeek (United States) Ed Brown	Nissan Onroak DPi	C	2	Crash
33 DNF	P	22	(United States) Tequila Patrón ESM	(United States) Johannes van Overbeek (United States) Ed Brown	Nissan VR38DETT 3.8 L Turbo V6	C	2	Crash
34 DNF	GTLM	62	(United States) Risi Competizione	(Finland) Toni Vilander (Italy) Giancarlo Fisichella	Ferrari 488 GTE	M	0	Crash
34 DNF	GTLM	62	(United States) Risi Competizione	(Finland) Toni Vilander (Italy) Giancarlo Fisichella	Ferrari F154CB 3.9 L Turbo V8	M	0	Crash
35 DNS	P	90	(United States) VisitFlorida Racing	(Belgium) Marc Goossens (Netherlands) Renger van der Zande	Riley Mk. 30	C	–	Did not start
35 DNS	P	90	(United States) VisitFlorida Racing	(Belgium) Marc Goossens (Netherlands) Renger van der Zande	Gibson GK428 4.2 L V8	C	–	Did not start

Tyre manufacturers
Key
Symbol	Tyre manufacturer
**C**	Continental
**M**	Michelin

== Standings after the race ==
Prototype Drivers' Championship standings
Pos.	+/–	Driver	Points
1		(United States) Jordan Taylor (United States) Ricky Taylor	105
2		(Portugal) João Barbosa (Brazil) Christian Fittipaldi	89
3	2	(Canada) Misha Goikhberg (South Africa) Stephen Simpson	82
4	2	(United Kingdom) Ryan Dalziel (United States) Scott Sharp	81
5	2	(United States) Dane Cameron (United States) Eric Curran	79

PC Drivers' Championship standings
Pos.	+/–	Driver	Points
1		(United States) James French (Mexico) Patricio O'Ward (United States) Kyle Masson	72
2		(United States) Sean Rayhall	60
3		(United States) Chapman Ducote (Colombia) Gustavo Yacamán	59
4		(United States) Buddy Rice (United States) Don Yount (United States) Mark Kvamme	58
5		(United States) Nicholas Boulle	36

GTLM Drivers' Championship standings
Pos.	+/–	Driver	Points
1		(United States) Joey Hand (Germany) Dirk Müller	91
2		(Spain) Antonio García (Denmark) Jan Magnussen	89
3	2	(Australia) Ryan Briscoe (United Kingdom) Richard Westbrook	82
4		(France) Patrick Pilet (Germany) Dirk Werner	82
5	2	(Italy) Giancarlo Fisichella (Finland) Toni Vilander	82

GTD Drivers' Championship standings
Pos.	+/–	Driver	Points
1		(Netherlands) Jeroen Bleekemolen (United States) Ben Keating	98
2	5	(Italy) Alessandro Balzan (Denmark) Christina Nielsen	77
3		(Canada) Daniel Morad (Denmark) Michael Christensen	75
4	4	(Belgium) Jan Heylen	72
5	1	(United States) Lawson Aschenbach (United States) Andrew Davis	70

- Note: Only the top five positions are included for all sets of standings.

Prototype Teams' Championship standings
Pos.	+/–	Team	Points
1		(United States) #10 Wayne Taylor Racing	105
2		(United States) #5 Mustang Sampling Racing	89
3	2	(United States) #85 JDC-Miller MotorSports	82
4	2	(United States) #2 Tequila Patrón ESM	81
5	2	(United States) #31 Whelen Engineering Racing	79

PC Teams' Championship standings
Pos.	+/–	Team	Points
1		(United States) #38 Performance Tech Motorsports	72
2		(United States) #26 BAR1 Motorsports	61
3		(United States) #8 Starworks Motorsport	58
4		(United States) #20 BAR1 Motorsports	58
5		(United States) #88 Starworks Motorsport	28

GTLM Teams' Championship standings
Pos.	+/–	Team	Points
1		(United States) #66 Ford Chip Ganassi Racing	91
2		(United States) #3 Corvette Racing	89
3	2	(United States) #67 Ford Chip Ganassi Racing	82
4		(United States) #911 Porsche GT Team	82
5	2	(United States) #62 Risi Competizione	82

GTD Teams' Championship standings
Pos.	+/–	Team	Points
1		(United States) #33 Riley Motorsports Team AMG	98
2	5	(United States) #63 Scuderia Corsa	77
3		(United States) #28 Alegra Motorsports	75
4		(United States) #57 Stevenson Motorsports	70
5	1	(United States) #86 Michael Shank Racing with Curb-Agajanian	70

- Note: Only the top five positions are included for all sets of standings.

Prototype Manufacturers' Championship standings
Pos.	+/–	Manufacturer	Points
1		(United States) Cadillac	105
2		(Japan) Nissan	94
3		(Japan) Mazda	92

GTLM Manufacturers' Championship standings
Pos.	+/–	Manufacturer	Points
1		(United States) Ford	99
2		(United States) Chevrolet	98
3	1	(Germany) Porsche	88
4	1	(Italy) Ferrari	86
5		(Germany) BMW	82

GTD Manufacturers' Championship standing
Pos.	+/–	Manufacturer	Points
1		(Germany) Mercedes-AMG	100
2	1	(Germany) Porsche	91
3	1	(Italy) Ferrari	86
4	2	(Germany) Audi	85
5	1	(Japan) Acura	79

- Note: Only the top five positions are included for all sets of standings.

IMSA SportsCar Championship
Previous race: 12 Hours of Sebring	2017 season	Next race: Advance Auto Parts Sportscar Showdown
