= Acura Grand Prix of Long Beach =

Acura Grand Prix of Long Beach may refer to:

- Grand Prix of Long Beach, an IndyCar race.
- Grand Prix of Long Beach (IMSA), an IMSA race.
