= Religion in Denmark =

Religion in Denmark (CIA World Factbook 2024)
1. Lutheranism (71.4%)
2. Islam (4.30%)
3. Other / None (24.3%)

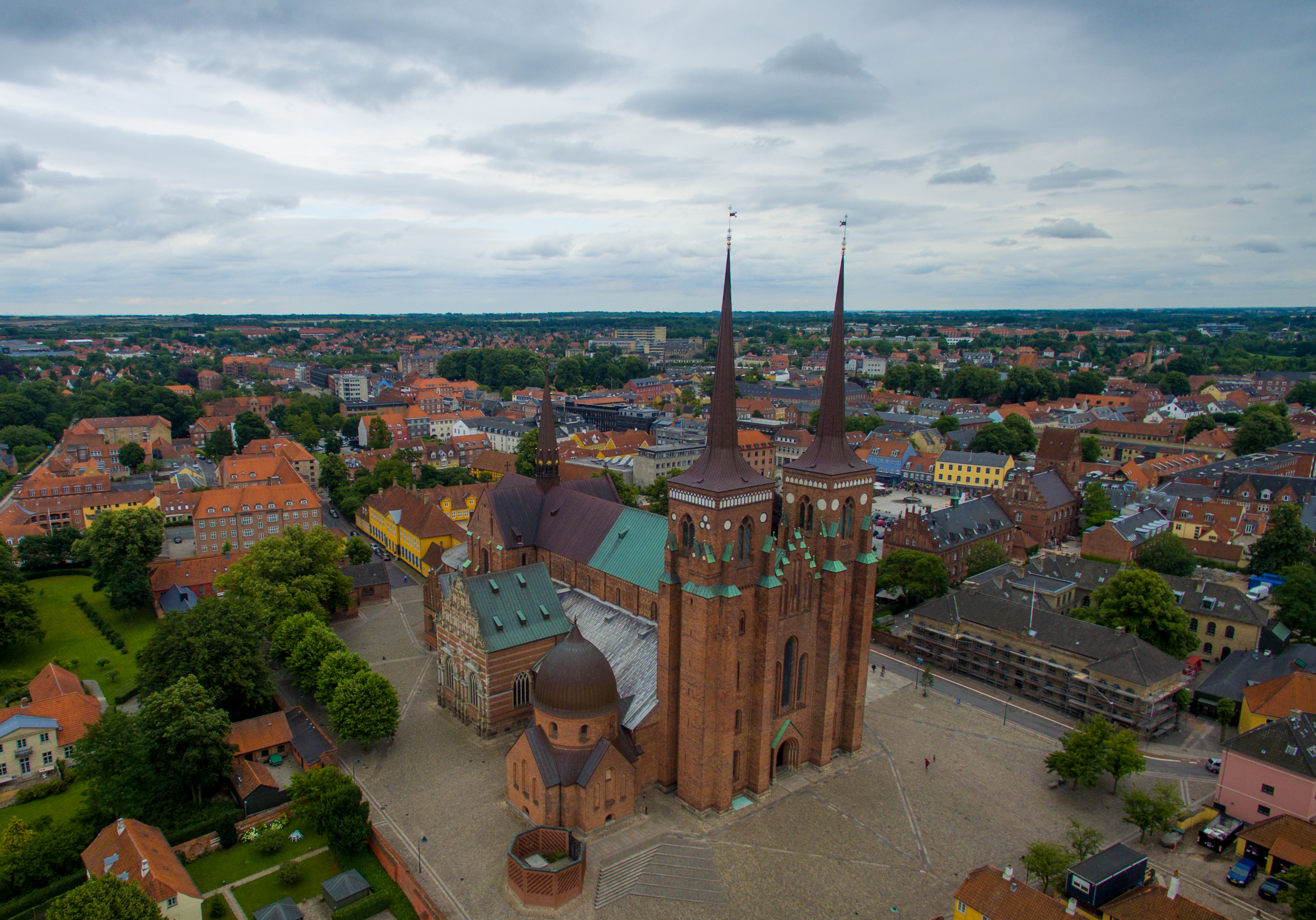
Roskilde Cathedral has been the burial place of Danish royalty since the 15th century. In 1995 it became a World Heritage Site.

Christianity is the largest religion in Denmark. As of 2026, 69.8% of the population of Denmark were registered members of the Church of Denmark (Den Danske Folkekirke), the officially established church, which is Protestant in classification and Lutheran in orientation. (Note: The Church of Denmark is the established church (or state religion) in Denmark and Greenland; the Church of the Faroe Islands became an independent body in 2007.)

== Religiosity ==
According to a Eurobarometer poll conducted in 2010, 28% of Danish citizens responded that "they believe there is a God", 47% responded that "they believe there is some sort of spirit or life force" and 24% responded that "they do not believe there is any sort of spirit, God or life force". Another poll, carried out in 2008, found that 25% of Danes believe Jesus is the son of God, and 18% believe he is a messenger of the God and saviour of the world but not son of God. A Gallup report in 2009 found that only 19% of Danes consider religion to be an important part of their life.

Just under 20% of the Danish population identifies as atheist as of 2013. According to a 2018 report by Pew Research Centre, around 17% of Danes believed God as described in the Bible, while 48% believed in other higher power or spiritual force, and 29% did not believe in any higher power. In terms of certainty of belief, 46% selected the option of 'Do not believe in God'.

== Historical statistics ==
=== Census results (1840–1860) ===
Religion	1840		1845		1850		1855		1860	
Religion	Number	%	Number	%	Number	%	Number	%	Number	%
Church of Denmark	1,277,402	99.56%	1,344,955	99.6%	1,400,955	99.52%	1,489,269	99.29%	1,587,644	99.19%
Judaism	3,839	0.3%	3,670	0.27%	3,941	0.28%	4,143	0.28%	4,214	0.26%
Mormonism	—	—	—	—	—	—	2,044	0.14%	2,657	0.17%
Baptism	—	—	143	0.01%	724	0.05%	1,548	0.1%	2,270	0.14%
Calvinism	915	0.07%	959	0.07%	1,265	0.09%	1,482	0.1%	1,784	0.11%
Catholicism	865	0.07%	583	0.04%	724	0.05%	1,151	0.08%	1,240	0.08%
Irvingism	—	—	—	—	—	—	—	—	202	0.01%
Anglicanism	3	0%	15	0%	103	0.01%	152	0.01%	114	0.01%
Methodism	—	—	—	—	—	—	—	—	42	0%
Eastern Orthodox	1	0%	1	0%	26	0%	19	0%	30	0%
Moravianism	—	—	—	—	—	—	—	—	8	0%
Quakerism	—	—	—	—	—	—	—	—	2	0%
Other religions	2	0%	1	0%	7	0%	23	0%	332	0.02%
No religion	—	—	—	—	2	0.08%	19	0%	12	0%
Total	1,283,027		1,350,327		1,414,539		1,499,850		1,600,551	

=== Census results (1870–1921) ===
Religion	1870		1880		1890		1901		1911		1921	
Religion	Number	%	Number	%	Number	%	Number	%	Number	%	Number	%
Church of Denmark	1,769,583	99.15%	1,951,513	99.11%	2,138,529	98.44%	2,416,511	98.65%	2,715,187	98.48%	3,200,372	97.94%
Catholicism	1,857	0.1%	2,985	0.15%	3,647	0.17%	5,373	0.22%	9,821	0.36%	22,137	0.68%
Baptism	3,223	0.18%	3,687	0.1%	4,556	0.21%	5,501	0.22%	5,664	0.21%	6,989	0.21%
Judaism	4,290	0.24%	3,946	0.2%	4,080	0.19%	3,476	0.14%	5,164	0.19%	5,947	0.18%
Methodism	260	0.01%	746	0.04%	2,301	0.11%	3,895	0.16%	4,284	0.16%	4,858	0.15%
Irvingism	349	0.02%	1,036	0.05%	2,609	0.12%	3,812	0.16%	2,778	0.1%	3,459	0.11%
Adventism	—	—	—	—	—	—	764	0.03%	1,282	0.05%	2,622	0.08%
Calvinism	1,433	0.08%	1,363	0.07%	1,252	0.06%	1,112	0.05%	1,142	0.04%	1,164	0.01%
Eastern Orthodox	12	0%	15	0%	38	0%	106	0%	256	0.01%	535	0.02%
Mormonism	2,128	0.12%	1,722	0.09%	941	0.04%	717	0.03%	797	0.03%	487	0.01%
Moravianism	2	0%	60	0%	—	—	—	—	—	—	463	0.01%
Anglicanism	74	0%	125	0.01%	137	0.01%	176	0.01%	192	0.01%	409	0.01%
Unitarianism	—	—	—	—	—	—	62	0%	147	0.01%	195	0.01%
Quakerism	28	0%	117	0.01%	—	—	66	0%	65	0%	13	0%
Presbyterianism	—	—	21	0%	—	—	—	—	—	—	—	—
Swedenborgianism	—	—	10	0%	—	—	—	—	—	—	—	—
Islam	1	0%	8	0%	—	—	—	—	—	—	—	—
Other Christian	1,297	0.07%	444	0.02%	11,730	0.54%	3,468	0.14%	1,254	0.05%	1,495	0.05%
Other religions	141	0.01%	167	0.01%	412	0.02%	873	0.04%	892	0.03%	3,942	0.12%
No religion	63	0%	1,074	0.05%	2,148	0.1%	3,628	0.15%	8,151	0.3%	12,744	0.39%
Total	1,784,741		1,969,039		2,172,380		2,449,540		2,757,076		3,267,831	

Membership statistics from 1984 to 2008:

Religion	1984		1995		2008	
Religion	Number	%	Number	%	Number	%
Church of Denmark	4,684,060	91.63%	4,539,773	87.04%	4,490,195	81.47%
Other Protestant	10,725	0.21%	49,730	0.95%	43,320	0.79%
Catholic Church	27,387	0.54%	32,367	0.62%	37,123	0.67%
Islam	—	—	—	—	23,540	0.43%
Mormonism	—	—	4,204	0.08%	4,500	0.08%
Eastern Orthodox	250	0%	671	0.01%	9,120	0.17%
Buddhism	—	—	2,459	0.05%	4,448	0.08%
Judaism	2,442	0.05%	3,320	0.06%	2,180	0.04%
Hinduism	—	—	—	—	1,649	0.03%
Norse mythology	—	—	—	—	650	0.01%
Mandaeism	—	—	—	—	600	0.01%
Baháʼí Faith	—	—	277	0.01%	350	0.01%
No membership	387,716	7.58%	582,747	11.17%	858,116	15.57%
Total	5,112,130		5,215,718		5,475,791	

== Christianity ==
The Danish flag is formed by the Nordic Cross, symbol of Christianity.

Church of Denmark
Year	Population	Members	Percentage
1984	5,113,500	4,684,060	91.6%
1990	5,135,409	4,584,450	89.3%
2000	5,330,500	4,536,422	85.1%
2005	5,413,600	4,498,703	83.3%
2010	5,534,738	4,479,214	80.9%
2015	5,659,715	4,400,754	77.8%
2020	5,822,763	4,327,018	74.3%
2025	5,992,734	4,234,315	70.7%
2026	6,025,603	4,217,476	70.0%
2026 Q2	6,031,247	4,211,598	69.8%

Christianity is the predominant religion of Denmark, with two-thirds of the Danish population estimated as adherents of the "Folkekirken" ("People's Church"), Denmark's national Lutheran church. Aside from Lutheranism, there is a small Catholic minority, as well as small Protestant denominations such as the Baptist Union of Denmark and the Reformed Synod of Denmark.

According to official statistics from the second quarter of 2026, 69.8% of the population of Denmark are members of the Evangelical Lutheran Church of Denmark (Den danske folkekirke), the country's state church since the Reformation in Denmark–Norway and Holstein, which is designated "the Danish people's church" by the 1848 Constitution of Denmark. Among those who report Danish ancestry (as opposed to persons of recent immigrant descent), there has been a decline in the proportion who are members of the National Church, from approx. 90% in 1985 to 75.9% in 2017.

There are around 8,000 Christians who have converted from a Muslim background in the country, most of them belonging to some form of Protestantism.

== Minority religions ==
=== Islam ===
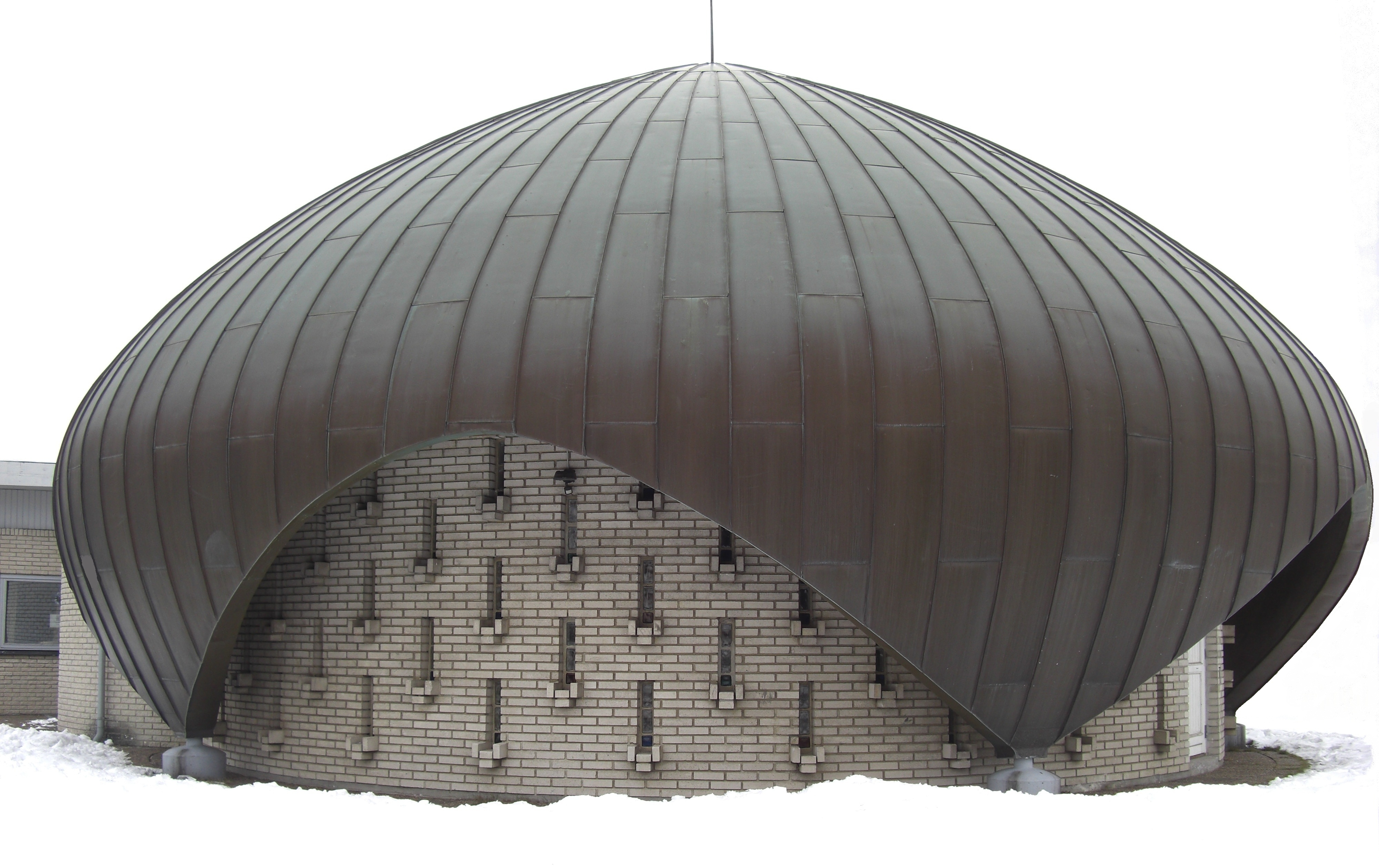
An Ahmadiyya mosque in Hvidovre just outside Copenhagen. The first purpose-built mosque in Denmark.

According to Danish researcher Brian Arly Jacobsen, Muslims living in Denmark make up ca. 256,000 people or approximately 4.4% of the population in 2020 and form the country's second largest religious community and largest minority religion. As of 2017 there were 28 recognised Muslim communities and around 185 mosques in Denmark. Ahmadis constructed the first mosque in the capital, Copenhagen. There were approximately 655 Ahmadis all over Denmark in 2006.

=== Judaism ===
A Jewish community has been present in Denmark since the seventeenth century, when the monarchs began allowing Jews to enter the country and practice their religion on an individual basis. Emancipation followed gradually and by the end of the nineteenth century most Jews were fully assimilated into Danish society. In the early decades of the twentieth century there was an influx of more secular, Yiddish speaking, Eastern European Jews. Nearly 99% of Danish Jews survived the Holocaust, in part due to the actions of the Danish resistance, and to the Swedish authorities' offer of asylum to the Danish Jews.

Today there are approximately 6,000 ethnic Jews in Denmark, 1700 of them being members of the official organization The Jewish Community in Denmark.

=== Baha'i Faith ===
The Baháʼí Faith arrived in Denmark in 1925, but it did not make much impact until the arrival of American pioneers in 1946. A national Spiritual Assembly was formed in 1962. In 2005, it was estimated that there were about 1,251 Baha'is in the country.

=== Buddhism ===
Buddhism in Denmark was brought back from expeditions that explored the Indian subcontinent. Initial interest was mainly from intellectuals, authors, Buddhologists and Philologists. In 1921, Christian F. Melbye founded the first Buddhist Society in Denmark, but it was later dissolved in 1950 before his death in 1953. In the 1950s, there was a revival in interest towards Buddhism, especially Tibetan Buddhism. Hannah and Ole Nydahl founded the first Karma Kagyu Buddhist centers in Copenhagen. The third wave of Buddhism came in the 1980s, when refugees from Vietnam, Sri Lanka and China came to Denmark.

In 2009 Aarhus University estimated that there were 20,000 practising Buddhists in Denmark.

=== Hinduism ===
There are 40,000 (0.5%) Hindus in Denmark as of 2020.

=== Sikhism ===
In Denmark there are about 4,000 Sikhs of Punjabi origin.

== Traditional religions ==
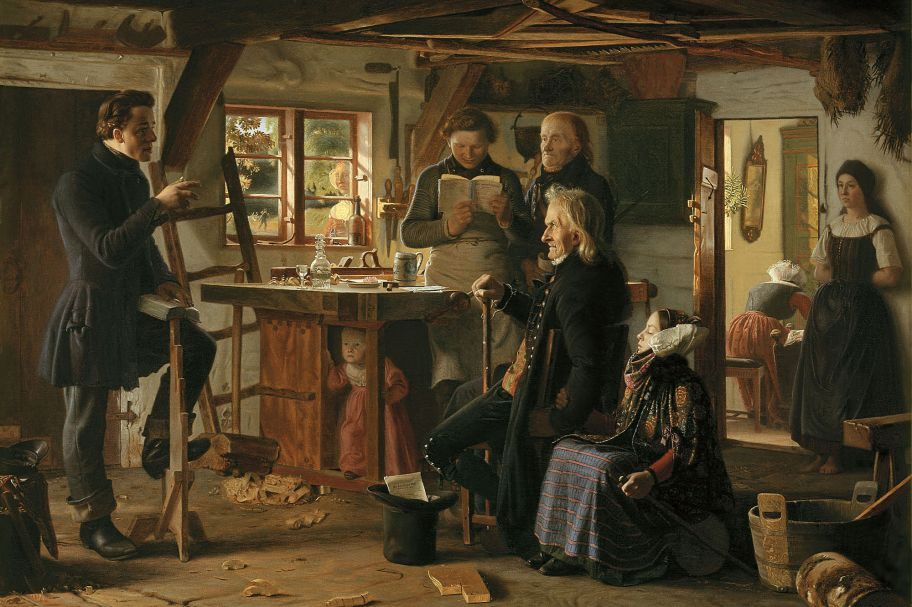
"Mormons visit a country carpenter" (1856) by Christen Dalsgaard, depicting a mid-19th-century visit of a Mormon missionary to a Danish carpenter's workshop. The first Mormon missionaries arrived in Denmark in 1850.

According to a survey of various religions and denominations undertaken by the Danish Foreign Ministry, other religious groups comprise less than 1% of the population individually and approximately 2% when taken all together.

=== Neopaganism ===
A neopagan religious group, Forn Siðr — Ásatrú and Vanatrú Association in Denmark, describes itself as a revival of the Norse paganism prevalent in Denmark before Christianization. It gained state recognition in November 2003. There are about 500 registered heathens (0.01% of the population) adhering to the old Norse beliefs.

In 2016, the designer Jim Lyngvild established the heathen building Manheim in Korinth on Funen.

== Irreligion ==
In 2013, just under 20% of the Danish population identified as atheist. According to Pew 2018, Denmark had 72% that chose religion is 'Not too/not at all' important in their lives, and 62% said they never pray, which were the highest figures being shared with Sweden.

== Politics and government ==
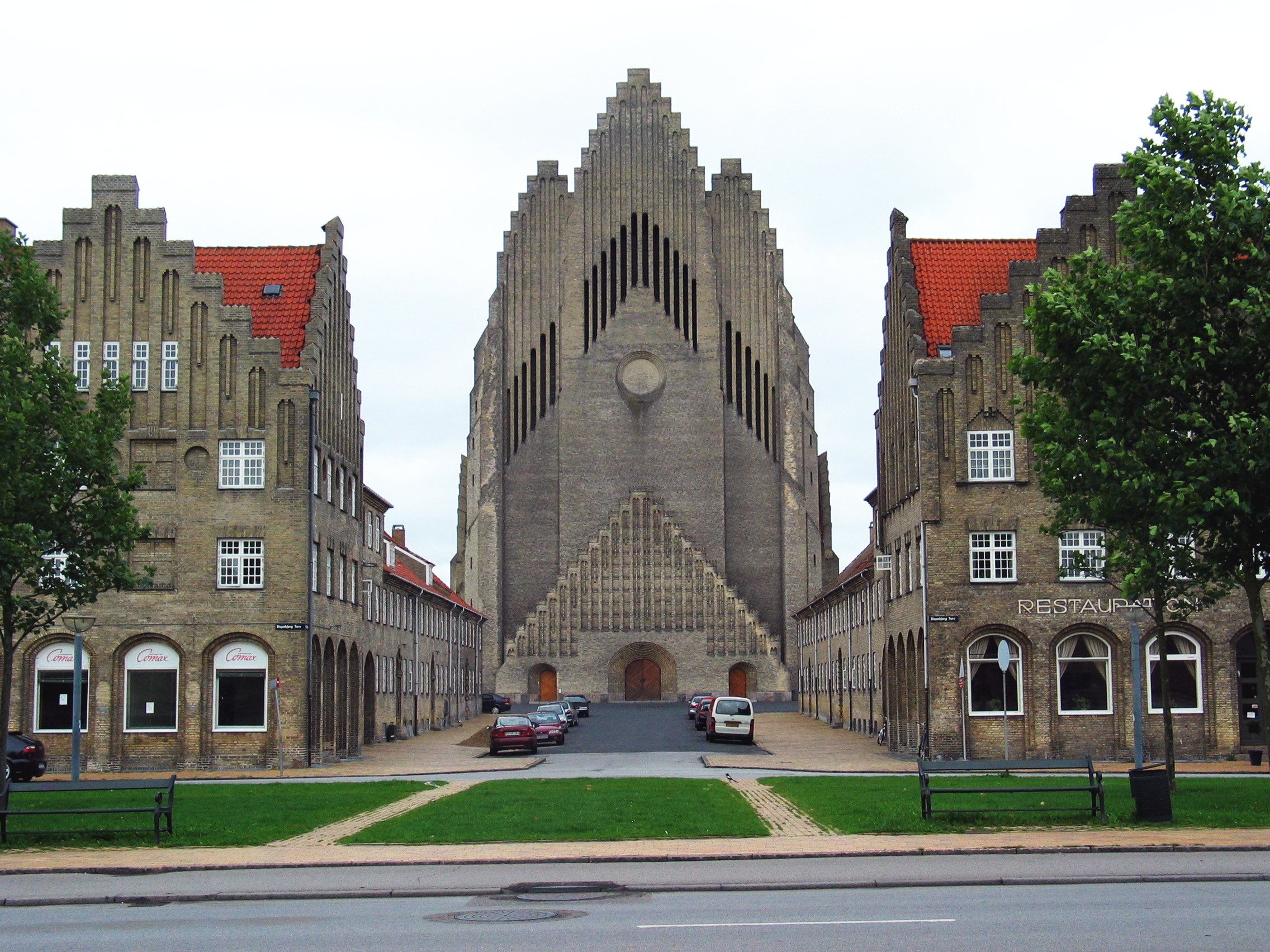
Grundtvig's Church in Copenhagen.

Five of Denmark's prime ministers have identified themselves as atheists: Thorvald Stauning, Vilhelm Buhl, Hans Hedtoft, H. C. Hansen, and Jens Otto Krag.

=== Danish Constitution ===
The Constitution of Denmark contains a number of sections related to religion.

- §4 establishes the Evangelical Lutheran Church of Denmark as the state church of Denmark.
- §6 requires the Danish monarch to be a member of the state church.
- §67 grants freedom of worship.
- §68 states that no one is required to personally contribute to any form of religion other than his own. As state subsidies are not considered personal contributions the Church of Denmark receives subsidies – according to §4 – beyond the church tax paid by the members of the church. The Church of Denmark is the only religious group to receive direct financial support from the state. Other religious groups can receive indirect support through tax deductions on contributions.
- §70 grants freedom of religion by ensuring civil and political rights can not be revoked due to race or religious beliefs. It further states race and religious beliefs can not be used to be exempt from civil duties.
- §71 ensures no one can be imprisoned due to religious beliefs.

== Freedom of religion ==
In its 2024 Freedom in the World report, Freedom House rated the country 4 out of 4 for religious freedom:

Freedom of worship is legally protected. However, the Evangelical Lutheran Church is subsidized by the government as the official state religion. The faith is taught in public schools, though students may withdraw from religious classes with parental consent.

In 2018, a general ban on the public wearing of face coverings, widely referred to as a “burqa ban” applicable to Muslim women, took effect. Between 2018 and 2020, an average of 20 people a year were charged with violating the ban. In 2021, only two charges were filed under the law, and in 2022, only one. Fines for defying the ban range from $150 to $300.

In 2018, Parliament adopted a law requiring mandatory participation in a ceremony for confirmation of newly granted Danish citizenship, with guidelines including a requirement for shaking hands. The provision was viewed as a means of requiring Muslims who refuse to touch someone of a different gender on religious grounds to adopt practices seen as “Danish.” In February 2022, one person was denied citizenship for protesting the law by refusing to shake hands during the citizenship ceremony.

In December 2023, Parliament adopted an amendment to the penal code that criminalized “inappropriate treatment” of religious texts in public, in response to several burnings of the Quran in Denmark and Sweden earlier in the year that sparked anger in some Muslim nations. Filming and distributing a video of such an act was banned as well. Violators face a fine or up to two years in prison. Critics said that the ban was a restraint on freedom of speech.

Denmark is a member of the International Religious Freedom or Belief Alliance.

== See also ==
- Christianization of Scandinavia
- Christianity in Denmark
- Islam in Denmark
  - Jyllands-Posten Muhammad cartoons controversy
- Judaism in Denmark
  - Rescue of the Danish Jews
- Bahá'í Faith in Denmark
- Buddhism in Denmark
- Hinduism in Denmark
- Religion in the Faroe Islands
- Religion in Greenland
