= Bubba Harris =

Personal information
- Full name: Burlin Lucas Harris III
- Nickname: "Bubba"
- Born: August 7, 1985 (age 41)
- Height: 1.83 m (6 ft 0 in)
- Weight: 86.2 kg (190 lb)

Cycling career
- Sport: Cycling
- Discipline: Bicycle Motocross (BMX)
- Role: Racer
- Rider type: Off Road

Amateur teams
- 1993-1994: AXO
- 1994-1999: Answer Products
- 1999: Redline Bicycles

Professional teams
- 1999-2008: Redline Bicycles
- 2009-2010: Answer BMX Products
- 2010-2012: Supercross BMX
- 2012-2012: Doublecross Bikes

Burlin Lucas Harris III (born August 7, 1985, from Palmdale, California U.S.) is an American professional Bicycle Motocross (BMX) racer whose prime competitive years were from 1999 to 2007; serious injuries in 2007 and 2008 affected his racing career ending with his retirement from professional racing around 2013. Harris usually goes by the moniker "Bubba", as did his father when he was young.

Bubba Harris was inducted into the National BMX Hall of Fame as a first ballot nominee for the class of 2023.

== Racing career milestones ==
Note: Professional first are on the national level unless otherwise indicated.

Started racing: August 7, 1992, on his seventh birthday. His father took him to a BMX track and he was hooked.

First race bike: Huffy

Sanctioning body: American Bicycle Association (ABA)

Home sanctioning body district(s): ABA California District 7 (CA-7 1993).

First race result: First place 7 Novice.

First win (local): See above.

First sponsor: AXO approximately in February 1993.

First national win:

Turned Professional: November 2001 Age 16 immediately after the American Bicycle Association (ABA) Grand Nationals. Redline teammate Kim Hayashi also turns pro on this occasion.

First Professional race result:

First Professional win:

First Junior Pro* race result:

First Junior Pro win:

First Senior Pro** race result:

First Senior Pro win: The American Bicycle Association (ABA) Empire Nationals on May 18, 2003, in Kingston, New York.

Status: Not actively racing (last year raced was 2019 in USA BMX Vet Pro)

Height & weight at height of his career: Ht:6'0" Wt:190 lbs.

*In the NBL "B" Pro/Super Class/"A" Pro/Junior Elite Men depending on the era; in the ABA it is "A" Pro.
**In the NBL it is "AA" Pro/Elite Men; in the ABA it is "AA" Pro.

=== Career factory and major bike shop sponsors ===
Note: This listing only denotes the racer's primary sponsors. At any given time a racer could have numerous co-sponsors. Primary sponsorships can be verified by BMX press coverage and sponsor's advertisements at the time in question. When possible exact dates are used.

==== Amateur ====
- AXO Sport: February 1993-Early 1994
- Answer Products, Inc.: Early 1994-November 1999. Harris was the first racer Answer Products ever sponsored.
- Redline Bicycles: November 1999-July 21, 2008. Bubba would turn pro with this sponsor.

==== Professional ====
- Redline Bicycles: November 1999-July 21, 2008. After eight years and eight months with the same sponsor Redline Bicycles released Harris from his contract. In a press release Harris explained why:

"On Monday July 21st, I was released from Redline Bicycles. With my injuries and recent surgery, I was unable to fulfill my obligations under the current contract.

After 8 years with Redline I want to thank them for everything they've done for me. I wish all my teammates the best in the future and will always consider them my teammates. As for me, I will be back and stronger than ever.........you haven't seen the last of me.

While the chapter of my racing career with Redline is closed, I look forward to beginning a new chapter with a new sponsor. I would like to thank my sponsors that have shown their continued support, VISA, Nike, Kronik, Lizard Skins and Inustrial. To all the Bubba Harris fans, I look forward to seeing you at the track very soon. I know this experience will make me a better person and BMXer in the future."

Thank you,

Bubba Harris"

- Answer BMX Products: March 5, 2009 – 2010. After being without a major BMX sponsor since late July 2008 and in recovery from injuries Harris resigns with his second sponsor and first one he came to national prominence with as an amateur. His first race with his old but new sponsor was the ABA Winter Nationals in Phoenix, Arizona, on March 6–8, 2009.
- Supercross BMX: 2010–April 2012. Following over a year of sponsorship with Answer Products, Harris joined the Supercross BMX Factory Team. While on Answer, Harris rode the Supercross ENVY frame-set.
- Doublecross Bikes: April 26, 2012 – November 2012. Less than 2 weeks after announcing his departure from Supercross, Bubba announced he will be taking his talents to Doublecross Bikes. He would remain with them through the 2012 USABMX Grand National Championship.

=== Career bicycle motocross titles ===
Note: Listed are District, State/Provincial/Department, Regional, National, and International titles in italics. Depending on point totals of individual racers, winners of Grand Nationals do not necessarily win National titles. Only sanctioning bodies active during the racer's career are listed. Series and one off Championships are also listed in block.

==== Amateur ====
National Bicycle League (NBL)

American Bicycle Association (ABA)

- 1993 California District 7 (CA-07) No.1
- 1994 10 & Under Cruiser Gold Cup West Champion
- 1994 9 Boys Southern California State Champion
- 1995 9 Boys World Cup Champion
- 1995 9 & Under Cruiser World Cup Champion
- 1995 10 Expert and 10 Cruiser Grandnational Champion
- 1996 10 Expert and 10 Cruiser World Cup Champion
- 1996 11 Expert and 11 Cruiser Grandnational Champion
- 2001 16 Expert and 16 Cruiser No.1

Union Cycliste Internationale (UCI)

USA Cycling BMX:

==== Professional ====
National Bicycle League (NBL)

- None

American Bicycle Association (ABA)

- 2002 Pro Cruiser National No.3
- 2005 Pro Race of Champions (ROC) champion.
- 2004,'05 World Champion
- 2004,'05,'06 National No.1 Pro

International Bicycle Motocross Federation (IBMXF)*

- None (defunct)

Union Cycliste Internationale (UCI)*

- 2005 Elite Men World Champion

USA Cycling BMX:

- None

USA BMX:

- None

=== BMX product lines ===
- Bubba Harris Signature Series of various products:

Redline Aluminum Flight Mini, Flight, Flight Expert, Flight Junior, Flight Pro XL, Flight Pro XXL, Flight Series Cruiser frames and forks.

=== Notable accolades ===
- He is a 2002 ABA BMXer magazine Golden Crank winner for Professional Rookie of the Year.
- He is a 2003, '04, '05, '07 ABA BMXer magazine Golden Crank winner for Professional of the Year.
- He is a 2003,'04,'05 & '07 BMX Plus! Pro of the Year.
- In 2004 Harris became the youngest racer to hold an ABA professional title, becoming ABA No.1 Pro in the 20" class at the age of 18.
- He has become only the second rider in BMX history, and the first in the ABA, to win the Senior Pro 20" class three consecutive times winning the "AA" pro class title in 2004, 2005, and 2006, tying Terry Tenette. Terry Tenette was the first pro racer to do so in 1990,'91 & '92 in the National Bicycle League "A" Pro (Elite Men) class. Other three consecutive title wins have occurred in other classes in the past. Brent Patterson did it prior in the NBL Pro Cruiser class in 1981,'82 & '83 and Cheri Elliott in the ABA's girls amateur 20" division in 1983,'84 & '85. Other racers have done it and exceeded it in other classes since. John Purse came close to doing it in 1997 after winning the title with the NBL in 1995 and 1996 but a crash in the NBL Grand National semi finals ended his bid for a "three-peat". Terry Tenette was still the only one to have done it in 20" Men's Senior Pro until 2006. Bubba Harris would have made it four in a row breaking Tenette's record if he took the 20" AA pro title again in the ABA racing circuit in 2007. However while in preparation for the 2008 Summer Olympics he suffered an ankle injury in Beijing, China on August 20, 2007, that took him out of the running to accomplish that feat.
- He was enshrined into the National BMX Hall of Fame - Class of 2023.

=== Significant injuries ===
- Fractured his arm at the ABA Lonestar Nationals in Beaumont, Texas, on March 5, 2000, after going two years without an injury. He was laid up for approximately three weeks until the weekend of March 26 of the ABA Winternationals in Phoenix, Arizona.
- Fractured shoulder at the Nellis Silver state NBL/UCI National race in Nellis, Nevada, on March 26, 2006. Was laid up for seven weeks until the ABA Dixieland Nationals in Marietta, Georgia, on May 20, 2006.
- Suffered a separated shoulder at the UCI national in Las Vegas, Nevada.
- Suffered a jammed elbow at the UCI Supercross time trials on September 7, 2006, in San Jose, California.
- Exactly one year to the day BMX competition was to start in the 2008 Olympic Games in Beijing, China, he completely dislocated the left ankle at the talus bone on August 20, 2007, in Beijing, China on the official Olympic track during his first run of his Time Trial. Coming out of the second turn he took an extra two pedals before setting up for the jumps. This did not leave him enough time to make the transition smoothly. He hit the first jump of the rhythm section and his right foot became unclipped from that pedal. He hit two successive jumps essentially one footed, his still clipped in left foot taking the weight. He hit a fourth successive jump slightly obliquely and was launched sideways by his momentum into the air, coming down on the back side of a jump with his left foot still clipped into an SPD pedal. It was twisted at approximately a 90 degree angle from its proper position. Doctors almost amputated his foot. After three months of recuperation, he attempted to race the 2007 ABA Grandnationals but reinjured the injury slightly in practice and sat out the Grands. He did race the NBL Christmas Classic on December 27, 2007, but didn't make the mains. Despite the constant pain he is in even just walking, he put off surgery on it to remove bone splinters to speed his recovery in time for the 2008 Olympics. In defiance of the pain, he was able to do relatively well during the 2008 racing season, including winning the Elite Men class at the NBL National in West Palm Beach, Florida, on March 16, 2008.
- Still maintaining Olympic hopes he was in training for the Summer Olympics at a track at the Olympic Training Center in Chula Vista, California. His Olympic dreams for making the 2008 team came to an end when he broke his right ankle in practice for the Olympic Trials on June 12, 2008. Ironically, the training track is an exact replica of the Olympic BMX track that the BMX events for the Beijing Olympics would be held on. His crash was on the second straight. He had hoped that it was a bad sprain but the next day doctors confirmed the break and Harris withdrew his name from the Time Trial competition leaving only seven competitors. On June 14, 2008, Harris saw his good friend Mike Day win the Olympic team Qualifying Trials and qualified for a sure slot on the USA BMX Olympic Team. He was cheering him on straight through. A few days after the Trials Harris had surgery to remove some of the floating bone chips left over in his left ankle from his severe August 20, 2007, dislocation.
- Harris suffered from cracked ribs after a crash at the ABA Silver Dollar Nationals in Reno, Nevada, on the weekend of January 11, 2009. He reportedly fell on his handlebars when he crashed. He returned to racing after a near two month layoff at the ABA Winter Nationals in Phoenix, Arizona, on March 6–8, 2009.

== Post BMX Racing Career ==
- Though no longer racing professionally, Bubba Harris is still active in the BMX community providing coaching and supporting BMX tracks.

== BMX and general press magazine interviews and articles ==
- "The Fabulous Five" Snap BMX Magazine May 2001 Vol. 8 Issue 5 No. 55 pg. 63. One of five short articles with five racers including Donny Robinson, Ian Stoffel, Brandon Nicholls, and Clint Gower.
- "Just Bubba" Moto Mag May/June 2004 Vol. 3 No.3 pg. 22
- "Factory Redline Pros" Transworld BMX November 2004 Vol. 11 Issue 11 No. 97. It is page 17 of the imbedded Redline catalog included in the magazine along with interviews of teammates Kim Hayashi and Jason Carne$.
- "BMX camp, weekend event features some of best riders" Greeley Tribune, August 11, 2005, newspaper article.
- "#1 on #1" BMX Plus! June 2006 Vol. 29 Nol.6 pg. 68 Bubba Harris and Mike Day interview each other.

== BMX magazine covers ==
Note: Only magazines that were in publication at the time of the racer's career(s) are listed unless specifically noted.

BMX Plus!:

Snap BMX Magazine & Transworld BMX:

Moto Mag:

- None

Twenty BMX:

- April 2005 Vol.1 No.1

BMX World (2005 version)

- April 2006/May 2006 Vol.1 Iss.3 (1) leading three unidentified racers.

Bicycles Today & BMX Today (The official NBL publication under two names):

ABA Action, American BMXer, BMXer (The official ABA publication under three names):
