= Grand Prix of Long Beach (IMSA) =

Sports car race held in Long Beach, California

Acura Grand Prix of Long Beach

IMSA SportsCar Championship
- Venue: Long Beach Street Circuit
- Location: Long Beach, California; 33°45′59″N 118°11′34″W
- Corporate sponsor: Acura (Honda)
- First race: 1990
- First IMSA race: 2014
- Last race: 2026
- Duration: 1 hour and 40 minutes
- Most wins (driver): (Germany) Lucas Luhr (4)
- Most wins (team): (United States) Chip Ganassi Racing (4)
- Most wins (manufacturer): (United States) Cadillac (6)

Circuit information
- Length: 1.968 mi (3.167 km)
- Turns: 11

The Acura Grand Prix of Long Beach is an endurance race for sports cars held at Long Beach Street Circuit in Long Beach, California, United States as part of the IMSA SportsCar Championship. Previous editions of the Grand Prix belonged to the IMSA GT Championship, Rolex Sports Car Series and the American Le Mans Series. The race currently has a duration of 1 hour and 40 minutes and takes place in April.

== History ==
The inaugural race was held in 1990 for GTO and GTU competitors in the IMSA GT Championship. Dorsey Schroeder won the race despite losing the hood and front fenders of his Mercury Cougar. In 1991, Steve Millen claimed the overall win after contact between the leading pair of Robby Gordon and Pete Halsmer.

After a 15-year absence, sports cars returned to the streets of Long Beach with the Grand-Am Rolex Sports Car Series in a 90-minute sprint. Luis Díaz and Scott Pruett won the race in a Riley Mk XX-Lexus.

== Results ==
Year	Overall winner(s)	Entrant	Car	Duration	Race title	Championship	Report	Ref
IMSA GT Championship
1990	(United States) Dorsey Schroeder	(United States) Whistler Radar	Mercury Cougar	1 Hour	Toyota Grand Prix of Long Beach	IMSA GT Championship	report	
1991	(New Zealand) Steve Millen	(United States) Cunningham Racing	Nissan 300ZX	1 Hour	Toyota Grand Prix of Long Beach	IMSA GT Championship	report	
1992–2005	Not held							
Rolex Sports Car Series
2006	(Mexico) Luis Díaz (United States) Scott Pruett	(United States) CompUSA Chip Ganassi with Felix Sabates	Riley Mk XX-Lexus	1 Hour, 30 Minutes	Grand American Challenge	Rolex Sports Car Series	report	
American Le Mans Series
2007	(Germany) Timo Bernhard (France) Romain Dumas	(United States) Penske Racing	Porsche RS Spyder Evo	1 Hour, 40 Minutes	Toyota Grand Prix of Long Beach	American Le Mans Series	report	
2008	(Germany) Lucas Luhr (Germany) Marco Werner	(United States) Audi Sport North America	Audi R10 TDI	1 Hour, 40 Minutes	Tequila Patrón American Le Mans Series at Long Beach	American Le Mans Series	report	
2009	(Brazil) Gil de Ferran (France) Simon Pagenaud	(United States) de Ferran Motorsports	Acura ARX-02a	1 Hour, 40 Minutes	Tequila Patrón American Le Mans Series at Long Beach	American Le Mans Series	report	
2010	(Australia) David Brabham (France) Simon Pagenaud	(United States) Patrón Highcroft Racing	HPD ARX-01c	1 Hour, 40 Minutes	Tequila Patrón American Le Mans Series at Long Beach	American Le Mans Series	report	
2011	(Germany) Klaus Graf (Germany) Lucas Luhr	(United States) Muscle Milk Aston Martin Racing	Lola-Aston Martin B09/60	2 Hours	Tequila Patrón American Le Mans Series at Long Beach	American Le Mans Series	report	
2012	(Germany) Klaus Graf (Germany) Lucas Luhr	(United States) Muscle Milk Pickett Racing	HPD ARX-03a	2 Hours	Tequila Patrón American Le Mans Series at Long Beach	American Le Mans Series	report	
2013	(Germany) Klaus Graf (Germany) Lucas Luhr	(United States) Muscle Milk Pickett Racing	HPD ARX-03a	2 Hours	Tequila Patrón American Le Mans Series at Long Beach	American Le Mans Series	report	
IMSA SportsCar Championship
2014	(United States) Scott Pruett (Mexico) Memo Rojas	(United States) Chip Ganassi Racing with Felix Sabates	Riley MkXXVI-Ford	1 Hour, 40 Minutes	Tequila Patrón Sports Car Showcase	United SportsCar Championship	report	
2015	(United States) Jordan Taylor (United States) Ricky Taylor	(United States) Wayne Taylor Racing	Dallara Corvette Daytona Prototype	1 Hour, 40 Minutes	Tequila Patrón Sports Car Showcase	United SportsCar Championship	report	
2016	(United States) Jordan Taylor (United States) Ricky Taylor	(United States) Wayne Taylor Racing	Dallara Corvette Daytona Prototype	1 Hour, 40 Minutes	BUBBA Burger Sports Car Grand Prix	IMSA SportsCar Championship	report	
2017	(United States) Jordan Taylor (United States) Ricky Taylor	(United States) Wayne Taylor Racing	Cadillac DPi-V.R	1 Hour, 40 Minutes	BUBBA Burger Sports Car Grand Prix	IMSA SportsCar Championship	report	
2018	(Portugal) Filipe Albuquerque (Portugal) João Barbosa	(United States) Mustang Sampling Racing	Cadillac DPi-V.R	1 Hour, 40 Minutes	BUBBA Burger Sports Car Grand Prix	IMSA SportsCar Championship	report	
2019	(Portugal) Filipe Albuquerque (Portugal) João Barbosa	(United States) Mustang Sampling Racing	Cadillac DPi-V.R	1 Hour, 40 Minutes	BUBBA Burger Sports Car Grand Prix	IMSA SportsCar Championship	report	
2020	Not held							
2021	(Brazil) Pipo Derani (Brazil) Felipe Nasr	(United States) Whelen Engineering Racing	Cadillac DPi-V.R	1 Hour, 40 Minutes	Acura Grand Prix of Long Beach	IMSA SportsCar Championship	report	
2022	(France) Sébastien Bourdais (Netherlands) Renger van der Zande	(United States) Cadillac Racing	Cadillac DPi-V.R	1 Hour, 40 Minutes	Acura Grand Prix of Long Beach	IMSA SportsCar Championship	report	
2023	(France) Mathieu Jaminet (United Kingdom) Nick Tandy	(United States) Porsche Penske Motorsport	Porsche 963	1 Hour, 40 Minutes	Acura Grand Prix of Long Beach	IMSA SportsCar Championship	report	
2024	(France) Sébastien Bourdais (Netherlands) Renger van der Zande	(United States) Cadillac Racing	Cadillac V-Series.R	1 Hour, 40 Minutes	Acura Grand Prix of Long Beach	IMSA SportsCar Championship	report	
2025	(Brazil) Felipe Nasr (United Kingdom) Nick Tandy	(United States) Porsche Penske Motorsport	Porsche 963	1 Hour, 40 Minutes	Acura Grand Prix of Long Beach	IMSA SportsCar Championship	report	
2026	(United Kingdom) Nick Yelloly (Netherlands) Renger van der Zande	(United States) Meyer Shank Racing with Curb-Agajanian	Acura ARX-06	1 Hour, 40 Minutes	Acura Grand Prix of Long Beach	IMSA SportsCar Championship	report	

=== Records ===
==== Drivers with multiple wins ====
Rank	Driver	Wins	Years
1	(Germany) Lucas Luhr	4	2008, 2011–2013
2	(Germany) Klaus Graf	3	2011–2013
2	(United States) Jordan Taylor	3	2015–2017
2	(United States) Ricky Taylor	3	2015–2017
2	(Netherlands) Renger van der Zande	3	2022, 2024, 2026
6	(United States) Scott Pruett	2	2006, 2014
6	(France) Simon Pagenaud	2	2009–2010
6	(Portugal) Filipe Albuquerque	2	2018–2019
6	(Portugal) João Barbosa	2	2018–2019
6	(Brazil) Felipe Nasr	2	2021, 2025
6	(France) Sébastien Bourdais	2	2022, 2024
6	(United Kingdom) Nick Tandy	2	2023, 2025

==== Wins by constructor ====
Rank	Constructor	Wins	Years
1	(United States) Cadillac	6	2017–2019, 2021–2022, 2024
2	(Germany) Porsche	3	2007, 2023, 2025
2	(United States) HPD	3	2010, 2012–2013
4	(United States) Riley Technologies	2	2006, 2014
4	(United States) Acura	2	2009, 2026
4	(Italy) Dallara	2	2015–2016
7	(United States) Mercury	1	1990
7	(Japan) Nissan	1	1991
7	(Germany) Audi	1	2008
7	(United Kingdom) Lola Cars	1	2011

==== Wins by engine manufacturer ====
Rank	Manufacturer	Wins	Years
1	(United States) Cadillac	6	2017–2019, 2021–2022, 2024
2	(Germany) Porsche	3	2007, 2023, 2025
2	(Japan) Honda	3	2010, 2012–2013
4	(United States) Acura	2	2009, 2026
4	(United States) Chevrolet	2	2015–2016
6	(United States) Mercury	1	1990
6	(Japan) Nissan	1	1991
6	(Germany) Audi	1	2008
6	(United Kingdom) Aston Martin	1	2011
6	(Japan) Lexus	1	2006
6	(United States) Ford	1	2014
