= Kira Eggers =

Danish model (born 1974)

Kira Eggers (born November 29, 1974) is a former model with an international career. She worked for Playboy TV, The Sun and other firms. Eggers is former guest editor for FHM. In 2006 her memoir, The Naked Truth, was published by Aschenhoug.

She runs two private gyms: one at a spa in Hornbæk and another at an office property in Copenhagen. As an independent entrepreneur she runs HOB, a company with a primary focus on online activities. Eggers has her own fitness blog and was formerly a blog agent for Bloggers Delight, where she headed their celebrity commercial blog build up. Some of these blogs rank as the most visited in Denmark with over 2 million page views per month. Among these are the likes of Mascha Vang.

Eggers starred in the Discovery Channel/TLC program On your own body: Kira Eggers as bodybuilder in 2012. Then she added to her education as a fitness instructor, personal trainer and nutritionist.

In June 2011, she was involved in a series of promotional photos for PETA and has served on the board of OASA and other animal rights organisations.

She's featured on the cover of the 2004 tribute album Spin the Bottle: An All-Star Tribute to KISS.
