= Manheim (hof) =

Modern Pagan religious building

General information
- Location: Hågerupvej 33, 5600 Faaborg, Denmark
- Coordinates: 55°09′52.5″N 10°20′28.5″E
- Opened: 30 May 2016
- Owner: Jim Lyngvild
- Height: 12 metres (39 ft)

Manheim is a heathen hof in Korinth in Faaborg-Midtfyn Municipality, Denmark. The building opened in 2016 and is dedicated to the Norse gods. It is owned by the designer Jim Lyngvild, a practitioner of Heathenry.

== History ==
The building was built at the instigation of the Danish designer Jim Lyngvild and is the first pagan hof in Denmark since the time of the Middle Ages. It was built in three weeks by Lyngvild and a group of friends, and was finished by the end of March 2016.

The inauguration took place on 30 May 2016. Participating at the event were Lyngvild's friends Pia Kjærsgaard, Speaker of the Danish Parliament, who cut the ribbon, and Inger Støjberg, the Danish Minister for Integration, who performed the naming ceremony, naming the building Manheim (lit. 'Home of Man') in beer. Kjeld Holm, a former Bishop of Aarhus, called it "grotesque" that the two politicians had participated at the event, saying that they never would have done the same for a mosque.

== Architecture and design ==
Manheim is located near Lyngvild's home, the "viking castle" Ravnsborg, at the town Korinth on Funen. It is 12 meters high and has a floor area of 6 × 13 meters. The design was inspired by the excavations of the Uppåkra temple in Scania.

== See also ==
- List of modern pagan temples
- Religion in Denmark
