= Mascha Vang =

Danish blogger, model and media personality

- Born: Marianne Vang Christensen; 31 July 1979 (age 47); Byrsted, Himmerland, Denmark
- Occupations: Blogger; model
- Children: 1

Mascha Marianne Vang Christensen (born 31 July 1979) is a Danish blogger, model, radio and television personality.

== Early life ==
Vang was born and raised in Byrsted in Himmerland, 20 km (12 mi) south of Aalborg. Her father was a hauler and drove with a fodder, and her mother was a homemaker. Her original name was Marianne, at her father's request, while her mother preferred Mascha. Vang herself prefers Mascha and has used the name officially. She was trained as a cosmetologist in Aalborg, a makeup artist in Kolding, worked in a clothing store in Odense, was an apprentice at Bahne in Næstved and had been at a hairdressing school for six months.

== Career ==
Vang started her career in the reality show Villa Medusa in the year 2000, where the participants, who were all without money in their pockets, had to find work in a tourist area to get rent and housekeeping. Villa Medusa was a predecessor of Big Brother. Her big breakthrough came in 2005, when she cast reality television series the Paradise Hotel, which led to her being nicknamed the "busty blonde". In 2008, she participated in Zulu Djævleræs, where she was on a team with Simon Talbot, and they went on to the semifinals and later to the finals. In addition, she was a participant in the DR program Høvdingebold, as chief of "Coverbabes". In 2010, she starred in 4-stjerners Middag and Fangerne på Fortet. In 2011, she participated in Zulu Gumball together with Pelle Hvenegaard and Karsten Green. She has also participated in MasterChef and Dit hjem i vores hænder.

Vang has been a radio host on the DR channel P5000 and has previously hosted The Voice TV. She has made several photo sessions for the monthly men's magazine FHM, and together with Kira Eggers and Anne Lindfjeld has also had a sex mailbox in the magazine. She is the director of the blog network Blogly.

In 2013, Vang was the most searched Danish person on Google, and a survey from 2016 put her in the top five of Danish fashion bloggers.

== Personal life ==
Together with racing driver Nicolas Kiesa, Vang has a daughter, Hollie Nolia, who was born on 5 October 2012.

On 12 January 2014, while Vang was at Casper Christensen's nightclub, Sunday Club, she and Eggers were beaten down by a man who, according to the weekly Her & Nu, is a friend of football player Nicki Bille. On her Facebook page, Eggers announced that after a night at Rigshospitalet's Trauma Center, she was okay under the circumstances.

In 2014 and 2015, Vang dated comedian Andreas Bo.
