= Bubba =

American term of endearment to boys

In American usage, "Bubba" is a term of endearment mainly given to boys. Being formed from the word "brother", it often indicates that someone is an "older brother".

== Etymology and history ==
The linguist Ian Hancock has described similarities between the African Krio language and Gullah, the creole language of the Black people of the isolated Sea Islands of South Carolina, and points out that the Krio expression bohboh ('boy') appears in Gullah as buhbuh, which may account for the "Bubba" of the American South.

Robert Ferguson notes in his book English Surnames that "Bubba" corresponds with the German Bube, "boy". This matches Saxon and Hibernian tradition.

Because of its association with the southern part of the United States, "Bubba" is also often used outside the South as a pejorative to mean a person of low economic status and limited education. "Bubba" may also be taken to mean one who is a "good ol' boy". At times, it may be used as a term of endearment (or in an insulting sense) for a person, especially to a man, who is either overweight or has a seemingly powerful large body frame.

== Other meanings ==
In the US Army and Marines, "Bubba" can mean a lazy soldier, similar to "grunt", but with connotations of endearment instead of derision (e.g., "Can you make that device easier to work with, because every Bubba is going to have to use it?").

The word exists in other languages and carries similar meanings. "Bubba" is common in Australia and New Zealand as a noun to refer affectionately to a baby. For example, in Australia, the Queensland State Government has a baby immunisation programme called "BubbaJabs" for Aboriginal babies within Queensland.

In gun culture, "Bubba" is a term used for a person who permanently alters or modifies historic firearms, with no regard for its historical value, or as a verb or adjective to describe the act of or an already modified historical firearm.

In Yiddish, the word Bobe [with a vowel similar to a shortened version of the vowel of caught + beh] means "grandmother" and as a form of address, is often rendered by English speakers as "Bubba" or "Bubbie".

== People ==
=== Nickname ===
- Al Baker (born 1956), American former National Football League player
- Bubba Bolden (born 2000), American football player
- Bubba Brooks (1922–2002), American jazz tenor saxophonist
- Andre Caldwell (born 1985), American former National Football League player
- Bubba Carpenter (born 1968), American Major League Baseball player in 2000
- Lester Carpenter (born 1970), American politician
- Bubba Cathy (born 1954), American businessman
- Bubba Chaney (born 1946), American politician
- Bubba Chandler (born 2002), American Major League Baseball pitcher
- Bubba Church (1924–2001), former Major League Baseball player
- Bill Clinton (born 1946), 42nd president of the United States
- Bubba Copeland (1974–2023), American politician and pastor who committed suicide after explicit material he had posted online was noticed
- Bubba Crosby (born 1976), American Major League Baseball outfielder
- Bubba Dickerson (born 1981), American PGA Tour golfer
- Tommy Facenda (1939–2022), rockabilly singer and dancer
- Bubba Franks (born 1978), National Football League player
- Bubba Green (1957–2019), American football player
- Bubba Harris (born 1985), American former BMX racer
- Bubba Jenkins (born 1988), American mixed martial artist and former amateur wrestler
- Bubba Jennings (born 1960s), American college basketball coach and former player
- William Kennedy (rugby league, born 1969), Australian former rugby league footballer
- Merald "Bubba" Knight (born 1942), soul singer, member of the group Gladys Knight & the Pips
- Bubba Marriott (born 1938), American football player
- Bubba McDaniel (born 1983), American mixed martial artist
- Bubba Morton (1931–2006), American Major League Baseball player and first African-American coach in any sport at the University of Washington
- Bubba Nickles (born 1997), American softball player
- Bubba Paris (born 1960), American former National Football League player
- Bubba Phillips (1928–1993), American Major League Baseball player
- Bubba Pollard (born 1987), American stock car racing driver
- Bubba Schweigert (born 1962), American former college football coach
- Bubba Scott (1927–2012), American college football coach and athletics administrator
- Bubba Shobert (born 1961), American former motorcycle racer
- Bubba Smith (1945–2011), American National Football League player and actor
- Clinton "Bubba" Smith, on the reality television show Storage Wars: Texas
- Bubba Starling (born 1992), American Major League Baseball player
- James Stewart Jr. (born 1985), American former motocross rider
- Wy'Kevious "Bubba" Thomas (born 2000), American football player
- Leslie "Bubba" Thompson (born 1998), American former Major League Baseball player and current college football player
- Kerry Underwood, American politician elected in 2022
- Ray Ventrone (born 1982), American football coach and former National Football League player
- Bubba Wallace (born 1993), American stock car racing driver
- Bubba Watson (born 1978), American golfer
- Bubba Wells (born 1974), American basketball coach and former National Basketball Association player
- Bubba Wilson (born 1955), American former basketball player

=== Middle name ===
- Bubba Trammell (born 1971), former Major League Baseball player

=== Stage name ===
- Bubba Ray Dudley (born 1971), American professional wrestler
- Bubba Sparxxx (born 1977), Southern rapper
- Bubba the Love Sponge Clem (born 1966), radio talk show host

== Fictional characters ==
=== Film and television ===
- Bubba the Caveduck from The Walt Disney Company's series DuckTales
- Bubba Bexley, a recurring character in the sitcom Sanford and Son
- Bubba Bixby, in the 2007 television film Shredderman Rules
- Bubba Bo Bob Brain, Brain's fictitious country music star persona from a Pinky and the Brain segment on the U.S. cartoon series Animaniacs
- Plumber Bubba, a fictional comedian based on Larry the Cable Guy and idolized by Rusty and Early Cuyler on the Adult Swim animated series Squidbillies
- Benjamin Buford "Bubba" Blue, in the 1994 film Forrest Gump, portrayed by Mykelti Williamson
- Landry Clarke, played by Jesse Plemons in the television series Friday Night Lights
- Bubba Hendershot, a leading antagonistic-character from the Stephen King directorial debut film Maximum Overdrive, portrayed by Pat Hingle
- Bubba Higgins, in the sitcom Mama's Family
- Bubba Ho-tep, a name given to a re-animated Egyptian mummy by Elvis Presley in Joe R. Lansdale's novella and film of the same name
- Bubba J, a puppet of ventriloquist Jeff Dunham
- Bubba Ritter, played by Larry Drake in the movie Dark Night of the Scarecrow
- Leatherface, or Bubba Sawyer, from The Texas Chain Saw Massacre
- Bubba Skinner, a leading character from the television series In the Heat of the Night
- Ross "Bubba" Webster, in the 1983 superhero film Superman III, played by Robert Vaughn
- Bubba Zanetti, in the 1979 film Mad Max

=== Games ===
- Bubba, one of the protagonists in the Amiga computer game Bubba 'n' Stix
- Bubba, a character in Jagged Alliance 2
- Bubba, a zombie in an event of Killing Floor
- Bubba, a monster from Rampage: Total Destruction
- Bubba, one of the protagonists of Redneck Rampage
- Bubba, a giant fish in Super Mario 64
- Bubba, one of the protagonists of the original Grand Theft Auto

=== Literature ===
- Bubba, a minor character in A Drink Before the War
- Bubba, a character in Charlaine Harris' Southern Vampire Mysteries series and a "codename" for Elvis, who is now a vampire in this series
- Alvin "Bubba" Bixby, the bully in Wendelin Van Draanen's Shredderman series
- Bubba Kelly, a character in Carson McCullers' novel The Heart Is a Lonely Hunter

== Fish ==
- Bubba (fish) (c. 1982–2006), the first fish known to have undergone chemotherapy

== See also ==
- Bubber, a nickname
- Sissy, a similar nickname for girls, from "sister"
