= Kim Hayashi =

American bicycle motocross rider (born 1986)

Personal information
- Full name: Kimberly M. Hayashi
- Nicknames: "Lil Kim", "Shorty", "Kim Woo", "Kim Chi", "Lil Sushi", "Krashin' Kim", etc.
- Born: January 27, 1986 (age 40) Honolulu, Hawaii, United States
- Height: 1.47 m (4 ft 10 in)
- Weight: 58.1 kg (128 lb)

Cycling career
- Sport: Cycling
- Current team: Speedline / Supercross BMX
- Discipline: Bicycle Motocross (BMX)
- Role: Racer
- Rider type: Off Road

Amateur teams
- 1998-2000: Gordy's Bike Shop
- 2000: Enigima Factory Team
- 2000-2001: Redline Bicycles

Professional teams
- 2001-2008: Redline Bicycles
- 2009-2010: Gordy's Bike Shop
- 2010-Present: Speedline / Supercross BMX

Kimberly M. Hayashi (born January 27, 1986, in Honolulu, Hawaii, United States) is an American professional "New/Current School" Bicycle Motocross (BMX) racer whose prime competitive years are from 2000–Present. Her many nicknames include: "Lil Kim", "Shorty", "Midget", "Sushi Roll", "Kim Woo", Lil Sushi, et al. all references to her diminutive 4' 10", 128 lbs. stature. She is also known as "Krashin' Kim" for her penchant to crash in races. She crashed in her first lap in her very first professional race in 2002 colliding with another rider. Despite this she would become the National Bicycle League (NBL)'s five consecutive number one professional women's racer from 2002 to 2007, which caused her to pick up yet another descriptive nickname: "Tenacious K".

== Racing career milestones ==
Note: Professional first are on the national level unless otherwise indicated.

Started Racing: 1998 at age 12 in Chandler, Arizona, at the Chandler BMX track. Her brother introduced her to the sport.

Sanctioning Body: American Bicycle Association (ABA)

First race result:

First race bike: Gary Fisher

First win (local):

First sponsor: 1999 Gordy's Bike Shop.

First national win:

Turned Professional: November 2001 at age 15 immediately after the American Bicycle Association (ABA) Grand Nationals. Redline teammate Bubba Harris also turns pro on this occasion.

First Professional* race result:

First Professional win:

First Junior Women race result:

First Junior Women win:

First Elite Women** race result:

First Elite Women win:

Retired: Still active. She had plans to retire after participating in the 2008 Beijing Summer Olympics but her Olympic bid was quashed when she failed to make it out of the qualifying rounds at the UCI World Championships in Taiyuan, China. Jill Kintner qualified as the United States sole female BMX Olympic participant. She intends to keep on racing with the 2012 Summer Olympics as her goal (See "Post BMX career" section).

Height & weight at height of her career (2002–Present): Ht: 4'10". Wt:128 lbs.

*In the ABA only one level of professional class. No equivalent of the NBL/UCI's Junior Women class exist. The NBL/UCI Junior Women division is a Pro/Am class. A professional 16-year-old in the ABA must race in UCI Junior Women because you must be 17 years old or older to race in Elite Women. The NBL does have a dedicated Women's Pro class separate from the UCI.
**The NBL/UCI Elite Women division is a Pro Am class. You must be 17 years old and older to race in the Elite class.

=== Career factory and major bike shop sponsors ===
Note: This listing only denotes the racer's primary sponsors. At any given time a racer could have numerous ever changing co-sponsors. Primary sponsorships can be verified by BMX press coverage and sponsor's advertisements at the time in question. When possible exact dates are used.

==== Amateur/Junior ====
- Gordy's Bike Shop: 1999-Early 2000
- Enigma Factory Team: -September 2000
- Redline Bicycles: September 2000-December 31, 2008. Kim Hayashi would turn professional with this sponsor.

==== Professional/Elite ====
- Redline Bicycles: October 2000-December 31, 2008. The 2008 ABA Grand National was the last race for Hayashi on Redline. Hayashi's contract with Redline Bicycles will end on December 31, 2008. On December 11, 2008, Redline sent a press release thanking Hayashi for her years of service. Excerpt:

Redline would like to thank Kim for her service and dedication these past 9 years, and wishes her the best of luck in her future - whether it be going for Olympic qualification in 2012, racing part-time for the Gordy’s team, or going on to become an Orthodontist. We know first hand that whatever Miss.Hayashi sets her sights on, she will give it more than 100% and blasts toward completion of that goal as if a World title were on the line. That is something that the sport of BMX Racing, along with riding for team Redline, has taught her. “Always give it your all.”

- Gordy's Bike Shop: Mid 2009–2010. Hayashi returns to her original sponsor as she mounts her comeback in professional women's BMX to position herself for the 2012 London Summer Olympics.
- Speedline/Supercross BMX: 2010-Current - Kim was added as the second Elite Women on the Speedline / Supercross BMX team at the end of 2010. Gordy's Bikes is still a proud co-sponsor of Kim's

=== Career bicycle motocross titles ===
Note: Listed are District, State/Provincial/Department, Regional, National, and International titles in italics. Only sanctioning bodies that were active during the racer's career are listed. Depending on point totals of individual racers, winners of Grand Nationals do not necessarily win National titles. Series and one off Championships are also listed in block.

==== Amateur/Junior ====
National Bicycle League (NBL)

- 1999, 2000 Arizona State Girls Champion.

American Bicycle Association (ABA)

- 2001 15 Girls World Cup Champion
- 2001 15 Girls Race of Champions (RoC) Champion.
- 2001 14-16 Cruiser Grandnational Champion
- 2000 & 2001 National Amateur Girl's Cruiser No.1

Union Cycliste Internationale (UCI)*

- 2002 18 & Under Women Cruiser Challenge World Champion*

*Even though she was a professional racer in the ABA by the time the 2002 UCI World Championships were held on July 27–29, she was still only 16 years old at that time and per UCI rules had to race in the youth and/or amateur division of the cruiser classes as part of the Challenge Championships, the championship races for those 16 years and younger that were held the day before the Adult and/or Professional classes in the UCI World Championships.

==== Professional/Elite ====
National Bicycle League (NBL)

- 2003 Girls Pro Grandnational Champion
- 2004 Elite Women and 14 & Over Girls Open Grandnational Champion (Doubled)
- 2003, '04, '05, '06, '07 Elite Women National No.1

American Bicycle Association (ABA)

- 2006 Pro Girls Grandnational Champion

Union Cycliste Internationale (UCI)*

- 2004 Junior Women's Pro World Champion

USA Cycling BMX:

Independent Pro Series Championships and Invitational Races

- 2006 RM59 Tropical BMX Challenge Pro Women Champion.

The Robbie Miranda 59 (RM59) Tropical BMX Challenge is an Invitational BMX exhibition race created and promoted by professional BMX racer Robbie Miranda (whose father is Puerto Rican) in Barceloneta, Puerto Rico. It is sanctioned by the Puerto Rican BMX Association (PRBMXA) for the local amateur racers who come out to race and see the BMX stars they only see in the BMX Press since no nationals are held by any major sanctioning body in Puerto Rico.

=== Significant injuries ===
- Broke her arm in early 2008.

=== Racing traits and habits ===
Tended to crash, earning the moniker "Krashin' Kim". She had a four-year annual first main crash streak during the ABA Grand Nationals until the 2006 edition in which she not only didn't crash in the first main, but was the Grand National winner. She achieved this it is said because she was all but mathematically out of contention for the No.1 Pro Girl title (she didn't win the title despite winning the event).

== Post BMX career ==
She had plans on retiring after the 2008 Beijing Olympics if she had made it on to the US Olympic BMX team. She had plans to focus on Dental School and become an orthodontist from then on. However her Olympic bid ended when she failed to make it out of the qualifying rounds at the UCI World Championships in Taiyuan, China. Jill Kintner qualified as the United States sole female BMX Olympic participant. She finished out the 2008 season but suffering from injuries sustained in crashes. On December 3, 2008, she had surgery on an injured shoulder incurred in a crash. However, she fully intends to keep racing after recovering from her surgery and rehabilitation. She also intends to compete in the 2012 Summer Olympics in London, England. As she said in a December 29, 2008, post in Vintagebmx.com under her screen name of Redlinegirlkh:

I just had surgery on Dec 3rd and I WILL be back. Don't count me out for 2012 because I have the experience from this past year and I know what it takes to be a champion.

== BMX press magazine interviews and articles ==
- "Factory Redline Pros" Transworld BMX November 2004 Vol.11 Iss.11 No.97. It is page 17 of the imbedded Redline catalog included in the magazine along with interviews of teammates Bubba Harris and Jason Carne$.
- "Ruff Rider Kim "Lil' Kim" Hayashi-BMX" Vibe Magazine August 2008 Vol.16 No.7 Photo of Hayashi with a brief article of her preferences in Hip-Hop music.

== BMX magazine covers ==
Note: Only magazines that were in publication at the time of the racer's career(s) are listed unless specifically noted.

BMX Plus!:

Snap BMX Magazine & Transworld BMX:

Moto Mag:

- July/August 2003 Vol.2 No.3 (5) ahead of three unidentifieds. At bottom stylized photo of racer Dale Holmes.

BMX World:

Bicycles Today & BMX Today (The NBL official membership publication under two names):

- BMX Today October 2007 in lower right hand corner.

ABA Action, American BMXer, BMXer (The ABA official membership publication under three names):
