= Bubber =

Bubber is a nickname and surname which may refer to:

People:

- Bubber or Bubba Brooks (1922–2002), American jazz tenor saxophonist
- James Bubber Epps (born 1943), American politician
- Clarence James Bubber Jonnard (1897–1977), American Major League Baseball catcher
- James "Bubber" Miley (1903–1932), American jazz trumpet and cornet player
- Charles M. Murphy (coach) (1913–1999), American football, basketball and baseball player and Middle Tennessee State University head coach
- Riva Bubber, Indian television actress
- Bubber or Niels Christian Meyer (born 1964), Danish television host

Fictional characters:

- Charlie "Bubber" Reeves, a main character in the 1966 film The Chase, played by Robert Redford
- John Bubber, a main character in the 1992 film Hero, played by Andy Garcia
- Bernard "Bubber" Surle, the main character in the short story "The Cookie Lady" by Philip K. Dick

== See also ==
- Bubba

Bubber Kelly, in The Heart is a Lonely Hunter by Carson McCullers. He is one of two of Mick Kelly's younger brothers. He reverts to George Kelly, his given name, after accidentally shooting Baby.
