= Jim Lyngvild =

Danish designer

Jim-Martin Alexandar Konstantin Falke-Skjold Wegener Lyngvild
- Born: Jim Martin Alexandar Lyngvild; 27 December 1978 (age 47); Holbæk, Denmark
- Education: Fashion Design Akademiet
- Occupations: Designer, writer, fashion columnist
- Spouse: Morten Paulsen (2007–)

Jim Lyngvild (born 27 December 1978) is a Danish designer, writer, photographer, fashion columnist and television personality.

== Career ==
Lyngvild grew up in Albertslund and was educated at Fashion Design Akademiet in Copenhagen in 2000–2002.

He writes about fashion for the newspaper Ekstra Bladet. He has also written several books.

He has participated in a number of reality television shows including Robinson Ekspeditionen 2005, Til middag hos.., 4-stjerners Middag, 4-stjerners Rejse, Zulu Djævleræs and Britain's Got Talent in 2009.

In 2018 Lyngvild designed an exhibition about the Viking Age for the National Museum of Denmark. This led to some criticism of the museum for having hired a non-scholar at a time when it recently had fired 34 employees, including several experts on the Viking Age. In 2021 he created a series of photographs for an exhibition at the Køge Museum where ten famous Danish women posed as völvas, a type of pre-Christian seeress. The series created a public polemic because one of the models was Ane Halsboe-Jørgensen, recently appointed Minister for Culture and Ecclesiastical Affairs. Lyngvild said she participated in her role as Minister for Culture and he would not have asked her if she only had been Minister for Ecclesiastical Affairs.

== Personal life ==
Lyngvild is homosexual and married his husband Morten in 2007. The couple live in their 400 square meter "viking castle" Ravnsborg in southwestern Funen. Lyngvild adheres to Scandinavian polytheism, asatro, and says that the faith is an important part of his life. He designed and built the religious building Manheim close to his home in 2016.

== Bibliography ==
=== Children's and young adult fiction ===
- Nordisk mytologi (Carlsen, 2009)
- Skyggernes bog (Carlsen, 2009)
- Alfemod og ulveblod (Carlsen, 2010)
- Epos og enhjørningen (Carlsen, 2010)
- Urials krone (Carlsen, 2010)
- Skyggernes bog: på opdagelse i eventyrlandet Anglesey (Carlsen, 2011)
- Kongen: Skyggernes bog & Urials krone (Carlsen, 2012)

=== Factbooks ===
- Vild med heste (Carlsen, 2012)
- Vild med vikinger (Carlsen, 2013)
- Vild med mode (Carlsen, 2013)

=== Fashion and lifestyle ===
- Mary – prinsesse med stil (Aschehoug, 2006)
- Skøn som du er (Nyt Nordisk Forlag, 2007)
- Eye wear: fashion, styling & makeup (Frands Jensen A/S, 2010)
- Ja, vi skal giftes! (Politikens Forlag, 2010)
- Vild med Mary (Politikens Forlag, 2011)
- Europas kronprinsesser (Politikens Forlag, 2012 co-written with Karen Seneca)
- Mit vilde vikingekøkken (Lindhardt & Ringhof, 2013)

=== Novels ===
- Schyyy -! (Lindhardt & Ringhof, 2010)

=== Autobiography ===
- Møgunge (Politikens Forlag, 2016)

== External sources ==
- Jim Lyngvild at IMDb
