= Terry Tenette =

American bicycle motocross rider (born 1968)

Personal information
- Full name: Terry Tenette
- Nickname: "Mr. T"
- Born: August 10, 1968 (age 58) Palo Alto, California, United States
- Height: 1.83 m (6 ft 0 in)
- Weight: 90.7 kg (200 lb)

Cycling career
- Sport: Cycling
- Current team: Tenette Health and Wellness
- Discipline: cycling
- Role: Racer
- Rider type: Off Road

Amateur teams
- 1979: Jack's Cyclery
- 1980-1983: Woodside Bicycle Shop
- 1984: Boss Racing Frames
- 1985: CW Racing
- 1985-1986: U.S. Boss Racing Products
- 1986-1987: GT Racing
- 1987: MCS Bicycles Specialties

Professional teams
- 1988: MCS Bicycles Specialties
- 1988: MCS Bicycles/Eagle Snacks
- 1988: Peddle Power (bicycle shop)
- 1988-1989: Vans
- 1989-1990: Vans/MCS Bicycles
- 1991-1994: Vans
- 1994-1995: Cyclecraft
- 1995-1996: Ross
- 1996-1997: X-treme
- 2001: Vans/Calabazas Cyclery
- 2001: Atlas Bike Company/Ox
- 2002: NorCal
- 2003: Munger/Ox
- 2004: Maxim USA
- 2006: Rift Bicycles

Terry "Mr. T" Tenette (born August 10, 1968) is a professional Cyclist Road biking/gravel road racing/mountain biking BMX/bicycle motocross racer whose prime competitive years were from 1987 to 2010. Tenette also competed and was a team member of the USA Olympic velodrome team 2002 to 2004 as an Olympic alternate for the Athens Olympics finishing second place at the Olympic trials which was not good enough to go to Athens. Tenette continued racing World Cup Velodrome until 2008 and then switch back to mountain biking. Tenette also competed on the Ritchey mountain bike team as an R&D specialist being sent to Taiwan/Philippines testing products. 2009 to 2015 California downhill mountain bike champion Northstar resort tahoe N V. state finals. Tenette was inducted into the cycling Hall of Fame June 2016.

His nickname "Mr. T" is an allusion to the alliteration of his given and family name, both starting with the letter "T". It is also an incidental reference to the American actor with the stage name "Mr. T" who played a character on the popular 1980s American television show The A-Team, Sgt. Bosco "B.A." Baracus.

== Racing career milestones ==
Note: All first in Pro Class are on the national level unless otherwise noted.

Started Racing: July 24, 1978 Introduced to the sport by a friend named Greg Hill. NOT the BMX racer but a childhood friend. Mr. Tenette raced at the Fred Watson Park track in San Jose, California

Sanctioning Body:

Sanctiong body district(s): American Bicycle Association (ABA) California 15 (CA-15) (1984); CA-19 (1985)

First race result: First place in 9 novice.

First win (local): See above.

First sponsor: Jack's Cyclery; Woodside Bicycle Shop.

First national win:

Turned professional: November 1987 Age 19.

First Professional race result: First place in "A" pro at the 1987 American Bicycle Association (ABA) Grand Nationals on November 29 in Oklahoma City, Oklahoma. He won US$800, or the equivalent of US$1,448.59 in 2007 (Cost of Living Calculator). He also won Pro Cruiser, winning US$330 (US$597.54) and came in sixth in Pro Open, winning US$150 (US$271.61).

First Professional win: See above:

First Junior Pro* race result: See above

First Junior Pro win: See above

First Senior Pro** race result: First in "AA" pro at the ABA Gilley's National in Pasadena, Texas on March 26, 1988. He won US$700, or US$1,267.52 in 2007 dollars. He also won "AA" pro the next day, winning US$875, US$1,584.40 2007.

First Senior Pro win: See above.

Retired: Still active in Veteran Pro and Masters classes. 2018. Height & weight at height of career (1994–1998): Ht:6'0" Wt:200 lbs.

*In the NBL "AA Elite" pro depending on the era; in the ABA " Elite pro.
**In the NBL "A"/"Elite Men" pro; in the ABA Elite pro.

=== Career factory and major bike shop sponsors ===
Note: This listing only denotes the racer's primary sponsors. At any given time a racer could have numerous ever-changing co-sponsors. Primary sponsorships can be verified by BMX press coverage and sponsor's advertisements at the time in question. When possible exact dates are given.

==== Amateur ====
- Jack's Cyclery: 1981
- Woodside Bicycle Shop: 1981-1983
- Boss Racing Frames: January 1984-December 1984.
- CW (Custom Works) Racing: January 1985-June 1985.
- U.S. Boss Racing Products: June 1985-December 1986. Boss had changed their name slightly since the last time Terry Tenette was on their team.
- GT (Gary Turner) Racing: December 28, 1986-early August 1987. Terry Tenette was removed from the GT factory team for drug use after he was caught with marijuana and drug paraphernalia. He was previously given a warning a month prior after GT detected a problem but he apparently disregarded the warning and was subsequently released from the team after being caught with the controlled substance. Terry Tenette stated THC was used for recovery after National events+ for sleep insomnia being made a scapegoat for five other racers. Fellow Senior pro Kevin Hull was sent home from the team on suspicion and apparently on guilt by association alone since he and Tenette often were off together. Hull demanded and received a polygraph test. He passed and was allowed to rejoin the GT team in time for the IBMXF World Championships in Orlando, Florida held on the weekend of August 8. The various factory team sponsors were taking a vigorous zero tolerance policies particularly ever since the revelations of Ronnie Anderson's admitted 10 year drug THC habit as he revealed in quotes in the December 8, 1986 issue of Sports Illustrated and rumors and accusations of anabolic steroid use by top pro racer Pete Loncarevich which were never substantiated. GT's spokesman Shawn Buckley made this statement about Tenette's dismissal (excerpt):
  "This is a clean sport with a good reputation. Drugs are not a major problem in BMX, but if we let this kind of thing go on, it could become one. --Shawn Buckley BMX Plus! November 1987.

In a later interview with BMX Action Terry Tenette made this statement:

"I just think GT blew it 'cause I think they could've used me as an example to sell more bikes, like they do in baseball. They could've kept me in there and let people know that there was an issue with THC they threw me out in the street, like 'We don't need you! Beat it!'" --Terry Tenette BMX Action August 1988.

Other than alleging that what GT did was unlawful search and seizure, Terry at this stage and time never denied GT's allegations against him.no drug test was ever given to Tenette . t

- MCS (Moto Cross Specialties) Bicycle Specialties: Mid August 1987-August 1993 Tenette was signed to the MCS racing team out of Fort Lauderdale Florida two weeks after he was fired from GT. Tenette would turn pro with this sponsor. Tenette dominated the pro class two 4 USA national championship wins, and in 2018 still holds the bicycle Motocross record in the palm of his hands and inducted into the cycling Hall of Fame 2016 in Chula Vista California at the USA Olympic Training Center June 4, 2016. 2018 tenette is now married to a beautiful 39 year old from Costa Rica and is looking at starting electric bicycle tour group in Costa Rica still living in Redwood City in a one-bedroom condominium but being priced out of Silicon Valley by the likes of Facebook Google and Apple tenette mentioned his Futures in Costa Rica and looking at having his first child at 49 years old.

Mr. T can be found at local cycling events mentoring the youth and competing for fun in age group amateur level events. On Facebook and Instagram, he updates of his whereabouts in pictorials.

==== Professional ====
- MCS Bicycle Specialties: Mid August 1987-August 1988. In August 1988 MCS joined with Eagle Snacks to form a combined race team.
- MCS Bicycles/Eagle Snacks: August 1988-November 1988. MCS claimed that it fired Terry Tenette because of a "bad attitude". Tenette claims he had quit, went on strike as it were, pending a better offer from MCS for his services. Lawrence Rybko, the owner of MCS said they "...couldn't come to terms." for a new contract.
- Peddle Power (bicycle shop): November 1988-December 1988
- Vans (Van Doren Rubber Company): Late December 1988-November 1989. Vans has not yet merged with the MCS team after Eagle Snacks reduced its BMX race effort.
- Vans/MCS Bicycles: November 1989-December 1990 The Vans and MCS race teams merged near the end of 1989. By the end of 1990 Eagle Snacks dropped out of the BMX scene.
- Vans: January 1991-September 1994. Vans and MCS separated after the 1990 racing season.
- Cyclecraft: December 1994-mid 1995
- Ross: 1995-1996
- X-treme: 1996-1997
- Vans/Calabazas Cyclery: Early 2001-June 2001
- Atlas Bike Company/OX Industries: June 2001-
- NorCal: 2002
- Munger/OX Industries: 2003
- Maxim USA: 2004 Tennette was also the Regional Sales and Promotions Representative for Maxim Sports Nutrition at this time.
- Psykopath: 2006–Present

=== Career bicycle motocross titles ===
Note: Listed are District, State/Provincial, Regional, National, and International titles in italics. "Defunct" refers to the fact of that sanctioning body in question no longer existing at the start of the racer's career or at that stage of his/her career. Depending on point totals of individual racers, winners of Grand Nationals do not necessarily win National titles. Series and one off Championships are also listed in block.

==== Amateur ====
National Bicycle Association (NBA)

National Bicycle League (NBL)

American Bicycle Association (ABA)

- 1984 California District 15 (Cal-15) No.1
- 1985 Winter Season 17 Expert District Age Group (DAG) California 19 (CA-19) champion
- 1986 17 & Over Expert and 17-21 Cruiser Grandnational Champion.
- 1986 National No.2 Overall and 17 & Over Expert National No.1. This was for his age class only. The overall National No.1 Amateur for 1986 was Eric Carter.
- 1986 National No.2 Cruiser Overall and 17-21 Cruiser National No.1. This was for his age class only. The overall National No.1 Cruiser for 1986 was Matt Hadan.

United States Bicycle Motocross Association (USBA)

- None

International Bicycle Motocross Federation (IBMXF)

- 1986 17 Expert Murray World Cup V Champion.

==== Professional ====
National Bicycle Association (NBA)

- None

National Bicycle League (NBL)

- 1990, 1991, 1992 National No.1 Pro.
- 2006 Elite Masters Grand National Champion

American Bicycle Association (ABA)

- 1987 "A" Pro and Pro Cruiser Grandnational Champion
- 1988 AA Pro Race of Champions (ROC) Champion
- 1993 National No.1 Pro Cruiser.

United States Bicycle Motocross Association (USBA)

- None

International Bicycle Motocross Federation (IBMXF)

- None

Pro Series Championships

=== Notable accolades ===
- He was named number one of BMX Action magazine's The Terrible Ten of 1987 of top amateurs and future pros.
- He is the winner of the 1989 BMX Plus! "Racer Of The Year" award with 15.8% of the vote out of 6,517 cast. He won Honda NX125 street legal motocross motorcycle.
- Terry Tenette was the first pro racer to win the Senior Pro 20" class three consecutive times: 1990,'91 & '92 in the National Bicycle League "A" Pro (Elite Men) class. Brent Patterson did it previously in the NBL Pro Cruiser class in 1981,'82 & '83 and Cheri Elliott in the ABA's girls amateur 20" division in 1983,'84 & '85. Other racers have done it and exceeded it in other classes since but Terry Tenette was still the only one to have done it in 20" Men's Senior Pro in any sanctioning body until 2006. John Purse came close to matching it in 1997 in the NBL after winning in 1995 and 1996. He was leading the points totals going into the 1997 NBL Grand Nationals by one point over Christophe LeVeque. A crash in the semi-finals ended John Purse pursuit of a "three-peat". However, 14 years after Terry set the record, current top pro 20" racer Bubba Harris who won the national pro 20" number one title with the ABA in 2004 and 2005 has equaled Terry's record by winning the ABA National No.1 plate on November 26, 2006 in Tulsa, Oklahoma. He can make it four in a row breaking Tenette's record if he takes the 20" AA pro title again in either the ABA or NBL racing circuit in 2007 and becomes the first to quadruple with any sanctioning body. Terry still retains the distinction of being the only one who has done it three consecutive times with the NBL.

=== Racing traits and habits ===
- Tenette was known for often giving the "thumbs up" sign when photographed.

=== Miscellaneous ===
Like fellow BMX racer Pete Loncarevich, Mr. Tenette had a heavy interest in body building, and was often pictured displaying his physique in BMX publications.

== BMX press magazine interviews and articles ==
- "Terry Tenette & Trademarks" BMX Action August 1988 Vol.13 No.8 pg.40
- "Terry Tenette" BMX Plus! June 1989 Vol.12 No.6 pg.36 His Racer of the Year interview.
- "N.C.B: Nor Cal Boys" BMX Action August 1989 Vol.14 No.8 pg.23 Joint article with Cecil Johns.
- "Mister 'T'" Bicross & Skate Magazine Avril (April) 1990 No.87 pg.40 French language BMX and Skateboarding magazine.
- "BMX Plus! RAP" BMX Plus! January 1991 Vol.14 No.1 pg.26 A short interview with Terry Tenette.
- "Terry "Mr. T" Tenette: NBL's #1 Pro!" BMX Plus! December 1991 Vol.14 No.12 pg.37 A short blurb interview with the 1991 No.1 pro.
- "Vans' Grand Slam! Taking a stand on BMX!" BMX Plus! April 1992 Vol.15 No.4 pg.35 Interviews with Tenette and his teammates Pete Loncarevich, Steve Veltman and Racer/Team manager Everette Rosecrans.
- "#1 PRO cruiser terry tenette" American BMXer November 1994 Vol.16 Iss.10 pg.42
- "From One Track to Another" Transworld BMX May 2003 Vol.10 Iss.5 No.79 pg.32 An article written by pro BMX racer Jason Richardson the described the tryouts on a Velodrome track at USA Cycling's United States Olympic Training Center (USOTC) from January 8 to 14 2003 with Steven Alfred (track racer), Jason Carnes, Kenth Fallen, Rob Lindstrom (track racer), Darrin Mitchell, John Purse, Craig Reynolds, Richardson himself, Greg Romero, Randy Stumpfhauser and Terry Tennette. Following the lead of Jamie Staff making the British Track Cycling team some of his fellow BMX racers explored the possibility of trying out the track racing discipline with the idea of going to the Olympics. This was done Just before the announcement on June 30, 2003 by the International Olympic Committee (IOC) of their making BMX Racing an Olympic sport beginning in 2008.

== BMX magazine covers ==
Bicycle Motocross News:

- None

Minicycle/BMX Action & Super BMX:

Bicycle Motocross Action & Go:

BMX Plus!:

- September 1987 Vol.10 No.9 in bottom insert (2) with Craig Marsh (4). In upper left insert freestyler Krys Dauchy. Main image is freestyler Dennis McCoy.

Total BMX:

Bicycles and Dirt (Published by the ABA):

- None

Snap BMX Magazine & Transworld BMX:

Moto Mag:

NBA World & NBmxA World (The official NBA/NBmxA membership publication):

Bicycles Today & BMX Today (The official NBL membership publication which changed its name once.)

ABA Action, American BMXer, BMXer (The official ABA membership publication under three names):

- American BMXer July 1987 Vol.9 No.6 (2) with J. Richards (4)
- American BMXer January/February 1988 Vol.10 No.1

USBA Racer (The official USBA membership publication):
