= Bubba Foods =

American meat products company

Bubba Foods, LLC
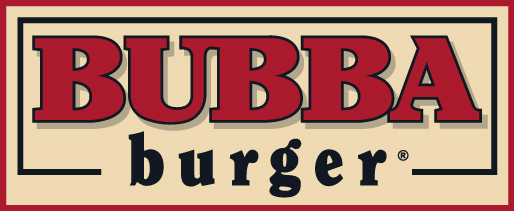
- Company type: LLC
- Industry: Food
- Founded: 1995
- Headquarters: 4339 Roosevelt Boulevard Suite 400, Jacksonville, Florida 32210
- Area served: United States
- Key people: Walter Eaves, Founder
- Products: Frozen food
- Website: bubbafoods.com

Bubba Foods is an American producer of frozen burgers, founded in 1995. Their primary product, Bubba Burger, is made with USDA Choice beef chuck. They also produce turkey burgers, veggie burgers, and snack bites.

== History ==
Bubba Burger was created by Walter "Bubba" Eaves in 1995. Distribution of Bubba Burgers began with grocery stores in the south-eastern United States and then expanded across the United States.

Based in Jacksonville, Florida, Bubba Foods, LLC employs 150 people across all of its sites.

== Products ==
The varieties of Burger including Beef, Turkey, Veggie, and Snack Bites are available.

== See also ==
- List of frozen food brands
