= Jamarion =

Jamarion is a given name. Notable people with the name include:

- Jam Miller (Jamarion Miller; born 2004), American football player
- Jamarion Robinson (died 2016), American man killed by police
- Jamarion Sharp (born 2001), American basketball player
- Jamarion Wilcox (fl. 2023), American football player
