= Ned Overend =

American racing cyclist (born 1955)

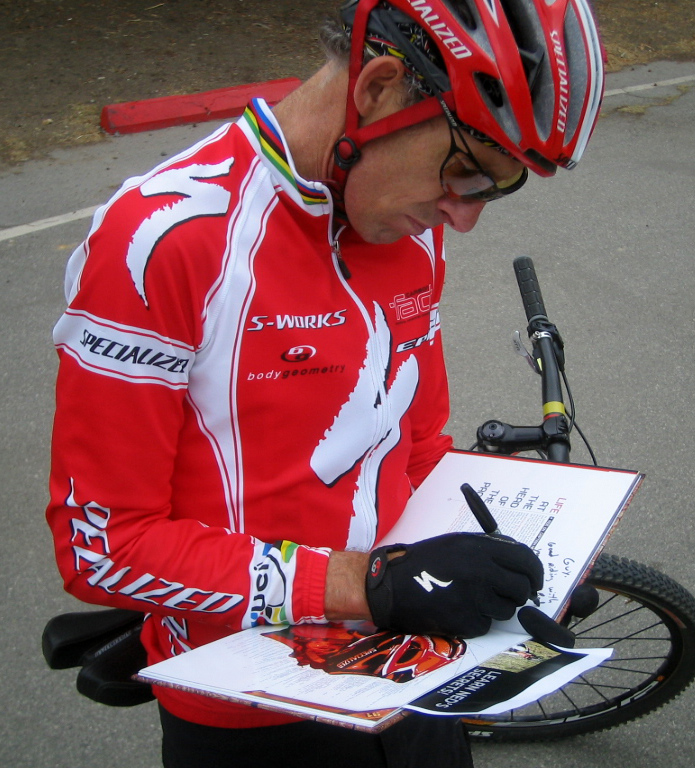
- Ned Overend signs an autograph at a Specialized demo event, October 2006

Personal information
- Full name: Edmund Overend
- Born: August 20, 1955 (age 71) Taipei, Taiwan

Cycling career
- Sport: Cycling
- Current team: Retired
- Disciplines: Mountain bike Road
- Role: Rider
Medal record
Men's mountain bike racing
World Championships
Gold medal – first place	1990 Durango	Cross-country
Bronze medal – third place	1991 Ciocco	Cross-country

Edmund Overend (born August 20, 1955) is an American former professional cross-country mountain bike racer. He is a six-time NORBA cross-country mountain bike national champion who became the first-ever cross-country world champion by winning the inaugural UCI Mountain Bike World Championship in 1990. Overend was inducted into the Mountain Bike Hall of Fame in 1990 and into the United States Bicycling Hall of Fame in 2001.

== Cycling career ==
The son of an American diplomat, Overend was born in Taipei, Taiwan and raised in Ethiopia and Iran. He attended high school in San Diego, California and was involved in motocross racing. Overend moved to Durango, Colorado in the early 1980s where he first became involved in cycling by entering Durango’s Iron Horse Classic, a 47-mile road race with 6,700 feet of climbing along a narrow gauge railroad. From road racing, he eventually moved on to mountain bike racing, where his previous motocross experience combined with his physical fitness from road racing made him an exceptional competitor.

Overend was hired to race for the Schwinn factory racing team in 1984 and won two consecutive NORBA Mountain Biking National Championships for the team in 1986 and 1987. He then signed a contract to race for Specialized Bicycles and went on to win the NORBA Mountain Biking National Championship in 1989, 1990, 1991 and 1992. At the age of 40, Overend made an attempt to qualify for the United States Olympic team to compete in the inaugural Olympic Cross-Country Mountain Biking competition in the 1996 Olympic Games in Atlanta, Georgia. He needed to finish the qualifier race in fourth place to qualify for the Olympic team alongside Tinker Juarez but, one and a half miles from the finish line, he suffered a flat tire and finished in eighth place.

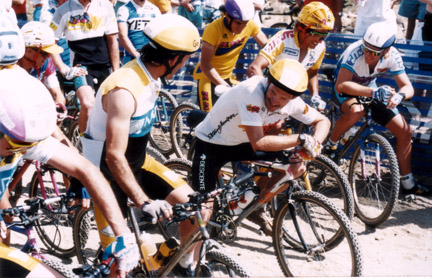
Ned Overend, John Tomac and Tinker Juarez Compete in the Cindy Whitehead Desert Classic, Palm Springs, California, 1989

Even though he retired from professional mountain bike competition in 1996, he continued competing in endurance competitions, winning the XTERRA Triathlon in 1998 and 1999 and competing in regular road triathlons. He won the U.S. National Winter Triathlon Championship in 2000 and the UCI Masters Cyclo-cross World Championship in 2012. In 2015, Overend won the first-ever U.S. Fat Bike championship. During his professional mountain biking career, Overend earned the nicknames "Deadly Nedly" and "The Lung", because he was very difficult to beat and for his exceptional aerobic endurance at altitude (especially so for a man of his age), respectively. He is the current captain of the Specialized Cross Country Team.

Overend appeared in "the world's first mountain biking video, aptly named, The Great Mountain Biking Video released in 1988 by New & Unique Videos of San Diego, California. Overend also appears in competition sequences of "The Sun Valley Mountain Bike Challenge," a video chronicle of that year's NORBA Championships also released in 1988.

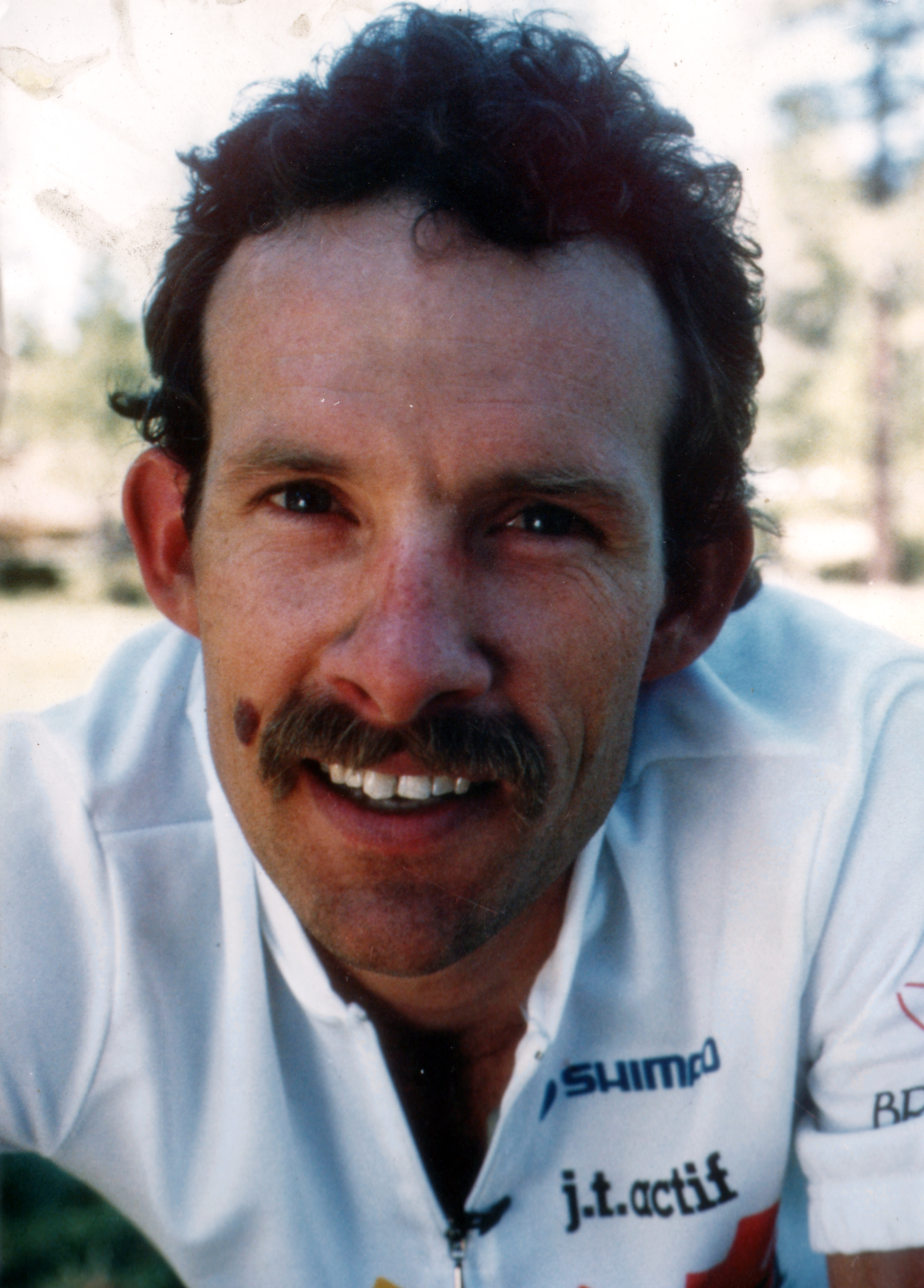
Ned Overend Appears in "The Great Mountain Biking Video," Big Bear Lakes, California, 1987

He also appeared in a mountain-bike race video entitled "Battle At Durango: The First-Ever World Mountain Biking Championships" videotaped in Durango, Colorado in 1990, and released by New & Unique Videos in 1991.

== Major achievements ==
Incomplete list

- UCI World Mountain Biking Champion (Gold, 1990; Bronze 1991)
- NORBA National Mountain Biking Champion (1986, 1987, 1989, 1990, 1991, 1992)
- NORBA National Point Series Champion (1987)
- XTERRA World Champion (1998, 1999, 2nd 1997)
- United States National Winter Triathlon Champion (2000)
- United States National XTERRA Series Champion (2001, 2002)
- UCI Masters Cyclocross World Champion [Men 55-59] (2012)
- Colorado Road Champion (2004)
- Road Apple Rally Champion (2004, 2009)
- Bob Cook Memorial Mount Evans Hill Climb (1st, 1985–1986; 2nd, 2006; 4th, 2005; 5th, 2008; 2nd, 2010)
- Mount Washington Auto Road Bicycle Hillclimb (1st 2011; 2nd, 2006, 2009)
- Teva Mountain Games Hillclimb (1st, 2007)
- USA National Fat Bike Champion 2015
