= Clint Miller =

American BMX racer

Personal information
- Full name: Clint Miller
- Nicknames: "Miller Time", "Killer"
- Born: April 29, 1962 (age 64) Pomona, California, U.S.
- Height: 1.68 m (5 ft 6 in)
- Weight: 70.3 kg (155 lb)

Cycling career
- Sport: Cycling
- Current team: Retired
- Discipline: Bicycle Motocross (BMX)
- Role: Racer
- Rider type: Off Road

Amateur teams
- 1976–1978: JMC Racing Equipment
- 1995: DirtWerx

Professional teams
- 1978: JMC Racing Equipment
- 1978: D.G. Performance Specialties
- 1978–1979: GJS So. Cal
- 1979–1982: Torker BMX Racing Products
- 1983–1984: Kuwahara Cycles, Ltd.
- 1984: Cycle Pro/GHP
- 1985–1986: CW Racing

Clint Miller 1 (born April 29, 1962, in Pomona, California, U.S.) is a former American "Old School" professional Bicycle Motocross (BMX) racer whose prime competitive years were from 1976 to 1984. A popular nickname given to him was "Miller Time", particular after a win. "Miller Time" was a play on his name that happened to invoke a popular 1970's advertising campaign slogan by the makers of Miller Beer, the Miller Brewing Company to indicate to the consumer that after a hard task at work or play that it was "Miller Time", a "..time to relax.."

== Racing career milestones ==
Note: Professional first are on the national level unless otherwise indicated.

Started Racing: In early 1975 at 13 years old at the Covina Valley BMX track in Covina, California.

Sanctioning Body: Unsanctioned.

First race result: Did not make main in 12 boys class.

First win (local):

First sponsor: Jim Melton Cyclery, Mid November 1976.

First national win: In 14 Novice at the 1976 National Bicycle Association (NBA) Grand Nationals in East Irvine, California on November 28, 1976.

Turned Professional: 1978 at 15 years of age.

First Professional race result: First Place at Covina Valley in 1977. He won US$17 It was a local race.

First Professional* win: See above.

Retired from Senior pro racing: Early 1986 age 24.

Height & weight at height of his career (1983): Ht: 5'6.25" Wt:~ 155 lbs.

*At the start of his pro career, there wasn't a two tier system of Junior and Senior Pros, therefore his first pro race and/or win was his first in Senior pro.

=== Career factory and major bike shop sponsors ===
Note: This listing only denotes the racer's primary sponsors. At any given time a racer could have numerous co-sponsors. Primary sponsorships can be verified by BMX press coverage and sponsor's advertisements at the time in question. When possible exact dates are given.

==== Amateur ====
- JMC (Jim Melton Cyclery) Racing Equipment: Mid November 1976-June 1978. Clint Miller would turn professional with this sponsor.

==== Professional ====
- JMC Racing Equipment: Mid November 1976-June 1978
- D.G. Performance Specialties (The initials stood for Dan Hangsleben, Gary Harlow): June 1978-December 1978
- GJS So. Cal (The initials stood for George Jeff and Scott Utterback): December 1978-December 1979. The initials were for the first name of the Jeff Utterback's father, Jeff Utterback the famous racer himself, and his younger brother.
- Torker BMX Racing Products: Late December 1979-December 1982
- Kuwahara Cycles, Ltd.: January 1983-September 1984. Clint left Kuwahara after it disbanded its BMX team effort due to financial difficulties. "Kuwahara" is Japanese for Mulberry Meadows. The company is named after Sentaro Kuwahara who founded the company in 1916 in Osaka, Japan.
- Cycle Pro/GHP (Greg Hill Products): September 1984-December 1984. With CyclePro discontinuing its relationship with GHP (during its first incarnation) Clint Miller was dropped from the team for financial reasons. Clint quietly retired from BMX competition after April 1985 but came back after receiving an offer from CW Racing.
- CW (Custom Works) Racing: October 1985-Early 1986 After leaving GHP he had actually quietly retired after April 1985 (after the NBL national in Gardena, California), never intending to race again. Then he got the call from CW Racing. They were looking for a pro to replace the departing Pete Loncarevich who was leaving CW for Haro Designs in April 1986. He was retired for six months after being dropped by GHP and by the time CW called. However, his comeback did not last long and he retired permanently in early 1986.

==== Amateur ====
- DirtWerx: 1995. He had himself reclassified an amateur after a 10-year absence from BMX. As late as mid-1997 he was racing in the 35-39 cruiser class of the NBL, racing the NBL Bear Nationals on May 10, 1997.

=== Career bicycle motocross titles ===
Note: Listed are District, State/Provincial/Department, Regional, National, and International titles in italics. "Defunct" refers to the fact of that sanctioning body in question no longer existing at the start of the racer's career or at that stage of his/her career. Depending on point totals of individual racers, winners of Grand Nationals do not necessarily win National titles. Series and one off Championships are also listed in block.

==== Amateur ====
National Bicycle Association (NBA)

- 1976 14 Novice Grandnational Champion

National Bicycle League (NBL)

- None

American Bicycle Association (ABA)

- None

International Bicycle Motocross Federation (IBMXF)

- None

==== Professional ====
National Bicycle Association (NBA)

- None

National Bicycle League (NBL)

- 1980 Pro Money and Pro Trophy Third Place Jag World Champion

American Bicycle Association (ABA)

- None

United States Bicycle Motocross Association (USBA)

- 1984 Pro Cruiser National No.3

International Bicycle Motocross Federation (IBMXF)

- 1983 Pro World Champion

Pro Series Championships and Invitationals

- 1981 Anglo-American Challenge Invitational Champion (United Kingdom BMX Association (UKBMXA) and IBMXF sanctioned). This was basically an exhibition race held in Redditch, England on May 3, 1981, to celebrate the one-year anniversary of the founding of BMX in England. There was no pro class. Miller won the 16 and over amateur trophy dash to gain the title. This was the very first international race sanctioned by the IBMXF.
- 1984 Qantas BMX Titles Australian Champion

=== Notable accolades ===
- Clint Miller is a 2005 ABA BMX Hall of Fame Inductee

=== Significant injuries ===
- Broke thumb at the 1983 ABA Great Lakes National in Lapeer, Michigan during practice.

== Post BMX career ==
He still races both BMX and MX occasionally but can be found mostly racing MX as a past time.

== BMX press magazine interviews and articles ==
- "Torker Team" BMX Plus! May 1980 Vol.3 No.5 pg.20 Joint interview with Eddy & Mike King, Mike Agueilera, and Jason Jensen; his teammates on the Torker BMX racing team.
- "Clint:"Total BMX September 1981 Vol.2 No.4 pg.14
- "Clint Miller" Bicycle Motocross Action September 1981 Vol.6 No.9 pg.39 Short sidebar article concerning his Cruiser.
- "Clint Miller BMX Plus! June 1982 Vol.5 No.5 pg.29
- "Clint Miller's Training Program" June 1983 Vol.8 No.6 pg.23 Miller discuss his exercise, training and diet program.
- "Training Your Brain with Hypnosis" BMX Action April 1984 Vol.9 No.4 pg.58 Article about self hypnosis to better focus the mind psychologically for racing Clint Miller contributed to.
- "BMXer On The Go" Super BMX June 1984 Vol.11 No.6 pg.24
- "Five Minutes with Clint" BMX Action September 1984 Vol.9 No.9 pg.31
- "Interview: The Businessmen" BMX Action April 1985 Vol.10 No.4 pg.53 Joint interview with Greg Hill.
- "Clint's Back!"Super BMX & Freestyle January 1986 Vol.13 No.1 pg.49

== BMX magazine covers ==
Bicycle Motocross News:

- None

Minicycle/BMX Action & Super BMX:

- January 1986 Vol.13 No.1 In insert freestyler Tony Murry. (SBMX)
- On the cover of the Super BMX 1983 BMX World Championship Special Edition

Bicycle Motocross Action & Go:

- January/February 1979 Vol.4 No.1 (BMXA)
- May 1982 Vol.7 No.5 behind Scott Clark, Harry Leary and ahead of Denny Davidow, Greg Grubbs and Tinker Juarez. (BMXA)
- June 1982 Vol.7 No.6 with Brent Patterson. (BMXA)
- February 1983 Vol.8 No.2 (BMXA)
- August 1983 Vol.8 No.8 with Harry Leary in first place and behind Brian Patterson. (BMXA)
- "BMX World Championship Special Edition" Winter 1983 Special edition published by Super BMX reporting in detail the IBMXF BMX World Championships. In the centerfold he is posing with fellow racer Ron House and child actress Heather O'Rourke.

BMX Plus!:

- December 1979 Vol.2 No.11* (103X) ahead of Stu Thomsen in second place (far right) and ahead of an obscured Jeff Kosmola who was in third place behind Thomsen. Jeff Bottema is in fourth place to the far left.
- May 1982 Vol.5 No.5
- September 1983 Vol.6 No.8** behind Stu Thomsen & Brent Patterson.
- March 1984 Vol.7 No.3 with Brian Patterson.
- August 1984 Vol.7 No.8 in inset. In separate insets Toby Henderson, Mike Miranda and freestyler Woody Itson.

* The publisher skipped a month in 1979
**Due to a change of ownership BMX Plus! did not publish a May 1983 issue.
Total BMX:

Bicycles and Dirt:

- January 1984 Vol.2 No.4 Just inside of the frame on the left. Pete Loncarevich (A) is the subject of the image. An unidentified racer is behind Loncarevich.

BMX Biker Monthly (British publication):

- 1983 Issue No.1

BMX Action Bike (British publication):

- October 1983 Vol.1 Iss.12

NBA World & NBmxA World (The official NBA/NBmxA membership publication):

Bicycles Today & BMX Today (The official NBL membership publication under two names):

ABA Action, American BMXer, BMXer (The official ABA membership publication. Three different names over the years, same publication):

- January/February 1984 Vol.7 No.1

USBA Racer (The official USBA membership publication):
