= Body camera =

Video camera worn on the body

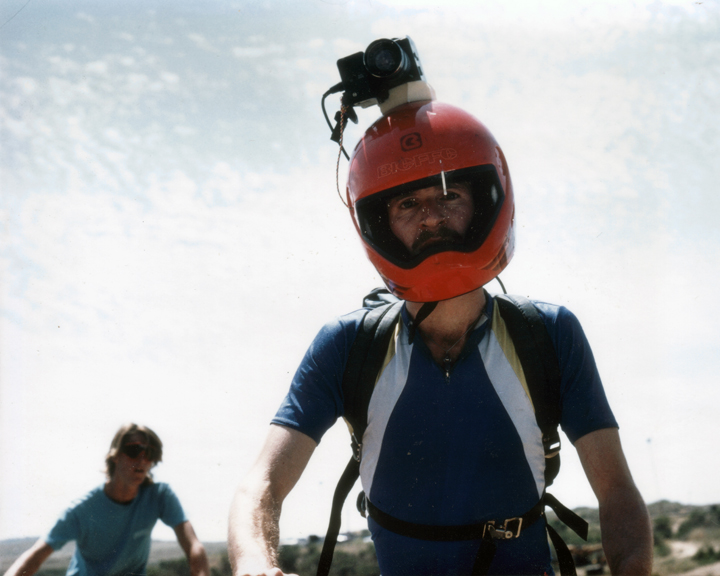
Biker wearing one of the first 'helmet cams' c. 1987

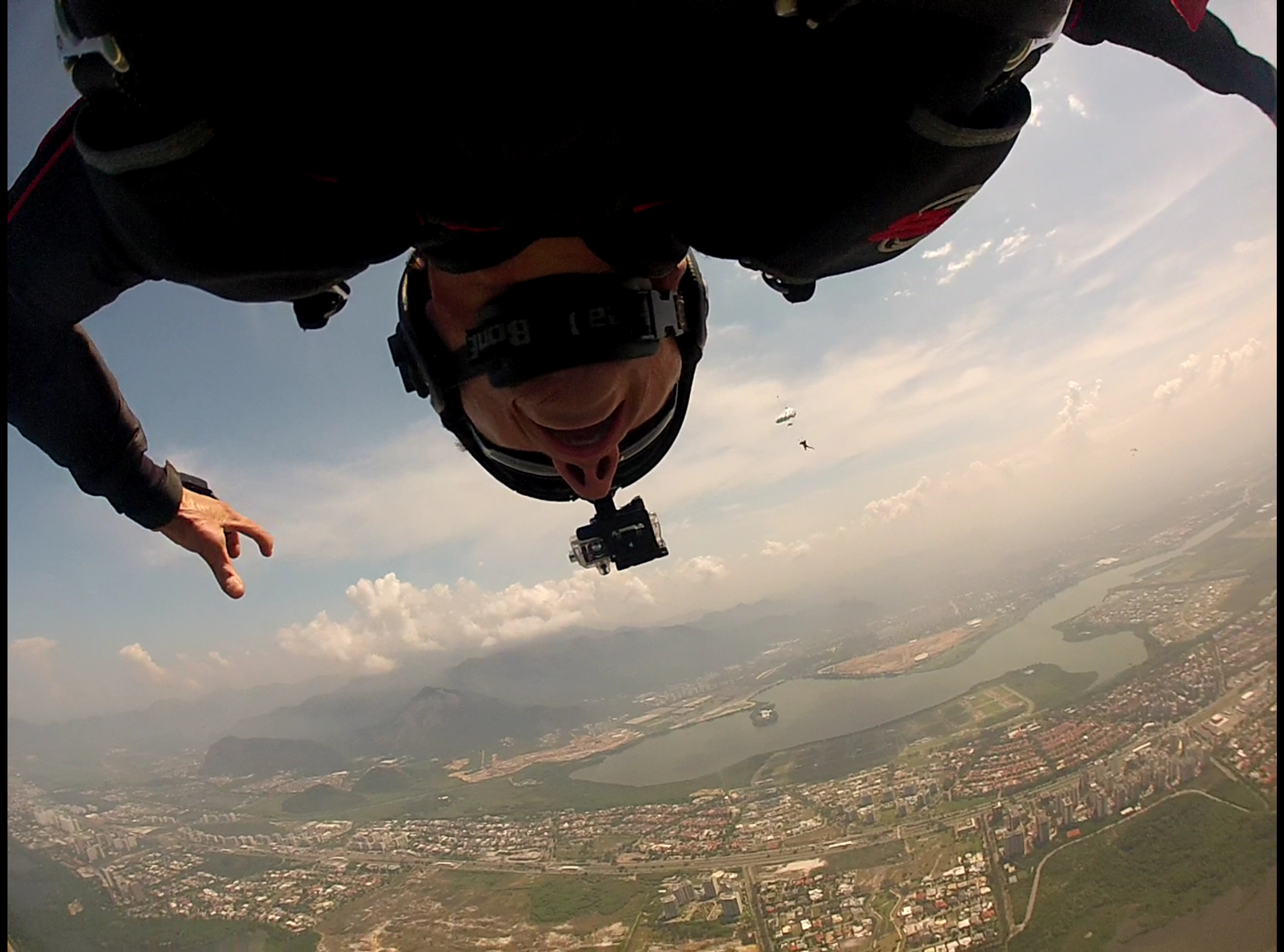
Skydiver with helmet camera

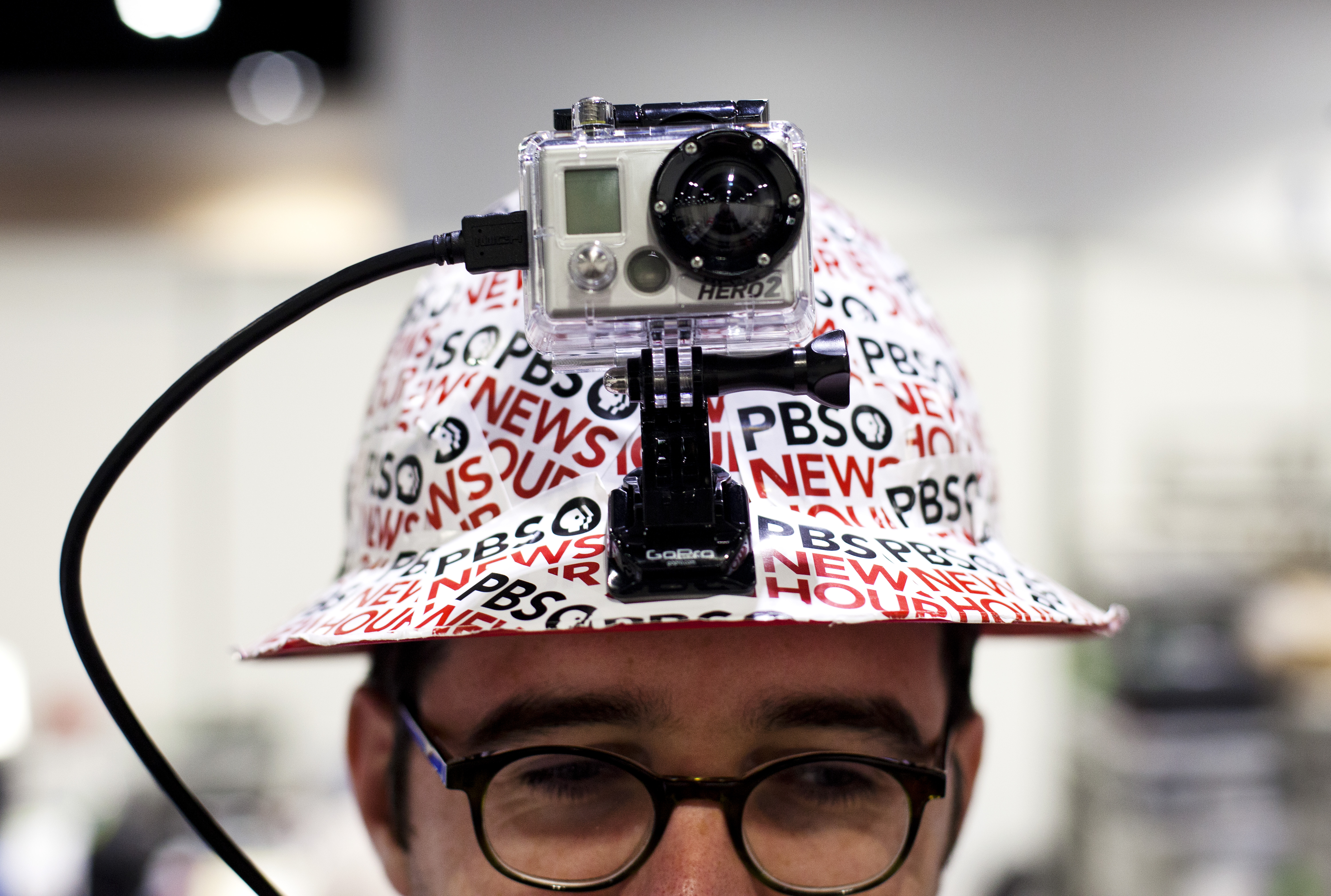
Reporter with a GoPro camera on helmet to live stream press conferences

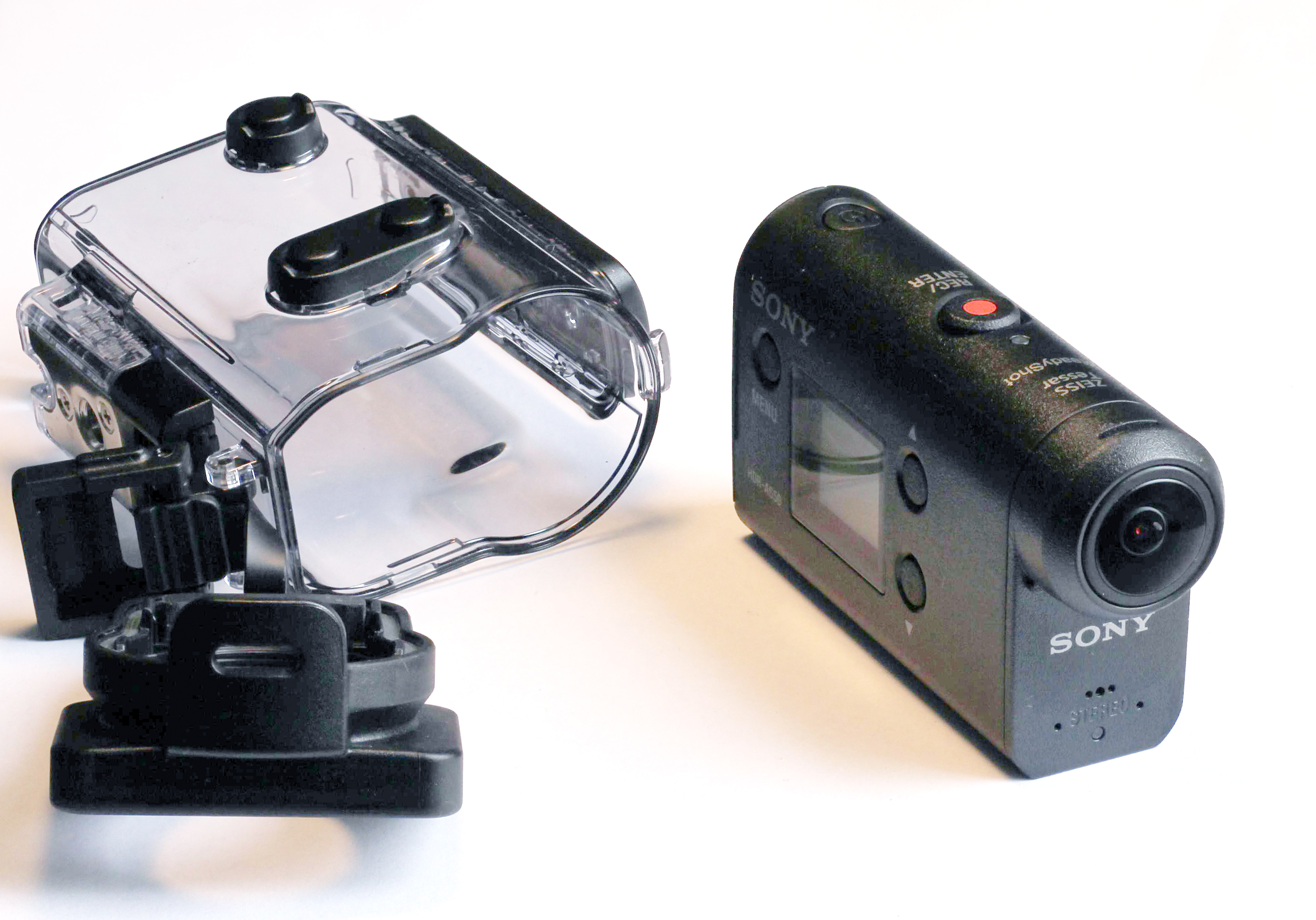
Action-Cam with underwater housing

A body camera, bodycam, body-worn video (BWV), body-worn camera, or wearable camera is a wearable audio, video, or photographic recording system.

Body cameras have a range of uses and designs, of which the best-known use is as a police body camera. Other uses include action cameras for social and recreational (including cycling), within the world of commerce, in healthcare and medical use, in military use, journalism, citizen sousveillance, and covert surveillance. Action cameras are therefore typically compact, rugged, and waterproof at the surface level. They typically use CMOS image sensors, and can take photos in burst mode and time-lapse mode as well as record high-definition video (as of 2019, mid-range to high-end action cameras can record 4K video at 60 fps). Slow-motion video recording at 120 or 240 fps is also a common feature.

Research on the impact of body-worn cameras for law enforcement shows mixed evidence as to their impact on the use of force by law enforcement and communities' trust in police. The publicized deaths of black Americans at the hands of police has been a large factor increasing support for body worn cameras by police personnel. For decades people have protested police by watching them stemming from long term unhappiness with the system, and social media has only bolstered this behavior from the public.

== Designs ==
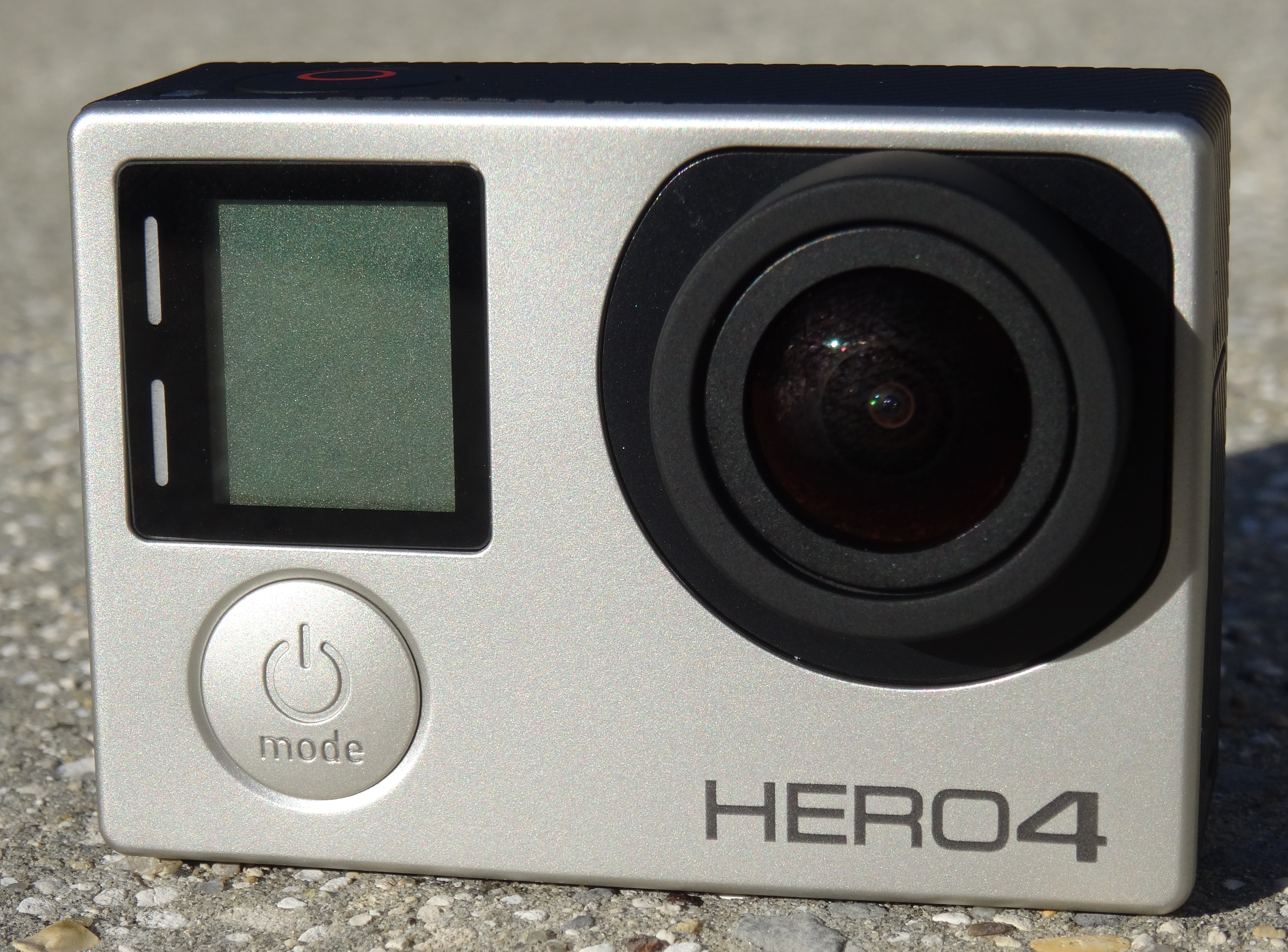
GoPro Hero 4 Silver Edition, one of the most recognizable action cameras

Body-worn cameras are often designed to be worn in one of three locations: on the torso, on or built into a helmet, and on or built into glasses. Some feature live streaming capabilities, such as GPS positioning, automatic offload to cloud storage, while others are based on local storage. Some body-worn cameras offer automatic activation of the cameras with the ability to adhere to that agency's specific body camera recording policies. The National Criminal Justice Technology Research, Test, and Evaluation Center has conducted market surveys on body-worn cameras to assist organizations in purchasing the best camera. The survey discusses device functionality, optics, audio, GPS, and several more categories. These cameras range in price from 200 dollars to 2,000 dollars.

== Applications ==
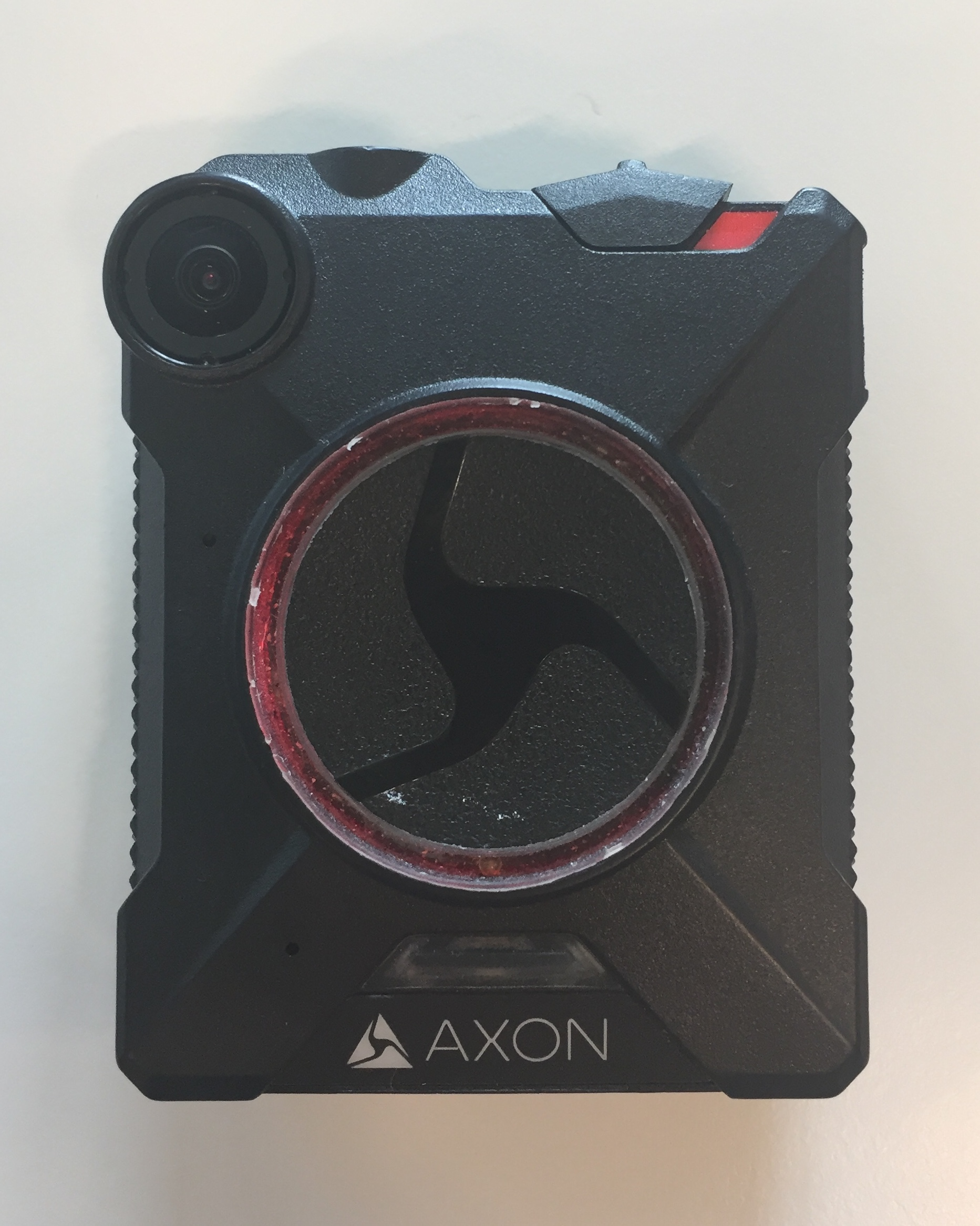
A close up of a body camera not on a body

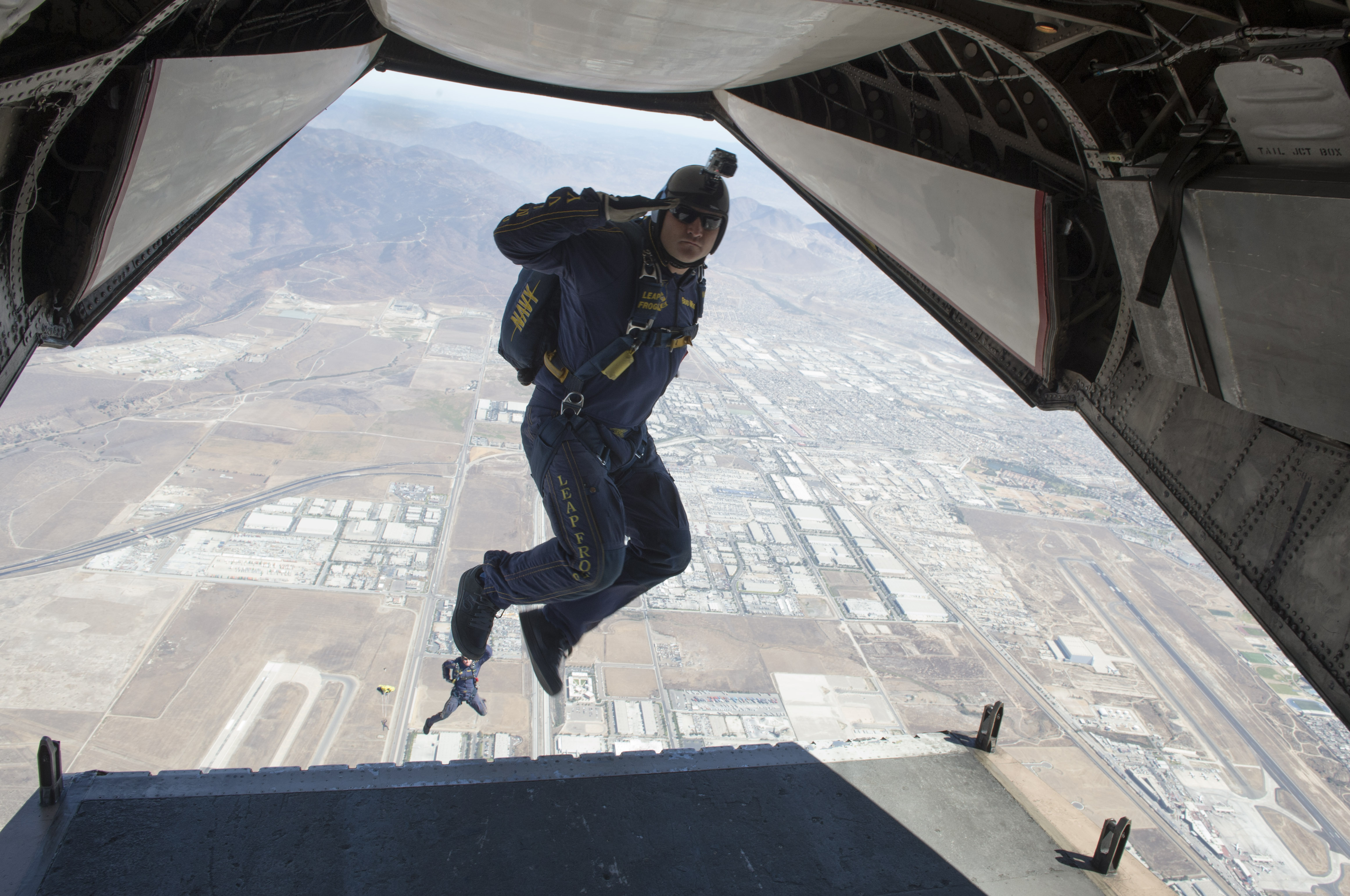
Navy parachute demonstration team member wearing a helmet cam on a jump

The camera is typically worn or mounted in such a way that it can shoot from the point of view of the shooter. Some examples of common places to mount an action camera are on a hat or helmet, on the chest, or on the handlebars of a bike or similar vehicle. They may also be mounted on a tripod or on a monopod for handheld use. An action camera is usually designed to require minimal interaction once recording has begun, as this allows continuous capture of the action without having to interact with the camera. A typical action camera records onto a microSD card, and has either a Micro-USB or a USB-C connector.

Action cameras are associated with outdoor sports, and, often attached to helmets, surfboards or handlebars, are an integral part of many extreme sports such as base jumping and wingsuit flying. Sometimes several cameras are used to capture specific perspectives, such as a helmet camera that sees the perspective of the actor in combination with a second camera attached to the environment of the rider, such as a board, wing, handlebar or wrist, that looks back onto the rider and records their reactions.

The category is commonly associated with the GoPro range of cameras, and many action cameras come with a GoPro mount adapter to take advantage of the accessories available for these cameras. However, there are many GoPro alternatives which are entering the market of action cameras in recent times.

=== Law enforcement ===
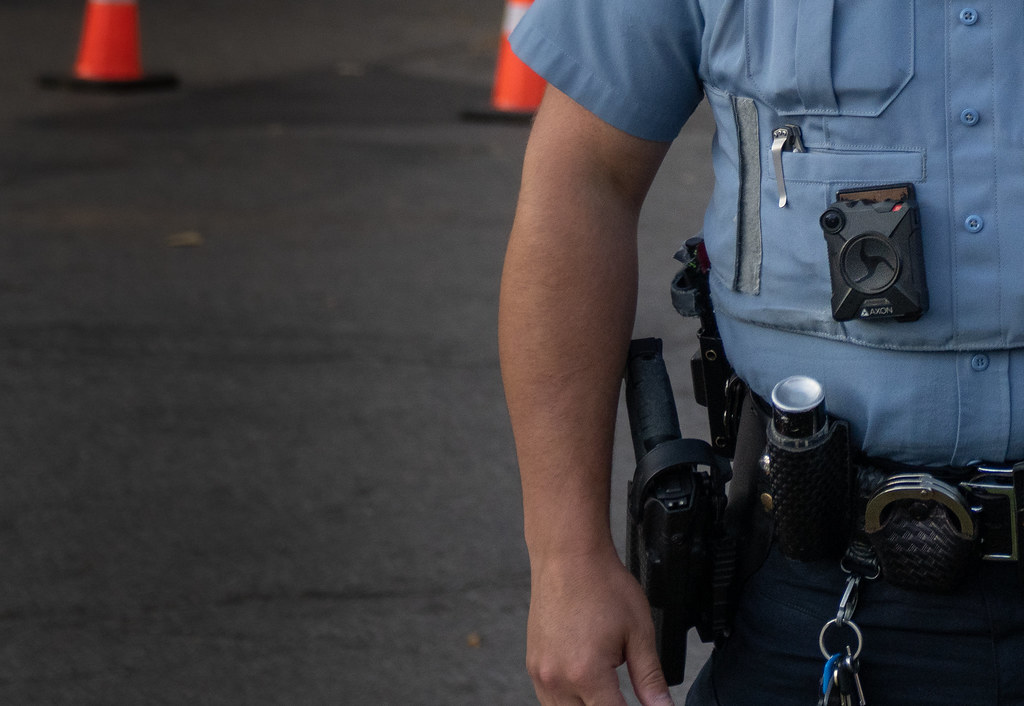
Police body camera example

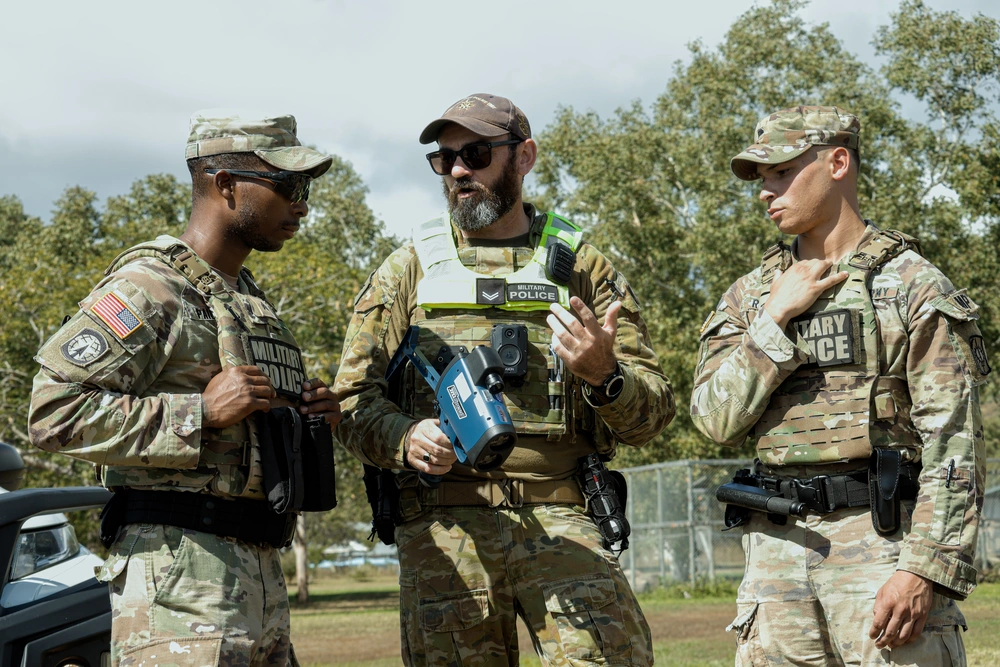
Australian Defence Force MP wearing Axon Body 3

Wearable cameras are used by police and other law enforcement organizations in countries around the world. The cameras are intended to improve interactions between officers and the public. The first generation of 'modern' police body cameras was introduced around 2005 in the United Kingdom, followed from 2014 onwards by large-scale implementation in the United States, mainly to increase transparency and police accountability. Following multiple cases of civil unrest surrounding the deaths of civilians under police supervision, a growing current of demands for a more thorough investigation process began to swell. Groups like Black Lives Matter were protesting and calling for action from the Obama administration. On December 18, 2014, the Obama administration cited "simmering distrust" between police and minorities as a reason to enact the president's task force on 21st-century policing as an executive order. There are more than 1800 police departments in the United States, and by 2016 more than half of them were using BWC technology in some capacity. Early studies showed positive results, but replications have led to mixed findings. Outcomes have been shown to differ depending on the local context and the guidelines regulating activation of the body cams. The most obvious effect of this technology would be increased transparency between the police force and the public, as the technology makes it much easier to collect evidence of misconduct whether that be on the part of the officer or the civilian. Challenges include training, privacy, storage and the use of recordings further 'downstream' in the judicial system. The presence of body-worn cameras influences both parties present for an arrest, but the exact effects are currently inconclusive. However, the presence of body-worn gives ease to the public which can improve relations between police and the public. Conclusive studies have not yet reached an explanation as to the concrete effects on the individuals, but it can be noted that the presence of body worn cameras has resulted in a decrease in civilian complaints. Challenges include training, privacy, storage and the use of recordings further 'downstream' in the judicial system. A systematic review assessed the available evidence on the effect of body-worn cameras in law enforcement on police and citizen behavior. They found that body-worn cameras may not substantially impact officer or citizen behavior and that effects on use of force and arrest activities are inconsistent and non-significant. Research suggests no clear effects of body-worn cameras in terms of citizen behavior such as calls to police and resisting arrest. Subsequent analysis of the research affirms these mixed findings and draws attention to how the design of many evaluations fails to account for local context or citizen perspectives.

Body-worn cameras have become one of the biggest costs for townships, cities, and agencies for police, costing millions of dollars. The main reason for the growth of body-worn cameras is a direct result of the publicizing of events over the past decade, where Caucasian police officers have killed unarmed Black civilians. The family of Michael Brown, a black teenager killed by police, called for the use of BWCs by all police in the United States. The task force assembled by the Obama administration recommended the use of BWCs on the local level in 2015; this was backed up by the Department of Justice.

The main place where body-worn cameras have become more popular is in low-researched environments, because public protest was the main driving reason for BWC becoming so widespread.

The use of body-worn cameras by police was not only a popular development in the United States, but also in England and Wales, where they are not a new discovery. The overall outcome and reactions to these cameras have been positive, but there has been little evidence on how BWCs have affected the actions and reactions of the police wearing them.

=== Firefighting ===
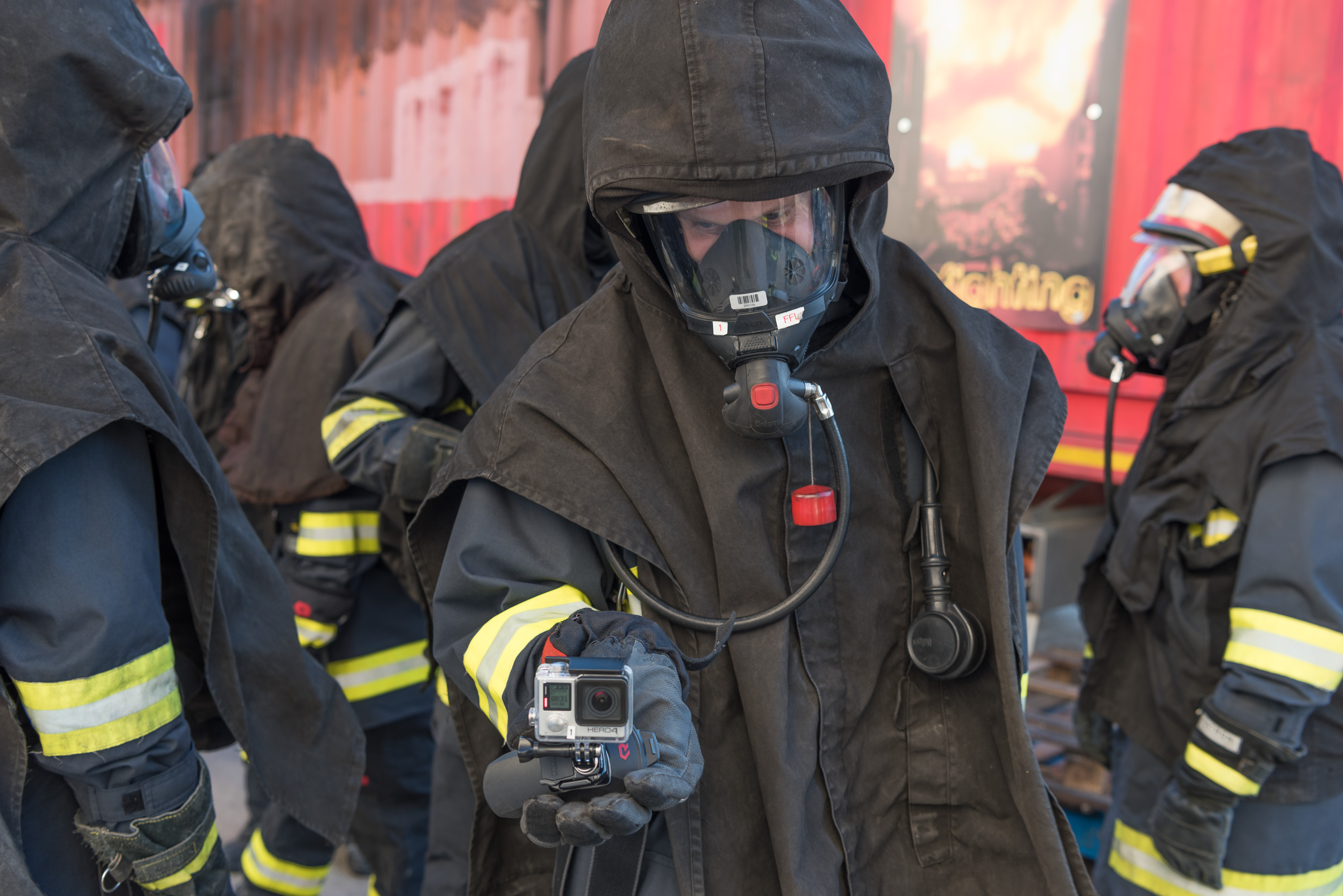
Firefighter with a GoPro camera

Firefighters use helmet cameras as a tool to assess fires and for communication and training purposes. Cameras in this occupation are often thermal cameras in order to be able to see in darkness and inside smoke-filled buildings. Augmented reality (AR) can be added to accentuate outlines of objects and people.

=== Healthcare ===
Body worn video has been suggested and explored in the medical field. Data recorded from wearable cameras can assist in medical research and limit error caused by inaccurate self-reporting of data. It is speculated that under-reporting is common when conducting dietary and nutrition assessments. Research suggests body worn video reduces under-reporting of intake during such assessments. Cameras can be used as a memory prosthetic for conditions that affect the memory. In 2013, Google Glass was used to assist in surgery by providing a mostly hands-free way to broadcast and receive consultation from another surgeon. Body cameras were provided to hospital staff by the Cardiff and Vale Health Board in Wales, United Kingdom. The cameras were issued to reduce the likelihood of violent assaults against staff. According to the manager who provides support to staff who have been attacked, the cameras – and especially the audio recording – have been vital for successful prosecutions.

Body cameras can be used to make an impact in the mental health world. There is currently only minimal evidence on the effects that body cameras have in a mental health setting in reference to violence within patients; the use of the technology points towards lower numbers of complaints from the public in law enforcement, though its efficacy in mental health settings is not clear.

=== Military combat ===
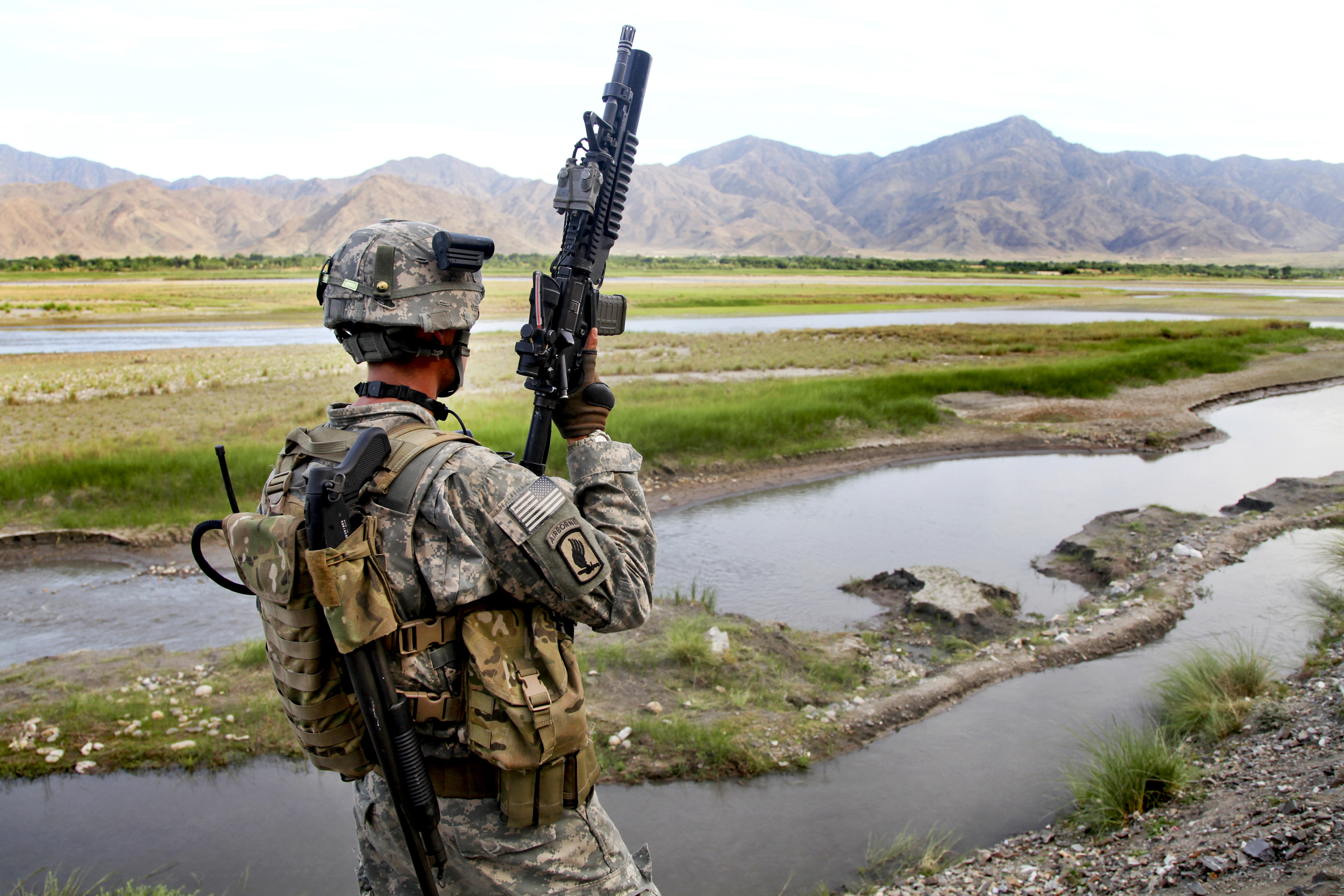
U.S. soldier in Afghanistan with a personal helmet camera, 2010

Body-worn cameras as well as helmet cameras are used in the military. Video can either be stored locally, or streamed back to a command center or military outpost. A notable example is the raid on Osama Bin Laden's compound, where live video footage of the raid is believed to have been streamed to the White House. In 2013, Royal Marine Alexander Blackman was convicted of murder for killing a captive Taliban insurgent; footage from the incident, recorded on a helmet camera, was used in Blackman's court-martial. The conviction was overturned in 2017 and reduced to manslaughter on the grounds of diminished responsibility, with Blackman being released from jail. The helmet camera has been the focus of the Discovery Channel series Taking Fire about the 101st Airborne in the Korengal documenting their personal war footage.

=== Militancy ===
The utilization of body cameras by militant groups represents a shift in the tactics of modern conflict and asymmetrical warfare, enabling such groups to amplify the impact of their operations. It can serve as a propaganda tool, a means of recruitment, and a method to maintain the narrative surrounding their actions.

In 2016, helmet camera footage was recovered from a dead Islamic State fighter in Iraq, offering a contrasting picture of chaos and panic in a battle with Kurdish Peshmerga. There have also been various other helmet camera footage that were recovered from Islamic State fighters.

On October 7, 2023, Hamas and other Gazan militants used bodycams and helmet cameras during an attack on Israeli communities bordering the Gaza Strip. The videos released on social media, or captured by Israeli forces from the bodies of dead or captured militants, depicted severe acts of violence including murder, torture, decapitation, and kidnapping.

=== Retail ===
Body cameras may be worn by retail workers to deter against abusive or threatening behavior by customers.

Retailers are looking for ways to solve issues when it comes to dealing with criminal behavior, while also making the staff feel safer and more comfortable when working.

== Privacy concerns ==
Concerns over privacy have been raised over the use of this technology, most notably in the context of Google Glasses and policing. The advent of large-scale data collection, possibly in combination with facial recognition and other technologies capable of interpreting videos in bulk, means that all cameras, including body-worn cameras, could create a means of tracking people anywhere they go. In policing, critics have warned that each police officer could become a "roving surveillance camera". Issues involving privacy concerns continue as new technologies are presented to law enforcement but the government has had ways of masking the technologies from the public and in some cases, even the police. Police will interact with citizens during vulnerable moments, such as in a hospital, or in a domestic violence situation. Concerns have also been raised that these algorithms not only infringe on privacy rights, but could also be ethnically biased. The American Civil Liberties Union has suggested policies to balance citizen's rights with the desire for more transparency and accountability.

== History ==
In 2014, worldwide action camera sales increased by 44 percent from the previous year and half of them have the capability to shoot Ultra High Definition at 4K resolution. Action camera sales have surpassed traditional camcorder and compact camera sales, and it is predicted that in 2019, action camera sales will surpass all types of cameras due to the sales of other camera types declining or stabilizing.

By 2021, the Ultra HD category of the action camera market is expected to reach $3.3 billion. The Full HD category, meanwhile, is expected to reach $2.2 billion, with the surveillance/security industry driving growth.

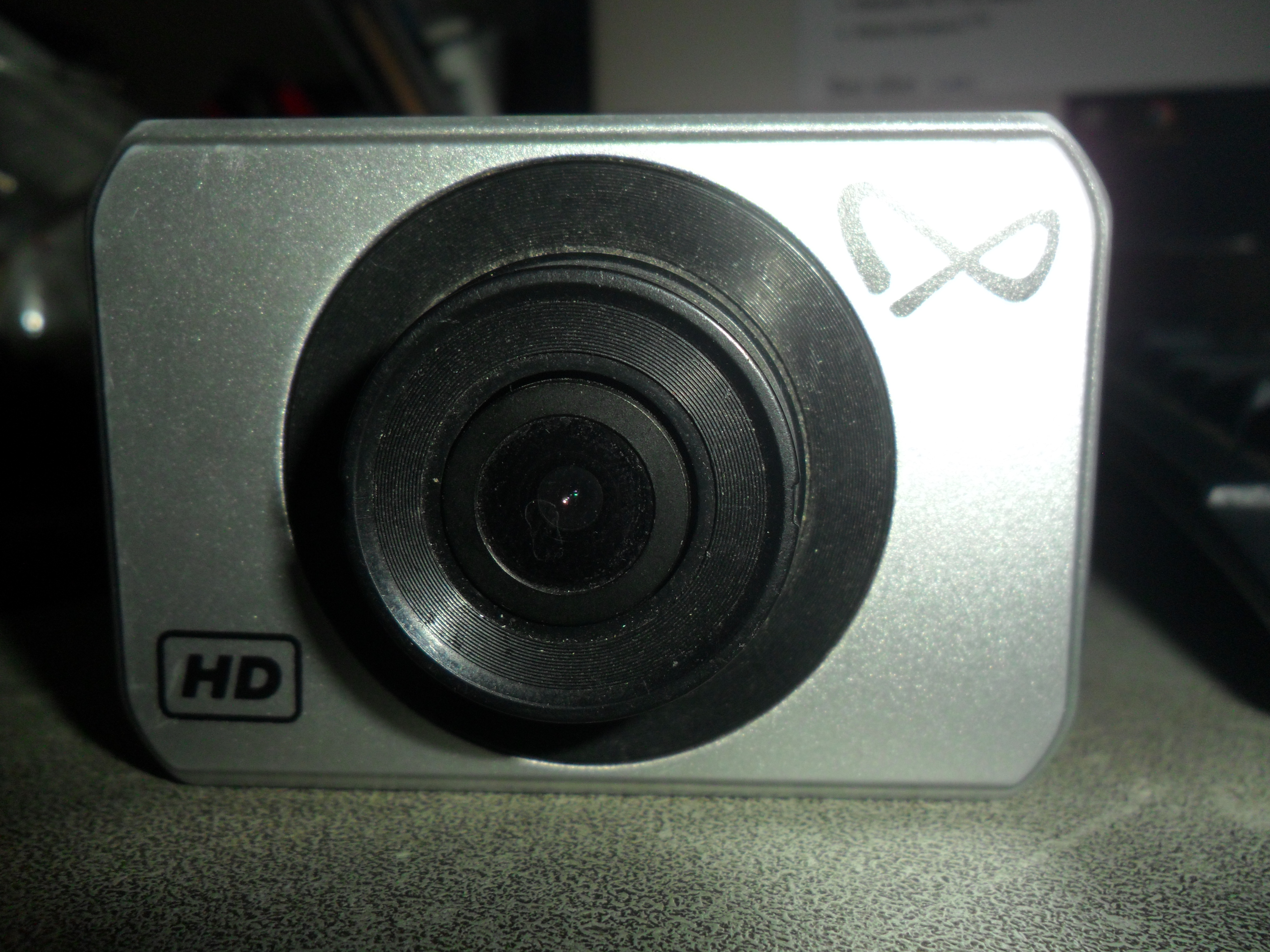
8ten action camera, low budget HD camera

In 2018, Sony launched a shock and waterproof camera with a 1" sensor in a body size similar to an action camera. However, Sony is not marketing it as an action camera; rather, as a video professional camera with the capability to shoot with up to 15 cameras at the same time.

== Product lines ==
Besides the GoPro line, other models of action cams include the:

- Sony HDR-AS10, HDR-AS15 and HDR-AS30V
- Garmin VIRB
- Panasonic HX-A500E
- Toshiba Camileo X-Sports
- Polaroid Cube
- TomTom Bandit
- Minox ACX
- Xiaomi YiCamera
- Ricoh WG-M1
- Insta360
- DJI Osmo Action

== See also ==
- 360 camera
- Dashcam
- Helmet camera
- Pocket video camera
- Refcam
- Rugged compact digital camera
- Shooting of Jamarion Robinson
- Sousveillance
- Subminiature photography
- Underwater photography
- Webcam
