= Jeff Bottema =

American bicycle motocross rider (1960–2025)

Personal information
- Full name: Jeffery Bottema
- Nickname: "Battling"
- Born: April 14, 1960 Norwalk, California, U.S.
- Died: September 19, 2025 (aged 65)
- Height: 5 ft 11 in (1.80 m)
- Weight: 162 lb (73 kg)

Cycling career
- Sport: Cycling
- Discipline: Bicycle Motocross (BMX)
- Role: Racer/Manufacturer/Team Manager
- Rider type: Off Road

Amateur teams
- 1974–1975: Two Wheeler's BMX
- 1975–1976: Webco Inc.
- 1976–1977: D.G. Performance Specialist

Professional teams
- 1977–1979: D.G. Performance Specialist
- 1979–1981: Raleigh Cycle Company
- 1981: Mountain Dew
- 1981–1983: Murray of Ohio Corporation

Jeffery Bottema (April 14, 1960 – September 19, 2025) was an American professional "Old School" Bicycle Motocross (BMX) racer whose prime competitive years were from 1976 to 1981. He had the nickname of "Battling". Bottema died on September 19, 2025, at the age of 65.

== Racing career milestones ==
Note: In the early days of professional racing, 1977 and prior, many tracks offered small purse prize money to the older racers of an event, even before the official sanctioning bodies offered prize money in formal divisions themselves. Hence some early "professionals" like Stu Thomsen turning "pro" in 1975 at 16 years old where racing for small amounts of money at track events when offered even before the NBA, regarded as the first true national BMX sanctioning body, had a professional division. For the sake of consistency and standardization noted professional first are for the first pro races for prize money offered by official BMX sanctioning bodies and not independent track events. Professional firsts are also on the national level unless otherwise indicated.

Started racing: Mid 1974 at 14 years old. His father brought him a monoshock BMX bicycle and he tried out racing.

Sanctioning body:

First race result:

First win (local):

Sanctioning body district(s): National Bicycle Association (NBA) District "X" (Southern California/Los Angeles) 1973–1981.

First sponsor: Two Wheeler's BMX 1974.

First national win: In 14-17 Novice Class at the National Pedal Sport Association (NPSA) Eastern Nationals in Atlanta on September 7, 1975.

Turned Professional:

First Professional race* result:

First Professional* win:

Retired: At the end of the 1983 season. During the last two years of his career he mostly raced 24" Cruiser Class.

Height & weight at height of his career: (1983) Ht:5'11 Wt:165 lbs.

*At the time there was no separate pro class for pros due to the relatively small number of pros. They raced with the 16 Experts, making it a Pro/Am class essentially. This is why during the early years of the pro division the national number one racer of a sanctioning body could be either an amateur or professional. This practice continued until the NBA's 1979 season in which the pros earned separate pro points and a separate pro plate from the amateurs. The ABA and the NBL followed suit a year later.

=== Career factory and major bike shop sponsors ===
Note: This listing only denotes the racer's primary sponsors. At any given time a racer could have numerous ever-changing co-sponsors. Primary sponsorships can be verified by BMX press coverage and sponsor company advertisements at the time in question. When possible exact dates are given.

==== Amateur ====
- Two Wheeler's BMX: 1974 – May 1975
- Webco Inc.: May 1975 – March 1976. Webco disbanded its team in March 1976.
- D.G. Performance Specialist (The initials stood for Dan Hangsleben, Gary Harlow): Late April 1976-July 1979. In April 1977 Bottema supposedly briefly "retired" to race motorcycle motocross (MX) for D.G., much like how David Clinton briefly "retired" from BMX to race MX in early 1976 for his then sponsor Kawasaki Motors. However, Bottema totally retiring from BMX was an incorrect announcement. He concentrated on MX while racing some BMX. Bottema started racing BMX full-time again in early 1978.

==== Professional ====
- D.G. Performance Specialist: Late April 1976 – July 1979.
- Raleigh Cycle Company of America: July 1979 – Mid January 1981. Raleigh dropped its racing team in January 1981. According to teammate Toby Henderson Raleigh allegedly strung himself and Jeff Bottema along with false promises of a new contract for the 1982 season only to abruptly dropped by Raleigh:

Toby Henderson: "...I was getting a couple of good contracts coming up, and I turned them all down, because I kept calling Raleigh, and saying, "Well, are we going to do something next year?" "Oh yeah, oh yeah, we're really going to be full force next year." [Raleigh's alleged response-ed.] So I turned some good contracts down, and I let it all slide, until the middle of January, when I called them up and said, "Well, where's the contracts? Let's get some contracts going", and they said, Well, we decided we're going to go TV advertisement", and that's all they said, like "Click." [imitating a phone hang up-ed.] And we [Henderson and Bottema-ed.] said, "Huh?" Here we turned down like three or four good contracts in October, when all the other teams were setting their budgets up and looking for their riders for the next year." ---BMX Plus! October 1982

Ironically, Raleigh would restart its BMX sponsoring program a year later.

- Mountain Dew: Late 1980 – Mid 1981. During the early spring and summer of 1981 he was part of the Mountain Dew exhibition team that toured the US demonstrating BMX racing, freestyle and BMX safety. His teammates included Perry Kramer, Harry Leary, Stu Thomsen, Brent Patterson, Bob Haro and R. L. Osborn (this was concurrent and in addition to their primary sponsor at the time).
- Murray of Ohio Corporation: August 1981-December 1983* Jeff Bottema became road team manager as well as a racer in May 1982. Scott Clark succeeded him in that position after Bottema retired from racing.

*As an active racer. After his retirement at the end of the 1983 season he took an office position with Murray. He later became the Murray Road Racing Team Manager.

=== Career bicycle motocross titles ===
Note: Listed are District, State/Provincial/Department, Regional, National, and International titles in italics. "Defunct" refers to the fact of that sanctioning body in question no longer existing at the start of the racer's career or at that stage of his/her career. Depending on point totals of individual racers, winners of Grand Nationals do not necessarily win National titles. Series and one off Championships are also listed in block.

==== Amateur ====
National Bicycle Association (NBA)

- 1975 14 & Over Intermediate Grandnational Champion #1 (Tinker Juarez was the winner of the second Main).
- 1977 16 Expert NBA/Mongoose Exhibition winner (First race; David Clinton won the second group of 16 Experts). In 1977 the NBA held an exhibition race during the halftime period between the Philadelphia Eagles and the Los Angeles Rams NFL football game at the Los Angeles Coliseum in Los Angeles in August 1977 (the Rams moved from Los Angeles, California to St. Louis, Missouri in 1994). The racers in the mains during halftime were invited after an NBA race at Rancho San Diego on September 19, 1976 in San Diego, California

National Bicycle League (NBL)

- 1976 Class F (15 Expert) NML/Schwinn Gold Cup winner††

††In 1976 the National Motocross League (NML) (the motorcycle motocross racing parent organization of the NBL) with the sponsorship of the Schwinn Bicycle Company held the final Gold Cup mains races (after having two qualifying events several days before) as an exhibition during the halftime period in a pre-season NFL football game between the Miami Dolphins and the Minnesota Vikings in the Orange Bowl in Miami, Florida on July 31, 1976 in front of and estimated 50,000 spectators.

American Bicycle Association (ABA)

- None

Fédération Internationale Amateur de Cyclisme (FIAC)

- None

International Bicycle Motocross Federation (IBMXF)

- None

Independent race series and invitationals:

- 1975 Heavyweight* Intermediate Nevada State Champion

*Classifications of the racers were based largely on the physical size of the racers at the Independent i.e. non sanctioned track the Championship race was held at.

- 1976 16 Expert California Cup winner.

The California Cup was a non sanctioned series of three qualifying races held at three tracks (for a total of nine separate races) in three different regions of Northern California. Then the finals were held. The series was sponsored and promoted by BX-Weekly Magazine, a BMX newspaper and Rick Varner (R&R) Racing Products. The finals were held at the famous Corona Raceway on September 5, 1976.

==== Professional ====
National Bicycle Association (NBA)

- None

National Bicycle League (NBL)

- None

American Bicycle Association (ABA)

- None

United States Bicycle Motocross Association (USBA)

- None

International Bicycle Motocross Federation (IBMXF)

- None

Pro Series Championships

=== Notable accolades ===
- He was one of the founding members of the Professional Racing Organization (PRO) racers guild in 1977.
- In 1980 with then fellow Raleigh teammate Toby Henderson, Bottema became one of the first Americans to be invited to Europe to promote and demonstrate BMX racing.
- Created and manufactured one of BMX's most popular and famous bicycle components: the Bottema Bullet Fork. It was a tubular unicrown fork manufactured by his company that was the most popular and respected component of its type since Redline Engineering came out with the very first unicrown tube fork for BMX bicycles in 1974. The original M-1 Bullet Fork had extra thick chromoly tubing at .065" and extra long fork legs than other tubular forks of that period to reduce flex while the weight was still competitive with the lighter forks on the market. They are also of the "straight design, .i.e the fork legs are parallel with the head tube as opposed to the legs being angled forward slightly giving the bicycle a longer wheelbase. To compensate the Bottema M-1 fork had a one inch axle lead. These first models were particularly popular with BMX freestyle skatepark bowl riders like Jeff Watson and Eddie Fiola for their extra durability. Bottema had also came out in 1979 with C-1 cruiser models for 26" cruiser racing bicycles. In early 1981 he came out with the M-2 racing model with thinner tubing with the axle line further down the tube legs.
- In 1987 he won what was called the 1st Annual Masters Series, an exhibition Veteran's Pro class of old time racers of the early 1970s that was held at the ABA Supernationals in San Bernardino, California on January 18, 1987. It was staged and promoted by Scot Breithaupt a pioneer in BMX racing. It was the equivalent of Major League Baseball's Old-Timers' Day exhibition baseball games in which retired stars of the past play a nostalgic friendly game to remember the greats of baseball. This BMX "Old-Timers game" not only featured past stars but their past equipment. The era of 1974–1976 was preferred. No bicycle frame made after 1978 was allowed in the race, although more modern components like Hutch Pedals and GT hubs were allowed for the comfort of the racers. However, for the most part the equipment and uniforms were vintage early to late 1970s. Some looked like they were in storage for years. Past stars like Dennis Dain wore his old Ralph's Bike Shop/Cook Bros. jersey along with his old helmet and number plate. Bottema raced his old DG frame, numberplate and his complete vintage DG uniform complete with helmet from the mid-1970s. Even a Yamaha mono-shock Moto-bike with front and rear suspension ridden by Mark Parerria made an appearance.

The order of finish for this proto Veterans Pro Class were:

1. Jeff Bottema
2. Dennis Dain
3. Scot Breithaupt
4. Bryan Webb
5. Jumpin' John Wells
6. Pete Harrigan
7. Friendly Fred Thomas
8. Mark Parerria

This race was the forerunner of the Veterans and Masters classes which started in the early 1990s by the ABA and NBL (respectively).

- He is a 1990 Inductee to the ABA BMX Hall of Fame.

=== BMX product lines ===
- 1979: The Bottema Bullet Fork a unicrown tubular Fork manufactured by his own company.

Product Evaluations:

Bicycle Motocross Action February 1982 Vol.7 No.2 pg.80

- Jeff Bottema Team Issue Signature series frame.

Product Evaluations:

- 1980 Raleigh Team Issue Bottema Signature series frame.

Product Evaluations:

=== Significant injuries ===
- His most significant and life-threatening injury happened off the track and a couple of months after his retirement from racing. On March 16, 1984 Jeff Bottema was abducted and stabbed multiple times in a robbery in Dallas, Texas while traveling with the Murray Bicycle Road Racing team. Police rushed him to Parkland Memorial Hospital (the same hospital that treated a fatally injured President John F. Kennedy on November 22, 1963) where he was placed on the critical condition list after undergoing two operations and given many blood transfusions. By September 1984 he was virtually fully recovered and in good health.

=== Racing habits and traits ===
- He was known for his uneven teeth, much like Anthony Sewell would later be known for his Coke bottle bottom glasses. Bicycle Motocross News once commented with in-joke irony when it announced his position on a new team:

Team Webco recently added a new member to their already sizzling set up; Jeff Bottema a slick racer with a real Colgate smile!

Colgate was a well known toothpaste manufacturer. He would later correct his teeth with braces beginning around 1982.

=== Miscellaneous and trivia ===
- Bottema was the very first advanced subscription holder of Bicycle Motocross Action when he purchased one on September 5, 1976, at Corona Raceway at a cost of US$3.00
- In July 1982 Bottema purchased the industry-respected Pedal Power Bike Shop.

== Post BMX career ==
- His immediate path after his retirement from completive racing after the 1983 racing season, he moved to Nashville, Tennessee and took a position with Murray Ohio as the Murray Race Team coordinator and its in-house BMX specialist. His $35,000 a year position was responsible for both the Road and BMX racing teams. He was also the Race Coordinator of the then-annual Murray World Cup races. In 1985 he quit Murray and went to work for Lee World. He then joined Mor Distributing which manufactured the then-popular Scootster scooter. He also still had his famous fork manufacturing company.

== BMX press magazine interviews and articles ==
- "Win, win is motto" Bicycle Motocross News January/February 1975 Vol.2 No.1 pg.14. Brief profile within article about the Two Wheeler's Racing Team.
- "Jeff Bottema" Bicycle Motocross Action June 1977 Vol.2 No.2 pg.11
- "Interview: Jeff Bottema" BMX Weekly October 1, 1976 Vol.2 No.4 pg.13
- "Jeff Bottema-Superstar" The California BMX Rider September 1976 Vol.1 No.2 pg.2
- "Jeff Bottema" BMX Plus! October 1982 Vol.5 No.10 pg.82 Short mini article.

=== BMX magazine covers ===
Bicycle Motocross News:

- None

Minicycle/BMX Action & Super BMX:

- October 1982 Vol.9 No.10 (SBMX)

Bicycle Motocross Action & Go:

- August 1977 Vol.1 No.4 (60x) behind Neil Bonds (2) (BMXA)
- May 1979 Vol.4 No.3 (2072) ahead of Harry Leary (35x), tied with Kevin Jackson (7x) and behind Brian "Kronnuts" Curnell (12x) and Denis Dain (173x). (BMXA)
- November 1979 Vol.4 No.9 with teammate Toby Henderson (BMXA)
- December 1981 Vol.6 No.12 (BMXA)

BMX Plus!:

- December 1979 Vol.2 No.11* far left in fourth place behind Clint Miller (103X) leading (front and near center) and behind Stu Thomsen in second place (far right) and an obscured Jeff Kosmala (behind Miller) in third place.

*The publisher skipped an issue during 1979.

Total BMX:

- September 1982 Vol.3 No.3. This is the issue with Bottema on the cover wearing an American Broadcasting Company (ABC) television camera equipped helmet at the 1982 Murray World Cup I race.

Bicycles and Dirt:

- None

NBA World & NBmxA World (The official NBA/NBmxA membership publication):

Bicycles Today & BMX Today (The official NBL membership publication under two names):

ABA Action, American BMXer, BMXer (The official ABA membership publication under three names):

USBA Racer (The official USBA membership publication):
