= Helmet camera =

Type of camera

A helmet camera, otherwise known as a micro video camera, is an action camera, usually a closed-circuit television camera, attached to a helmet allowing someone to make a visual record from their point of view (POV), while keeping their hands and vision free.

== History ==
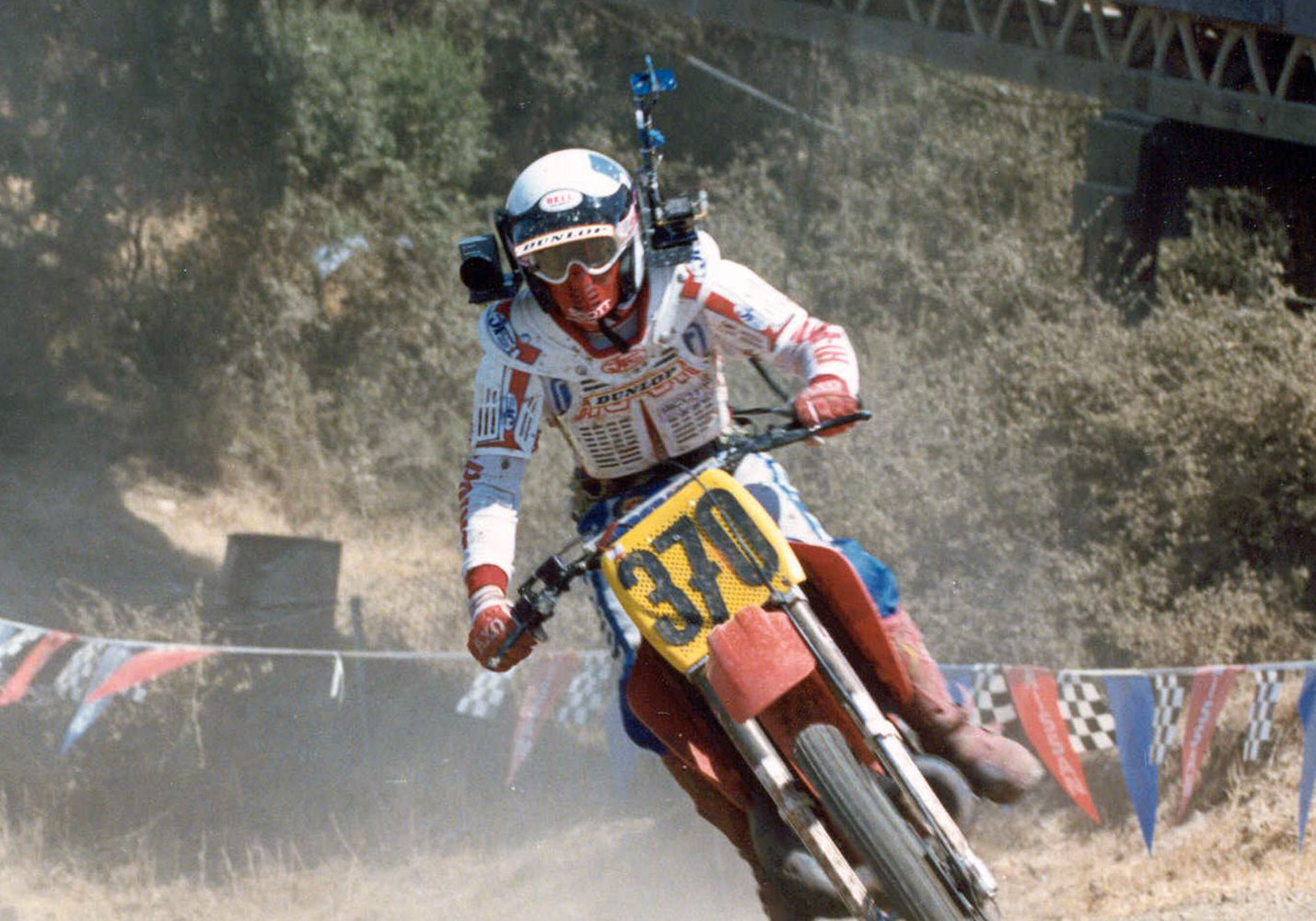
An early helmet cam. Provided by Aerial Video Systems, worn by Dick Gracia and broadcast live via microwave on ABC from the 500 World Championship at Carlsbad Raceway on June 28, 1986.

Archives containing photos of helmet cameras have surfaced over the last decade. One shows Denver Broncos backup quarterback Jacky Lee wearing a helmet camera at football practice in 1965. A mocked-up helmet camera appears in the opening scenes of The Private Afternoons of Pamela Mann, released in 1974, used by a character for voyeurism. Another early and more noble helmet video camera was a 1977 head-mounted camera designed to convert images into tactile sensations for the blind.

Almost a decade later, a Canon CI-10 camera was mounted to the side of Dick Garcia's helmet by Aerial Video Systems (AVS) of Burbank, CA at the Nissan USGP 500 World Championship at Carlsbad Raceway in Carlsbad, CA on June 28, 1986. At this time the helmet camera was used commercially. For the first time, images were transmitted live from this camera by AVS via portable microwave to the ABC broadcast truck, then integrated into their live broadcast. This innovative system showed viewers the rider's Point of View of the race as it unfolded.

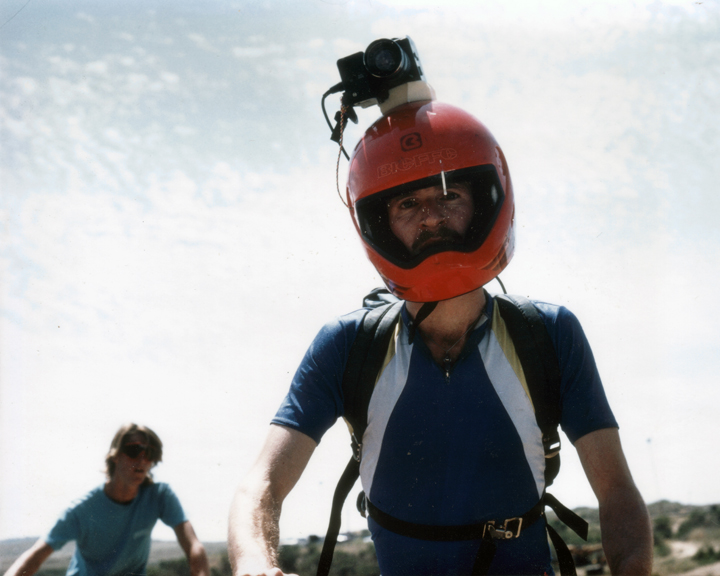
Mark Schulze wearing helmet cam in The Great Mountain Biking Video in 1987

Another early innovator of video helmet camera technology was Mark Schulze, who created a system for use while producing The Great Mountain Biking Video in 1987. "Schulze stripped-down a red motorcycle helmet and jury-rigged a mounting for the first consumer color video chip camera. A cable ran from the camera to a padded backpack that contained a Panasonic VHS portable video recorder and a DC-lead-acid battery for power, which made the rig heavy, unwieldy, and hot.

This technology brought a new perspective to live sports television and action sports videos and eventually gave way to button and lipstick cameras. The helmet cam then became a standard piece of equipment, worn by umpires, catchers, goalies and referees for live television as well as BMX riders, surfers, skiers, skydivers, hockey and soccer players and other sports participants, to record and share their experiences.

In 1991, the World League of American Football introduced the innovation of a miniature camera mounted on the right side of the VSR-3 Riddell helmet worn by quarterbacks. This rig was developed by USA Network and Aerial Video Systems (AVS). An antenna was placed in the crown of the helmet between an inflatable pad and the shell. Each of these Helmet-Cams cost $20,000 and transmitted live game action. These helmet cams were briefly used to provide live player's-eye-view footage in professional American football. However, their use was discontinued after players complained of the extra weight, and TV networks became concerned about the aggressive behavior the cameras captured.

In 2002, after graduating with a degree in Visual Arts from UCSD, Nick Woodman, a long-time surfer, created the GoPro camera. This was a small, wearable camera with a waterproof housing for people to share their personal experiences in sports and other endeavors with the world.

Today's generation of helmet cameras offer features like on-screen menus, high-definition format, wireless transmitting to an offsite recording device, waterproof enclosures, multiple mounts and 3D capabilities.

== Camera types ==
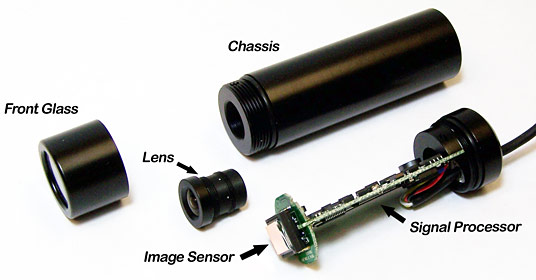
Helmet Camera

Helmet cameras generally fall into two main categories; CMOS and CCD type. Although helmet cameras take on a variety of forms, the majority are small cylindrical cameras resembling a tube of lipstick or a bullet. Helmet cameras may be connected to a video recording device with video input capability, such as a handheld camcorder, or purpose built digital video recorder.

CCD helmet cameras are based upon the charge-coupled device (CCD) image sensor. They typically operate on 12 VDC power and output an analog type signal. These cameras draw more power than CMOS cameras but offer superior picture quality and better color replication.

CMOS helmet cameras are based upon the complementary metal–oxide–semiconductor (CMOS) image sensor. They typically operate on 5 VDC and draw very little power. CMOS cameras are also generally smaller than the CCD type.

== Applications ==
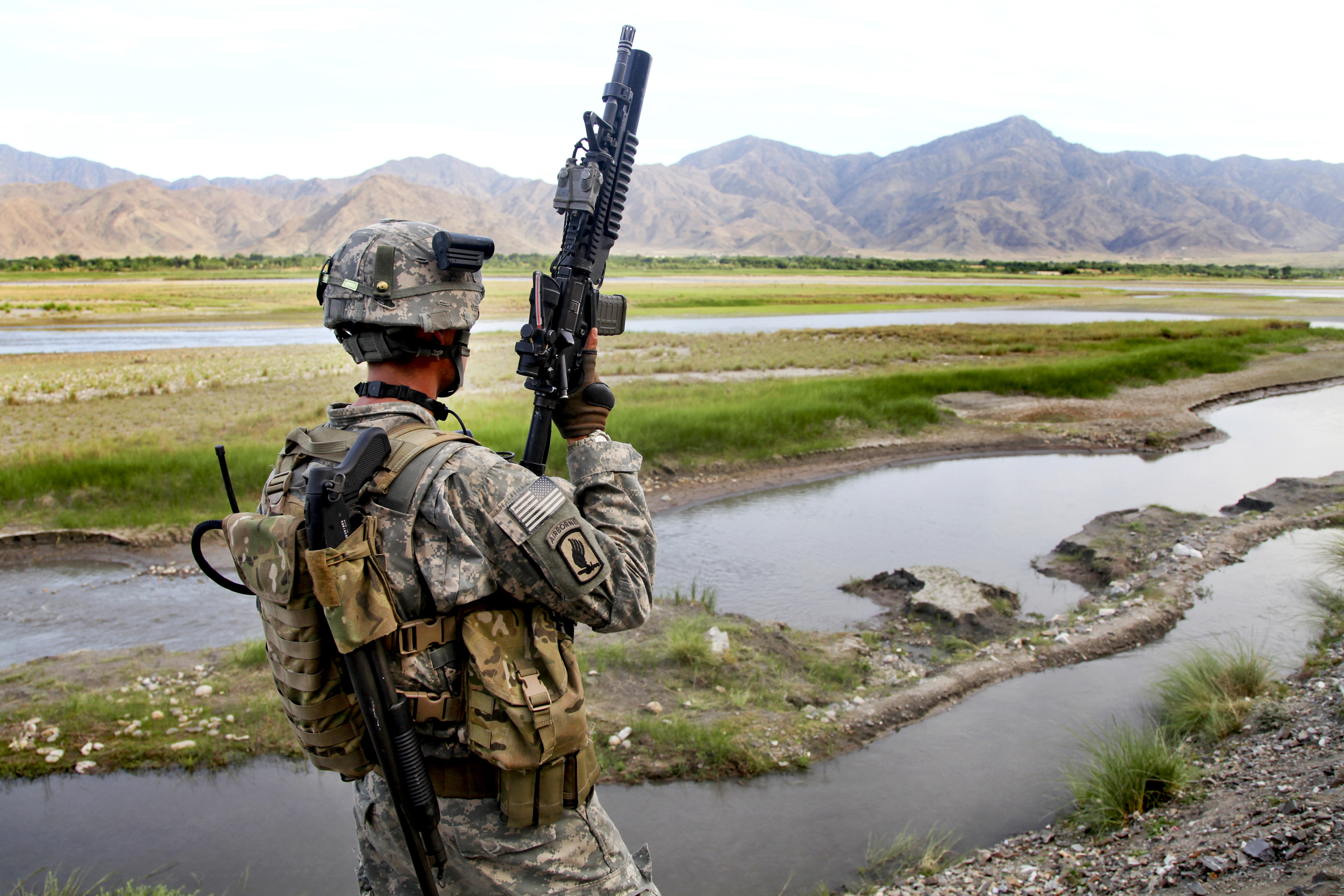
US soldier in Afghanistan with a personal helmet camera, 2010.

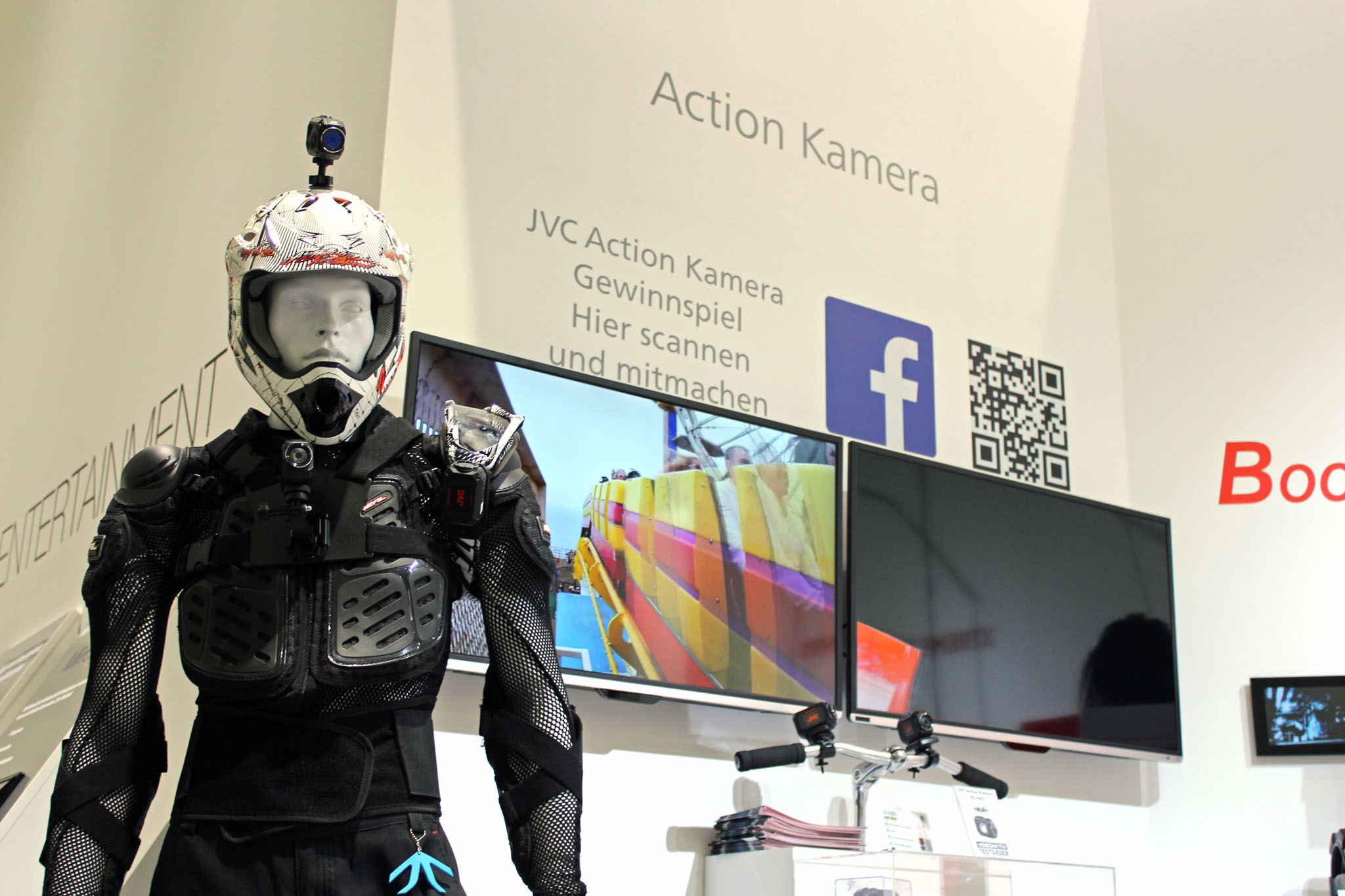
Action camera that mounts on helmet and elsewhere

Many sports enthusiasts use helmet cameras to capture the essence of the sports they love. For example, many paraglider pilots carry a bullet camera to record their flights. This can be mounted on the helmet, foot or elsewhere to capture unique camera angles. There are many samples of helmet camera videos available on the net. Wearing helmet cameras is also proving popular with cyclists as a safety aid as it allows cyclists to record their journeys and to record any incidents from their point of view. This recording can be used in a court as evidence.

In 2006, a British cyclist was convicted of abusing traffic wardens, using evidence from a helmet camera. Also in 2006, in the documentary Race To Dakar, Charley Boorman, Matt Hall and Simon Pavey used helmet cams to document their participation the 2006 Dakar rally. Out of the trio, Pavey was the only member of the "Race To Dakar" team wearing the camera to make it to the Senegalese Capital and (the rally's finish).

In 2011, Ben Maher won the Martin Collins Eraser Stakes at London Olympia horse show while wearing a helmet camera. Firefighters have begun to utilize helmet cams as a tool to assess their responses to fires and allow non-firefighters to see the reality of what occurs inside a burning building. One technological improvement that fire departments would employ would be thermal imaging detection of differences in heat.

Helmet cameras are also being used in various militaries, where video footage can be streamed back to a command center or military outpost. A notable instance of this was the U.S. military's killing of Osama bin Laden, where live video footage of the raid is believed to have been streamed to the White House. In 2013, Royal Marine Alexander Blackman was convicted of murder for killing a captive Taliban insurgent; footage from incident, recorded on a helmet camera, was used in Blackman's court-martial. The conviction was overturned in 2017 and reduced to manslaughter on the grounds of diminished responsibility with Blackman being released from jail. The helmet camera, has been the focus of the Discovery Channels latest war series Taking Fire about the 101st Airborne in the Korengal documenting their personal war footage.

In 2012, on the occasion of the 50th birthday of RP FLIP ("Floating Instrument Platform"), several GoPro action cameras were placed on various positions aboard the research vessel to capture it as it flipped and descended into the ocean. In 2016 "a camera recovered from the helmet of a dead fighter offers a contrasting picture of chaos and panic in a battle with Kurdish peshmerga."

== See also ==
- Body camera
- Police body camera
- Sousveillance
- Refcam
