= Refcam =

Type of camera used in sports

A Refcam (also known as Referee cam or Umpire cam) is a special type of broadcast point-of-view camera used in sports and worn by a referee or umpire during the game.

Modern systems offer several mounting configurations depending on the sport and production requirements . The most common are chest-mounted cameras (often called *chestcams*), such as those developed by MindFly and used in professional Soccer, American Football, Hockey, Baseball, and Basketball in live broadcasts. Other configurations include helmet-mounted cameras (*helmet cam*), and ear-mounted systems (*earcams*), produced by companies such as Mindfly, Movicom, Riedel and JockeyCam for use by referees in soccer and rugby.

== Usage ==
Refcams are being used in various sports like American football, ice hockey, field hockey, baseball and other.

== See also ==
- Helmet camera
- Body camera
