= The Great Mountain Biking Video =

Biking instructional video released in the late 1980s

- Directed by: Mark Schulze
- Written by: Patty Mooney
- Produced by: Mark Schulze
- Starring: Chris Dornsife; John Howard; Julia Ingersoll
- Cinematography: Mark Schulze
- Edited by: Patty Mooney
- Production companies: New & Unique Videos
- Distributed by: New & Unique Videos
- Release date: January 1, 1988 (United States)
- Running time: 55 minutes
- Country: USA
- Language: English
- Budget: $15,000

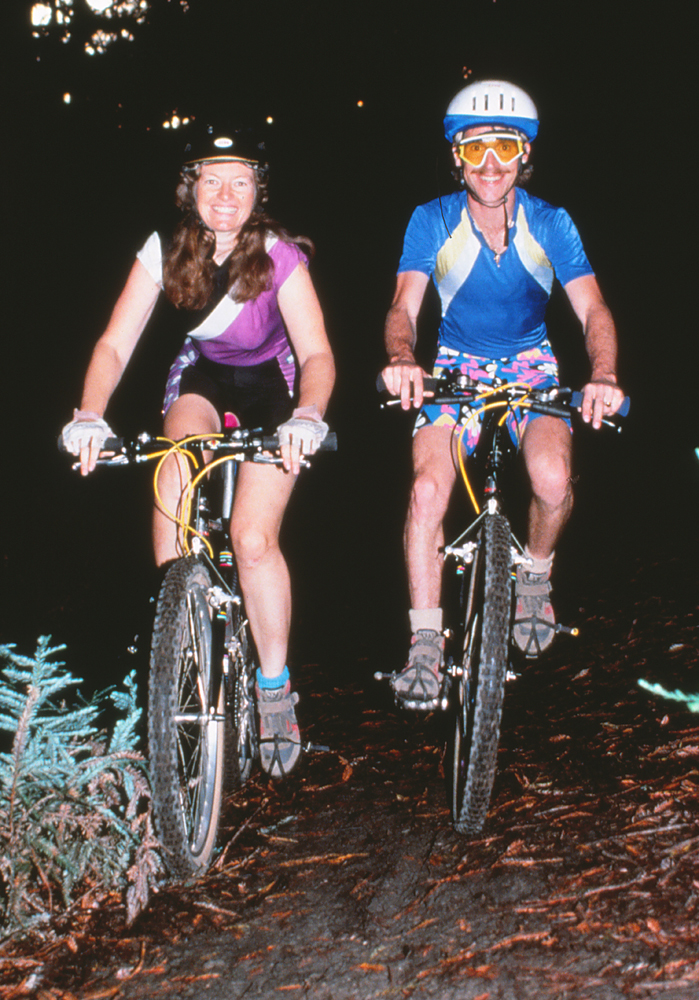
Patty Mooney and Mark Schulze Marry on Mountain Bikes in Cleveland National Forest, 1987 - Photo by Rolf Schulze

The Great Mountain Biking Video is a mountain biking instructional videotape, produced in 1987 and released in 1988 by San Diego, USA video production company New & Unique Videos.

== History ==
Patty Mooney and Mark Schulze, an early innovator of the Helmet camera, learned about the sport of Mountain biking while in Canada in 1986. In 1987, the couple produced the mountain biking video, The Great Mountain Biking Video. The video featured mountain-bike racing professionals Ned Overend, Martha Kennedy, John Tomac, Julia Ingersoll, Tinker Juarez, Trials rider, Kevin Norton and Olympian John Howard who instructed viewers on how to properly ride a mountain bike. Fastest recorded woman on a bicycle, Denise Mueller also appears as a young girl in the video.

The video was favorably reviewed by Video Choice, The Video Rating Guide for Libraries, and Billboard Magazine. It was officially endorsed by the National Off-Road Bike Association, now a division of USA Cycling.

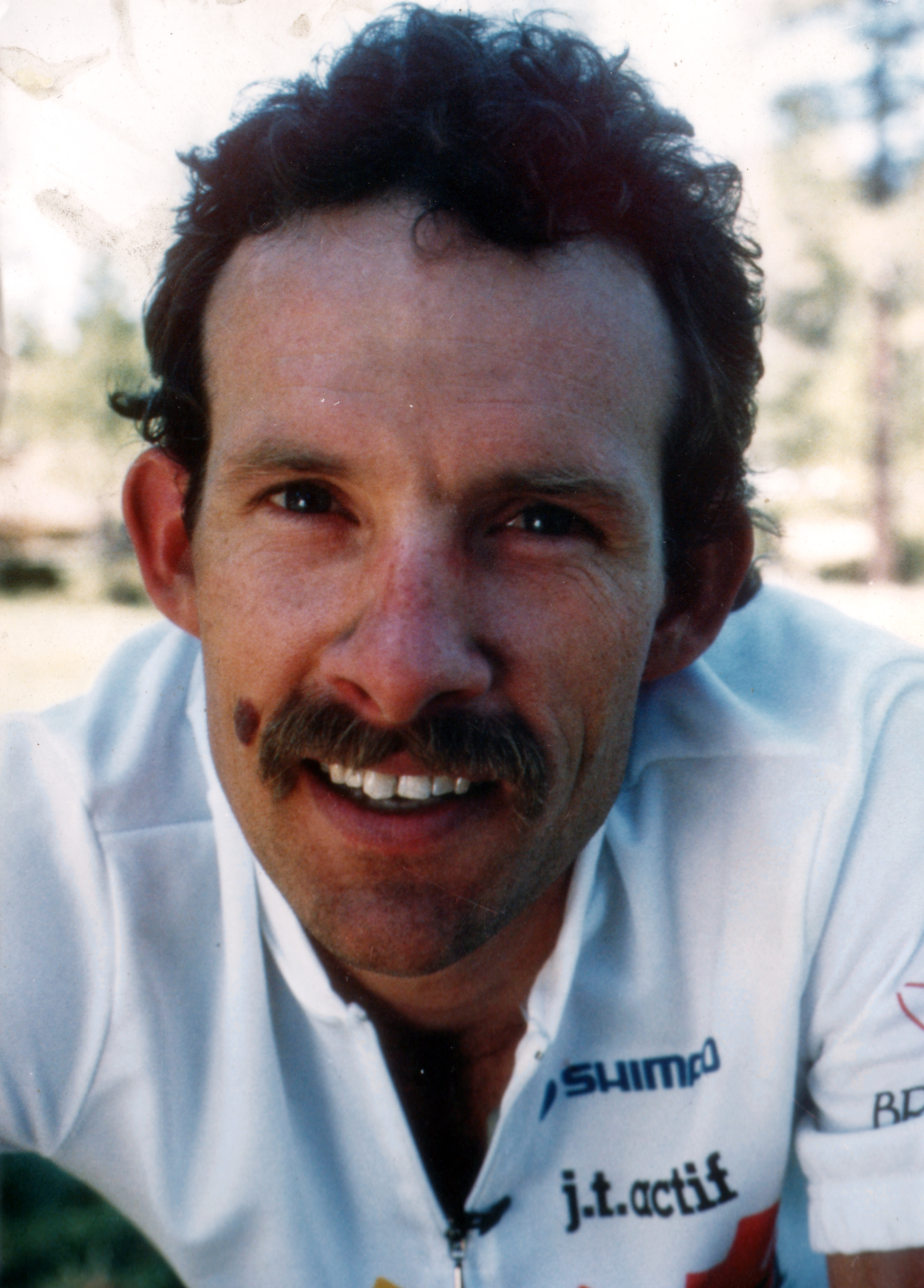
Ned Overend Appearing in The Great Mountain Biking Video

The Great Mountain Bike Video was one of the first instructional videos demonstrating mountain biking techniques, and also includes early use of the Helmet camera.
