= Killing of Jamarion Robinson =

2016 police shooting in Atlanta, Georgia

- Date: August 5, 2016
- Location: East Point, Georgia, US
- Type: Police shooting
- Accused: Eric Heinze; Kristopher Hutchens
- Charges: Felony murder, burglary, aggravated assault and making false statements

On August 5, 2016, Jamarion Rashad Robinson, a 26-year-old African American man who had been diagnosed with paranoid schizophrenia, was shot 59 times and killed in a police raid in East Point, Georgia, a suburb of Atlanta. The shooting occurred when at least 14 officers of a Southeast Regional Fugitive Taskforce from at least seven different agencies, led by U.S. Marshals, forcibly entered the apartment of Robinson's girlfriend to serve a warrant for his arrest. The officers were heavily armed, including with submachine guns. The warrant was being served on behalf of the Gwinnett County police and the Atlanta Police Department, and authorities said they had sought his arrest for attempted arson and aggravated assault of a police officer. The Georgia Bureau of Investigation (GBI) stated that Robinson had been repeatedly ordered to put down a weapon and that officers who had been involved in the shooting reported Robinson fired at them three times.

The case has been highlighted as an example of excessive force by law enforcement officers, systemic racism in law enforcement, a lack of knowledge in police who interact with people who have a mental illness, a lack of transparency and accountability surrounding the actions of police officers, and a lack of use of body cameras by police and U.S. Marshals when serving arrest warrants.

A civil lawsuit has been pursued by the mother of Jamarion Robinson since 2018, and on October 27, 2021, U.S. Marshal Eric Heinze and Clayton County Police officer Kristopher Hutchens were criminally charged with felony murder, burglary, aggravated assault and making false statements in connection with the shooting.

== Background ==
Jamarion Robinson had been a biology student at Clark Atlanta University (CAU), and had been a running back on the football teams of CAU and Tuskegee University, but he had paused his education several years prior to the incident. According to his mother, he was in the process of transferring to Tuskegee University and had texted her two days before the shooting to tell her he had just enrolled there for what would be his final semester.

He had no criminal record other than a series of misdemeanor traffic violations in the previous two years. His family said they believe the police were seeking him due to mistaking him for someone else. Police showed a photo of the man they were seeking to his grandmother, and she said "That's not my grandson."

== Incident ==
On August 5, 2016, officers of a Southeast Regional Fugitive Taskforce from at least seven different agencies, led by U.S. Marshals, forcibly entered the apartment of Robinson's girlfriend to serve a warrant for his arrest. Police have said they were serving a warrant for Robinson's arrest on charges of attempted arson and aggravated assault of a police officer. Robinson was staying with his girlfriend at the time of the incident, and lived with his mother in Lawrenceville. Police claimed they opened fire after Robinson refused to exit his girlfriend's apartment and was seen with a gun in his hand. A cellphone video that included the sounds of the shooting was recorded by a resident standing near the apartment. The shooting continued for nearly three minutes. Police stated that Robinson had been repeatedly ordered to put down a weapon and had fired at them three times.

A few weeks before the incident, his mother had called the police to try to get them to help him get mental health assistance. He had poured gasoline on the floor beneath his bed and in front of his mother's bedroom. At the time, he also had an outstanding warrant for his arrest for allegedly pointing a gun at officers before fleeing when he was confronted at the apartment complex of a friend. His mother had told police about his recent diagnosis of paranoid schizophrenia, but they did not bring any mental health practitioners with them for the raid.

According to an investigator hired by the family, the evidence showed that after killing Robinson, police handcuffed his hands behind his back, dragged his body down the stairs from the second floor to the living room on the lower level, and threw a flash-bang grenade into the area after the shooting in an apparent attempt to confuse the investigation of the scene. The body was also found to be wearing an oxygen rebreathing mask when recovered by the medical examiner. The family said that a pathologist found that Robinson had been shot several times through the palms of both hands. It was alleged at a pretrial hearing that the officers continued shooting Robinson after realizing he had become unresponsive. The bystander's audio recording of the incident includes three shots that were fired after the grenade explosion; there had been a lull in the shooting before the grenade went off, and Robinson was on the ground and had allegedly exhibited no response to the grenade.

The medical report on Robinson's body listed 76 bullet wounds, 59 of which were identified as entry wounds and the other 17 as exit wounds. None of the officers were injured in the incident. None of the police officers involved in the shooting wore body cameras.

== Investigation ==
Bullets recovered at the scene included 9 mm, .40 caliber H&K submachine gun bullets, and .40 caliber Glock ammunition. Two of the 9 mm bullets were later recovered at the scene by the family's investigator, who found them embedded deep into the floor at the top of the stairwell and said they appeared to have been fired directly downwards into Robinson or the floor (although this was on the second floor, above where the police were standing when the shooting began).

On the day after the shooting, the Georgia Bureau of Investigation (GBI) released a statement saying Robinson had been repeatedly ordered to put down a weapon before the shooting began. A handgun was later recovered at the scene that the GBI said was "believed to be associated with Robinson", and it was reported that officers who had been involved in the shooting said Robinson fired at them three times, but a lawsuit filed by the family said the handgun was actually damaged and was not operable.

== Lack of body camera use ==
The ACLU highlighted the case as an illustration of how police officers, and particularly U.S. Marshals, were often not wearing body cameras, and strongly advocated that they start using them under more circumstances. Paul Howard, the District Attorney of Fulton County, agreed, saying "If we had body cams, a lot of the issues that have been raised about that case would go away." It was reported that U.S. Marshals were never wearing body cameras, even when serving arrest warrants. Some of the officers involved in the raid were from the East Point Police, who ordinarily had vehicles outfitted with dash cameras, but in this instance new vehicles were used that did not have cameras installed.

== Legal action ==
In January 2018, Robinson's family filed a lawsuit against the officers involved in the shooting, alleging that Robinson had not posed any immediate threat to the officers or others at the time of the shooting and that the officers violated Robinson's civil rights. The suit claimed the officers had "conspired among and between themselves to unreasonably stop, seize, shoot and injure Jamarion Robinson in violation of his Constitutional rights, to destroy and fabricate evidence, to complete false, inaccurate and misleading reports, and to make false statements to superior officers in order to conceal their wrongdoing." In addition to officers of the U.S. Marshals Service, those named in the suit were officers from the police or fire departments of Atlanta, Clayton County, East Point, Fayette County and Fulton County.

District Attorney Paul Howard tried to investigate the shooting, but the U.S. Marshals Service did not cooperate with his investigation. On December 28, 2018, he filed a federal lawsuit against the U.S. Department of Justice for failing to provide information about the case in response to Freedom of Information Act requests. He said that federal authorities had prevented his prosecutors from interviewing the officers who were involved in the shooting and had refused to turn over any documents relating to the case. According to his lawsuit filing, more than 90 rounds of ammunition had been fired into or within the apartment.

In January 2019, after the Department of Justice raised procedural objections, Howard withdrew subpoenas to interview some of the officers involved in the shooting, which he said was in a "spirit of cooperation" with the agency. In June 2020, Robinson's family said they had lost confidence in Howard's investigation. Robinson's mother said "Paul Howard has failed my family and has not tried to indict the officers who murdered my son even though he's been promising me he's going to take action for nearly four years. ... I do not believe him at all!"

=== Civil lawsuit ===
A civil lawsuit was filed in 2018 by Robinson's mother Monteria Robinson, alleging wrongful death and excessive force. The case was dismissed twice by the Chief U.S. District Judge Timothy Batten. The first was in 2021 with the judge saying the officers' "use of force was objectively reasonable" and their actions were covered by the doctrine of "qualified immunity", but that was appealed and overturned. In August 2022, the 11th Circuit Court of Appeals ruled in favor of Monteria Robinson for potential liability for officer Eric Heinze, citing the video and audio recording as evidence of a "genuine dispute of material fact", since the sound captured three bursts of automatic gunfire after the grenade explosion, which contradicted the testimony of Heinze, since he had said he stopped firing after the grenade went off. The circuit court upheld the ruling of qualified immunity for officer Kristopher Hutchens, since his weapon could not have produced the sounds that had followed the grenade explosion, but did not address some aspects of the case against Hutchens. The circuit court called for a jury trial on the question of whether excessive force had been used. However, Batten dismissed the case for a second time in February 2023, saying the mother's claims were pursued as claims against state officials and thus could not apply to those acting as U.S. Marshals. Robinson's mother appealed that decision the following month.

=== Criminal proceedings ===
On October 27, 2021, a grand jury indicted law enforcement officers Eric Heinze and Kristopher Hutchens on charges of felony murder, burglary, aggravated assault and making false statements in connection with the shooting. Heinze was a U.S. deputy marshal at the time of the shooting, and Hutchens was a police officer, and they were members of the fugitive task force executing the arrest warrant for Robinson. A third officer, Daniel Doyle, died of cancer before an indictment could be secured. The case marks the first time that a member of the U.S. Marshals Service (Heinze) has faced charges for a fatal shooting while on duty.

Shortly after the indictment was filed, lawyers for Heinze and Hutchens requested that the trial be moved to a federal court due to the two defendants acting on behalf of a federal task force. The Fulton County District Attorney's office subsequently filed a motion that the trial remain in a state court, citing the fact that they were indicted on state murder charges for killing a Georgia citizen while executing a state warrant. The officers appeared in state court on March 1, 2022, and pleaded not guilty to all charges. The court ultimately ruled that the murder case should be moved to federal court, with a pre-trial hearing scheduled for November 15, 2022.

During pretrial motions for the criminal trial, the defense argued that charges against Heinze and Hutchens should be dismissed due to qualified immunity, whereas the prosecution argued that the search during which Robinson was shot was unconstitutional because a search warrant had not been obtained. Lawyers for the defendants argued that a warrant was not required in the circumstances because the officers were aware that Robinson, a fugitive, was on the premises.

A hearing on the two officers' immunity claims concluded on June 22, 2023, with U.S. District Judge Victoria Marie Calvert presiding.

== Protest action ==
Robinson's death was highlighted by activists during the "National Day of Outrage" on October 28, 2019, along with the deaths of Atatiana Jefferson, Kendrick Johnson, Nicholas Thomas, and Jimmy Atchison. Members of the New Black Panther Party organized and marched in honor of African-American individuals shot and killed by police in recent years. Students at the Atlanta University Center used the hashtag #AUCShutItDown to voice support of Robinson's family and draw attention to his death.

The case was also highlighted during nationwide protests in the wake of the murder of George Floyd in Minneapolis in May 2020.

One of the officers involved in the shooting had been arrested and charged with aggravated assault and property damage in June 2020 in an incident involving the tasing of two students as they sat in their car during a protest held around Atlanta University Center during the George Floyd–related protests. This officer had also been involved in other previous cases of alleged excessive force, including the shooting death of an unarmed shop customer in the mid-1990s that resulted in a settlement of $1.4 million paid by the city and the shooting of another unarmed man in 2012.
