= Toby Henderson =

American bicycle motocross racer (born 1961)

Personal information
- Full name: Toby S. Henderson
- Nicknames: "Coca-Cola Cowboy" "Captain Elbows" "Hollywood Henderson"
- Born: October 10, 1961 (age 65) Bedford, Indiana, United States
- Height: 1.83 m (6 ft 0 in)
- Weight: 78 kg (172 lb)

Cycling career
- Sport: Cycling
- Current team: Retired
- Discipline: Bicycle Motocross (BMX)
- Role: Racer
- Rider type: Off Road

Amateur teams
- 1974-1976: Bottema
- 1976: Cerritos Bike Shop
- 1976-1977: Ralph's Bicycles
- 1977-1978: Hiatus from racing
- 1978: DG

Professional teams
- 1979: DG
- 1979-1981: Raleigh
- 1981-1984: Hutch
- 1984-1985: SE Racing
- 1986: Father
- 1986-1987: BMX Action
- 1988: GT Racing

Toby S. Henderson (born October 10, 1961) is a former professional American "Old School" Bicycle Motocross (BMX) racer whose prime competitive years were between 1979 and 1985. He was given the nickname "Coca Cola Cowboy" by Bob Osborn, publisher of BMX Action magazine, although the reason for it was unknown even by Henderson. He himself regard it as "lame".

== Racing career ==
Henderson started racing in 1973 at the age of 12 at Hollyfield Park in Norwalk, California. In a September 1982 BMX Action his first race was claimed to be Scot Briethaupt's B.U.M.S track. He rode a Schwinn Sting-Ray bicycle at that time. He turned professional in December 1978, and came in third at the Pro Class at the National Bicycle Association (NBA) Supernationals in Saddleback Park in Irvine, California on April 8, 1979.

He retired in 1987 aged 26. His last national race as a serious competitor appears to have been the United States Bicycle Motocross Association (USBA) Grandnational in Dallas, Texas on November 11, 1986. He came in seventh in "A" pro, the senior pro level. It was the last USBA sanctioned race before the USBA merged with the American Bicycle Association (ABA) in 1987. Henderson then pursued a Mountain Bike racing career. He would later race at least one BMX race in 1987 at the Vision World Cup in Irvine, California on June 21, 1987. He did not make any mains.

During his career, he was sponsored by Jeff Bottema's uncle (1974 to 1976), then by D.G. Performance Specialist (late 1978 to June 1979), and finally by Raleigh Cycle Company of America (July 1979 to January 1981). Other sponsors included SE Racing (January 1984 to December 1985), "DAD" (January 1986-February 1986), BMX Action Magazine (February 1986-March 1987), and GT Bicycles (April 1988 – 1991).

=== Titles ===
National Bicycle League (NBL)

- 1980 National No.3 Pro
- 1981 Pro Cruiser Knott's Berry Farm Grand National Champion (NBL, United Bicycle Racers (UBR) & World Wide Bicycle Motocross Association (WWBMXA) sanctioned.)
- 1982 National No.2 Pro Cruiser
- 1983 "A" Pro Grandnational Champion
- 1984 Pro Cruiser Grandnational Champion
- 1984 Pro Cruiser National No.1

United States Bicycle Motocross Association (USBA)

- 1985 National No.2 Pro and National Pro Cruiser No.2
- 1986 National No.3 Pro

Pro Series Championships

- 1981 Pro Cruiser International Grand Championship Champion

=== Injuries ===
Henderson broke his collarbone at the NBL North Park National in Pittsburgh, Pennsylvania on August 9, 1981. He crashed in his first Pro Trophy qualifying moto when his front wheel failed to clear adequately and struck the second of double moguls, breaking the front end of the Thruster frame he was racing and catapulting him at high speed into the ground head first. He was laid up for approximately six weeks until the 1981 NBL Grandnational in St. Louis, Missouri held on September 26, 1981. He didn't make it out of his Senior "A" pro quarter semi finals, but came in third in the Pro Trophy competition.

== Accolades ==
Henderson was inducted to the ABA BMX Hall of Fame in 1994. He was inducted into the United States Bicycling Hall of Fame.
