= Taking Fire =

Documentary series

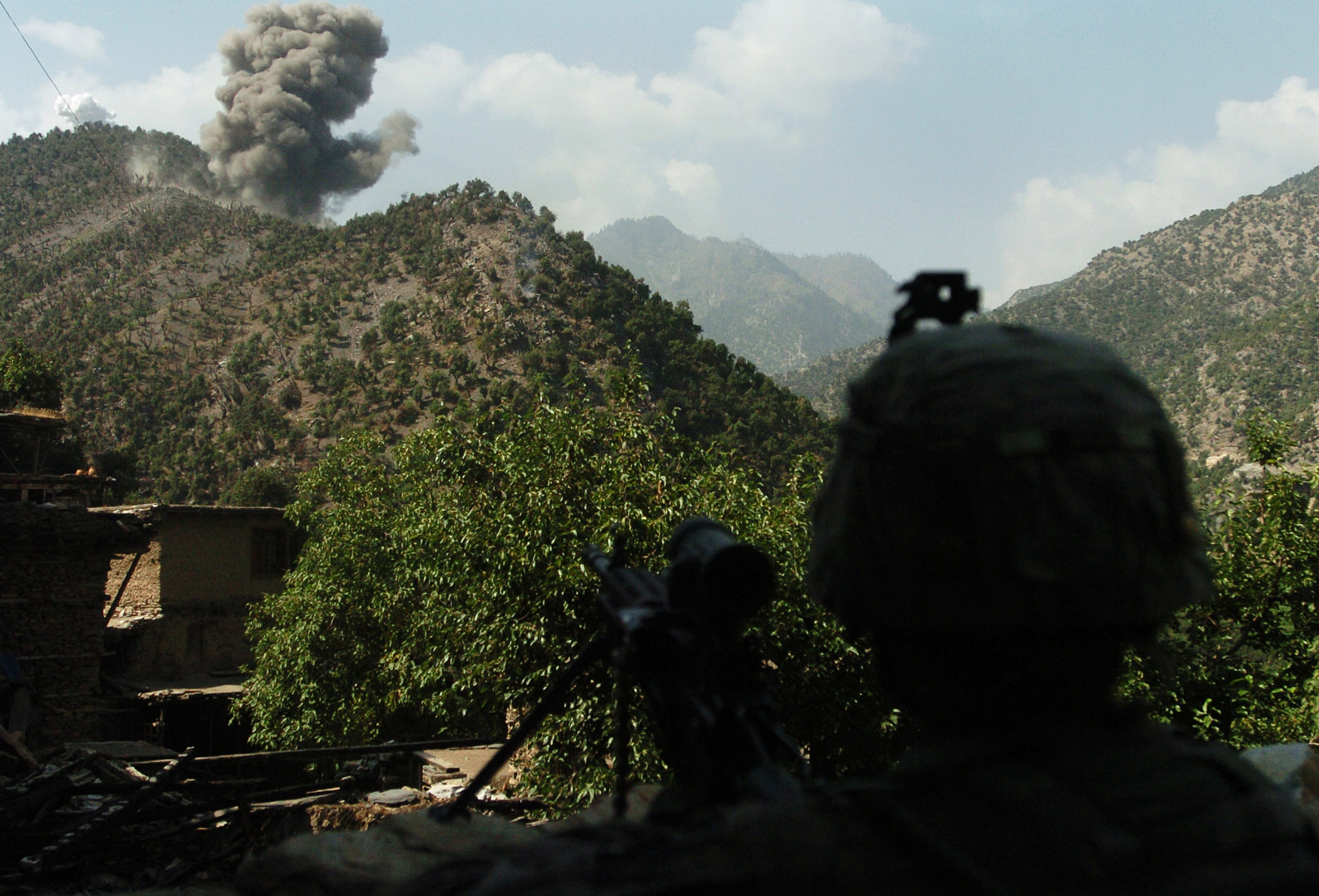

Taking Fire is a documentary series produced for Discovery Channel in which members of the 101st Airborne Division filmed their deployment in Afghanistan largely through the use of helmet cameras and hand-held cameras. The filming took place in the Korangal Valley; in order to avoid compromising mission integrity, the United States military reviewed all footage of the series prior to its publication by Discovery. The documentary captured video of American soldiers in combat against the Taliban in the Islamic Republic of Afghanistan as well as descriptions from members of the 101st Airborne regarding their comrades killed in action and the military operations in which the Division participated.
