= Tinker Juarez =

American cyclist (born 1961)

Personal information
- Full name: David Juarez
- Nicknames: "Tinker", "Hollifield Flash"
- Born: March 4, 1961 (age 65) Downey, California, United States
- Height: 1.73 m (5 ft 8 in)
- Weight: 63.5 kg (140 lb; 10.00 st)

Cycling career
- Sport: Cycling
- Current team: -
- Disciplines: Bicycle Motocross (BMX); Mountain bike racing (MTB)
- Role: Racer
- Rider type: BMX: Off Road; MTB: Cross-country

Amateur teams
- 1974: Two Wheeler's
- 1974-1975: Bicycle Motocros News
- 1975-1976: Kawasaki Motors
- 1976: National Bicycle Association
- 1976-77: Mongoose

Professional teams
- 1977-1982: Mongoose
- 1982: JMC Racing
- 1983-1985: Bandito Racing
- 1985: ODI
- 1985: Maximum
- 1989-1989: General Bicycles
- 1990-1993: Klein Bicycles
- 1994-2002: Volvo/Cannondale
- 2003: Siemens/Cannondale
- 2004-2005: Mona Vie
- 2006-2021: Mona Vie/Cannondale

Major wins
- 1995 Pan Am Games Gold Medalist; 2001,'02,'03,'04 24-hour endurance category National Champion
Medal record
Representing United States
Men's mountain bike racing
World Championships
Silver medal – second place	1994 Vail	Cross-country

David "Tinker" Juarez (born March 4, 1961) is an American former professional BMX and cross-country mountain bike racer. His prime competitive years in BMX were from 1978 to 1984 and in mountain bike racing from 1986 to 2005. Since late 2005, he has competed as a Marathon mountain bike racer. In all three disciplines, he has won numerous national and international competitions. Most recently, Juarez finished third in the 2006 Race Across America Endurance bicycle race.

Born in Downey, California, Tinker Juarez is a cyclist who has made significant impacts in the cycling disciplines of BMX Racing, Freestyle BMX, Cross-country Mountain Bike racing, and now Marathon Mountain Bike racing for over thirty years.

== BMX racing career milestones ==
Note: In the early days of professional racing, 1977 and prior, many tracks offered small purse prize money to the older racers of an event, even before the official sanctioning bodies offered prize money in formal divisions themselves. Hence some early "professionals" like Stu Thomsen turning "pro" in 1975 at 16 years old where racing for small amounts of money at track events when offered even before the NBA, regarded as the first true national BMX sanctioning body, had a professional division. For the sake of consistency and standardization noted professional first are for the first pro races for prize money offered by official BMX sanctioning bodies and not independent track events. Professional first are also on the national level unless otherwise indicated.

Milestone	Event details
Started racing:	1974 at 13 years of age.
Sanctioning body:	Independent track.
Home sanctioning body district(s):	National Bicycle Association (NBA) District "X" (Southern California/Los Angeles County) 1973–1981; American Bicycle Association (ABA) California District 22 (CA-22) (1982)
First race bike:	
First race result:	
First win (local):	
First sponsor:	
First national win:	In 14 & Over Intermediate at the first annual National Bicycle Association (NBA) Grandnational Championship in Newhall, California on November 23, 1975.). This was the first ever BMX Grandnational Championship.
Turned Professional:	1977 Age 16.
First Professional race result:	
First Professional win:	
Height and weight at height of his career:	Ht:5'8" Wt:~140 lb.
Retired:	1986 at age 25. His possible last race was the NBL War of the Stars IX National in Montclair, California on April 27, 1986. He came in third in Pro Cruiser. His name apparently drops off the national results listing permanently after this race. He transitions to mountain biking during the summer of 1986. Unlike most BMXers who "retire", he never looked back and dedicated the rest of his cycling career to Mountain Biking and later endurance Road Racing.

*At the time, there was no separate pro class for pros due to the relatively small number of pros. They raced with the 16 Experts, making it a Pro/Am class essentially. This is why, during the early years of the pro division, the national number one racer of a sanctioning body could be either an amateur or professional. This practice continued until the NBA's 1979 season, in which the pros earned separate pro points and a separate pro plate from the amateurs.

=== Career factory and major bicycle shop sponsors ===
Note: This listing only denotes the racer's primary sponsors. At any given time a racer could have numerous ever-changing co-sponsors. Primary sponsorships can be verified by BMX and MTB press coverage and sponsor's advertisements at the time in question. When possible exact dates are used.

==== Amateur ====
- Two Wheeler's BMX: 1974
- Bicycle Motocross News Team (Test Rider/Racer): Late 1974-November 1975
- Kawasaki Motors: November 1975-Early 1976
- National Bicycle Association: Early 1976-Mid 1976
- Mongoose (BMX Products): Mid 1976-February 14, 1982. Tinker would turn professional with this sponsor.

==== Professional ====
- Mongoose: 1976-February 14, 1982. He was sponsorless for approximately three months after his separation from Mongoose.
- JMC (Jim Melton Cyclery) Racing Equipment: Mid May 1982-December 1982.
- Bandito Racing: January 1983-Early February 1985
- ODI (Ornate Design, Inc.): April 13, 1985 – April 14, 1985. Seemed to have been a one weekend sponsorship since "ODI" does not appear next to Juarez's name in the BMX Plus! race results after this weekend. This company first started out making Christmas ornaments but switched to making bicycle grips and later grips for power tools as well as BMX and skateboarding accessories.
- Maximum: Early July 1985-

=== Career bicycle motocross titles ===
Note: Listed are District, State/Provincial/Department, Regional, National, and International titles in italics. "Defunct" refers to the fact that the sanctioning body in question no longer exists at the start of the racer's career or at that stage of his/her career. Depending on the point totals of individual racers, winners of Grand Nationals do not necessarily win National titles. Series and one-off championships are also listed in a block.

==== Amateur ====
National Bicycle Association (NBA)

- 1975 14 & Over Novice Western States Champion
- 1975 14 & Over Intermediate Grandnational Champion #2 (Jeff Bottema was the winner of the first Main). This was the first ever BMX Grandnational Championship.
- 1976 15 Expert Winternational Champion
- 1976 14-15 Expert Western States Champion
- 1976 15 Expert California State Champion

National Bicycle League (NBL)

- None

American Bicycle Association (ABA)

- None

United States Bicycle Motocross Association (USBA)

- None

International Bicycle Motocross Federation (IBMXF)

==== Professional ====
National Bicycle Association (NBA)

- None

National Bicycle League (NBL)

- None

American Bicycle Association (ABA)

- 1982 Pro Cruiser 2nd Place Jag World Champion (ABA sanctioned)

United States Bicycle Motocross Association (USBA)

- None

International Bicycle Motocross Federation (IBMXF)

- None

Independent Events and Series

- 1983 "A" Pro Second Place and Pro Cruiser Third Place Jag BMX World Super Bowl Championship Champion

=== Freestyle BMX ===
In April 1980, Tinker was named the first King of the Skateparks by Bicycle Motocross Action magazine. He even graced the April 1980 cover of the magazine, making it one of the first pure freestyle magazine covers by a BMX magazine. Although no contest was ever held, it was a general declaration for his highly advanced maneuvers that no one was matching at the time.

=== Career BMX accolades ===
- He was Bicycle Motocross Action's very first star interview in their first issue (December 1976/January 1977).
- He was one of the founding members of the Professional Racing Organization (PRO), the first attempt at a BMX racer's guild in 1977.
- He is a 1993 inductee into the ABA BMX Hall of Fame.

=== Significant BMX related injuries ===
Tinker, despite eventually becoming a top pro BMXer in racing and gaining "high airs" in both dirt jumping and vertical freestyle, went ten years without breaking a bone. It is very common for BMXers, especially in the pro ranks, to become occasionally seriously injured because they are pushing themselves to as far as their talents can take them and beyond at high speeds, or in the case of vertical freestyle and dirt jumping to high altitudes and distances.

=== Miscellaneous and trivia ===
Tinker also participated in what was called Formula One (F-1) bicycle racing. F-1 racing was a short lived fad from 1987 to 1989 that involved bicycles with 20" wheels that looked like a cross between BMX, Road Race Touring and Mountain bicycles. Other famous BMX stars, both retired and active at the time, participated, including Harry Leary, Pete Loncarevich, David Clinton, Stu Thomsen, Eddy and Mike King. The two major BMX sanctioning bodies, ABA and NBL, sanctioned the events. Tinker won the first ABA sponsored F-1 series race in Phoenix, Arizona in early 1988. In the following NBL sanctioned Grand Prix series he got a sixth in Memphis, Tennessee (the very first NBL F-1 race) and a second in Orlando, Florida.

== BMX and general press magazine interviews and articles ==
- "Almost a Legend in his own Time. Tinker Juarez: The Hollified Flash" Bicycle Motocross Action December 1976/January 1977 Vol.1 No.1 pg.27
- "The King of the Skateparks Tinker Juarez" Bicycle Motocross Action April 1980 Vol.5 No.4 pg.25. Pictorial of Tinker performing Vertical Freestyle at Lakewood Skatepark in Lakewood, California.
- "Interview: Tinker Juarez" BMX Action January 1983 Vol.8 No.1 pg.26

== BMX magazine covers ==
Bicycle Motocross News:

- May 1976 Vol.3 No.5 with Perry Kramer and an unidentified racer.

Minicycle/BMX Action & Super BMX:

- December 1978 Vol.5 No.12 (M/BMXA)

Bicycle Motocross Action & Go:

- April 1980 Vol.5 No.4
- May 1982 Vol.7 No.5 in last place behind Scott Clark, Harry Leary, Clint Miller Denny Davidow and Gregg Grubbs.

BMX Plus!:

- None

BMX Weekly & BMX B-Weekly: (British publication)

- January 14, 1983 Vol.3 Iss.2

Total BMX:

Bicycles and Dirt (ABA Publication):

- October 1983 Vol.2 No.1 ahead of Ronnie Anderson and Rob Medrano.

NBA World & NBmxA World (The official NBA/NBmxA membership publication under two names):

Bicycles Today & BMX Today (The official NBL membership publication under two names):

ABA Action, American BMXer, BMXer (The official ABA membership publication under three names):

- October 1983 Vol.6 No.10 (54) in third place on the outside behind Robert Fehd (472) and behind second place Shawn Texas (114) on the inside. Brian Patterson is in fourth directly behind Fehd.

USBA Racer (The official USBA membership publication):

== Mountain Bike (MTB) racing career ==
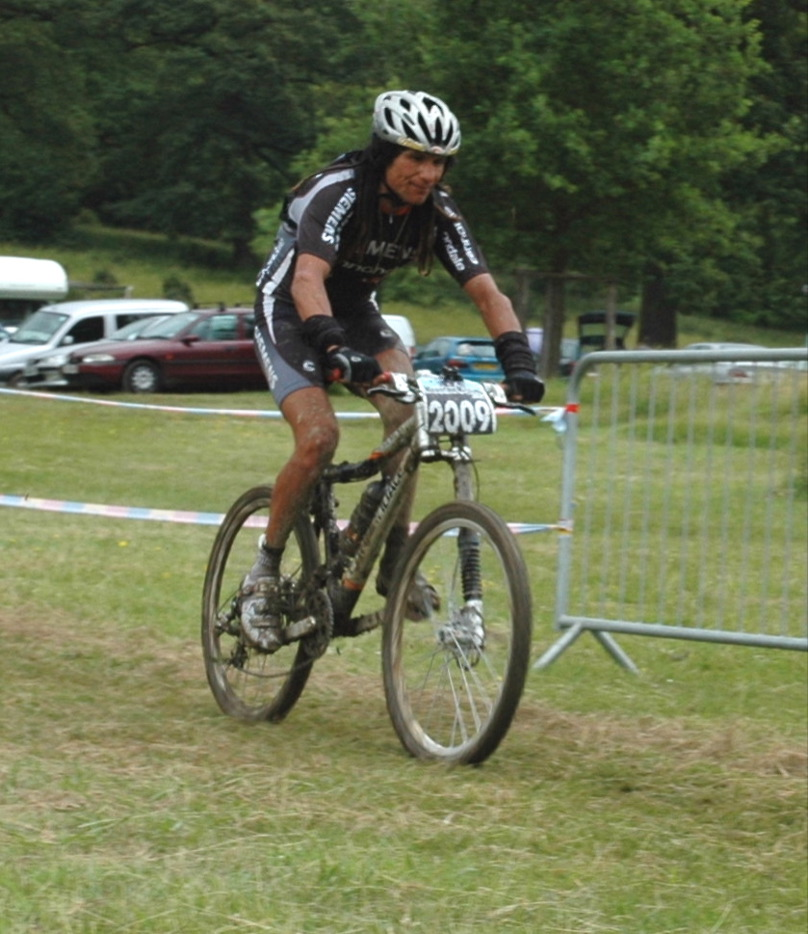

In 1986, Tinker made the switch from BMX to mountain biking. Since that time, Tinker has become a 3-time National Off-Road Bicycle Association (NORBA) cross-country (XC) champion and 4-time national champion in the 24-hour solo category. In 1996, he became one of the first to see the introduction of mountain biking as an Olympic sport and represent the United States. Tinker again represented the United States at the 2000 Summer Olympics. Started Racing: 1986 at 25 years of age.

Sub discipline: Cross Country (XC), Endurance

First race result:

Sanctioning Body:

Turned Professional: 1989

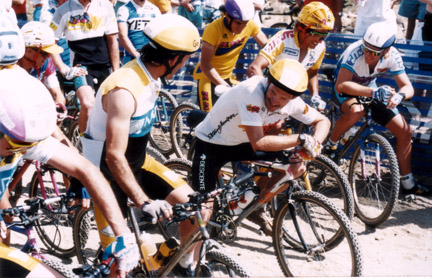
Ned Overend, John Tomac and Tinker Juarez Compete in the Cindy Whitehead Desert Classic, Palm Springs, California, 1989 - Photo by Patty Mooney

Retired:

=== Factory and corporate sponsors ===
==== Amateur ====
- General Bicycles (General Bicycle & Moped Company): March 1988 – 1989 Juarez would turn pro with this sponsor.

==== Professional ====
- General Bicycles: March 1988 – 1989
- Klein Bicycles: 1990–1993
- Volvo/Cannondale Bicycle Corporation: 1994-December 2002
- Siemens Mobile/Cannondale: January 28, 2003-December 2003
- Mona Vie: January 2004-December 2005
- Mona Vie/Cannondale: January 2006–October 2021
- Floyd's of Leadville: December 2021 – Present

=== MTB major career achievements ===
==== Professional ====
National Off-Road Bicycle Association (NORBA)

- 1994, 1995, 1998 United States NORBA Cross-Country Champion
- 2001 National Champion
- 2001, 2002, 2003, 2004 United States National Champion, 24-Hour Solo Category
- 1995 1st (Gold Medal) – Pan American Games
- 1998 1st – National Cycling Association Cross-Country Finals

=== Career MTB accolades ===
- Tinker Juarez appeared in two of the first instructional mountain biking videos ever produced: The Great Mountain Biking Video released in 1988, and "Ultimate Mountain Biking: Advanced Techniques & Winning Strategies" released in 1989 by New & Unique Videos of San Diego, California.
- Juarez was selected as a member of the 1996 and 2000 Summer Olympics.
- He was inducted into the Mountain Bike Hall of Fame in 2001.
- Cannondale awarded Tinker its 'Icon Award' in 2005 for his contribution to the sport.

== MTB magazine covers ==
Mountain Bike Action:

== Ultra-Endurance racing career ==
In 2005, Tinker began training for long-distance road racing events. He won the Heart of the South, which is a 500-mile (800 km) race, and finished second place at the 2005 edition of the Furnace Creek 508, a grueling 508-mile (818 km) course that covers 35,000 feet (11,000 m) of cumulative elevation gain and passes through Death Valley. His podium finishes qualified Tinker for the 2006 Race Across America (RAAM), the annual transcontinental bicycle race from the west coast to the east coast of the United States. He came in third in the Men's Solo Enduro division of the RAAM endurance road race on June 22, 2006, completing the three thousand mile race which started in 2006 from Oceanside, California and finishing in Atlantic City, New Jersey. His finishing time was 10 days, 22 hours and 21 minutes. Started Racing: 2005 at 44 years of age.

First race result:

Sanctioning Body:

Retired: Still Active.

=== Factory and corporate sponsors ===
Professional teams

- Siemens Mobile/Cannondale: January 28, 2003-December 2005
- Cannondale: January 2006–October 2021
- Floyd's of Leadville Racing: December 2021 – present

=== Ultra-Endurance road biking career achievements ===
- 3rd – Race Across America, Men's Solo - Enduro Category
- 1st – Heart of the South (500 miles)
- 2nd – Furnace Creak 508 (508 miles)
- 1st (Gold Medal) – Pan American Games (1995)

== Career MTB and Ultra-Endurance cycling achievements by year ==
1989

- 1st – NORBA Iron Horse Classic

1993

- 1st UCI Grundig World Cup win at Mont St. Anne, Quebec Canada

1994

- NCS National Cross-Country Champion
- Silver Medal – Mountain Bike World Championships (Cross Country)

1995

- NCS National Cross-Country Champion
- Gold Medal – Pan American Games

1996

- United States Olympic Team Member

1998

- NCS National Cross-Country Champion
- 1st – NCA Cross-Country Finals
- 2nd – NCS Cross-Country; Red Wing
- 3rd overall – Tour of the Rockies

1999

- 5th overall – NORBA Short Track
- 9th overall – NORBA Cross-Country

2000

- United States Olympic Team Member
- 5th – NORBA Cross-Country, Mt. Snow
- 7th – NORBA Cross-Country, Mammoth and Crystal Mountain
- 10th – World Cup XC, Mazatlan

2001

- NORBA National Champion, 24-Hour Solo Category
- Inductee – Mountain Bike Hall of Fame
- 1st – Gorge Games - 24 Hour Solo Race
- 1st – 24 Hours of Adrenaline - Laguna Seca
- 1st – 24 Hour US National Championships
- 5th – Mount Snow NORBA Cross Country Finals
- 6th – Deer Valley NORBA Cross Country Finals

2002

- NORBA National Champion, 24-Hour Solo Category
- 24 Hour National Champion
- 1st – Gorge Games - 24 Hour Solo Race
- 1st – 24 Hours of Adrenaline - Winter Park
- 1st – 24 Hours of Adrenaline - Laguna Seca
- 1st – 24 Hours of 9 Mile
- 1st – 24 Hours in the Old Pueblo

2003

- NORBA National Champion, 24-Hour Solo Category
- 1st – Solo 24 hours of Laguna Seca (National Championship)
- 1st – Solo 24 Hours in the Old Pueblo
- 1st – Solo 24 hours of Temecula
- 1st – Solo 24 hours of Moab, Utah
- 1st – Epic 75 at Big Bear
- 1st – Solo 12 hours of Humboldt
- 2nd – Solo 12 hours of Razorback
- 1st – Solo 12 horas MTB Sampa Bikers (Itupeva, São Paulo, Brazil)
- 2nd – Solo 24 hours of Mtn Whistle (World Championships)

2004

- NORBA National Champion, 24-Hour Solo Category
- 2nd – Solo 24 Hours in the Old Pueblo
- 3rd overall (1st, masters) – La Ruta de los Conquistadores (Costa Rica)

2005

- NORBA National Champion, 24-Hour Solo Category
- 1st – Heart of the South (500 mile road race)
- 2nd – Furnace Creak 508 (508 mile road race)
- 1st – Solo 24 Hours of Mountain Mayhem (Eastnor, England)
- 1st – Solo 24 hours of Temecula (Temecula, California)
- 1st – Solo 24 Hours of Mohican Wilderness (Glenmont, Ohio)
- 1st – Solo 12 hours of Razorback (Reddick, Florida)
- 3rd – Solo 12 hours of Humboldt
- 1st – Solo 12 Horas MTB Sampa Bikers (Itupeva, São Paulo, Brazil)

2006

- 3rd – Race Across America, Men's Solo - Enduro Category
- 1st – Solo 24 Hours in the Old Pueblo

2007

- 3rd – Wilderness 101 Endurance Mt. bike race

2009

- 1st – Tahoe Sierra 100 (Soda Springs, California)

2010

- 1st – Master world Championship, Camboriu, Brazil

2018

- 1st – Maah Daah Hey 100 (Medora, North Dakota)

2019

- 1st – Maah Daah Hey 100 (Medora, North Dakota)

2022

- 1st – Maah Daah Hey 100 (Medora, North Dakota)

2026

- 1st – Master world Championship, Nevados de Chillán, Chile
