= Shawn Texas =

American bicycle motocross rider (born 1963)

Personal information
- Full name: Shawn Patrick Texas
- Nickname: "Big"
- Born: September 8, 1963 (age 63) Los Angeles, California, United States
- Height: 1.9 m (6 ft 3 in)
- Weight: 90.7 kg (200 lb)

Cycling career
- Sport: Cycling
- Current team: Retired
- Discipline: Bicycle Motocross (BMX)
- Role: Racer
- Rider type: Off Road

Amateur teams
- 1979: Bicycles N Stuff
- 1979-1980: Hidden Valley Schwinn
- 1980-1982: Cal Bike

Professional teams
- 1982-1983: O'Neal
- 1983: Gruenert Design Racing
- 1983-1984: Pro Neck
- 1985: Basset Racing
- 1985-1986: CW Racing
- 1986: MBK
- 1987-1988: Eagle Snacks
- 1988-1989: White Bear
- 1989: Boss Racing Products
- 1989-1990: AXO/Ralph's Bicycles
- 1990-1994: Race Tech Products
- 1994: Roost America
- 1998: Power Source

Shawn Patrick Texas (born September 8, 1963) was an American professional "Old School" Bicycle Motocross (BMX) racer whose prime competitive years were from (1983–1987)

== Racing career milestones ==
Note: Professional first are on the national level unless otherwise indicated.

Started Racing: Early August 1977 at 13 years of age. His friend took him to a local track in Lakeside, California. He didn't have his own race bike, so he raced his friends. He got his own bike for his 14th birthday on September 8, 1977.

Sanctioning Body: ()

First race result: Third place.

First win (local):

First race bicycle:

Home sanctioning body district(s):

First sponsor: Bicycles N' Stuff 1979.

First national win:

Turned Professional: Mid 1982 at 18 years of age.

First Professional race result: Third in Pro class at the World Wide BMX Association (WWBMXA) Supernationals on June 6, 1982 in Rancho San Diego, California. The WWBMXA didn't have a two tier Senior/Junior pro class like the NBL or the ABA. As a result he raced at least two Senior pros; Harry Leary, who won the event, and Clint Miller who came in second. However, Texas was still considered a junior pro in the ABA and the NBL and raced that class at those events.

First Professional win: In "A" Pro at the American Bicycle Association (ABA) Supernationals in Lake Elsinore, California on January 23, 1983. He won US$450, the equivalent to US$929.37 in 2007 (Cost of Living Calculator)

First Junior Men Pro* race result: Second Place in "A" Pro at the ABA Fall Nationals in Lancaster, California on October 17, 1982. He won US$250 (US$532.90 in 2007) Technically speaking it could be said his first junior pro race result was at the WWBMXA Supernationals in June 1982 but the WWBMXA did not have a two tier pro system unlike the NBL and the ABA. At least two top level senior pro racers raced in Texas's class but the majority of the racers in that class were junior pros.

First Junior Men Pro win: See "First Professional win"

First Senior Men Pro** race result: Did not make main at the 1983 Mile High Nationals in Longmont, Colorado on July 4, 1983

First Senior Men Pro win: In "AA" pro at the ABA Fall Nationals in Bargaintown, New Jersey on August 28, 1983. He won US$320, the equivalent to US$660.88 in 2007.

Retired:

Height & weight at height of her career (1986): Ht:6'2" Wt:195 lbs.

=== Career factory and major bike shop sponsors ===
Note: This listing only denotes the racer's primary sponsors. At any given time a racer could have numerous ever changing co-sponsors. Primary sponsorships can be verified by BMX press coverage and sponsor's advertisements at the time in question. When possible exact dates are used.

==== Amateur ====
- Bicycles N' Stuff: 1979.
- Hidden Valley Schwinn: 1979-1980
- Cal Bike: 1980-Early 1982

==== Professional ====
- O'Neal: 1982-May 1983
- Gruenert Design Racing: May 1983-September 1, 1983
- Pro Neck: September 1, 1983-December 1984. He signed with Pro Neck right after winning the B Pro Main at the 1983 NBL Grand Nationals in Nashville, Tennessee. Pro Neck dropped its race team at the end of the 1984 season.
- Bassett Racing: Early April 1985-Early July 1985. Texas would be unsponsored for almost the entire summer of 1985 after Bassett went out of business.
- CW (Custom Works) Racing: October 1985-September 21, 1986. Texas was dropped from CW Racing after the weekend of the ABA Freedomnationls. According to BMX Plus!, CW claimed that Texas's racing was not up to par. Note: at the time there was no written contract between Texas and CW Racing. BMX Action reported that Shawn Texas received a letter from CW telling him that among the reasons he was let go was that he didn't wear his cosponsor's goggles and Texas was dissatisfied with CW's products. Texas confirmed the letter but contested the reasons:
  "I didn't wear my goggles in Oregon because I didn't have any. I wore them on tour after Roger (Worsham) said something about it...Man, I did everything he ever told me to do!"

He continued:

"I was NEVER dissatisfied with their products. I told Rog that I'd like a frame with a little bit steeper head tube, and he said, 'fine.' Everything was cool. I wanted them to make my own frame with my signature on it because they could sell a bunch of 'em and I'd get my name on something. But Rog says he doesn't want to put anybody's name on products after what happened with Pete (Loncarevich). I said, 'fine.' Next thing I know... I got this letter in the mail telling me I was off the team!"---BMX Action February 1987

After CW, with an exception of a brief sponsorship with MBK in France, Texas did not have a sponsor for an extended period of time before he was picked up by Eagle Snacks. In the meantime he had listed "Team Jesus" as his "sponsor". Like fellow pro racers Eric Rupe and Mike Miranda, Shawn Texas is a born again Christian. Side Note: "CW" never stood for "Coast Wheels" as it is widely thought. Coast Wheels was a bike shop that Roger Worsham owned. Custom Works was a completely different and independent company. This is in contrast with JMC (Jim Melton Cyclery) which did start out as a bicycle shop and then began manufacturing its own BMX components including entire bicycles.

- Motobecane (MBK): November 22–23, 1986. This was a one weekend sponsorship in France for the Bicross/Yop King of Bercy championship race in Bercy, France. It was not a permanent position nor was it meant to be.
- Eagle Snacks: February 21, 1987-December 1987. Texas joined the Eagle Snacks team the day of the NBL North Carolina National. Texas was let go by Eagle snacks because, according to the team manager Mark Fouler "...it was too expensive.." and they went with an all amateur team. The parting was on mutual good terms. Texas was unsponsored for five months after he left Eagle Snacks.
- White Bear: May 1988-March 1989
- Boss Racing Products July 1989-August 1989 Texas was briefly on Boss after leaving White Bear.
- AXO/Ralph's Bicycles: August 1989-Early 1990
- Race Tech Products: Mid 1990-1994
- Roost America: 1994
- Power Source: 1998

=== Career bicycle motocross titles ===
Note: Listed are District, State/Provincial/Department, Regional, National, and International titles in italics. "Defunct" refers to the fact of that sanctioning body in question no longer existing at the start of the racer's career or at that stage of his/her career. Depending on point totals of individual racers, winners of Grand Nationals do not necessarily win National titles. Series and one off Championships are also listed in block.

==== Amateur ====
National Bicycle Association (NBA)

National Bicycle League (NBL)

- 1983 "B" Pro Grandnational Champion

American Bicycle Association (ABA)

United States Bicycle Motocross Association (USBA)

- None

Fédération Internationale Amateur de Cyclisme (FIAC)*

- None

International Bicycle Motocross Federation (IBMXF)*

- None

Union Cycliste Internationale (UCI)*

- None

*See note in professional section

==== Professional ====
National Bicycle Association (NBA)

- None

National Bicycle League (NBL)

- 1986 Pro Cruiser Murray World Cup V Champion
- 1987 Pro Cruiser Grandnational Champion

American Bicycle Association (ABA)

United States Bicycle Motocross Association (USBA)

- 1984 7-UP World Championship Unlimited Pro Champion

International Bicycle Motocross Federation (IBMXF)*

Fédération Internationale Amateur de Cyclisme (FIAC)*

- None (FIAC did not have a strictly professional division during its existence) (defunct).

Union Cycliste Internationale (UCI)*

*Note: Beginning in 1991 the IBMXF and FIAC had been holding joint World Championship events as a transitional phase in merging which began in earnest in 1993. Beginning with the 1996 season the IBMXF and FIAC completed the merger and both ceased to exist as independent entities being integrated into the UCI. Beginning with the 1997 World Championships held in Brighton, England the UCI would officially hold and sanction BMX World Championships and with it inherited all precedents, records, streaks, etc. from both the IBMXF and FIAC.
Pro Invitationals and Series Championships

- 1984 Tijauna BMX Cup Championship Pro Champion†

†The Tijuana BMX Cup was a special promotional race that was held in Tijuana, Mexico. The race was heavily promoted by both individual promoters and the State Secretary of Tourism of Baja California. It featured a track designed by pro racer Eddy King. The raced was sanctioned by the International Cycling Organization (ICO) and the BMX Association (BMXA). The BMXA was an old but small and local BMX sanctioning body headquartered in San Diego, California. Both the ABA and the NBL had declined to sanction the event. Despite heavy promotion the event was poorly attended including by most top name pros. Shawn Texas, Eddy King, Donny Atherton, Rod Beckering, Toby Henderson and Denny Davidow were the only recognizable names to race in the pro classes.

- 1986 Orange YMCA BMX Pro Series Champion

The YMCA BMX Pro Series Championship was a private four race pro series held at the Orange YMCA BMX race track in Orange, California on four consecutive Wednesdays in February and March 1986. It was sponsored by MRC, Mike Redman Concepts. It was highly successful and well attended by many top ranked pros despite the relatively low prize purse of US$150 ($281.52 in 2007 Cost of Living Calculator) plus 100 percent payback with a US$200 (US$375.36 2007) bonus for the top three series finishers. It did however, have an unusually low entrance fee of $10 ($18.77 2007) for the pros per race.

=== BMX product lines ===
- 1989 White Bear Shawn Texas T-Bone Pro Special Limited Edition Frame and fork set

Product evaluation:

=== Significant injuries ===
- Rebroke finger at the ABA GT Supernationals on January 29, 1984 in Los Angeles, California. He went over a berm at high speed.

=== Miscellaneous ===
- Shawn Texas received a one-month suspension from racing at the 1984 NBL Las Vegas, Nevada National after he deliberately collided with Frank Post after getting squeezed off the track at a step jump in the second straight. Texas, feeling that the action was deliberate on Post's part, cut across the infield and rammed Post perpendicular to him (called a "T-Bone" or "center punch") in the second turn. Mutual shouting and pushing ensued. The NBL track officials ruled that Frank Post would be disqualified for the day, receiving no money or points for that day for fighting physically with Texas (it is illegal to fight even in retaliation). The same for Texas in addition to the one-month suspension for instigating the altercation. According to BMX Plus! Frank Post admitted that he moved over on Texas in the second turn deliberately so he would have to worry about Texas diving in on the inside and up into Post, cutting him off as they went into turn three.
- Shawn Texas received a suspension from racing for punching fellow racer Rick Palmer after a collision at the ABA's Gilley's Nationals on March 7, 1987 day 1. Rick Palmer tried to pass Texas in the second turn but was unsuccessful and both went down after Palmer collided with Texas. Texas was in third at the time in the third and final run of the "AA" pro mains and would have most likely won the entire event if he held his third position. In anger he punched Palmer in the chin who retaliated with a punch to Texas's lip. Clayton John, President of the ABA, suspended them both for one day, preventing them from racing the second day of the Gilley's National on Sunday. This incident and previous incidents of fighting in the pro ranks caused the ABA to initiate new rules. The first incident of fighting results in a one-day suspension and a warning, the second a four-month suspension automatically.

== BMX press magazine interviews and articles ==
- "Shawn Texas" BMX Plus! September 1983 Vol.6 No.9 pg.36
- "Big Time Texas" Bicycles and Dirt February 1984 Vol.2 No.5 pg.29
- "Shawn Texas" BMX Action November 1984 Vol.9 No.11 pg.20. One of five impromptu interviews of pro racers at the 1984 NBL North Park Pittsburgh, Pennsylvania National including Greg Grubbs, Mike Poulson, Tommy Brackens and John Crews.
- "Shawn Texas" BMX Plus! October 1986 Vol.9 No.10 pg.46
- "Shawn Texas" BMX Action October 1986 Vol.11 No.10 pg.64

== BMX magazine covers ==
Note: (defunct) denotes that the magazine was out of business before the career of the racer started.

Bicycle Motocross News:

- None

Minicycle/BMX Action & Super BMX:

- Super BMX & Freestyle August 1987 Vol.14 No.8 in right image and freestyler Chris Roth in left image. Cartoon character "Max to the Max" in top corner insert.

Bicycle Motocross Action & Go:

BMX Plus!:

- November 1984 Vol.7 No.11 (09) ahead of Greg Hill in second and John Crews (43) in third. In insets Mike Franze (bottom) and freestyler Eddie Fiola (top)
- August 1986 Vol.9 No.8 (falling) in insert slightly behind Scott Clark, ahead of Gary Ellis and directly ahead of an unidentified racer. Main image freestyler Ron Wilkerson.
- July 1987 Vol.10 No.7 In rectangle insert (5) behind Tommy Brackens (2) ahead of Pete Loncarevich (15) Charles Townsend (9) and two unidentifieds (11) and (6). In triangle insert Harry Leary (1) ahead of Scott Towne (70) and Robby Rupe. In top circle insert freestyler Mike Dominguez. Main image: freestyler Matt Hoffman.

Total BMX:

Bicycles and Dirt:

Snap BMX Magazine & Transworld BMX:

BMX World:

Moto Mag:

NBA World & NBmxA (The official NBA/NBmxA publication):

Bicycles Today & BMX Today (The official publication of the NBL under two different names):

ABA Action, American BMXer, BMXer (The official publication of the ABA under three different names):

- October 1983 Vol.6 No.10 (114)(54) in second place on the inside behind Robert Fehd (472) and the leading third placeTinker Juarez (54) on the inside. Brian Patterson is in fourth directly behind Fehd.
- November 1983 Vol.6 No.11
- November 1986 Vol.8 No.10 (10) ahead of Todd Slavik (31) in second, Pete Loncarevich (2) in third, Eric Rupe in fourth, Eddy King (6) in fifth, Harry Leary in sixth, unidentified racer (86) in seventh and Robert Fehd (3) in eighth.

USBA Racer (The official USBA publication):
