= Mike Miranda (BMX rider) =

American bicycle motocross rider (born 1963)

Personal information
- Full name: Fredrick Michael Felty
- Nickname: "Hollywood"
- Born: November 15, 1963 (age 62) Jacksonville, Florida, United States

Cycling career
- Sport: Cycling
- Current team: Retired
- Discipline: Bicycle Motocross (BMX)
- Role: Racer
- Rider type: Off Road

Amateur teams
- 1978: Steady Pedaler Bike Shop
- 1978–1980: RRS
- 1981–1982: CW Racing

Professional teams
- 1982–1983: CW Racing
- 1984: Torker BMX
- 1984–1986: Hutch Hi-Performance BMX
- 1987: Jamis Cycles
- 1987: CW Racing
- 1987–1988: CW/Revcore/Shadow
- 1988–1989: Free Agent/Vision Street Wear

Major wins
- 1984 20" Murray World Cup III Champion

Michael Felty formerly Miguel Juan Miranda (born November 15, 1963) is a former American "Old School" professional Bicycle Motocross (BMX) racer whose prime competitive years were from 1981 to 1986. His previous surname which he is still widely and most familiarly known by, "Miranda", was his stepfather's name. There seem to be two stories on how he got his nickname "Hollywood". It was either coined by Bicycle Motocross Action (BMXA) editor Steve Giberson because he liked to "show off"; or he had pretty much gave himself the moniker by having a name sticker under the visor of his helmet reading "My name is Hollywood", which was noticed at the 1981 NBA Roncho Nationals. Here is how he tells it in this 1982 quote:

This guy I know that races motorcycles in Southern California is a real jerk. Every time you did something stupid, we would call you by his last name. 'You're such a Smith.' And at the Super Bowl of Motocross three years ago (in 1979), he raced and had "Hollywood" on the back of his jersey. From then on, whenever you did something stupid, we would say: 'You're such a Hollywood'. It was meant as a putdown but now I guess it's compliment. I just tell people that they call me that because I like to show off. Steve Giberson started it.
– Mike Miranda Super BMX April 1983.

Much like fellow pro racers Eric Rupe and Shawn Texas, he was a born again Christian who credited much of his success to God.

Mike Hollywood Miranda now runs the new updated CW Racing https://web.archive.org/web/20110130223520/http://www.cw-racing.com/ He is using the old school retro style 4130 cromo frame and fork. CW has been widely popular by demand of the classic style of BMX.

Mike Miranda had "Miranda Mountain" named after him at the Corona-Norco YMCA BMX track. It was a 180 degree table-top jump/turn. The young guys loved to see him show off on Miranda Mountain.

== Racing career milestones ==
Note: Professional first are on the national level unless otherwise indicated.

Started Racing: September or October 1977 at 13 years old in "Six Grade Class". His first race was at a district school race that was scheduled to meet once a month on a Saturday at Corona Raceway in Corona, California. Every school in his district including his Junior High School in Riverside, California, would participate. The racers raced in their actual grade level and not in a BMX age class. There were no proficiency classes like "Novice" and "Expert". For this reason and that his parents did not want him to get a motorcycle is the reason Mike Miranda started in BMX.

Sanctioning Body: Riverside School District.

First race result: Unknown. "I won a lot". However, this statement is contradicted by a factoid in the BMX Plus! 1988 Calendar. According it Mike Miranda didn't win his first trophy, let alone win, until February 7, 1978, four months after he started racing.

First win (local): See above, unknown.

First sponsor: Steady Pedaler Bike Shop.

First national win: Never won an expert class division while an amateur

Turned Professional: February 15, 1982, at age 18 the day after the American Bicycle Association (ABA)'s Winter Nationals in Chandler, Arizona.

First Professional race result: Fifth place in "A" pro on February 15, 1982, the day after the ABA Winter Nationals at the post race.".

First Professional win: In "B" Pro at the National Bicycle League (NBL) national in Bakersfield, California, on May 30, 1982.

First Junior Pro* race result: See above.

First Junior Pro** win: See above.

First Senior Pro race result: First place in "A" Pro at the National Bicycle League (NBL)/International BMX Federation (IBMXF) Magic Mountain Grand Prix of the United States on October 31, 1982, in Valencia, California. He won US$2,000. the equivalent to US$4,263.21 in 2007 (Cost of Living Calculator). He moved himself up from "B" pro to "A" Level he could have won nine more "B" division races before NBL rule required him to graduate to "A" division. The NBL management went along with his decision since he was doing very well in the "B" pro class at the time it seemed unfair to the other "B" level competitors. Miranda had 11 "B" pro wins with the NBL at the time in addition to a further four junior "A" pro wins with the ABA.

First Senior Pro win: See above.

Retired: Effectively April 3, 1989, in Orlando, Florida, due to a severe back injury. It was a career ender.

Height & weight at height of his career ():

*In the NBL "B" Pro/Super Class/"A" pro depending on the era; in the ABA "A" pro.
**In the NBL "A" Pro/"Elite Men"; in the ABA "AA" pro.

=== Career factory and major bike shop sponsors ===
Note: This listing only denotes the racer's primary sponsors. At any given time a racer could have numerous ever changing co-sponsors. Primary sponsorships can be verified by BMX press coverage and sponsor's advertisements at the time in question. When possible exact dates are given.

==== Amateur ====
- Steady Pedaler Bike Shop: 1978
- RRS (Riverside Redlands Schwinn): 1978-December 1980
- CW (Custom Works) Racing: January 1981-December 1983. Mike Miranda will turn pro with this sponsor.

==== Professional ====
- CW Racing: January 1981-December 1983. "CW" stood for "Coast Wheels" and later became Custom Works. This is in contrast with JMC (Jim Melton Cyclery) which did start out as a bicycle shop and then began manufacturing its own BMX components including entire bicycles. He left CW because he was essentially tired with being with the same sponsor since almost the beginning of his racing career. Also his friendship with the owner Roger Worsham became more distant and the growth of the company gave it a less than an intimate feel. He cited these reasons for his loss of motivation. Pro Pete Loncarevich replaced him.
- Torker BMX: January 1984–September 14, 1984. He joined Torker to be a teammate with his best friend and fellow pro racer Tommy Brackens who joined Torker a couple of months before. He became roommates with Brackens in January 1984 sharing a two bedroom apartment in Fullerton, California, right above the apartment Torker Team Manager Mike McLaughlin and Max rider representative "Magoo" McGruther lived in. Miranda and Brackens also set up a membership in a health spa to train together. He left Torker because he had alleged irreconcilable difference with then Torker team manager Steve Johnson. As it turned out, Torker would go bankrupt and let its entire team effort go two months after Miranda's departure.
- Hutch Hi-Performance BMX: September 15, 1984 – early November 1986. Left Hutch due to its inability to pay his salary because of the company's financial difficulties. including Hutch filing for Chapter 11 bankruptcy This was a major disappointment to Mr. Miranda and false promises allegedly made by the management of Hutch caused him enough disillusionment with the BMX industry to take a two-year hiatus from racing. Apparently one of those false promises was the company's alleged failure to pay Miranda's salary and contingencies despite the hard work Miranda put into racing but also ancillary things to promote the company:
  I went to a whole lot of races. I did good that year - in '86. I won NORA Cup - which is by far the biggest thing that's ever happened to me in BMX. I went on tour-drove every mile in the motor home. Watched the kids. Did the clinics. Bent over backwards for Hutch in every way I could. All I did was eat, breathe, and live Hutch BMX. And he kept telling me, 'The check's in the mail. Check's in the mail.' And by the time it rolled around, it was four months behind, and that's when he let me know there wasn't going to be any check. No contingencies. No nothing. He just said 'Sorry.' I understand - that's business, and it's my fault not watching out for myself. Maybe putting too much trust in my friends. It happened and that was it. I didn't want to do it anymore. I didn't want to get burned again. – Mike Miranda BMX Action June 1986
- Jamis Cycles: January 1987-March 1987. In a bike test for Super BMX & Freestyle Mike Miranda was product testing a Jamis bicycle (which was published in the January 1987 issue). He liked the bicycle so much he initiated talks with Jamis for sponsorship after his sponsorship with Hutch Hi-Performance ended. Despite this however, he apparently wasn't happy due to the after effects of his sponsorship with Hutch BMX.
  I got an offer from Jamis.....but I just didn't want to ride anymore. I didn't have whatever it takes to say yes and do it again, I couldn't get up in the morning and train. So I got a job. Started working, took up golf - put a bunch of different things in my life that would take up the space that BMX had filled – BMX Action June 1989
- CW Racing: Early April 1987-December 1987. Mike Miranda announced what was effectively his semi-retirement from competitive racing to take the position of the CW freestyle team manager. He raced occasionally in the pro class basically for fun.
- CW/Revcore/Shadow: December 1987-September 1988. Revcore/Shadow was owned by the same man who started and own its elder sister company CW Racing: Roger Worsham. Later Shadow was dissolved and the Company was left with only the CW and Revcore divisions.
- Free Agent/Vision Street Wear: September 1988 – June 1990. Vision Street Wear and Free Agent joined the trend of two or more companies sponsoring the same race team to spread the financial burden. Mike Miranda left Vision Street Wear to head GT (Gary Turner) Bicycles's Juvenile Promotions Program.

=== Career bicycle motocross titles ===
Note: Listed are District, State/Provincial/Department, Regional, National, and International titles in italics. "Defunct" refers to the fact of that sanctioning body in question no longer existing at the start of the racer's career or at that stage of his/her career. Depending on point totals of individual racers, winners of Grand Nationals do not necessarily win National titles. Series and one off Championships are also listed in block.

==== Amateur ====
National Bicycle Association (NBA)

National Bicycle League (NBL)

- None

American Bicycle Association (ABA)

- None

International Bicycle Motocross Federation (IBMXF)

- None

==== Professional ====
National Bicycle Association (NBA)

- None

National Bicycle League (NBL)

- 1982 "B" Pro Grandnational Champion

American Bicycle Association (ABA)

- 1984 Arizona State Pro Champion

United States Bicycle Motocross Association (USBA)

- None

International Bicycle Motocross Federation (IBMXF)

- 1984 20" Class Pro Murray World Cup III Champion

Special races, Invitationals and Pro Series Championships

=== BMX Product lines ===
- 1984 Hutch "The Hollywood Series" frame and fork set and complete bicycles.

Product Evaluations:

BMX Action April 1985 Vol.10 No.4 pg.38 BMX Action test and evaluation.

=== Notable accolades ===
- He was the first "B" pro to win the Pro Trophy/Award class at the NBL national in Lawrenceville, New Jersey, in April 1982.
- He is the 1986 Winner of Bicycle Motocross Action (BMXA) magazine's Number One Racer Award (NORA) Cup. He won with 12.02% or 723 out of the 6,017 votes cast. He beat second place and three consecutive time NORA winner Greg Hill by three votes. Hill received 11.97% and Tommy Brackens 11.52% of the votes cast. Miranda also won an RCA Video Cassette Recorder (VCR) as a prize. Neither Hill nor his loved ones voted at all for the 1986 NORA Cup balloting. Considering that Hill lost by three votes, it might have tipped the balance in Hill's favor:
  "Yeah I didn't vote. My wife didn't and neither did my mom and dad. If we would've voted, then I guess, I would've won (laughter). ---Greg Hill May 1986 BMX Action

What makes Miranda's victory such a stand out is that Miranda did not win a major race event up to that point in 1985 when the voting took place.

- He had speaking and stunt roles (as in terms of simulated crashes, not freestyle) in the 1986 movie Rad.
- He was a camp counselor ant the famed Woodward Gymnastics and BMX camp in Woodward, Pennsylvania, following in the path laid by Bobby Encinas and Perry Kramer of giving back to the kids what he learned from BMX.
- He is a 1992 inductee of the ABA BMX Hall of Fame.

=== Significant injuries ===
- Broke a hand at the 1983 East Coast National in Bargaintown, New Jersey. Laid up for approximately one month.
- Injured ankle sometime during August 1985
- Broke jaw while practicing in the street jumping a curb on his bicycle approximately September 1985.
- Suffered a compression fracture of the spine during the NBL's Orlando, Florida, national on April 3, 1989. He misjudged the height of a jump and the front wheel clipped the peak of the mogul sending him over the bars and onto his head It was a career-ending injury. However, Miranda didn't know of the full extent of his injury until he had his back examined after weeks of persistent back pain. Both BMX Plus! and Mike Miranda himself state it was an ABA race, but there was no ABA national scheduled in Florida that year. However, there was one NBL national held in Florida in April before BMX Plus! made note of Miranda's injury in its July 1989 issue.
- A jet ski accident during his 20s severed the tip of his right middle finger, leaving him with no fingernail permanently.
- An unknown accident almost completely severed his left ear off, but with medical attention it was reattached and remains permanently deformed.

=== Racing habits and traits ===
- He had a penchant for promoting pink as a desirable color for males in BMX racing despite it being traditionally associated with females. He went as far as to have a uniform in pink and white colors during his time with Hutch Hi-Performance BMX beginning in early 1985. He was probably the major reason for the approximately three-year (1985–1988) fad of male BMXers, both racers and in particular freestylist wearing neon pink uniforms or having pink and another bright colors like light purple, lavender and lime green incorporated in uniforms bicycle components including frames handlebars and accessories including tires. The highly respected pro racer Greg Hill, who was sponsored by his own company Greg Hill Products (GHP) at the time also gave the neon color trend legitimacy when he too used the color pink in his GHP uniform livery also beginning in early 1985.
- His racing was prone to hot and cold streaks. In 1982 he broke onto the professional BMX stage by his near complete dominance of the junior pro class ("B" pro in the NBL, "A" pro in the ABA) by going almost undefeated on the junior level. He transferred himself with the NBL's permission up to the Senior division. He did almost as well in the Senior pro class ("A" pro in the NBL, "AA" pro in the ABA), beating such established veteran racers on a regular basis like Stu Thomsen and Anthony Sewell. This after never winning the expert class at a national during his amateur career. Then he went into a sophomore slump in 1983. In 1984 he was hot again but by 1985 his career was in the doldrums. He did not win a major race in any association (NBL, ABA, United States BMX Association (USBA)) during that year. This is compared to with his winning four races in 1984, the same number as Tommy Brackens and Stu Thomsen won that year.
- He was disorderly when he came to home organization, to which his room was in complete disarray with his clothes, bicycle equipment, Guitar case, and other items strewn about

== Post BMX career ==
- After an almost 20-year absence from BMX, he is currently a Cross Country Mountain Biker in the 40 and over class.
- As of 2011, Mike Felty lives in Seal Beach, California.
- He has 2 children, including a son, David, and a daughter named Miranda who he named in remembrance to his original last name given by his step-father, Benjamin Miranda.
- He is an avid surfer and sailer.
- He was married in his late twenties to Kelly Felty (née Breiholz) with whom he had his two children, David and Miranda. After their divorce and remarriages he is currently married to his wife Sierra Felty with whom he has two stepsons, Ethan and Devan.
- He and his wife Sierra have two Boston Terriers named Elvis and Priscilla.
- He remains close friends with fellow "old school" BMX rider Eric Carter

== BMX magazine covers ==
Bicycle Motocross News:

- None

Minicycle/BMX Action & Super BMX:

- October 1981 Vol.8 No.10 (SBMX)
- February 1983 Vol.10 No.2 celebrity actor John Stamos in separate inset.(SBMX)
- October 1984 Vol.11 No.10 in insert. In separate insert Freestyler Mike Dominquez. Main image: Richie Anderson, Gary Ellis & other racers.

Bicycle Motocross Action & Go:

- September 1984 Vol.9 No.9. (BMXA)
- July 1985 Vol.10 No.7 in insert with Eric Rupe leading. Brad Birdwell main image. (BMXA)
- October 1985 Vol.10 No.10. (BMXA)
- June 1989 Vol.14 No.6. Harry Leary riding a mountain bike and in mountain biking uniform in insert. (BMXA)

BMX Plus!:

- November 1983 Vol. No.10* with inserts David Ruz & Andy Sutalo; Jim Comeau.
- August 1984 Vol.7 No.8 with Toby Henderson, Clint Miller & freestyler Woody Itson in separate inserts.
- October 1984 Vol.7 No.10 in insert behind Ronnie Anderson and ahead of Stu Thomsen. Eddie Fiola main image.
- July 1985 Vol.8 No.7 in insert with Eddy King (6). Main image freestyler Ron Wilkerson.
- August 1985 Vol.8 No.8 with Scott Clark, Pete Loncarevich, Harry Leary, Robert Fehd and Billy Griggs in separate inserts and a group shot on a starting gate.
- February 1986 Vol.9 No.2 ahead of Pete Loncarevich. Inset Sidehackers Perez & Garrido.
- February 1987 Vol.10 No.2 (5) in insert ahead of Eddy King (6) and Pete Loncarevich (2), In separate insert top freestyler Martin Aparijo frame standing on MX motorcycle. Main Image: Freestyler Rich Sigur.
- July 1989 Vol.12 No.7 In top insert Lake Jumping with black shorts right with Freestyler Dave Voelker in redshorts left with spectators. in middle insert freestyler Woody Itson with models Liz Corey (sitting on ground) and Danielle Shields. Billy Griggs is main image.
- September 1989 Vol.12 No.9. Jumping over a powersliding Galen Starlin.

*Due to a change of ownership, BMX Plus! did not publish a May issue in 1983.

BiCross Magazine (French Publication):

- May 1984 No.32
- January 1986 No.40

Total BMX

Movies (RAD)

Bicycles and Dirt (ABA Publication):

NBA World & NBmxA World (The official NBA/NBmxA membership publication):

Bicycles Today & BMX Today (The official NBL membership publication under two names):

ABA Action, American BMXer, BMXer (The official ABA membership publication under three names):

USBA Racer (The official USBA membership publication):

== BMX press magazine interviews and articles ==
- "Mike Miranda" BMX Plus! January 1983 Vol.6 No.1 pg.47 Sidebar article.
- "Hollywood Mike Miranda" Super BMX April 1983 Vol.10 No.4 pg.10 Long indepth interview.
- "Mike Miranda" BMX Plus! November 1983 Vol.6 No.10* pg.44
- "Hollywood Finds A Home" American BMXer October 1984 Vol.7 No.9 pg.23
- "Mike 'Hollywood' Miranda: Racing for Religion" BMX Bi-Weekly July 5-July 18, 1984, Vol.4 Iss.13 pg.32 British Publication.
- "Mike Miranda" BMX Plus! October 1984 Vol.7 No.10 pg.45 He emphasized his religious feelings in this interview.
- "The New Torker" Super BMX November 1984 Vol.11 No.11 pg.22. Short article about Miranda on Torker with his teammates similarly profiled.
- "World's Messiest Room?" BMX Plus! December 1984 Vol.7 No.12 pg.16. Short "Inside Scoop" humorous article on the living space hygiene of Mike Miranda.
- "Shuckin', Jivin', and Jokin' with Hollywood Mike Miranda" BMX Action April 1985 Vol.10 No.4 pg.42
- "Mike Miranda: Flyin' High Again" BMX Action July 1986 Vol.11 No.7 pg.22
- "On the Cover: Mike Miranda" BMX Action June 1989 Vol.14 No.6 pg.70

*Due to a change of ownership, BMX Plus! did not publish a May issue in 1983.
