= Pete Loncarevich =

American BMX racer (born 1966)

Personal information
- Full name: Peter Loncarevich
- Nickname: "Pistol Pete"
- Born: April 8, 1966 (age 60) Lake Forest, California, U.S.
- Height: 6 ft 1 in (1.85 m)
- Weight: 180–195 lb (82–88 kg)

Cycling career
- Sport: Cycling
- Current team: Retired
- Disciplines: Bicycle motocross (BMX); Mountain bike racing (MTB)
- Role: Racer
- Rider type: Off Road

Amateur teams
- 1977: Cook Bros.
- 1978: S&S Performance
- 1979-1980: TW Racing
- 1980-1982: Diamondback

Professional teams
- 1982: Diamondback
- 1983: SE Racing
- 1983: LRP Racing
- 1983: Shadow Racing
- 1983-1986: CW Racing
- 1986-1989: Haro Designs
- 1989: Vans
- 1989-1990: Vans/MCS
- 1990-1992: Vans/Diamondback
- 1992: Vans/Hawk Racing
- 1992-1993: GHP/Pro Forx
- 1993-1995: ParkPre
- 2000-2001: Vans
- 2010: Redman Rockstar

Peter Pete Loncarevich (born April 8, 1966) is an American former bicycle motocross (BMX) racer. Loncarevich was an "old school" professional BMX racer whose prime competitive years were from 1980 to 1994. He is of Croatian origin.

Nicknamed the "Pistol Pete", Loncarevich received the moniker the way many racers did with the announcer choosing one for him. In 1984 at an American Bicycle Association national, Merl Mennenga, the founder and then President of the ABA, who often also announced "play by play" for the audience at ABA nationals called him "The Pistol" for his penchant in getting the "holeshot" out of the starting gate like a bullet out of a gun. It was also a simultaneous allusion to Loncarevich's similar-sounding name to former professional National Basketball Association (NBA) Guard Pete Maravich who had the moniker of "Pistol Pete".

== BMX racing career milestones ==
Note: Professional first are at the national level until otherwise indicated.

Milestone	Event details
Started racing:	Early 1977 Age 11 at Elk's BMX Lodge in Santa Ana, California.
Sanctioning body:	National Bicycle Association (NBA).
Home sanctioning body district(s):	American Bicycle Association (ABA) California 3 (CA-3) (1980); (CA-14) (1982)
First race bike:	Schwinn Sting-Ray
First race result:	Second in 11 Novice.
First win (local):	Probably in 11 Novice on April 17, 1977, at the Santa Ana Elks in Santa Ana, California. Records are spotty.
First sponsor:	Cook Brothers 1977
First national win:	1978 NBA Corona National 12 Expert.
Turned Professional:	December 1982 at age 17.
First Professional race result:	He raced in two local races without winning the mains. In his first pro race on the national level he got a second place in "A" pro on December 29 at the 1982 Jag World Championship (American Bicycle Association (ABA) sanctioned). He won US$500, the equivalent to US$1,074.09 in 2007 dollars. (Cost of Living Calculator) Immediately after the pro main a representative from Diamondback told Loncarevich that his contract with Diamondback was terminated for him turning pro.
First Professional win:	In "B" Pro at the National Bicycle League (NBL) War of the Stars (WOS) National in Northridge, California, on May 14, 1983. He won US$300, the equivalent to US$624.40 in 2007
First Junior Men/Pro* race result:	See "First professional race result".
First Junior Men/Pro win:	See "First Professional win"
First Senior Pro** race result:	Third place in "AA" pro at the ABA Spring Nationals in Fremont, California, on May 30, 1983. He won US$300 or US$624.40 in 2007 dollars.
First Senior Pro win:	In "AA" Pro at the 1983 ABA Wheaties Gold Cup in Las Vegas, Nevada, on October 9, 1983. He won US$280, the equivalent of US$582.77 in 2007
Height and weight at height of his career:	Ht:6'1" Wt:~180-195 lbs. He underwent a substantial weight gain when he put on muscle during the 1985 and 1986 seasons
Retired from Senior pro (A/AA)* circuit:	Unofficially in 1994, but like a lot of pros, they really retired only from the front line AA/A pro points chase circuit for the National no. 1 title. Racing never left his system. He came back to BMX by winning the ABA Masters class, the precursor to the Veteran Pro class, at the 1995 ABA Grand Nationals. He resumed 20" BMX racing on a competitive level in 2000 competing in the ABA's Masters/Veteran Pro class and in "A" pro. This was in addition to and simultaneous with his Mountain Bike (MTB) racing career where he won a Masters World Championship as well as multiple World Cup events. After another hiatus from racing, he competed in the 41-Over Expert class on March 26, 2010.

*In the NBL it was/is "B" Pro/Super Class/"A" Pro/Junior Men, all depending on the era; in the ABA it has been and is "A" Pro regardless of the era (post 1980).
**In the NBL it is "A" Pro/All Pros/"AA" Pro/Elite Men, all depending on the era; in the ABA it has been and is "AA" Pro regardless of the era (post 1980).

=== Career factory and major bicycle shop sponsors ===
Note: This listing only denotes the racer's primary sponsors. At any given time a racer could have numerous co-sponsors. Primary sponsorships can be verified by BMX press coverage and sponsor's advertisements at the time in question. When possible exact dates are given.

==== Amateur ====
- Cook Bros.: 1977
- S&S (Street & Strip) Performance Products: 1978
- TW Racing: December 1979-September 1980. Allegedly Peter Loncarevich's father's business partners who ran TW stole and absconded with US$5,000 from his father and he subsequently stopped racing for them after they couldn't be found.
- Diamond Back (Centurion): September 1980-December 1982. Loncarevich would turn pro while with this sponsor.

==== Professional ====
- Diamond Back: September 1980-December 1982. Briefly with DB as a pro, about three days. DB and Loncarevich did not see eye to eye about Loncarevich turning pro at the time. DB did not think he was ready and wanted Loncarevich to help them win Team Trophy, a prestigious accolade for the best factory team of the year awarded by a sanctioning body depending on how well a team does as a group in Nationals throughout the season. They wanted Eddy King (who joined DB at the same time Loncarevich did but was two years older) to turn pro before Loncarevich and for Loncarevich to wait a year. After his second-place result in "A" pro in his pro debut at the ABA Jag World Championship in 1982, Diamondback terminated his contract. The two parties went their separate ways. The termination motivated him to prove to himself he was a top pro and beat Harry Leary and Eddy King, Diamondback's marque pros.
- SE Racing (formerly Scot Enterprises Racing Division, now called Sports Engineering, Inc.): January 1983-Mid February 1983. Allegedly Scot Breithaupt, the owner of SE Racing and a BMX pioneer, wanted Loncarevich to drop the family BMX business, Loncarevich Racing Products, and race solely for SE Racing.
- LRP (Loncarevich Racing Products): Mid February 1983-November 1983. LRP was a company he and his father started that sold BMX accessories like titanium seatpost and pedal cages and a small clothing line.
- Shadow Racing: November 1983-Mid December 1983. Shadow Racing was owned by the same person who owned CW, Roger Worsham. It made its own line of BMX bicycles and components. Loncarevich would later move over to CW.
- CW (Custom Works) Racing: Mid December 1983-April 1, 1986. Although Mr. Loncarevich had a contract to race for CW until April 1986, he showed up and raced in the November 1985 ABA Grand Nationals in a Haro uniform. He had previously signed a contract with Haro to race for them after Haro offered more money and CW didn't match the offer. Roger Worsham threatened to sue Loncarevich for breach of contract. Worsham apparently went so far as to file a restraining order to prevent Loncarevich from moving to Haro prematurely. The court turned down the request. Roger Worsham appealed the decision but dropped the case after, according to Loncarevich, it was clear he wasn't going to become ABA No.1 pro for 1985. As it is with most disputes of this kind it was over salary. Loncarevich felt that he should have gotten a large monetary raise in light of winning the ABA number one pro for 1985. Haro Designs did offer a raise increase to his salary. Peter said, "When you're an athlete, you have to get what you can while you can, because next year you might have a terrible season. So I went with Haro Designs." This is particularly true in the sport of BMX racing in which there isn't the infrastructure for a pension plan for retired Pros or a minimum salary requirement and no effective professional racer's union (although they have been efforts to organize such going back to 1976 in the National Bicycle Association (NBA)). Things are very much like what professional baseball players faced 120 years ago, except there is no formal or informal collusion to prevent racers from going from one sponsor to another if he doesn't like the terms. One irony in Loncarevich signing with CW in the first place: Apparently CW made it a clause of sponsorship for the Loncarevich family to shut down their business, Loncarevich Racing Products. That was the very same condition that allegedly made Pete Loncarevich leave SE Racing.

Side Note: "CW" never stood for "Coast Wheels" as it is widely thought. Coast Wheels was a bike shop that Roger Worsham owned. Custom Works was a completely different and independent company. This is in contrast with JMC (Jim Melton Cyclery) which did start out as a bicycle shop and then began manufacturing its own BMX components including entire bicycles.

- Haro Designs/Bicycles: April 1, 1986-May 1989. Apparently Haro Designs allegedly lured Mr. Loncarevich under the false pretense of a co-sponsorship offer when they fully intended to offer Peter a full factory contract. Left Haro after extended and fruitless contract negotiations.
- Vans (Van Doren Rubber Co.): May 1989-November 1989
- Vans/MCS (Moto Cross Specialties) Bicycle Specialties: November 1989-July 1990. Vans and MCS joined forces. MCS supplied the racing bicycles.
- Vans/Diamondback: July 1990-May 1992. MCS dropped Loncarevich and all other riders except Terry Tenette, but Vans kept him and he picked up Diamondback as a second primary sponsor.
- Vans/Hawk Racing: May 1992-Mid November 1992. Peter was still sponsored by Vans and was still his main sponsor sending him around the racing circuit, but Hawk Racing supplied the bike. Vans was and is a tennis shoe and skateboard/BMX apparel maker.
- GHP (Greg Hill Products)/Pro Forx: Mid November 1992-May 1993. GHP would discontinue making frame and fork sets in mid-1993 causing GHP sponsored racers to find other sponsors.
- ParkPre Bicycles (Integra Precision Corporation): 1993-1995
- Retired from competition 1996 through 1999.
- Vans: January 2000 – 2001. Loncarevich raced in the Veteran Pro class for approximately a year before retiring from Professional BMX racing permanently.
- Retired from competition 2001 through 2009
- Redman Rockstar: January 2010–Present. Loncarevich returned to BMX competition after an approximate eight-year hiatus.

=== Career bicycle motocross titles ===
Note: Listed are District, State/Provincial/Department, Regional, National, and International titles in italics. "Defunct" refers to the fact of that sanctioning body in question no longer existing at the start of the racer's career or at that stage of his/her career. Depending on point totals of individual racers, winners of Grand Nationals do not necessarily win National titles. Series and one off Championships are also listed in block.

==== Amateur ====
National Bicycle Association (NBA)

- 1979 Jag 13 Expert and 11-13 Trophy Dash World Champion (Doubled) (NBA/NBL sanctioned)
- 1981 15 Expert, 15 & Over Open and Trophy Dash (Triple) Grandnational Champion. This was the last NBA National event before merging with the NBL.

Bicycle Motocross League (BMXL)

- 1978 National No.1 Amateur

National Bicycle League (NBL)

- 1980 California State No.1
- 1980 Jag 14 Expert World Champion (NBL sanctioned)
- 1981 15 Expert National No. 1

United Bicycle Racers (UBR)

- 1981 15 Expert Grandnational Champion

American Bicycle Association (ABA)

- 1980 California District 3 (Cal-3) No.1† and State No.1
- 1980 14 Expert and 14 year Old Trophy Dash Grandnational Champion
- 1982 California District 14 (Cal-14) No.1

†Shared with 13 Expert Kelly McDougall
International Bicycle Motocross Federation (IBMXF)

- 1981 15 Expert International Champion

United States Cycling Federation (USCF)*

- 1981 Jag 15 Expert World Champion

NBL rules and nomenclature were followed generally, however, no points were awarded and applied to the NBL or any other recognized BMX governing body. The NBL ceased sanctioning the Jag World Championships because by this time it was the US affiliate of the IBMXF which was holding its own World Championships. Renny Roker, the promoter of the Jag World Championship races refused to rename this race. Consequently, the NBL pulled its sanction for the 1981 race and future Jag "World Championship" races.
*The USCF is now USA Cycling.

==== Professional ====
National Bicycle Association (NBA)

- None

Bicycle Motocross League (BMXL)

- None

National Bicycle League (NBL)

- 1985 "A" Pro Grandnational Champion
- 1986 "A" Pro and Pro Award Grandnational Champion
- 1986, 1987 National No. 1 Pro

United Bicycle Racers (UBR)

- None

American Bicycle Association (ABA)

- 1982 "A" Pro 2nd Place Jag World Champion (ABA sanctioned)
- 1983 "AA" Pro U.S. Gold Cup Champion.
- 1984 "AA" Pro U.S. Gold Cup Champion.
- 1984 National No. 1 Pro.
- 1986 Honda Supercup Champion. Prize: Honda Reflex Motorcycle.
- 1986 "AA" Pro Grandnational Champion
- 1986 National No. 1 Pro. Prize: 1986 GMC Chevrolet S-15 4X4 truck.
- 1988 Pro U.S. Gold Cup East Champion.
- 1989 Pro Cruiser Grandnational Chimpion
- 1991 Pro U.S. Gold Cup West Champion.
- 1991 "AA" Pro Grandnational Champion
- 1991 National No. 1 Pro. Loncarevich won a 1991 Isuzu mini pick-up truck.
- 1992 "King of Los Angeles"* (KOLA) series (ABA sanctioned).
- 1992 Pro Supercup Champion. He won a US$5,000 trip for two to Tahiti.
- 1992 "AA" Pro Grandnational Champion
- 1992 National No. 1 Pro. He won a red 1992 Izusu pickup truck.
- 1995 Veteran Pro Grandnational Champion

*The King of Los Angeles was a pro series of seven races held at ABA tracks in the Southern California/Los Angeles area hastily put together on the same weekend to counter the debut and emergence of a new and as it turned out short live sanctioning body called the International Cycling Association (ICA) (which was founded in part by Pro racer Greg Hill) which was holding its first event, the Cowboy National in Dallas, Texas, during that same weekend. The ABA paid some top pro racers including Pete Loncarevich to participate along with putting up a US$7,000 pro purse. Terry Tenette was the only elite top pro to attend the inaugural ICA national.

United States Bicycle Motocross Association (USBA)

- 1986 National No. 1 Pro

International Bicycle Motocross Federation (IBMXF)

- 1987 20" Pro Vision Street Wear World Cup* Champion
- 1990 Pro World Champion

*The Vision Street Wear World Cup was the direct descendant of the Murry World Cup. Murray stopped sponsoring the World Cup after the fifth 1986 edition due to the failure of Murray of Ohio bicycle company and the NBL to come to an agreement about the sponsorship fee Murray would have had to pay the NBL. If Murray continued its sponsor ship, the 1987 addition would have been the sixth (VI) in the series.

Pro Series Championships and Invitationals

- Bicross de Paris 1986 Challenge Yop Champion (King of Bercy 3)

The 1986 Paris Yoplait BMX Challenge was an invitational race sponsored and promoted by the Yoplait Yogurt company in which American and English pros as well as French pros were brought together to compete in a single race. As is typical in Europe, the public had greater enthusiasm for BMX than the American public, in part because bicycle racing of any type was and is much more popular in Europe (and in Asia and South America as well) than in the United States. As with the 1985 addition, which Tommy Brackens won, it was a hit in France with tickets sold out two months in advance.

=== BMX related product lines ===
- 1984: The CW Racing "Pistol Pete" Pro Frame.

Product evaluation:
BMX Action August 1984 Vol.9 No.8 pg.50

- 1992: Applied Tectonics Inc. (ATi) "The Pistol Grip" handlebar hand grips.

Product evaluation:

=== Notable accolades ===
- 1986 BMX Plus! Racer of the Year Award winner with 35.07% of the total 2,997 votes cast. Prize won: A 1986 Suzuki Quad sport four wheel drive All Terrain Vehicle (ATV), also known as a Quad Bike or Quad Cycle, essentially a motocross motorcycle with four wheels instead of just two.
- 1987 BMX Plus! Racer of the Year Award winner with 36.92% of the total 2,925 votes cast. Prize won: A Suzuki RM125 motocross motorcycle.
- 1988 BMX Action Number One Racer Award (NORA) winner. No vote totals or breakdown given.
- 1992 BMX Plus! Racer of the Year Award winner. No percentage or total vote given. Prize won: An Ovation Celebrity Deluxe Guitar. Very appropriate given his Rockabilly hobby.
- In 1992 American BMXer, the ABA's in-house tabloid newspaper formerly called ABA Action and now known as BMXer named Loncarevich the greatest Racer of all time. He was also named Golden Crank "Pro of the Year" in the First Annual Reader's Choice Award for 1992 with 23% of the vote.
- Named the 1993 ABA BMXer Golden Crank "Racer of the Year"
- 1993 BMX Plus! Racer of the Year Award winner. No percentage or total vote given. Apparently no prize was given.
- Pete Loncarevich is a 1997 ABA BMX Hall of Fame Inductee.
- His four ABA "No. 1 pro" titles are only matched by Gary Ellis.

=== Significant BMX related injuries ===
- Broken arm at a race in New Jersey in 1980.
- Injured knee at 1981 Jag World Championships in a collision with teammate Eddy King in Trophy Dash. Required surgery and was laid up for six months.
- Broke collar bone on October 25, 1987, at the ABA Western Regional Gold Cup in Reno, Nevada, five weeks before 1987 ABA Grand national. Was told he would be out three months by doctors, but Peter did not want to miss the Grands. He contacted a renowned sports medicine doctor that involved a 12-hour a day at a cost of $1000 per diem in an effort to retain. He attempted to race and made it as far as the semi-finals, but did not transfer to the main.
- Broke two ribs while training on his bike on July 4, 1988, while visiting his cousin in Ohio. Laid up approximately a month. His first race back was the 1988 US Gold Cup Championships East event held in Mississippi.
- Sprained ankle playing basketball between the two weeks of January 24 and January 27, 1990, missing the ABA Lonestar Nationals held on the weekend of January 27.

== Other activities ==
=== Music ===
During his amateur BMX career he was a member of a Rockabilly band singing and playing guitar in Orange County, California. Due to racing commitments he had to leave it but he still played during his leisure time. By most accounts he was very good.

=== Brazilian Jiu-Jitsu ===
In his early twenties he began studying Brazilian Jiu-Jitsu (BJJ) and other martial arts. He is now a 3rd degree black belt in BJJ under Joe Moreira. He has won a couple of titles including coming in first in the Black Belt Senior 1 Male Lightweight class at the 2006 Pan American Championship held by the International Brazilian Jiu-Jitsu Federation under the Brazilian Confederation (CBJJ). Pete Loncarevich now teaches BJJ out of the Lotus Club in Medford, Oregon.

== BMX magazine covers ==
Bicycle Motocross News:

- None

Minicycle/BMX Action & Super BMX:

- May 1984 Vol.11 No.5. (SBMX)
- February 1985 Vol.12 No.2. Also posing in centerfold with actress Debbie Sue Voorhees. (SBMX&F)
- September 1985 Vol.10 No.9 with Greg Hill and Harry Leary. (BMXA)
- December 1985 Vol.12 No.12 in insert with unidentified racer. Main image Ron Wilkerson. (SBMX&F)
- March 1986 Vol.13 No.3 (SBMX&F)
- November 1988 Vol.15 No.11 with teammate Mike King in insert. In separate inserts Eric Carter; Jeff Donnell & Charlie Davidson; freestyler Eddie Fiola. (SBMXF)

Bicycle Motocross Action & Go:

- July 1988 Vol.13 No.7 (BMXA)
- December 1991 Vol.3 Iss.2 In inset Keith Treanor. (Go)

BMX Plus!:

- April 1984 Vol.7 No.4 in inset. In separate insets D.D. Leone, freestyler Mike Dominguez; and Richie Anderson.
- July 1984 Vol.7 No.7 behind Stu Thomsen with Brian Patterson in third. In insets Mercury Morgan (top "rip"), freestyler Mike Dominguez (circle).
- December 1984 Vol.7 No.12 (73) in insert ahead of Anthony Sewell (13) (bottom center) In other inserts Eric Rupe (22) & Clearance Perry (20) (top center); freestylers Mike Dominguez (top left); Woody Itson (top right); Rick Avella (bottom left); Ron Wilkerson with Shawn Buckley clowning around.
- May 1985 Vol.8 No.5 in insert with Gary Ellis, Tommy Brackens, Ronnie Anderson & Eddy King; Scott Clark in circular insert; Martin Aparijo insert; and Chris Meier as main image.
- August 1985 Vol.8 No.8 with Mike Miranda, Scott Clark, Harry Leary, Robert Fehd & Billy Griggs in separate inserts and together on a starting line in the top insert.
- December 1985 Vol.8 No.12 with Gary Ellis (9) and Tommy Brackens (3). Also Dizz Hicks and Brian Scura (building quarter pipe) in separate inserts.
- February 1986 Vol.9 No.2 behind of Mike Miranda. Inset Sidehackers Perez & Garrido.
- March 1986 Vol.9 No.3 in top insert (1) ahead of Frank Post (18) Ronnie Anderson (3) Eddy King (7) Don Johle (10) and Brian Patterson (6) in bottom right insert skateboarder Lester Kasai and in bottom left insert freestyler Mike Dominguez. In main image both Dominguez and Kasai.
- October 1986 Vol.9 No.10 in bottom insert (3) ahead of Eric Rupe (2), Eddy King (6); in upper insert left to right is Robby Rupe, Scott Towne, Billy Griggs, Dave Cullinan & Tim Ebbett. Main image Todd Anderson.
- February 1987 Vol.10 No.2. (2) in insert behind Mike Miranda (5) and beside Eddy King (6). In separate insert top freestyler Martin Aparijo frame standing on MX motorcycle. Main Image: Freestyler Rich Sigur
- April 1987 Vol.10 No.4 In bottom insert (2) with Rick Palmer (13 in green) & Ken Aman (13 in blue) in top insert freestyler Tod Anderson. Main image freestyler Tim Rogers.
- June 1987 Vol.10 No.6 ahead of Stu Thomsen in insert. In cartoon caricature at bottom Ron Anderson. Main image: freestyler Tim Rodgers.
- October 1991 Vol.14 No.10 with Gary Ellis, Todd Corbitt & Steve Veltman.
- July 1992 Vol.15 No.7 (1) in left center insert ahead of Gary Ellis (2)and two unidentifies (4) & (13). In right center insert unidentifieds; in bottom insert unidentifieds; in top insert freestyler Matt Hoffman
- December 1992 Vol.15 No.12 in top insert in a dead tie with Gary Ellis (2) in center and Charles Townsend (3) in background. In right center insert Tim Judge c. 1984; in bottom left insert unidentified BMXer and MXer. Main image freestylers Brian Blyther & Ron Wilkerson in 1986.
- March 1994 Vol.17 No.3 Fifth from right (head obscured) on the starting gate with fellow pros on his left side Brian Lopes (5), Mike King, Eric Carter (25), Steve Veltman and to Loncarevich's right an unidentified racer. In top insert Haro Monocoque BMX racing bicycle.

Total BMX:

Bicycles and Dirt:

- January 1984 Vol.2 No.4 (A) with Clint Miller just inside of the frame to the left.

Snap BMX Magazine & Transworld BMX:

NBA World & NBmxA World (The official NBA/NBmxA membership publication):

Bicycles Today & BMX Today (The official NBL membership publication with one name change):

ABA Action, American BMXer, BMXer (The official ABA membership publication with two name changes):

USBA Racer (The official USBA membership publication):

- October 1986 (16) with two unidentified racers. This cover was page 55 within the October 1986 Vol.8 No.9 issue of the ABA's American BMXer. The USBA paper was incorporated into American BMXer after the ABA acquired* the USBA, so technically it is not a cover but probably would have been if the USBA was still an independent sanctioning body.

*After the ABA acquired the USBA the ABA printed USBA Racer within American BMXer beginning with the May 1986 issue.
USBA Racer (as an independent publication):

== BMX and general media interviews and articles ==
- LRP Products by Pete Loncarevich Super BMX March 1982 Vol.9 No.3 pg.74 article about Loncarevich Racing Products, Pete's family owned BMX company.
- "Pete Loncarevich:"Pistol Pete" Shoots from the Hip" BMX Plus! April 1984 Vol.7 No.4 pg.48
- "Devonshire" BMX Action July 1984 Vol.9 No.7 pg.26. One of eight mini-interviews with other racers held during the 1984 Devonshire Downs NBL race.
- "Five minutes with Pete himself" BMX Action August 1984 Vol.9 No.8 pg.52
- "Unquestionably Pete!" Super BMX September 1984 Vol.11 No.9 pg.16
- "Pete Loncarevich's Last Lap At Lubbock" Bicycles and Dirt September 1984 Vol.2 No.10 pg.52 Mini sidebar with Loncarevich describing how best to race the 1983 ABA Lonestar National track in Lubbock, Texas.
- "Round Table Blabbin' With ABA Numero Uno Pro, Pistol Pete Loncarevich" BMX Action June 1985 Vol.10 No.6 pg.26
- "Pistol Pete: Gunning for Glory" BMX Plus! August 1985 Vol.8 No.8 pg.59
- "How I Won the ABA Number One Pro Plate" Super BMX & Freestyle September 1985 Vo.12 No.9 pg.36 Story written by Pete Loncarevich
- "A Tale Of Two Champions" Super BMX & Freestyle December 1985 Vol.12 No.12 pg.26 Duel interview with Pete Loncarevich and Greg Hill on how they did at the 1985 NBL Grand Nationals.
- "Peter!" Super BMX & Freestyle January 1987 Vol.14 No.1 pg.47
- "Pistol Pete's Training Plan" BMX Plus! March 1987 Vol.10 No.3 pg.40
- "Peter Loncarevich" BMX Action December 1987 Vol.12 No.12 pg.14
- "Hill & Loncarevich" BMX Plus! May 1988 Vol.11 No.5 pg.140 A joint interview with Greg Hill & Pete Loncarevich.
- "The Pistol Goes Off" Go Magazine December 1991 Vol.3 Issue 2 pg.18
- "On the Air With BMX Plus! A BMX talk show?" BMX Plus! March 1992 Vol.15 No.3 pg.62. Partial transcript of radio show interview with Pete Loncarevich, Todd Anderson and Freestyler Dave Voelker.
- Vans' Grand Slam! Taking a stand on BMX!" BMX Plus! April 1992 Vol.15 No.4 pg.32 Interviews with Loncarevich and his team mates Terry Tenette, Steve Veltman and Racer/Team Manager Everette Rosecrans.
- "Bang, Bang The Pistol Fires Twice More" side bar. BMX Plus! June 1992 Vol.15 No.6 pg.19
- "Pistol Pete Speaks" BMX Plus! July 1993 Vol.16 No.7 pg.64 Detailed article on Loncarevich's career.
- "Back In Action: Pete Loncarevich" Snap BMX Magazine July 2000 Vol.7 Iss.7 No.45 pg.87 mini interview about his return to BMX competition.
- "Flashback: Pete Loncarevich" Transworld BMX March 2003 Vol.10 Iss.3 No.77 pg.30

== Post BMX Career ==
After BMX, Pete went on to have a major career in mountain biking, and after that, he, for a short time, was the team manager for the west coast Razor Scooter pro team, touring the world for such events as the Panasonic Core Tour, and various promotional demos.

== Mountain Bike (MTB) career ==
Like many of his fellow BMX top amateurs and pros, Pete Loncarevich tried his hand at mountain bike racing (MTB) late in his BMX career. In 1994 Loncarevich moved on in such a manner to MTB after essentially winning everything there was to win in BMX and getting bored as this 1998 Dirtrag.com interview excerpt illustrates:

Fraser: So how come you decided to switch to downhill mountain biking from BMX?

Pete: Ah, because I'd accomplished all the goals that I'd accomplished more than three times. So I was, like, you know, wasn't really accomplishing anything that I hadn't already accomplished so I wanted to move, you know? I didn't want to be just a BMX racer my whole life. So that's where I switched to downhill Mountain biking. It was new to me; it was like BMX when I first started.
Fraser: So you were basically bored riding BMX?

Pete: Exactly! ----dirtrag.com 1998

He went on to have a career almost as successful racing mountain bikes as he did racing BMX, earning several titles starting in 1992. His main MTB discipline is in the Downhill category. Started Racing: 1994

Sub Discipline: Downhill

First race result:

Sanctioning Body:

Retired:

=== Career MTB Sponsors ===
Note: This listing only denotes the racer's primary sponsors. At any given time a racer could have numerous co-sponsors. Primary sponsorships can be verified by MTB press coverage and sponsor's advertisements at the time in question. When possible exact dates are given.

==== Amateur ====
No amateur status

==== Professional ====
- Vans/Pro Forx: 1993-
- ParkPre Bicycles (Integra Precision Corporation): 1993-
- Vans (Van Doren Rubber Co.)/Iron Horse Bicycle Company: 1999-
- ParkPre Bicycles: 2000-

=== Career MTB racing titles ===
Note: Listed are Regional, National, and International titles.

==== Amateur ====
- No amateur status. Because of his previous status of being a professional in BMX racing, he was placed into the professional class of MTB immediately.

==== Professional ====
Union Cycliste Internationale (UCI)

- 1996 Mountain Bike World Cup
- 1998 Masters World Downhill Championships Men's 30-39 Mont-Sainte-Anne, CAN 3rd. Men's Master US National Team included: Lou DeAngelis, Tommy Rogers, Mike Giem, Pete Loncarevich, Jimmy Deaton, Stephen Sturges, and Greg Herbold.
- 1999 Masters World Downhill Champion (4' 41.88" beating Pete Zablotny by over 10 seconds)
