= Scott Clark (BMX rider) =

American bicycle motocross rider (born 1962)

Personal information
- Full name: Scott Clark
- Born: June 8, 1962 (age 64) Morgan Hill, California U.S.
- Height: 1.70 m (5 ft 7 in)
- Weight: 79.4 kg (175 lb)

Cycling career
- Sport: Cycling
- Current team: Retired
- Discipline: Bicycle Motocross (BMX)
- Role: Racer
- Rider type: Off Road

Amateur teams
- 1974-1976: The Bicycle Hut of San Jose
- 1976: Speedo Racing Products
- 1976: Rick & Rick Racing

Professional teams
- 1976-1977: Rick & Rick Racing
- 1977-1980: Robinson Racing Products
- 1980-1981: Rondo
- 1981: Bear Development
- 1981: JMC Racing Equipment
- 1981-1984: Murray of Ohio
- 1984-1986: Redline Engineering
- 1986: Scott Clark Products
- 1986: Robinson Racing Products
- 1986: Scott Clark Products
- 1987-1995: (retired for eight years)
- 1995: Boss Racing Products

Scott Clark (born June 8, 1962) is an American "Old School" former professional Bicycle Motocross (BMX) racer whose prime competitive years were from 1978 to 1985. Like Eric Rupe, he had no well-known nickname despite being a top pro.

== Racing career ==
Note: Professional first are on the national level unless otherwise indicated.

Started Racing: Late 1974 at 12 years old.

Sanctioning body: Local Police Athletic League (PAL)

First race bicycle: He borrowed a friend's Schwinn Sting for his first race. After the race he purchased a Webco.

First race result: First Place.

First win (local): See Above

Home sanctioning body district(s): National Bicycle Association (NBA) District "N" (Northern California);

First sponsor: 1974, The Bicycle Hut of San Jose; one month after he started racing.

First national win: In 12-13 Expert at the first annual National Bicycle Association (NBA) Grandnational Championship in Newhall, California on November 23, 1975. This was the first ever BMX Grandnational Championship.

Turned professional: 1976 at 14 years of age. He was the third racer to turn professional at the time. David Clinton and Byron Friday were the first two in that order.

First Professional race* result:

First Professional* win: 1977 in a Colorado National with the National Bicycle Association (NBA).

Retired: Late 1986 Age 24 during "the year of no sponsors" when even some of the most respected top pros could not find sponsorships due to manufacturers cutting back or dropping entirely their factory racing teams. The cause of this were in part to the financial problems brought on by the advents of the revival of skateboarding, the high price of producing bicycles in the United States and most importantly companies trying to start and make room for freestyle teams with the huge boom in BMX Freestyle.

Height & weight at the height of his career (1977–1985): Ht:5'7" Wt:~185-200 lbs.

*At the time there was no separate pro class for pros due to the relatively small number of pros. They raced with the 16 Experts, making it a Pro/Am class essentially. This is why during the early years of the pro division the national number one racer of a sanctioning body could be either an amateur or professional. This practice continued until the NBA's 1979 season in which the pros earned separate pro points and a separate pro plate from the amateurs. The ABA and NBL followed suit for the 1980 season.

=== Career factory and major bicycle shop sponsors ===
Note: This listing only denotes the racer's primary sponsors. At any given time a racer could have numerous co-sponsors. Primary sponsorships can be verified by BMX press coverage and sponsor's advertisements at the time in question. When possible exact dates are given.

==== Amateur ====
- The Bicycle Hut of San Jose: Late 1974-Early 1976.
- Speedo Racing Products: Early 1976-Late 1976. Speedo ran into financial troubles and dropped the race team.
- R & R (Rick Ankron & Rick Varner) Racing: Late 1976-Mid 1977. Scott turned pro with this sponsor.

==== Professional ====
- R & R Racing: Late 1976-Mid 1977. Rick & Rick ran into financial troubles and went out of business.
- Robinson Racing Products: Late 1977-Mid December 1980.
- Rondo: Late December 1980-Late February 1981. Differences in outlook over what is the responsibility of a Sponsor to its racer.
- Bear Development: Late February 1981-June 1981. Scott joined Bear two days after leaving Rondo. Bear dropped its racing team six months after Scott joined.
- JMC (James Melton Cyclery) Racing Equipment: Mid June 1981-July 1981. A short approximately one-month-long sponsorship.
- Murray of Ohio: Late August 1981-September 1984. Scott Clark asked Murray to be let out of his contract because of his perceived low number of races that Murray would send their races to. Seeing this Clark started negotiations with Redline several months before. Murray granted his request to terminate his contract.
- Redline Engineering: September 1984-December 1986. His first race for Redline was the USBA Southern California National in Azusa, California on October 28, 1984. He left under bad circumstances. Redline allegedly had a verbal agreement with Scott to race another year as their only pro. However, with the coming of Greg Hill Scott departed Redline.
- SCP (Scott Clark Products): January 1986-Early March 1986. Scott Clark started this BMX accessory company in early 1982.
- Robinson Racing Products: Early March 1986-June 1986.
- SCP (Scott Clark Products): June 1986-August 1986. Failing to get a sponsor, Scott Clark retires from racing during the summer of 1986.
- Boss Racing Products: 1995. In the early 1990s Clark started raced in the veteran pro class.

=== Career Bicycle Motocross titles ===
Note: Listed are District, State/Provincial/Department, Regional, National, and International titles in italics. "Defunct" refers to the fact of that sanctioning body in question no longer existing at the start of the racer's career or at that stage of his/her career. Depending on point totals of individual racers, winners of Grand Nationals do not necessarily win National titles. Series and one off Championships are also listed in block.

==== Amateur ====
National Bicycle Association (NBA)

- 1975 12-13 Expert Grandnational Champion. This was the first ever BMX Grandnational Championship race.
- 1977 14 Expert Champion in RC Cola/Two Wheeler's Race of Champions Invitational

The RC Cola/Two Wheeler's Race of Champions was a seven race NBA series sponsored by RC Cola and Two Wheelers. Racers raced six regional qualifying races in California and Arizona. Only racers who made at least the semi-finals or mains (if the class was too small for a semi final) were invited to race the Championship event held on May 15, 1977 in Gardena, California at Ascot Park.

- 1977 National No.3 (Pro/Am Title)
- 1977 15 Expert and Open Class District Championships Champion.
- 1978 16 Expert and Trophy Dash and Overall California State Champion

National Bicycle League (NBL)

American Bicycle Association (ABA)

- 1978 16 Expert and 14 & Over Trophy Dash Grandnational Champion

Independent Invitationals and special race series:

==== Professional ====
National Bicycle Association (NBA)

- 1977 National No.3 (Pro/Am Title)
- 1979 National No.1 Pro He won a 1979 Datsun Pickup truck. He was the first Pro to win a car or a truck for becoming a National No.1 pro.
- 1981 National No.1 Pro

National Bicycle League (NBL)

- 1983 Pro Cruiser Grandnational Champion
- 1983 Pro Cruiser National No.3
- 1985 Pro Cruiser Canada Cup Champion.

The Canada Cup was co-sanctioned by the NBL and the Canadian Bicycle Motocross Association (CBMXA). There was some controversy with this win. Stu Thomsen actually physically won the pro cruiser class. However, he was never formally signed up for it. He wrote himself in on the sign up sheets without going through the normal sign up process. He allegedly said after he was disqualified: "I was just waiting to see how long it would take them to find out" As a result he was disqualified and Scott Clark who came in second inherited the win. Stu Thomsen, reading about the incident in the December 1985 issue of BMX Plus! sent a letter to BMX Plus! which was printed in the February 1986 issue:

"After reading your story on the IBMXF World Championships in Canada, I could not help getting upset at your story about me in the Pro Cruiser class. I was unaware at the time that I was not signed up in both Pro Classes (Cruiser and 20"-editor.). I had assumed that Bob Hadley (Huffy team manager-editor.) had signed me up, and when I checked the motoboard, I did not see my name. I could not find Bob Hadley anywhere, so I went over and spoke to Rosie Banks (NBL scorer-editor.), explaining that I thought I was signed up for both Pro classes and could she add my name to the list. I told her that Bob Hadley signed me up, and I could not find him to verify it. I was told it was okay, and I told them that instead of having to bring the moto sheet down the mountain, I would just add my name to the list. They said okay, I found out that I was disqualified when Bob Hadley called me after I was already home in California, and I was surprised, to say the least. I was not just waiting to see how long I could get away with it."

BMX Plus! went on to apologize to Stu Thomsen, saying it got the details of the previous story from Bob Hadley himself and thought subsequently that Thomsen knew of the discrepancy. This implies that it was quoting Bob Hadley when Thomsen allegedly said about "...how long it would take them to find out".

American Bicycle Association (ABA)

- 1982 "AA" Pro 3rd Place Jag World Champion (ABA sanctioned)

United States Bicycle Motocross Association (USBA)

- None

International Bicycle Motocross Federation (IBMXF)

- 1985 Third Place Pro Cruiser World Champion

Pro Series Championships

=== Notable accolades ===
- Named number three of five top riders of Northern California for 1977 by Bicycle Motocross News.
- Scott Clark is a 1997 ABA BMX Hall of Fame Inductee.

=== BMX product lines ===
- 1980 Robinson Racing Products Scott Clark Pro Series Frame w/European Bottom Bracket.

Product Evaluation:

BMX Plus! October 1980 Vol.3 No.10 pg.30

=== Significant injuries ===
- Broken hand in mid 1980 at the dual sponsored NBA/NBL "Chicago Great Race" National in Itasca, Illinois. It forced him out of the race after two motos.
- Broken hand in late 1985. He was back racing by the USBA Nationals in Las Vegas, Nevada on October 12, 1985.

== Post-BMX career ==
Like a lot of his fellow BMXers, his need for the thrill of racing did not end with his BMX career. Immediately after he retired from BMX in late 1986 he got involved in motorcycle speedway racing. Scott Clark has raced sprint/midget cars, motorcycle, and drag racing. He has even raced radio controlled model cars. Scott Clark did race in a few American Bicycle Association Veteran Pro races in the mid-1990s but a series of knee operations forced him to retire from any serious competition and race strictly for fun.

== BMX and general press magazine interviews and articles ==
- "Top Pros Speak Out" BMX Action April 1982 Vol.7 No.4 pg.62 Joint interview with Stu Thomsen, Greg Hill, Kevin McNeal, Eric Rupe, Brent Patterson, and Harry Leary, speaking about various issues facing the racing world.
- "Scott Clark" BMX Action July 1982 Vol.7 No.7 pg.36 A one-page biographic side bar
- "Conversation with Scott Clark" Super BMX July 1981 Vol.8 No.7 pg.36
- "Product Analysis: B&B Electronic Practice Gate" BMX Action September 1984 Vol.9 No.9 pg.10
- "Redline's Scott Clark" Super BMX & Freestyle January 1985 Vo1.12 No.1 pg.38
- "Verbal Jammin' With Scott Clark" BMX Action February 1985 Vol.10 No.2 pg.64

== BMX magazine covers ==
Bicycle Motocross News:

- None

Minicycle/BMX Action & Super BMX:

- March 1981 Vol.8 No.3 (1) in main image. In top insert Perry Kramer head shot. (SBMX)
- July 1981 Vol.8 No.7 (SBMX)
- January 1985 Vol.12 No.1 (SBMX&F) also in centerfold posing with soap opera actress Cindy Gibb.

Bicycle Motocross Action & Go:

- September/October 1978 Vol.3 No.5 behind David Clinton in the lead and ahead of Harry Leary in third place respectively. (BMXA)
- December 1981 Vol.6 No.12
- May 1982 Vol.7 No.5 ahead of Harry Leary, Clint Miller, Denny Davidow, Gregg Grubbs and Tinker Juarez
- July 1982 Vol.7 No.7 with R.L.Osborn.

BMX Plus!:

- January 1980 Vol.3 No.1 This issue also was the debut of the long running Radical Rick comic strip.
- November 1982 Vol.5 No.11
- May 1985 Vol.8 No.5 in circular insert with Pete Loncarevich (1), Gary Ellis (2), Tommy Brackens (36) Ronnie Anderson (13) & Eddy King (67); freestyler Martin Aparijo insert; and freestyler Chris Meier as main image.
- August 1985 Vol.8 No.8 with Mike Miranda, Harry Leary, Pete Loncarevich, Robert Fehd and Billy Griggs in separate inserts and together on a starting line in the top insert.
- August 1986 Vol.9 No.8 (10) in insert ahead of Gary Ellis and Shawn Texas (falling). Main image freestyler Ron Wilkerson.

Total BMX:

Bicycles and Dirt:

NBA World & NBmxA World (The official NBA/NBmxA membership publication):

Bicycles Today & BMX Today (The official NBL membership publication under two names):

ABA Action, American BMXer, BMXer (The official ABA membership publication under three names):

USBA Racer (The official USBA membership publication):
