= Mike Miranda =

Mike Miranda may refer to:

- Michele Miranda (1896–1973), longtime member and eventual consigliere of the Genovese crime family
- Mike Miranda (BMX rider) (born 1963), former American professional Bicycle Motocross (BMX) racer
- Michael Miranda, Filipino basketball player
