= Tommy Brackens =

American bicycle motocross racer (born 1960)

Personal information
- Full name: Tommy Lee Brackens
- Nickname: The Human Dragster
- Born: November 20, 1960 (age 65) Los Angeles, California, U.S.
- Height: 1.78 m (5 ft 10 in)
- Weight: 79.4–81.6 kg (175–180 lb)

Cycling career
- Sport: Cycling
- Current team: Retired
- Discipline: Bicycle Motocross (BMX)
- Role: Racer
- Rider type: Off Road

Amateur teams
- 1979: City of Bicycles
- 1980: The Pedal Shop of North Hollywood
- 1980: JAG BMX

Professional teams
- 1981: JAG BMX
- 1981-1983: Powerlite
- 1983-1984: Torker BMX Products
- 1984-1986: GT Racing
- 1987: KHS
- 1987-1988: World Class Racing/KHS
- 1988-1990: Brackens Racing

Tommy Lee Brackens (born November 20, 1960) is an American former professional "Old School" Bicycle Motocross (BMX) racer. His prime competitive years were from 1980 to 1988.

His nickname was "The Human Dragster", so named for his adeptness at getting the "Holeshot", or getting out in front literally at the drop of the starting gate and leading the other competitors down the first straight and into the first turn. The moniker was coined by Bob Hunt, an NBL announcer at the 1982 NBL Grand Nationals that Tommy raced in. Many racers received their monikers from the pithy play by play race announcers.

Brackens was a former motorcycle motocross (MX) racer that made the switch to BMX in 1977 (he would return to MX after his BMX career). He noted that "...to be the people's favorite is my goal". In 1987 he won BMX Action's Number One Racer Award (NORA) Cup.

Brackens placed National No. 2 within the NBL in 1986. He failed to transfer out of his semi (crashed) while only a few points behind the eventual No.1 for that year, Pete Loncarevich. Brackens won the 1986 IBMXF World Championship.

== Racing career milestones ==
Note: Professional first are on the national level unless otherwise indicated.

Milestone	Event details
Started Racing:	August 11, 1978 at 17 years old. Anthony Sewell, who would later become pro BMXer himself (approximately a year or so before Tommy) introduced him to the sport. As did Turnell Henry and another friend named James Stalworth.
Sanctioning Body:	National Bicycle Association (NBA)
First race bike:	Redline.
First race result:	Second in 16 novice at the Valley Youth Center in Van Nuys, California on August 11, 1978.
First win (local):	
First sponsor:	City of Bicycles.
First national win:	
Turned Professional:	December 1980 age 20. He did it for both monetary reasons and the fact he was 19 years old in the 16 Expert class.
First Professional race result:	Second in "A" Pro Money on January 18, 1981, at the American Bicycle Association (ABA) Northwest National in Seattle, Washington. It was the very first national in which the new ABA junior "A" pro class was run. He also was second in "A" Pro Trophy. Brackens would be one of the first later to be well known pros to graduate from the new junior pro "A" class which was instituted by the ABA.
First Professional win:	In "A" Pro at the ABA Coliseum Classic III national in Detroit, Michigan on February 1, 1981
First Junior Men/Pro* race result:	See "First professional race result".
First Junior Men/Pro win:	See "First Professional win"
First Senior Pro** race result:	First Place in Pro Class at the National Bicycle Association (NBA) Winternationals in Las Vegas, Nevada in February 1981. Unlike the NBA's rivals the ABA and NBL, the NBA did not initiate a second tier, junior pro division for the 1981 racing season. When Brackens turned pro and competed in the pro class in the NBA he raced seasoned veteran professionals like Stu Thomsen, Scott Clark and Kevin McNeal and others of that quality who also raced in the senior pro divisions of the ABA and NBL. Therefore, Brackens was in effect racing senior pro.
First Senior Pro win:	See above.
Height and weight at height of his career (1983–1987):	Ht: 5 ft 10 in (1.78 m) Wt: 174–180 lb (79–82 kg)
Retired:	1990; in part to devote more time to his bicycle frame and fork company Brackens Racing Products.

*In the ABA "A" Pro; in the NBL "B" Pro/Superclass/"A" Pro depending on the era. **In the ABA it was "AA" Pro, in the NBL "A" Pro (Elite Men). However, the NBA did not have a Junior Pro division. The NBA would merge with the NBL after the 1981 season before it had a chance to create a junior pro class. Therefore, any win in the Pro class of the NBA counts as his first Senior pro win.

=== Career factory and major bicycle shop sponsors ===
Note: This listing only denotes the racer's primary sponsors. At any given time a racer could have numerous ever-changing co-sponsors. Primary sponsorships can be verified by BMX press coverage and sponsor's advertisements at the time in question.

==== Amateur ====
- The Pedal Shop: Early 1980-Mid-1980
- Jag BMX: Mid-1980-December 1980. Would turn pro and be briefly with this sponsor as a pro. Left under bad circumstances. Jag wanted Tommy to stay an amateur for one more year, but Tommy wanted to be a pro immediately.

==== Professional ====
- Jag BMX: Mid-1980 – December 1980.
- Powerlite Racing: April 18, 1981 – September 1983. Left because by September 1983 he was the only member of the Powerlite team and he needed the security of being on a true team. Otherwise he left Powerlite on good terms.
- Torker BMX Products: October 1, 1983 – November 1984 Torker literally went out of business while the racing team was racing on the East Coast. He didn't have a clue until people came up to him with the news.
- GT (Gary Turner) Racing: November 1984 – December 31, 1986 On the return flight west after Torker folded Richard Long, the owner of GT, offered Brackens a spot on his team, which he accepted. At the end of his contract he turned down an offer from GT to stay on a pared-down team because his salary would have been reduced. GT offered to compensate by increasing contingency awards (a contingency is a monetary award for coming in first place at any given race as an incentive). Brackens did not accept. According to the September 1999 issue of Snap magazine, it didn't sit well and it left a "bad taste" that freestylers Eddie Fiola and racer Gary Ellis were being paid more and he was offered less than they were being paid. Teammate Gary Ellis remained under those terms.
- KHS (Kung Hsue She): May 1987 – August 1987.
- World Class Racing/KHS: August 1987 – July 1988. World Class Products, Inc. is the product of the merger between Jag BMX and DG Performance Bicycles in the spring of 1982. KHS was still a co-sponsor when World Class Products was Tommy Brackens's main sponsor.
- Brackens Racing: July 1988 – 1990 – This was a Tommy Brackens-owned BMX company that made frames and forks. It was prosperous enough to factory-sponsor Eric Carter at the beginning of his pro career.

=== Career bicycle motocross titles ===
Note: Listed are District, State/Provincial/Department, Regional, National, and International titles in italics. Depending on point totals of individual racers, winners of Grand Nationals do not necessarily win National titles. Only sanctioning bodies active during the racer's career are listed.

==== Amateur ====
National Bicycle Association (NBA)

- 1980 winner of the amateur Race of Champions (ROC) at the 1980 Grand Nationals winning a $3,000 Fisher stereo system Amateurs can win expensive prizes without jeopardizing their amateur status as they would be if they won the cash equivalent.

National Bicycle League (NBL)

- 1980 16 Expert Grandnational Champion

American Bicycle Association (ABA)

- None

==== Professional ====
National Bicycle Association (NBA)

- None

National Bicycle League (NBL)

- 1984 National No.3 Pro
- 1986 National No.2 Pro

American Bicycle Association (ABA)

- None

United States Bicycle Motocross Association (USBA)

- 1986 "A" Pro and Pro Open Race of Champions Champion (Double)

International Bicycle Motocross Federation (IBMXF)

- 1986 Pro European Champion
- 1986 Pro World Champion

Pro Series Championships and Invitationals

- 1984 European Challenge Cup Champion

The 1984 European Challenge Cup was a comparatively small race (130 motos) that drew a select portion of racers, professionals and amateurs, Europeans and Americans held on June 10, 1984, in Slagharen, the Netherlands. Though small, it was well received.

- 1985 Kellog's Frosties BMX Champion.

The Kellogg's Frosties BMX Championship held in Birmingham, England was a series of six races held on three days total (but stretched out over a week including off days) that was centered on the invited 12 top pros of the United States and 12 British pros and tailored for British television broadcast. There were also eight amateurs class races held but the race focus was meant for the pros.

- Bicross de Paris 1985 Challenge Yoplait Champion (King of Bercy 2)

The 1985 Paris Yoplait BMX Challenge was an invitational race sponsored and promoted by the Yoplait Yogurt company in which American and English pros as well as French pros were brought together to compete in a single race. As is typical in Europe, the public had greater enthusiasm for BMX than the American public, in part because bicycle racing of any type was and is much more popular in Europe (and in Asia and South America as well) than in the United States. A staggering (by American standards) 18,000 spectators attended the sell out event and it was covered live on French television.

- 1986 Scorpion International Spring Classic Champion.

The Scorpion International Spring Classic was an invitational race held at Lowestoft, a town in Suffolk, East Anglia, England on May 4, 1986. Four American pros were invited: Eddy King, Scott Clark Travis Chipres and Tommy Brackens. They raced at least four respected English pros in the main including Tim March, Geth Shooter, Garry Llewellyn Jamie Vince and Charlie Reynolds. Other nationalities were invited but did not make the pro main. Brackens was pro champion.

=== Notable accolades ===
- Winner of the National Bicycle Association's "Most Improved Rider" Award in 1981.
- Winner of BMX Action's 1987 Number One Racer Award (NORA) Cup with 17.91% of the vote (total cast unknown)
- He is a 1991 ABA BMX Hall of Fame Inductee.

=== Miscellaneous ===
He was the 1986 winner of the "King of the Mountain" outlaw Gravity Powered Vehicle (GPV) Championship.* This win was the beginning of a career in GPV racings. His enthusiasm was reflected in this quote:

"That, by far...and I'm serious, meant more to me than winning ANY BMX race I've ever won! THAT was intense."----BMX Action March 1987

GPV racing had been around since the late 1970s but achieved wide notoriety among BMXers beginning in early 1985. Many BMXers both retired and active, participated like Jeff Bottema, and Scot Breithaupt among the retirees and Eddy King, Harry Leary, Kevin Hull the active racers. Freestylist as well participated in the discipline like Dave Vanderspek, Eddie Fiola, Ceppie Maes and Rich Sigur. There were racers who participated which their specialty was downhill road racing like Dan Hanabrink as well. Most racers used converted pedalless BMX or Freestyle bicycles, often with the handlebars turned almost completely down. Often so was the bicycle frame with the bottom bracket pointing toward the racer's chest to lower the profile of the bike for greater stability. In later, fairings were added and also bicycles built specifically for downhill runs. They raced down courses (which were public roads) that were from 1.3 to seven miles long, hitting speeds of 50 to 90 mph. The outlaw aspect was that during the early days they would race down open to traffic roads which, while not illegal, was not sanctioned by a formal sanctioning body either, like the NBL sanctioning BMX races. At the beginning of the 1988 GPV season they started getting highway department permission to block off roads, therefore removing the outlaw characteristic of the activity. The sport is still around but the initial faddish aspect of it lasted from mid-1985 to approximately late 1989.

In mid-2000 he qualified for an ESPN X Games GPV race in Saint George, Utah event on a bike he purchased from a Target discount store, beating custom bikes costing US$2,000 to $3,000. It was his very first GPV race since a 1990 race in Palm Springs, California where he set the course record of 90 mph. Scott E. Burdick who made a fairing out of cardboard, and still was able to reach speeds of more than 100 mph in the final straight away of the palm springs California tramway hill. You can find the race as seen on ESPN or on VHS video.

*The table of contents page has it mislabled No.1

=== BMX related product lines ===
- 1988 KHS "Tommy Terminator" signature frame & fork set which was released in January 1988.
- Brackens started his own BMX frame and fork company like Greg Hill did in 1983 with Greg Hill Products (GHP) bearing his name: Brackens Racing Products. It was started in 1988 and sponsored during its short life raciers like Eric Carter and Kevin Hull. Brackens Racing Products was sold to Power Source/Roost in late 1994.

=== Significant injuries ===
- Sprained wrist in Pompano Beach national in May 1983. Laid up for approximately one month.
- Injured leg when his handle bars stabbed him in a leg muscle in a crash during practice before the Friday Pre Race at the NBL, Lemoore, California Nationals in August 1987. He sat out the rest of the weekend missing both the Saturday and Sunday nationals.

=== Racing habits and traits ===
- Variables like track condition or delays could do psychological havoc to him at a race. Was said to lack the "killer instinct" that was necessary to truly dominate the top pro BMX class due to his easy going good natured personality.
- Like his friend and fellow racer Anthony Sewell, he was a power racer who lagged in the technical aspects of racing with his difficulties in negotiating turns (which made him relatively easy to pass if he wasn't too far ahead of the competition) and conversely lacking the skill to set someone up for a pass in those turns if he was behind; and speed jumping multiple moguls called whoop-de-doos inefficiently which made him easier to pass (again if the competition wasn't to far behind to pass). In contrast racers like Richie Anderson, Mike King, Steve Veltman and even Stu Thomsen were known for their smooth speed jumping abilities. One of Richie Anderson's nicknames was "Mr. Smooth" due to this. The otherwise nicknameless Mike King was also occasionally referred to as "Mr. Smooth". This weakness in technique very likely hindered Brackens's ability to win a national title.

== Post BMX career ==
He started his own BMX bicycle company Brackens Racing Products. This is ironic given the answer to a question in a BMX Plus! interview about owning his own company one day:

BMXP!: What are your ambitions after racing? Have your own company, maybe?

Tommy: No! It's too much hassle having your own company!

----BMX Plus! April 1983 page 60.

The company lasted two years from 1988 to 1990 sponsoring racers including Eric Carter along the way. The company went out of business due to competition from overseas. He worked for Huffy Service First a division of Huffy that assembled bicycles for department chain stores. He worked there from his time as part timer while he ran his own bicycle business. When his business folded in 1990, he worked at Huffy Service First full-time up through the early 2000s. Brackens returned to his Motorcycle Motocross racing roots for a time, which he was involved in prior to his BMX career. Proving that BMXers typically like almost all type of racing, during his BMX career (and fittingly in light of his nickname) he has also dabbled in Outlaw Drag Racing, in which participants participate in illegal urban street racing. This was in addition to his GPV racing (as outlined above) which he still participated in through the first decade of the 2000s.

=== BMX and general press magazine interviews and articles ===
- "Powerlite's Tommy Brackens: The Human Dragster Himself" Super BMX February 1983 Vol.10 No.2 pg.26
- "Tommy Brackens" BMX Action June 1983 Vol.8 No.6 pg.50
- "The New Torker" Super BMX November 1984 Vol.11 No.11 pg.22 Mini Bio along with other Torker teammates.
- Mini interview during North Park NBL National BMX Action November 1984 Vol.9 No.11 pg.25
- "Four Taco Lunch And Conversation With Tommy Brackens" BMX Action May 1985 Vol.10 No.5 pg.86
- "How I won that Race" Super BMX & Freestyle May 1985 Vol.12 No.5 pg.59 Story written by Tommy Brackens
- Mini-interview BMX Action August 1985 Vol.10 No.8 pg.44 Gives play by play account of Pro Mains.
- "GT's Human Dragster" Super BMX & Freestyle September 1986 Vol.13 No.9 pg.62
- "A New World Champion" Super BMX & Freestyle December 1986 Vol.13 No.12 pg.32
- "Tommy Brackens: All In The Name Of Fun" BMX Action July 1986 Vol. No.7 pg.20
- "The 1986 IBMXF World Championship: I don't feel any different" BMX Plus! December 1986 Vol.9 No.12 pg.46 Story written by Tommy Brackens of how he won the 1986 World Championship.
- "Tom and Gary: Not to be confused with the cat and mouse" BMX Action February 1987 Vol.12 No.2 pg.64 Joint interview with Gary Ellis.
- "Tommy & Tuni: Ready for '88" BMX Action January 1988 Vol.13 No.1 pg.34 Joint article with Turnell Henry.
- "Flashback: Tommy Brackens" Snap BMX Magazine September 1999 Vol.7 Iss.6 No.35 pg.80 Retrospective of the racer.

== BMX magazine covers ==
Note: Only magazines that were in publication at the time of the racer's career(s) are listed unless specifically noted.

Bicycle Motocross News:

- None

Minicycle/BMX Action & Super BMX:

- July 1982 Vol.9 No.7 (SBMX)
- November 1984 Vol.11 No.11 (SBMX)
- October 1985 Vol.12 No.10. In insert freestyler Scotty Freeman. (SBMX&F)
- December 1986 Vo.13 No.12 (SBMX&F)

Bicycle Motocross Action & Go:

- None

BMX Plus!:

- April 1983 Vol.6 No.4
- May 1985 Vol.8 No.5 in insert with Pete Loncarevich (1), Gary Ellis (2), Ronnie Anderson (13) & Eddy King (67); Scott Clark in circular insert; freestyler Martin Aparijo insert; and freestyler Chris Meier as main image.
- December 1985 Vol.8 No.12 with Pete Loncarevich (16) and Gary Ellis (9). Also Dizz Hicks and Brian Scura (building quarter pipe) in separate inserts.
- September 1986 Vol.13 No.9 in photo composite behind Greg Hill, Eric Rupe, Gary Ellis (1) and unidentified (15). Freestyler Eddie Fiola "above" them.
- July 1987 Vol.10 No.7 In rectangle insert (2) leading Shawn Texas (5) Pete Loncarevich (15) Charles Townsend (9) and two unidentifieds (11) and (6). In triangle insert Harry Leary (1) ahead of Scott Towne (70) and Robby Rupe. In top circle insert freestyler Mike Dominguez. Main image: freestyler Matt Hoffman.

Total BMX:

Bicycles and Dirt:

- None

Bicross Magazine (French Publication):

- Juin (June) 1983 Numéro 10 (No.10) (9) in fourth place behind Stu Thomsen (1) and ahead of Bob Woods (12) in fifth and behind two unidentifies in second and third.

NBA World & NBmxA World )The NBA/NBmxA official publication):

Bicycles Today & BMX Today (the NBL official publication under two names):

ABA Action, American BMXer, BMXer (the ABA official publication under two name changes):

USBA Racer (The official USBA membership publication):
