= Eric Rupe =

American BMX racer (born 1963)

Personal information
- Full name: Eric Fitzgerald Rupe
- Nickname: "Big Daddy"
- Born: June 14, 1963 (age 63) Reseda, California, U.S.
- Height: 1.68 m (5 ft 6 in)
- Weight: ≈66.1 kg (146 lb)

Cycling career
- Sport: Cycling
- Current team: GT Bicycles
- Discipline: Bicycle Motocross (BMX)
- Role: Racer
- Rider type: Off Road

Amateur teams
- 1976: Canyon Schwinn Cyclery
- 1977: Rick & Rick Racing
- 1977: Schwinn Bicycle Company

Professional teams
- 1977-1980: Schwinn Bicycle Company
- 1981: SE Racing
- 1981-1983: Mongoose
- 1983: Profile Competition Racing Products
- 1984-1990: Mongoose
- 1991-1992: Haro Designs/Bicycles
- 1993-1994: Pro Forx-GHP
- 1995-1997: Parkpre Bicycles
- 1997-2007: Mongoose Bicycles
- 2007-2012: GT Bicycles

Eric Fitzgerald Rupe (born June 14, 1963) is an American professional bicycle motocross (BMX) racer. His prime competitive years were from 1978 to 1990.

Considered one of the most underrated BMXers in its history, he also had one of the longest careers in BMX. He nominally retired from Senior pro racing after the 1990 American Bicycle Association Grand National but would go on to participate in Pro BMX competition on a serious basis for another 11 years, albeit in Masters/Veteran pro class, the class for racers past their peak competitive years, much like the Champions Tour (formally called the Senior PGA Tour) in golf. He was given the term "Big Daddy" at a 1988 Rockford ABA race by the announcer Dugan Finnel. He used the phrase “Big Daddy coming out on fire” for his win in Senior pro that day. He specifically called him that because he knew Eric was a father by then with a few children at home. Eric was one of the first racers to become a family man when he had his first child in 1984 (albeit Greg Hill became a father in late 1983) His clean-cut born again Christian lifestyle and philosophy lent greatly to the family man image. Over thirty-four years after his first race he was still racing professionally in the ABA Veteran pro class until recently. Today, he races in the Amateur 45 and Over cruiser class. However, he still is very competitive, winning the USA Cycling BMX National Championship in that class on March 21, 2009.

== Racing career milestones ==
Note: All first in Pro Class are on the national level unless otherwise noted.

Milestone	Event details
Started racing:	November 1974 at age 11 at the Soledad Sands, California Motorcycle Motocross (MX) track. His uncle Bill used to race motorcycles there. The previous November Rupe's father had told him and his brother Robby that he didn't want them to ride their motorcycles anymore least they get hurt. A few days later sensing his sons dis appointments he suggested racing their bicycles there.
Sanctioning body:	National Bicycle Association (NBA)
Sanctioning body district(s):	
First race bike:	A Schwinn Sting-Ray custom welded by his brother Robby Rupe in his school shop class.
First race result:	Sixth place overall (out of eight in his 11 Novice class). He wrecked after the drive chain broke. He raced the next two motos on his older brother's (Robby Rupe) bicycle. It would take him a year to get his first trophy, a second place in January 1976.
First win (local):	February 1976. at the Van Nuys Youth Center in Van Nuys, California, just over a year after he started racing.
First sponsor:	Canyon Schwinn Cyclery (Bike Shop) April 1976.
First national win:	13 Expert, September 1976 NBA Fall Nationals in Las Vegas, Nevada.
Turned professional*:	1977, age 14. In a March 1988 BMX Action interview with Eric Rupe it has him listed as turning pro when he was 13, but in the sidebar "The Life and Times of Eric Rupe", a year-by-year chart of his career, it is listed as having him do so in July 1977. If he was born on June 13, 1963, that would have him being 14 years of age in July 1977, not 13.
First professional race result:	Third place at the local race at the Van Nuys Youth Center on the first night of local races. He won US$3.00 winnings, the equivalent of US$10.18 in 2007 (Cost of Living Calculator). It cost him US$2.00 to enter the race.
First professional win**:	Pro Class at the National Bicycle League (NBL) War of the Stars National in Petersburg, Indiana, on July 5, 1980.
Height and weight at height of his career (1983–1988):	Ht: 5'6" Wt: ≈148 lbs.

Retired (nominally): After 1990 ABA Grand National age 26. It was according to Eric a forced retirement due to the unsatisfactory contracts that were offered him by Mongoose. He even made a formal announcement prior in the September 1990 issue of American BMXer, the American Bicycle Association's newspaper in a letter dated July 24, 1990. However, while he may have retired from the points chasing top pro circuits that contends for no 1 Pro for the year, racing was not out of his system. Like a lot of retired BMX racers who come back and race a national or two for old time's sake and to keep a thumb in the pie, Rupe raced occasionally after his retirement. His post-"retirement" racing was one of the more active. After about 11 months of "retirement" he raced in the October 26–27, 1991 ABA Fall Nationals along with fellow retirees Stu Thomsen and Harry Leary. He had himself reclassified as an "A" pro and came in second to Eric Carter in that division as well as third in Pro Cruiser on Saturday and a fourth in Pro Cruiser on Sunday. In the ABA Grand National of that year he raced and won the Pro Cruiser Class. Most returning pros did it mostly for fun but Rupe had a serious cant to his "semi-retirement". He raced in the 1991 ABA Grand National on December 1, getting a first place in Pro Cruiser. Beginning in 1995, he would race and totally dominate in the mid and late 1990s and early 2000s the ABA Veteran Pro Cruiser class and win the 2000 and 2004 NBL Masters class no. 1 plate. He was still racing seriously in the ABA's Veteran Pro and NBL's Master classes as of 2006. He is 43 years old.

*At the time there was no separate pro class for pros due to the relatively small number of pros. They raced with the 16 Experts, making it a Pro/Am class essentially. This is why during the early years of the pro division the national number one racer of a sanctioning body could be either an amateur or professional. This practice continued until the NBA's 1979 season in which the pros earned separate pro points and a separate pro plate from the amateurs. The NBL and ABA followed suit a year later.
**During the era Eric Rupe turned pro, there wasn't a two-tier system of Junior and Senior pros.

=== Career factory and major bicycle shop sponsors ===
Note: This listing only denotes the racer's primary sponsors. At any given time a racer could have numerous co-sponsors. Primary sponsorships can be verified by BMX press coverage and sponsor's advertisements at the time in question.

==== Amateur ====
- R & R (Rick Ankron & Rick Varner) Racing Products: February 1977-June 1977
- Schwinn Bicycle Company: June 1977-November 1980 Eric turned pro with this sponsor.

Currently racing amateur.

==== Professional ====
- Schwinn Bicycle Company: June 1977-November 1980 He left Schwinn when he got indications that he and his brother Robby Rupe were about to be dropped by them.
- SE Racing (Formally Scot Enterprises, Now called Sports Engineering, Inc.): February 1981-November 1981. Left under unprofessional circumstances.
- Mongoose (BMX Products): November 1981-February 1983.
- Profile Competition Racing Products: February 1983-December 31, 1983.
- Mongoose (BMX Products): January 1, 1984 – November 25, 1990. Retired nominally after the 1990 season due to Mongoose's drastic cut in his salary, from $25,000 a year to $3,000. During the 1990 season Eric was forced to get a normal job to support his family. This cut into his training and practice time significantly which in turn affected his performance at races negatively. Mongoose was going to cut his salary even more which what provoked his-as it turned out-brief retirement.
- Haro Designs/Bicycles: October 1991-December 1992. By late 1991 his brief retirement was over. Following Ronnie Anderson's example in 1990, he had himself reclassified as an "A" pro in the ABA.
- Pro Forx-GHP (Greg Hill Products): January 1993-
- Parkpre Bicycles: 1995-June 1997.
- Mongoose Bicycles (formerly BMX Products): June 1997-February 3, 2007. This was his third stint with Mongoose.
- GT (Gary Turner) Bicycles: February 2007– 2012
- Extreme Team:2013 - 2014
- Vendetta BMX:2015 - 2017
- Redline Bicycles: May 2018–Present

*Pros could race in the amateur classes at the time.

=== Career bicycle motocross titles ===
Note: Listed are district, State/Provincial/Department, regional, national, and international titles in italics. "Defunct" refers to the sanctioning body in question no longer existing at the start of the racer's career or at that stage of his/her career. Depending on point totals of individual racers, winners of Grand Nationals do not necessarily win National titles. Series and one-off Championships are also listed in block.

==== Amateur ====
National Bicycle Association (NBA)

- 1976 13 Expert Western States Champion
- 1977 Local #1 in 14 Expert

National Bicycle League (NBL)

- None

American Bicycle Association (ABA)

- None

=== Professional ===
National Bicycle Association (NBA)

- None

National Bicycle League (NBL)

- 1980 National No.2 Pro
- 1983, 1984 National No.1 Pro
- 1985 National No.2 Pro
- 1986 Pro Cruiser National No.2
- 1987, 1988 National No.1 Pro Cruiser
- 1989 Pro Cruiser Grandnational Champion
- 1995 National No.1 Vet Pro
- 1996 NBL Legends Grandnational Champion
- 2000 National No.1 Masters Pro
- 2000 "A"* Pro National No.1
- 2002 "A" Pro Cruiser Grandnational Champion
- 2002 "A" Pro Cruiser National No.1
- 2004 Master Elite Grandnational Champion
- 2004 National No.1 Masters Pro

*By 2000 the NBL would adapt ABA practice and designate "AA" pro as the Senior pro division and rename "B" pro/Super Class to "A" pro. In the 2004 season the pro designations would be Elite Men and Superclass

American Bicycle Association (ABA)

- 1982 "AA" Pro 2nd Place Jag World Champion (ABA sanctioned)
- 1984 National No.3 Pro
- 1987 Pro Cruiser U.S. Gold Cup West Champion
- 1987, 1988 National No.1 Pro Cruiser
- 1989 Pro Cruiser U.S. Gold Cup West Champion
- 1991 Pro Cruiser Grandnational Champion
- 1996 Veteran Pro Grandnational Champion
- 1995, '96, '97, '98, '99, 2000, '01 National No.1 Pro Veteran Cruiser
- 1997, '98 World Cup Vet Pro Champion
- 1998 World Cup Pro Cruiser Champion
- 1998 Veteran Pro Race of Champions (ROC) Champion
- 1999 Race Of Champions "A" Pro Champion
- 2001 Veteran Pro National No.1
- 2001 World Cup Veteran Pro World Champion
- 2002 "A" Pro National No.3 and Veteran Pro National No.2
- 2003 Veteran Pro Grandnational Champion

United States Bicycle Association (USBA)

- 1984 Unlimited Pro† Grandnational Champion
- 1984 National No.1 Pro
- 1986 Pro Cruiser Grandnational Champion
- 1986 Pro Cruiser National No.2

†"Unlimited Pro" was the USBA's term for its senior professional class. It was renamed "A" Pro in the following racing season.

International Bicycle Motocross Federation (IBMXF)

- 1987, 1989 Pro Cruiser World Champion
- 1987 Pro Cruiser Vision Street Wear World Cup* Champion

*The Vision Street Wear World Cup was the direct descendant of the Murry World Cup. Murray stopped sponsoring the World Cup after the fifth 1986 edition due to the failure of Murray of Ohio bicycle company and the NBL to come to an agreement about the sponsorship fee Murray would have had to pay the NBL. If Murray continued its sponsorship, the 1987 addition would have been the sixth (VI) in the series.

Union Cycliste Internationale (UCI)

- 2005, 2006, 2007 40-44 Cruiser World Champion.

USA Cycling BMX

- 2008 and 2009 45 and Over Men Cruiser National Champion

=== Notable accolades ===
- Winner of the BMX Plus! 1985 Racer of the Year Award with 44% of the reader survey vote. Won a Honda Elite Motor Scooter. This was the first ever BMX Plus! Racer of the Year award.
- 1988 ABA Hall of Fame Inductee.

=== BMX product lines ===
- 1984 Mongoose Eric Rupe Signature Edition Frame Set.

Product Evaluations:

BMX Plus! February 1985 Vol.8 No.2 pg.24 Official BMX Plus! test article.
BMX Action August 1985 Vol.10 No.8 pg.56 Official BMX Action test article.

- 2002 Mongoose "Eric Rupe" Signature Frame

Product Evaluations:

=== Racing habits and traits ===
For whatever reason, Eric Rupe had rarely raced ABA since its inception in 1977 until January 1984. In fact until the GT Supernationals held on January 27, 1984, in Burbank, California, it was only the fourth ABA national he ever attended. He happened to double, winning "AA" and Pro Open class at that one, his first ABA national wins as an amateur or professional.

=== Miscellaneous ===
- In 1977 he was a stunt double doing stunts on a bicycle for the character Riff in the TV show Loser Takes All. In this sense stunt riding does not mean freestyle, but doing perceived difficult high speed maneuvers on a bicycle and/or staged falls.
- He got married on June 2, 1983, to Kathryn H. Meleski (he proposed in February 1983).
- Eric is the father of three boys: Eric Mathew Rupe, born on August 5, 1984; John David Rupe born on December 13, 1986; and Kevin Phyllip Rupe born on September 13, 1988.
- Eric Rupe's elder brother Robert "Robby" Rupe, a respected racer in his own right, married Deana Tomac, John Tomac's sister. John Tomac, after having a notable but comparatively brief BMX pro career, would switch to mountain bike racing (MTB) and would become one of that sport's most respected racers.
- Rupe is a born-again Christian. Also Rupe had a love of golf and video games almost the equal of his love of racing.

=== Significant injuries ===
- Tore ligaments in ankle at the NBL Memphis National on March 31, 1985. His first race back was at the USBA San Antonio Nationals in San Antonio, Texas, on May 4, 1985, after being laid up for five weeks.
- Badly injured left knee on November 3, 1985, at the ABA Lake Elsinore Fall Nationals race. Laid up for four and one half months. His first race back was the 1986 NBL race in Memphis, Tennessee. In Rupe's recount of this injury, he believes it happened in 1986 but he is in error.
- Crashed in the main at the NBL Easter Classic in Sarasota, Florida, on April 11, 2004, breaking his wrist, specifically fracturing his scaphoid bone. He tore a few pectoral muscles as well. He was laid up until the ABA Rockford, Illinois National. This was his first broken bone he received from his 30 years of racing up to that time, although this was not the first time he was badly injured as the previous two times show.
- He suffered severe facial and head injuries in a crash on the second straight at the ABA Silver Dollar Nationals in Reno, Nevada, on January 11, 2008. He had a broken eye socket, cheekbone and temple bone. He had surgery on January 21, 2008, to insert Ti plates in his head to keep the bones in place as they heal. He was expected to be laid up a month. His first race back was the 2008 USA Cycling BMX National Championships in Desoto, Texas, on March 28, 2008, in 45 and over Cruiser.

== BMX and general press magazine interviews and articles ==
- "Eric Rupe" BMX Plus! January 1982 Vol.5 No.1 pg.20
- "Top Pros Speak Out" BMX Action April 1982 Vol.7 No.4 pg.62 Joint interview with Stu Thomsen, Greg Hill, Kevin McNeal, Harry Leary, Brent Patterson, and Scott Clark, speaking about various issues facing the racing world.
- An Eric Rupe side bar. BMX Action August 1982 Vol.7 No.8 pg.40
- "Eric Rupe: A New National Number One Pro." Super BMX January 1984 Vol.11 No.1 pg.70
- "Eric Rupe" BMX Action March 1984 Vol.9 No.3 pg.42
- "Devonshire" BMX Action July 1984 Vol.9 No.7 pg.31. One of eight mini-interviews with other racers held during the 1984 Devonshire Downs NBL race.
- "Eric Rupe on...Turning Losses Into Wins" Super BMX September 1984 Vol.7 No.9 pg.38
- "Moto-Notes: Jawin' With Eric Rupe" BMX Action December 1984 Vol.9 No.12 pg.60
- "My Road To The NBL #1 Pro Plate" Super BMX & Freestyle June 1985 Vo1.12 No.6 pg.34 Story written by Eric Rupe.
- "Eric Rupe's Advice for Young Riders" Rad Gallery Spectacular July 1985 pg.28 A one-off issue published by Daisy Hi-Torque, the publishers of BMX Plus! magazine
- "The Champs: Eric Rupe" BMX Plus! April 1988 Vol.11 No.4 pg.40 One of six mini articles of the six ABA National No.1 winners of 1987.
- "Cook with Eric Rupe" BMX Action March 1988 Vol.13 No.3 pg.62
- Gold Cup West mini interview. American BMXer November 1989 Vol.11 No.10 pg.17 Very brief interview taken after win.
- "The Big Daddy of BMX" BMX Plus! April 1991 Vol.14 No.4 pg.24
- "BMXer For Life: The Life and Times of the 'Big Daddy'" Snap BMX Magazine June 1998 Vol.4 Iss.4 No.23 pg.80 Autobiographical article by Eric Rupe.
- "Eric Rupe: 32 years To Life Behind Bars" BMX World Magazine April/May 2006 Vol.1 Iss.3 pg.52 Very large article of the career of Eric Rupe. Foreword written by his brother Robby Rupe.
- Masters Cycling Summer 2008 A magazine targeting the older Cyclist. It featured Eric Rupe's BMX career in the older BMX classes.

== BMX magazine covers ==
Note: Only magazines that were in publication at the time of the racer's careers are listed, unless specifically noted.

Bicycle Motocross News:

- None

Minicycle/BMX Action & Super BMX:

- Super BMX Presents The 1985 World Championship Winter 1985. In fourth with #"1" on his helmet to Harry Leary's (85) behind/left. Leary is in the rear foreground in second to Gary Ellis's (47) in the lead. Brian Patterson is to Ellis's rear left in third. Also two unidentifieds (SBMX special edition).
- January 1988 Vol.15 No.1 (5) behind Gary Ellis (6). In inset Freestyler Denny Howell.(SBMX&F)

Bicycle Motocross Action & Go:

- July 1985 Vol.10 No.7 in insert with Mike Miranda following. Brad Birdwell main image.
- July 1987 Vol.12 No.7 (BMXA)

BMX Plus!:

- January 1983 Vol.6 No.1
- June 1984 Vol.7 No.6 main image. In insert Stu Thomsen.
- December 1984 Vol.7 No.12 (22) in insert with Clearance Perry (20) (top center). In other inserts Pete Loncarevich (73) & Anthony Sewell (13) (bottom center); freestylers Mike Dominguez (top left); Woody Itson (top right); Rick Avella (bottom left); Ron Wilkerson with Shawn Buckley clowning around.
- February 1985 Vol.8 No.2 in insert. Main image: Toby Henderson.
- April 1985 Vol.8 No.4 main image. In insert Harry Leary (2) & Eddy King (5).
- September 1986 Vol.9 No.9 in photo composite behind Greg Hill (1), Tommy Brackens and ahead of Gary Ellis (1) and unidentified (15). Freestyler Eddie Fiola "above" them.
- October 1986 Vol.9 No.10 In bottom insert (2) behind Pete Loncarevich (3) ahead of, Eddy King (6.) In upper insert Robby Rupe, Scott Towne, Billy Griggs, Dave Cullinan & Tim Ebbett. Main image Todd Anderson.
- November 1987 Vol.10 No.11 (5) with teammate Travis Chipres (8) following.

Total BMX:

Bicycles and Dirt (ABA publication):

- August 1984 Vol.2 No.9 (33) In insert behind Bart McDaniel (17), and ahead of Harry Leary (Diamondback). Racer Tim Judge and Freestyler Woody Itson in main image.

Snap BMX Magazine & TransWorld BMX:

- None

Moto Mag:

- None

BMX World:

NBA World & NBmxA World (The official NBA/NBmxA membership publication):

Bicycles Today & BMX Today (The official NBL membership publication under two names):

ABA Action, American BMXer, BMXer (The official ABA membership publication under three names):

- ABA Action March 1984 Vol.7 No.2 in the center with Robert Fehd on the right and unidentified racer to the left.

USBA Racer (The official USBA membership publication):

Specials:

- Masters Cycling Summer 2008. A Cycling magazine aimed at the older cycling enthusiast.
