= Stu Thomsen =

American bicycle motocross racer (born 1958)

Personal information
- Full name: Stuart L. Thomsen
- Nicknames: "Stompin' Stu", "The Man" ,"Stu Magoo"
- Born: May 20, 1958 (age 68) Whittier, California, United States
- Height: 1.87 m (6 ft 2 in)
- Weight: 90.7 kg (200 lb)

Cycling career
- Sport: Cycling
- Current team: Retired (represents SE Bikes)
- Discipline: Bicycle Motocross (BMX)
- Role: Racer
- Rider type: Off Road

Amateur teams
- 1974: Newport Design & Manufacturing, Inc.
- 1975: Dirtmaster Racing Products
- 1975–1976: Webco Inc.
- 1976: D.G. Performance Specialties
- 1976–1977: FMF
- 1999–Present: Redline (Reclassified Amateur)

Professional teams
- 1976–1977: FMF
- 1977–1979: SE Racing
- 1980–1983: Redline Engineering
- 1984–1986: Huffy Corporation
- 1986: Motobecane (MBK)
- 1987–1992: Stu Thomsen's Family Cycle Center
- 1987–1992: retired for six years
- 1992: Southridge Cycles
- 1993–: SE Racing

Stuart L. Thomsen (born May 20, 1958, in Whittier, California) is an American former bicycle motocross (BMX) racer.

Stu Thomsen was one of the first of the "Old School" of professional BMX racers who gained fame in the early days of the sport beginning in 1974. His prime competitive years were 1976–1985. Sometimes called the Babe Ruth of BMX for his prolific success and domination of BMX racing during the sport's early days from the mid-1970s into the mid-1980s, Thomsen's considerable career accolades and legacy remain a benchmark for modern sports achievement.

His nicknames, "The Man" and "Stompin Stu", were due in part to his size at 6 feet 1.5 inches and 200 lbs.

== Racing career milestones ==
Note: In the early days of professional racing, 1976 and prior, many tracks offered small purse prize money to the older racers of an event, even before the official sanctioning bodies offered prize money in formal divisions themselves. Hence early professionals like Stu Thomsen turning "pro" in 1975 at 16 years old racing for small amounts of money at track events when offered even before the NBA, regarded as the first true national BMX sanctioning body, had a professional division. The NBA started the first professional division in BMX in the 1977. For the sake of consistency and standardization noted professional first are for the first pro races for prize money offered by official BMX sanctioning bodies and not independent track events. Professional first are also on the national level unless otherwise indicated.

Milestone	Event details
Started racing:	Late 1973, 15 years old. He noticed a flyer about races at Scot Breithaupt's B.U.M.S track in Long Beach, CA. Since he didn't have a driver's licence he had a friend's father drive him to the track with some friends, looking to race in real competition. The track was holding a championship race of some kind.
Sanctioning body:	The proto governing body Bicycle United Motocross Society (B.U.M.S.)
Home sanctioning body district(s):	National Bicycle Association (NBA) District "X" (Orange/Los Angeles Counties) 1977–1981; American Bicycle Association (ABA) California 1 (CA-1) (1985)
First race bike:	
First race result:	Fifth place at Scot Breithaupt's Bicycle United Motocross Society (B.U.M.S.) track in Long Beach, California
First win (local):	
First sponsor:	Newport Design & Manufacturing, Inc.
First national win:	Yamaha Bicycle Gold Cup a.k.a. the Bicycle Motocross Championship of California State on September 14, 1974, as an Expert, age 16* He won a Yamaha Moto-Bike winning one of the three qualifiers and for winning the final event a Yamaha motorcycle. Strictly speaking, the Yamaha Gold Cup, as it is colloquially known, wasn't a national but the final of a series of four races (including the Final) held at different tracks based in California, but it was the first highly organized mass event in BMX involving a large number of racers and heavily promoted in the mass media in California. The first true National in which racers not from the state of California participated in and national points awarded to those out of state was the NBA Winter Nationals held in Phoenix, Arizona, on March 29, 1975.
Turned Professional**:	1975 Age 16
First Professional race result:**	
First Professional win:	Possibly at the National Bicycle Association (NBA) Jimmy Weinert Supernationals on "Weinert Mountain" at the Racing World course in Trabuco Canyon, California on April 3, 1977, when he won the Trophy Dash. It was a 100% payback race in which the racer gets back his entrance fee. This is one of the first officially sanctioned Pro BMX races held in BMX. Stu would go on to win about US$1,500 in 1977. the equivalent to US$5,349.01 in 2008 (Cost of Living Calculator).
Height and weight at height of his career:	Ht: 6' 1.5" Wt: 200 lbs.

Retired from Senior pro (NBL-"A"/ABA-"AA"): Even with the resources of his bike shop, Stu Thomsen's Family Cycle Center, competition in the expensive national circuit did not make economic sense unless he could find a factory sponsorship. Huffy's decision to let him go, his search for a sponsor frustrated by the depressed economic state of BMX that year, and a shoulder injury that his competitive nature prevented him from allowing to heal properly, all combined, led him to retire in July 1987. At age 29, he had largely made it his goal to race until he was thirty years old. However, he did race in large races that was both close to his Yorba Linda home and had large purses. For example, he did race at least once in 1988 at the ABA Winter Nationals at Chandler, Arizona, with a 4th and 7th in Pro Cruiser at the two races over that weekend. This is in addition to him racing locally close to his home. He raced in the 1990 ABA Fall Nationals and made the Pro Open Main in the Sunday race, coming in sixth. He also raced the 1991 ABA Fall Nationals as well along with fellow "retired" pros Eric Rupe and Harry Leary but did not make any of the Mains. He raced the Fall nationals again a year later reclassifying to "A" pro (along with Harry Leary) coming in third in Pro Cruiser on Day 2 (October 24). In 1993 he resumed racing on a serious level in Pro Cruiser and in the then new ABA Veteran Pro class for a few years. Today he still races occasionally as an amateur in the ABA 45-50 cruiser and 36 & Over Expert 20" class sponsored by Redline. His last Senior Pro win in the 20" division before retiring from serious Senior pro competition appeared to have been at the NBL National in Sarasota, Florida, on March 28, 1986.

*Classifications at the time were determined by size and weight and not age and proficiency, so his age in this case is irrelevant. The Yamaha Bicycle Gold Cup was the first "National" to be held in BMX.
**At the time there was no separate pro class for pros due to the relatively small number of pros. They raced with the 16 Experts, making it a Pro/Am class essentially. This is why during the early years of the pro division the national number one racer of a sanctioning body could be either an amateur or professional. This practice continued until the NBA's 1979 season in which the pros earned separate pro points and a separate pro plate from the amateurs. The NBL and ABA followed suit a year later for the 1980 season. These original Pro classes were the equivalent to Senior Pro/Elite Men at the time. In the following season, 1981, the pro class was divided into Junior and Senior levels in the ABA and NBL. The NBA remained with a single level pro class in 1981.

=== Career factory and major bicycle shop sponsors ===
Note: This listing only denotes the racer's primary sponsors. At any given time a racer could have numerous cosponsors. Primary sponsorships can be verified by BMX press coverage and sponsor's advertisements at the time in question. When possible exact dates are given.

==== Amateur ====
- Newport Design & Manufacturing, Inc.: ? – July 1974
- Dirtmaster Racing Products: July 1974 – August 1975.
- Webco Inc.: August 1975 – Late March 1976. Webco disbanded its team in March 1976.
- D.G. Performance Specialties (The initials stood for Dan Hangsleben, Gary Harlow): Late April 1976 – October 1976. Stu was kicked off the DG Team for bad-mouthing and abusing his DG issue bicycle after a poor showing in a race. Chuck Robinson, DG team manager, heard Thomsen's outburst. According to Jeff Bottema, Thomsen's teammate at the time, noted in the June 1977 issue of Bicycle Motocross Action, it was not the first time Thomsen had slighted DG and Mr. Robinson acted punitively on this alleged occasion, at least the second In a June 1978 interview in Bicycle Motocross Action, Stu said about the incident:
  ... I stayed with them (DG) for another year and then got ejected from the team somehow ... I don't even understand that.
  He reiterated this point five years later in an interview that appeared in the September 1983 issue of Bicycles And Dirt magazine:
  ... for some unknown reason I was dropped from the team. I never really found out why.
- Flying Machine Factory (FMF): October 1976 – Mid 1977. He joined FMF after leaving D.G. a week and a half later. Stu would turn pro with this sponsor.

==== Professional ====
- Flying Machine Factory (FMF): October 1976 – Mid 1977. FMF was created in part by Scot Breithaupt, a pioneer of the sport. He will later split from FMF and start Scot Enterprises Racing (SER). Stu Thomsen would leave FMF with Breithaupt.
- SE (Scot Enterprises) Racing: Mid 1977 – December 31, 1979.
- Redline Engineering: January 1, 1980 – December 31, 1983. After sometime on SE Racing he would move on to Redline. Financial reasons was the prime motivation as he explained in Bicycles And Dirt Magazine:
  BAD: Why Redline when you had been with S.E. for so long?
  Stu: At the time, pro racing had been going on for a few years, but the prize money wasn't all that big yet. Redline was a much bigger company than S.E. Racing. The dollar signs were what attracted me more than just wanting to change. I needed to get more out of racing if I was to stay in it any longer. The opportunity to earn money by riding someone's product, other than just going out and winning it, was a big push. I decided racing was what I wanted and I had to get the best I could out of it.
- Huffy Corporation (Huffman Manufacturing Company): January 1, 1984 – Early November 1986. Thomsen left Huffy in part because, according to the December 1986 issue of BMX Plus! Huffy decided to end the "Stu Thomsen" signature line of BMX bicycles.
- Motobecane (MBK): November 22–23, 1986. This was a one weekend sponsorship in France for the Bicross/Yop King of Bercy championship race in Bercy, France. It was not a permanent position nor was it meant to be.
- Stu Thomsen's Family Cycle Center: Late November 1986 – 1992 This is a Bicycle shop was started and was owned by Stu Thomsen beginning in November 1984 until approximately 1992.
- Largely retired for six years 1987–1992. Raced once or twice in the pro cruiser and 20" classes a couple of times a year for fun.
- Southridge Cycles: 1992 He resumed racing on a serious level starting in 1992 in Pro Cruiser and Veteran Pro.
- SE (Sports Engineering) Racing: January 1993–

==== Amateur ====
- Redline Bicycles: 1999–2014. He has reclassified himself as an amateur and represents Redline bicycles on the occasions he races.
- SE Bicycles: 2015–current. Stu rejoined SE and raced at Nationals on occasion.

=== Career bicycle motocross titles ===
Note: Listed are District, State/Provincial/Department, Regional, National, and International titles in italics. "Defunct" refers to the fact of that sanctioning body in question no longer existing at the start of the racer's career or at that stage of his/her career. Depending on point totals of individual racers, winners of Grand Nationals do not necessarily win National titles. Series and one off Championships are also listed in block.

==== Amateur ====
Independent Associations

- Late 1973 – 1974 Thomsen won a ten-week race series at Palms Park in Santa Monica, California, his first title.
- 1974 Yamaha Bicycle Gold Cup California State Expert Champion
- 1975 Western Sports Arena (WSA) No. 1 Expert

National Bicycle Association (NBA)

- 1977 Western States Champion
- 1977 15 – Up South Pacific BMX Championships Champion.
- 1977 16 Expert Grand National Champion.*

*In the early days of professional competition professionals still could race in the amateur 16 Expert class and win amateur titles. Therefore, Thomsen was both the Professional and 16 & Over Expert Grandnational Champion for 1977.

National Bicycle League (NBL)

- None

'National Pedal Sport Association (NPSA)

United Bicycle Racers (UBR)

- None

American Bicycle Association (ABA)

- 1977 16 Expert Gold Cup Winner.

==== Professional ====
National Bicycle Association (NBA)

- 1977 Open Pro-Am Grand National Champion
- 1977, 1978 National No. 1 Pro
- 1978 Jag Pro World Champion (NBA/NBL sanctioned)

National Bicycle League (NBL)

- 1981 "A" Pro Grandnational Champion
- 1981, 1982 National No. 1 Pro
- 1981 Knott's Berry Farm Pro Grand Champion (NBL, United Bicycle Racers (UBR) & World Wide Bicycle Motocross Association (WWBMXA) sanctioned.)

United Bicycle Racers (UBR)

- 1980 Pro Grandnational Champion

National Pedal Sport Association (NPSA)

- 1982 20" Pro Grandnational Champion
- 1986 Pro Cruiser National No. 3

American Bicycle Association (ABA)

- 1977 Open Pro* Gold Cup Champion.
- 1978 Pro Class Grandnational Champion
- 1979 Pro Money, Pro Trophy and 15 & Over Trophy Dash Grandnational Champion (triple)
- 1979 National No. 1 Pro. As a prize the ABA awarded him a white 1979 Chevrolet Van.
- 1980 National No. 3 Pro
- 1982 Pro Northwest Gold Cup Champion
- 1983 Pro Cruiser Grandnational Champion
- 1984 Pro Cruiser U.S. Gold Cup Champion

*He also won the 16 Expert Gold Cup. At this time the professional and the older amateur classes were not separate classes earning separate points. Professionals could still win amateur titles. The 1979 season was the first in the ABA for the professionals to have a separate points classification (measured in purse winnings), making them a separate class from the amateurs.

United States Bicycle Motocross Association (USBA)

- 1986 Pro Cruiser National No. 3

International Bicycle Motocross Federation (IBMXF)

- 1986 Pro Cruiser North American Continental Champion

Other Titles

- 1981 Jag Pro World Champion (No official BMX sanction). Sanctioned by the United States Cycling Federation, now known as USA Cycling. Various ABA and NBL track officials and scores aided.
- 1983 Jag Pro Cruiser World Champion (Non-sanctioned)

Pro Series Championships and Invitationals

- 1981 First Venezuelan National Championship Champion (American Class)

This was an exhibition invitational that Stu Thomsen and several other American professionals including (but not only) Greg Esser, Eric Rupe and Tim Judge went to at the request of the Venezuela BMX officials to promote and celebrate the Venezuelan Bicicross Association's first national Championship.

- 1984 Bicross International de Paris Bercy Champion (King of Bercy 1)*

*The International BMX Race of Bercy Paris was an invitational race sponsored by the Association Francaise de Bi-Crossing (AFB), the French BMX sanctioning body and was held in Bercy an eastern area in the city of Paris, France north of the river Seine. It was sponsored by the Yoplait Yogurt company and Bicross Magazine, a French BMX publication. As such it was also known as the Bicross de Paris Challenge Yop Champion (The Paris Yoplait BMX Challenge) in which American, English and German pros as well as French pros were brought together to compete in a single race. They were offered a 12-day all expenses paid holiday to compete in the race with a US$5,000 purse. As is typical in Europe, the public had greater enthusiasm for BMX than the American public, in part because bicycle racing of any type was and is much more popular in Europe (and in Asia and South America as well) than in the United States. Thirteen thousand spectators ventured into the Palais Omnisport de Paris Bercy (POPB) to watch a BMX race. In America you would be fortunate to seat 2,000. In the 1984 addition 330 racers were invited to France including United States professionals like Pete Loncarevich, Harry Leary Rod Beckering, Mike Miranda and Greg Hill in addition to Stu Thomsen. As it would be with the 1985 addition, which Tommy Brackens won, it was a hit in France with tickets sold out three months in advance.

==== Amateur ====
Note: Thomsen reclassified himself as an amateur in the late 1990s.

National Bicycle League (NBL)

- 2008 50-54 Cruiser Grand National Champion

American Bicycle Association (ABA)

- 1999 41-45 Cruiser Grand National Champion

=== Notable accolades ===
- He is one of the winners of the first nationally recognized BMX Championship (albeit a state Championship); the Bicycle Motocross Championship of California State a.k.a. The Yamaha Bicycle Gold Cup along with David Clinton (Junior Champion) and Bobby Watts (Novice Champion).
- He was named Rider of the Year by Bicycle Motocross News for 1977. Also named by BMX News as number one top rider of Southern California for 1977.
- He is a multiple winner of Bicycle Motocross Action magazine's Number One Racer Award (NORA) Cup:
  - 1979* with 1,040 votes or 25.13% of 4,140 votes cast.
  - 1981* with 1,208 votes or 32.7% of the votes cast. He received $500 as a cash prize and a personalized jacket.
- Thomsen is a winner of Super BMX Racer of the Year Award for 1982 via a reader ship survey in the October 1982 issue of Super BMX. No voter break down was given.
- He was the first pro to earn a National No. 1 plate twice and to do so consecutively (1977, '78 NBA)
- He was the first pro to win the No. 1 pro title with three different major sanctioning bodies (NBA, NBL, ABA).
- At least one book was published by him: "Stu Thomsen's Book of BMX" (1985)
- He was one of the founding members of the Professional Racing Organization (PRO).
- He is a 1986 inductee of the ABA BMX Hall of Fame.
- He is also a 1998 inductee of the United States Bicycling Hall of Fame, the first BMX racer to be so honored.
- He now a 2008 NBL BMX Hall of Fame inductee, making him the first BMXer to be inducted into the Hall of Fames of three major Cycling organizations.
- Thomsen is also credited with the first documented Aerial (180 degree turn in the air and returning in forward) in a skatepark in the late 1970s.
- Thomsen was featured in the BMX documentary "Joe Kid on a Stingray" in 2005. The title of the film was taken from a comment he made during an interview.

*In the early years of the NORA cup the year the balloting was done and tallied was the year it was considered awarded. In 1984 it was switched to when the winner of the cup was presented to the public in BMX Action magazine (usually in the February or March issue) the following year it was considered awarded and not during the closing months of the previous year when the voting and tally takes place. This was done to give the rider (and the winners of No. 1 bicycle and No. 1 Factory Team) maximum publicity and advantage financially. Therefore, under the new system Stu Thomsen was awarded NORA in 1980 and 1982.

=== BMX-related product lines ===
- 1977: The SE Racing Stu Thomsen Replica-1 (STR-1). The STR-1 was developed and tested by Thomsen. After Thomsen left SE Racing the frame was rechristened the "Quadangle."

Product Evaluation:

BMX Action January 1983 Vol. 8 No. 1 p. 14 Model year 1983
BMX Bi-Weekly Vol. 3 No. 13 p. 12 (British Publication) Model Year 1983
BMX Plus! August 1984 Vol. 7 No. 8 p. 33 Model year 1984

- 1982: Redline Stu Thomsen Replica STR Series "Stu Bars".
- 1984: The Huffy Stu Thomsen Model signature line frame and fork and complete bicycles.

product evaluation:

American BMXer September 1984 Vol. 7 No. 8 pp. 19, 21.
BMX Plus! December 1986 Vol. 9 No. 10 p. 28

- 1986: ODI Inc. Collector's Signature Series Grips.

=== Notable injuries ===
- Bad ankle sprain prior to competing in the Yamaha Bicycle Gold cup in September 1974. Competed on it and won his expert class.
- Broken Collarbone resulting from a football related Physical Education class at his high school in early 1975. He returned to competition at the Western Sport-A-Rama track in Orange, California, but promptly re-injured himself at that race fittingly on Friday, June 13, 1975.
- Broke leg in January 1976 during a practice session.
- Leg injury approximately May 1976. Returned to racing on June 27, 1976 for the NBA Springnational.
- Ankle injury in April 1984. Tore two ligaments falling in practice at a Memphis, Tennessee, NBL race. Laid up for approximately six weeks. Thomsen had a two national winning streak at the time and was showing signs of being dominant again after two off (for him) seasons. This injury hurt his 1984 season.
- Shoulder injury and a broken collar bone during practice at a promotional mountain bike race in the Los Angeles Coliseum during half time at the Super Bowl of Motocross motorcycle race on or around November 10, 1985. He was laid up for about six weeks.
- He reinjured his shoulder in a fall at an ABA national in Bakersfield, California, on April 6. Had surgery on April 22 and laid up for a further two months until late June 1986.

=== Images ===
Image of Thomsen racing at the 2008 NBL Grand National.

=== Racing habits and traits ===
- Rumors of impending retirement would repeatably emerge going virtually back to the beginning of his career:

Q: "What about rumors that you are getting ready to retire?"
A: "Just rumors. I may not race much anymore, but I will still like it very much."
—Bicycle Motocross News August 1975

This was almost just two years after he began racing. The cause of this was probably because at 17 Stu Thomsen was one of the oldest racers in BMX at the time. During this era BMX racing was still regarded exclusively as a kid's sport and at best a training ground and stepping stone to racing standard Motorcycle Motocross when they reached adulthood. Of course as part of the first generation Stu Thomsen would remain one of the oldest riders throughout his career. These persistent rumors—at times aided by his own statements—would regularly crop up as people wondered what is the outer age limit of a competitive racer in this new sport.

BMX Plus!: "When you were interviewed by BMX PLUS! last year you said you were going to retire at the end of 1979. In fact you said you were going to retire every year since 1976. Are you going to tell us the same thing this year?"
Thomsen: (Laughing) "I always say that. You know me."
—BMX Plus! January 1981

The question of his retirement would repeatedly arise until he actually retired at the beginning of the 1987 racing season.

- According to the November 1984 issue of the ABA's publication American BMXer Stu had the penchant to "grandstand" and make a situation like someone colliding with him worse than it was.

== Post-BMX career ==
- Beginning in 1988, Stu Thomsen competed in mountain bike racing on the National Off Road Bicycle Association (NORBA) circuit as other BMX racers had done and would later do including Tinker Juarez, Cheri Elliott, Pete Loncarevich and Toby Henderson. His biggest accomplishment in organized sponsored mountain Bike racing was his third-place finish in the downhill division at the 1988 World Mountain Bike Championships at Mammoth, California.
- He ran his bicycle shop, Stu Thomsen's Bicycle Center, with his wife Tanya for eight years. He decided to quit since it was in a highly competitive area with six or seven bike shops within a 10-mile radius of his. Despite being a good bike shop mechanic and was willing to dispense advice to other bike shop owners he didn't like being his own boss and sold his shop in 1992. He tried various sales jobs and was a counselor at a Family Fitness Center as a counselor but neither was successful and he went back to being a bicycle shop manager and bike mechanic (possibly Southridge Cycles in Riverside, California, one of his last sponsors at the time he briefly raced in Veteran pro class.) He naturally worked the BMX section of the store. That local shop with Thomsen as its mechanic would help maintain at least some of the bikes the Riverside Police Department had for their Bicycle Patrol program. That was the possible catalyst for his interest in law enforcement.
- He is now a Sheriff's Deputy in Orange County, California, making him literally "The Man" (a prison slang term that could be a pejorative that was created around 1950 for the prison warden. It came into mass usage in the 1960s referring to the powers that be that runs society or their servants such as those in law enforcement). When he was a bike shop manager/mechanic at a local shop in Riverside, California, he would help maintain bicycles for the local police department. Later he would move to a new house. His new next-door neighbor happened to be a Fullerton Police Department officer with whom he became friends. Then in 1994, after another sales job didn't work out, another friend of his went to take the Orange County Sheriff's Department test since they were hiring new deputies at the time. Thomsen decided to "tag along". As they waited in line while his friend took the test, Thomsen himself decided to take it. Thomsen passed while his friend failed and his career in law enforcement started in the Orange County Sheriff's Department.

Thomsen would manage to merge his love of racing with law enforcement, competing in the California Police Olympics (in the year 2000 the name was changed to the California Police and Fire Games after Firemen were invited to compete). From 1995 to 2000 he was undefeated in the Mountain Bike racing division, accumulating 15 gold medals during that time. He also participated in the 1997 World Police and Fire Games, in Canada winning four Gold Medals In addition to competitions he is part of the Project 999-Memorial Ride, the yearly 630-mile trek of around 45 Orange County Peace Officers who ride their road bicycles from the California Peace Officers' Memorial in Sacramento, California, to the Orange County Peace Officers' Memorial in Santa Ana, California, in tribute of the officers who fell in the line of duty serving the people of California in general and Orange County in particular. The ride, usually held in the last week of May each year, also in support of the Project 999 Fund which raises money for the families of the fallen and seriously injured. In 2009 Stu Thomsen and his 44 colleagues raised $40,000. "It is the least I can do to pay homage to those who paid the ultimate price," he said.

Thomsen, in addition to being on the Bicycle Patrol Team, is on the Critical Incident Response Team (CIRT) and in 2005 was in training to be on the K-9 and as of that date was a K-9 agitator, i.e. play-acts the role of a fleeing, attacking or non compliant felon for the dogs to attack and hold in training of dogs and their handlers. During his 15-year tenure as an Orange County Deputy he has never used physical force directly against anyone but he has been under fire and earned the Medal of Courage as he relates in a 2009 article in Garage Magazine:

I have never hit anybody with my baton. I have never had to tase anybody, and I haven't shot my hand gun at anyone. I was involved in a shooting where I had to shoot a rifle. I am part of a first responder team, and we were responding to a call of a reported shooting. I couldn't see him. He was a sniper shooting at us, and I shot in the direction of the gun fire. I was laying down cover fire for my partner. I wasn't hurt, but my partner was hit. He was hit two times in the arm and has since fully recovered ... it was about an eight-or nine-hour ordeal. The suspect ended up getting shot. The whole thing was on the news. That incident earned me a 'Medal of Courage'.

- Thomsen still races for fun occasionally. For example, he raced the amateur 41-45 cruiser at the November 2001 ABA Grand Nationals in Tulsa, Oklahoma, and won. He also raced in the 36 & Over Expert 20" class as well as the 45-50 Cruiser class at the ABA Winternationals in February 2007. He made the mains but didn't place in the top three of either class in the mains, but his competitive spirits remained undimmed:

Stu said he'll be training more and plans on racing again this year. 'I still hate losing,' he said. 'I guess I'll always be that way.'

As proof of that, he won the 50-54 Cruiser main at the 2008 NBL Grand National, amazing onlookers with his jumping ability.
