= Bargaintown, New Jersey =

Populated place in Atlantic County, New Jersey, US

- Census-designated place
- Location within Atlantic County. Inset: Location of Atlantic County within New Jersey. Bargaintown (New Jersey) Bargaintown (the United States)
- Coordinates: 39°21′45″N 74°34′52″W
- Country: United States
- State: New Jersey
- County: Atlantic
- Township: Egg Harbor

Area
  - Total: 2.59 sq mi (6.71 km^{2})
  - Land: 2.55 sq mi (6.60 km^{2})
  - Water: 0.042 sq mi (0.11 km^{2})
- Elevation: 30 ft (9.1 m)

Population (2020)
  - Total: 5,360
  - Density: 2,100/sq mi (812/km^{2})
- Time zone: UTC−05:00 (Eastern (EST))
  - Summer (DST): UTC−04:00 (EDT)
- Area code: 609
- FIPS code: 34-02920
- GNIS feature ID: 2804147

Bargaintown is an unincorporated community and census-designated place (CDP) located within Egg Harbor Township, in Atlantic County, in the U.S. state of New Jersey. The Egg Harbor Township municipal building is located in Bargaintown, about 0.25 mi (0.40 km) east of the Garden State Parkway.

It was first listed as a CDP in the 2020 census with a population of 5,360.

== History ==
Bargaintown was laid out by a property developer who hoped the value would increase quickly, but when it did not, he sold the lots cheaply. The community has since been called Bargaintown.

The area is serviced by the Bargaintown Volunteer Fire Company #2 which was established in 1932 and has two stations located in the community. Station 1 is located at 6550 Mill Road and Station 2 is located at 1 Tony "Mink" Pagano Drive.

== Demographics ==
Historical population
Census	Pop.	Note	%±
2020	5,360		—
U.S. Decennial Census; 2020

Bargaintown first appeared as a census designated place in the 2020 U.S. census.

=== 2020 census ===
As of the 2020 census, Bargaintown had a population of 5,360. The median age was 44.1 years. 23.6% of residents were under the age of 18 and 19.6% of residents were 65 years of age or older. For every 100 females there were 92.1 males, and for every 100 females age 18 and over there were 89.1 males age 18 and over.

100.0% of residents lived in urban areas, while 0.0% lived in rural areas.

There were 1,936 households in Bargaintown, of which 32.8% had children under the age of 18 living in them. Of all households, 61.0% were married-couple households, 11.4% were households with a male householder and no spouse or partner present, and 22.9% were households with a female householder and no spouse or partner present. About 20.0% of all households were made up of individuals and 12.7% had someone living alone who was 65 years of age or older.

There were 1,997 housing units, of which 3.1% were vacant. The homeowner vacancy rate was 0.7% and the rental vacancy rate was 3.5%.

Bargaintown CDP, New Jersey – Racial and ethnic composition Note: the US Census treats Hispanic/Latino as an ethnic category. This table excludes Latinos from the racial categories and assigns them to a separate category. Hispanics/Latinos may be of any race.
Race / Ethnicity (NH = Non-Hispanic)	Pop 2020	% 2020
White alone (NH)	3,965	73.97%
Black or African American alone (NH)	238	4.44%
Native American or Alaska Native alone (NH)	2	0.04%
Asian alone (NH)	341	6.36%
Native Hawaiian or Pacific Islander alone (NH)	4	0.07%
Other race alone (NH)	33	0.62%
Mixed race or Multiracial (NH)	241	4.50%
Hispanic or Latino (any race)	536	10.00%
Total	5,360	100.00%

== Education ==
The CDP is in the Egg Harbor Township School District.
