= JMC Bicycles =

American bicycle company

JMC, or Jim Melton Cyclery was a bicycle company in the 1970s and 1980s. It started as a bicycle shop in 1969. It began manufacturing bicycle components in 1974, mostly to make a bicycle look more like a motocross motorcycle, including fenders and false fuel tanks. In 1977 JMC began manufacturing BMX bicycles. During the 1970s and 80's, it sponsored such notable BMX racers, such as Harry Leary, Clint Miller, Tinker Juarez, and Darrell Young, Danny Farmer, Andy Patterson, Solan Foster, Gary DeBacker, Melanie Cline, Carl Butler and Sam Arellano.

By 1979 the bicycle shop was sold and the company owned just the factory. Sales peaked in 1981 when it was number two of the American Bicycle Association title for top BMX factory team three years in a row. Jim Melton closed the company in July 1985 because of his wife Vera's poor health, and the company faced tough competition from cheap BMX-bikes made in Taiwan, and he did not want to move production abroad. Jim Melton died in late July, 2014.

== Models ==
The JMC Black Shadow was light weight with a black black finish. The most sought after models today are the Darrell Young pro model and the Andy Patterson pro model.
