= Harry Leary =

American bicycle motocross rider (1959–2024)

Personal information
- Full name: Harry Clarence Leary Jr.
- Nicknames: "Scary Harry Leary", "Turbo"
- Born: February 22, 1959 Lynwood, California, U.S.
- Died: September 7, 2024 (aged 65) Arizona, U.S.
- Height: 1.68 m (5 ft 6 in)
- Weight: 76 kg (168 lb)

Cycling career
- Sport: Cycling
- Current team: Peak Performance Institute BioLab Sciences
- Discipline: Bicycle Motocross (BMX)
- Role: Racer/Team Manager
- Rider type: Off Road

Amateur teams
- 1974–1975: Coates Schwinn Bike Shop
- 1976–1977: JMC Racing Equipment
- 2007: Reclassed to Amateur
- 2007–2024: GHP/Applied BMX Training

Professional teams
- 1977–1980: JMC Racing Equipment
- 1980–1992: DiamondBack
- 1992: SE Racing
- 1993–1995: Balance Sports
- 1995–2000: Leary Dirtwerx
- 2001–2003: Marzocchi
- 2003: Specialized
- 2003–2005: Cutting Edge
- 2006–2007: SPR Schwinn
- 2007–2015: GHP
- 2015–2020: BOX/THRILL
- 2020–2024: Peak Performance Institute BioLab Sciences

Major wins
- 1986 Porsche Design Pro Series

Harry Clarence Leary Jr. (February 22, 1959 – September 7, 2024) was an American professional bicycle motocross (BMX) racer.

== Biography ==
Leary started racing on July 30, 1974, aged 15. He turned professional in 1977, aged 18, as a founding member of the Professional Racing Organization (PRO) racers guild. His prime competitive years were from 1978 to 1985. He officially retired from BMX Senior pro ("AA" in the ABA and "A" (Elite Men) in the NBL) racing in 1989, and for the previous three years he was largely inactive and served as Diamond Back's factory team manager. He came out of "retirement" in the early 1990s to race in the ABA's Veteran Pro class. In 2007 he ended his professional career and reclassified himself as an amateur, aged 48.

Leary's career was plagued by many injuries, in particular his knees which cut many promising seasons off and required surgery. Also, he had trouble dealing with the fame, as limited to the BMX world as it was, that his career brought. He went as far as to attend a sports medicine clinic for stress management in July 1984. He met many stars of the more established sports at the facility. The stresses that come with the burden of fame was and is a widespread if little discussed aspect in the career of a top amateur or professional athlete.

Perhaps despite his attendance of the clinic, Harry Leary could never really get the psychological aspect of the sport, similar to Tommy Brackens but even more so. In addition, while Tommy had a problem with attitude but remained physically healthy for the vast majority of his career, Harry had both mental attitude and physical injury to contend with. His physical misfortunes often happened when he was on a streak of doing well, cutting promising seasons off, perhaps a No. 1 season.

=== Awards ===
He never won a major title as a top amateur or professional, his biggest win being the $5000 first place award at the 1982 Murray World Cup. He won a measure of redemption when he won back to back ABA Veteran Pro No. 1's in 1993 & 1994 against many of his 1980s peers. He later raced well into his 40s in The Veterans Pro class (which is similar in concept to golf's Champions Tour). In October 2007 he reclassified as an amateur and 30 years of professional racing came to an end. He raced in the 56 & Over Expert Class. He raced as recently the ABA So. Cal. Nationals on February 16, 2008, in 36 & Over Expert Class coming 7th place in an eight-man main in that 20" division but first place in the 24" 46-50 Cruiser Class.

=== Significant injuries ===
- Tore the medial meniscus cartilage in his left knee when fellow pro Clint Miller ran into him in a race at the July 24, 1982, NBL/IBMXF Huffy World Championship in Dayton, Ohio. It laid him up for ten weeks, cutting off a promising racing season. Unfortunately he re-injured the knee at the ABA North Bergen, New Jersey East Coast Nationals in the following October. He had to undergo arthoscopic knee surgery and was laid up for a further two months, not racing again until December 20, 1982, on the local level. He was not back up to race form until mid 1983. The two injuries effectively put him out of contention for almost one full year.
- Severely bruised a shoulder in a crash at an ABA national in Shreveport, Louisiana, in February 1984. He sat out a few nationals.
- Ruptured a ligament in his knee in the Norco, California NBL National on Sunday June 19, 1988, and was laid up for approximately four weeks.

=== Racing habits and traits ===
Leary had a reputation of being as, Snap BMX Magazine put it, "High Strung", i.e. having a volatile temper. He was nicknamed "Scary Harry Leary", and later "Turbo"; the former was for his aggressive racing style, the latter was a moniker coined by Bicycle Motocross Action magazine when he "Turboed" himself into finishing National No. 2 in both the American Bicycle Association (ABA) and the National Bicycle League (NBL) in 1981 after being relatively far back in the national standings during that year.

He was the first BMX racer to have his signature physically printed on a BMX bicycle, the Harry Leary Turbo.

== Death ==
Leary died of heat exhaustion in Arizona, on September 7, 2024, at the age of 65.

== BMX magazine and general media interviews and articles ==
- "Harry Leary" BMX Plus! July 1980 Vol.3 No.7 pg.16
- "Pictorial: Scary Harry Leary" Bicycle Motocross Action August 1980 Vol.5 No.8 pg.46 Several shots of Harry.
- "Front Brake Secrets" Bicycle Motocross Action October 1981 vol.6 no.10 pg.90 Leary's tips on how to use a front brake effectively.
- "Harry Leary" Action Now October 1981 Vol.8 No.3 pg.62 Short Article.
- "From has-been to HERO: Harry Leary" BMX Plus! February 1982 Vol.5 No.2 pg.18
- "Top Pros Speak Out" BMX Action April 1982 Vol.7 No.4 pg.62 Joint interview with Stu Thomsen, Greg Hill, Kevin McNeal, Eric Rupe, Brent Patterson, and Scott Clark, speaking about various issues facing the racing world.
- A Harry Leary sidebar. BMX Action September 1982 Vol.7 No.9 pg.53
- "Harry Leary Professional" ABA Action October 1982 Vol.5 No.10 pg.26 A sidebar outlining a charitable contribution of Leary's.
- "Leary Flies" BMX Action Bike October/November 1982 Iss.4 pg.33
- "Turbo Harry Leary" BMX Action May 1983 Vol.8 No.5 pg.35 Résumé/Curriculum Vitae (CV) type article of accomplishments and vital statistics.
- "Diamond Back's Pro, Harry Leary" Super BMX June 1983 Vol.10 No.6 pg.22
- "Harry & Eddy" BMX Action February 1984 Vol.9 No.2 pg.46 Joint Harry Leary and Eddy King interview.
- "Crankin' Conversations With The Turbo Hisself, Harry Leary." BMX Action February 1985 Vol.10 No.2 pg.44
- "The Kellogg's Pro Series" BMX Plus! October 1985 Vol.8 No.10 pg.61 Harry Leary himself wrote this account of his and other racers for this invitational race series in Birmingham, England.
- "Home Starting Gates" BMX Plus! July 1986 Vol.9 No.7 pg.39 Article about a home electronic starting gate product with Harry Leary testing.
- "Coming Back: Diamond Back's Harry Leary" BMX Plus! June 1992 Vol.15 No.6 pg.22 Sidebar mini-interview on Harry Leary's comeback in pro racing.
- "Rebuttal" Ride BMX October 1993 Vol.2 Iss.5 No.7 pg.42 (Note: Ride BMX did not number it pages at this time) This is the controversial joint rebuttal issue with Greg Hill refuting issues raised by BMX Dirt Jumper Chris Moeller's interview in the previous issue of Ride BMX magazine (August/September 1993 Vol.2 Issue.4 No.6).
- "harry leary" Snap BMX Magazine May/June 1996 Vol.3 Iss.3 No.10 pg.68 Leary discusses his Vet pro career, his bicycle company.
- "Leary Dirtwerx" Snap BMX Magazine September/October 1996 Vol.3 Iss.5 No.12 pg.58 Combination article about Leary and his company and product evaluation
