= Bobby Encinas =

American cyclist (born 1961)

Personal information
- Full name: Bobby Encinas
- Born: 1961 (age 64–65) Canoga Park, California, U.S.
- Height: 1.63 m (5 ft 4 in)
- Weight: 61 kg (134 lb)

Cycling career
- Sport: Cycling
- Current team: Retired
- Discipline: Bicycle Motocross (BMX)
- Role: Racer/Promoter/Teaching Professional
- Rider type: Off Road

Amateur teams
- 1973-1974: Pedaler's West Bike Shop
- 1974-1975: Kawasaki Motors
- 1975: Rick's Bike Shop
- 1975-1977: Shimano Sales Corporation

Professional teams
- 1977-1981: Shimano Sales Corporation
- 1982-1983: Scorpion BMX
- 1983-: Larry Wilcox Actionline

Bobby Encinas (born 1961) is an American former professional "Old School" Bicycle Motocross (BMX) racer whose prime competitive years were from 1973 to 1980. He was one of the first superstars in BMX and one of its most savvy promoters. Raised in the barrio of Canoga Park, he had a juvenile criminal record for theft and was on probation for consuming alcohol and drugs before he was 12 years old. He credits BMX for saving him from a life of crime. As a result he devoted much of his BMX career and after to promoting the sport at the grass-roots level, training kids in his BMX clinics, of which he was a pioneer, and launching future BMX careers and winning the respect and love of the BMX world.

== Racing career milestones ==
Note: In the early days of professional racing, 1976 and prior, many tracks offered small purse prize money to the older racers of an event, even before the official sanctioning bodies offered prize money in formal divisions themselves. Hence some early "professionals" like Stu Thomsen turning "pro" in 1975 at 16 years old where racing for small amounts of money at track events when offered even before the NBA, regarded as the first true national BMX sanctioning body, had a professional division. The NBA started the first professional division in BMX for the 1977 season. For the sake of consistency and standardization noted professional first are for the first pro races for prize money offered by official BMX sanctioning bodies and not independent track events. Professional first are also on the national level unless otherwise indicated.

Started Racing: Officially in mid 1973 at age 12 at Soledad Sands Park BMX track in Acton, California. According to the July 1974 issue of Bicycle Mototcross News he was racing by the time of publication 10 months. He was one of the children that were pretending to be racing Motorcycle Motocross (MX) an MX promoter, Ernie Alexander, noticed one day during the summer of 1973. That experience led Alexander to eventually start the National Bicycle Association (NBA) some six months later. Prior to that, it was David Clinton and Marvin Church who introduced him into the sport prior to racing in sanctioned races. As with many of the very first BMXers they were devoted Motorcycle Motocross (MX) fans and like to pretend they were racing motorcycles, attaching various accoutrements like false fuel tanks and fenders, emulating their favorite MX idols.

First racing bike: Schwinn Sting-Ray

Sanctioning body: Independent.

Sanctioning body district(s): NBA Southern California District X (1975–1981).

First race result: Last.

First win (local):

First sponsor: Peddler's West Bike Shop in mid 1973.

First national win: He won the very first Sidehack class with Thom Lund at the very first National on March 29, 1975 at the NBA Winternationals in Phoenix, Arizona. In the individual 20" class he came in second place to John George in 14 & Over Expert class. His first solo 20" win was in the 14–17 Expert Class at the National Pedal Sport Association (NPSA) Eastern Nationals in Atlanta, Georgia on September 7, 1975.

Turned professional: 1977

First Professional race* result:

First Professional** win:

Retired: He had essentially went into semi retirement in 1979 after winning the NBA Southern California District No. 1 title in 1978. Starting in the 1979 season he concentrated mostly on the Public Relations aspect of BMX to promote it nationally and internationally. He retired from 20" racing in after the 1980 racing season, but he would race in the 20" pro class again to aid in his teaching tours and to keep in shape, restarting with the 1981 National Bicycle Motocross Association (NBmxA) (formerly known as the National Bicycle Association (NBA)) Western States Championship in Fresno, California. He continued to race Cruisers competitively until 1983.

Height and Weight at the height of his BMX career (1977): Ht:5'4 (approx) Wt:135 lbs.

*At this time there was no separate pro class for pros due to the relatively small number of pros. They raced with the 16 Experts, making it a Pro/Am class essentially. This is why during the early years of the pro division the national number one racer of a sanctioning body could be either an amateur or professional. This practice continued until the NBA's 1979 season in which the pros earned separate pro points and a separate pro plate from the amateurs.
**At the time of Encinas turning pro there was not a two tier structure of pros i.e. Junior and Senior pro class.

=== Factory and major bike shop sponsors ===
Note: This listing only denotes the racer's primary sponsors. At any given time a racer could have numerous co-sponsors. Primary sponsorships can be verified by BMX press coverage and sponsor's advertisements at the time in question. When possible exact dates are given.

==== Amateur ====
- Pedaler's West Bike Shop: Mid 1973-July 31, 1974.
- Kawasaki Motors: August 1, 1974-Late 1974. Apparently left Kawasaki under poor circumstances—. There seemed to be a hint of friction between Kawasaki and its team if this quote is to be any guide:
  "Anonymous rumor: Kawasaki, you'd better bridge the communications gap with your team or... ----reported by Bob Osborn in the September 1976 "The California BMX Rider"
- Rick's Bike Shop: Late 1974-1975
- Shimano Sales Corporation: 1975-December 1981. He was their very first sponsored racer. He would turn pro with this sponsor.

==== Professional ====
- Shimano Sales Corporation: 1975-December 1981. He was also the team Captain
- Scorpion BMX: February 1982-December 1983
- Larry Wilcox Actionline: January 1983- . Strictly speaking this was not a sponsorship as much as being an employee. Encinas became a teaching pro and spokesman with this BMX apparel company that Larry Wilcox, the former co-star of the 1977–1983 American television show "CHiPs" (Wilcox left the show in 1982) fame owned. He continued his touring BMX teaching clinic that he had conducted for the previous five years under the Wilcox name.

=== Career bicycle motocross titles ===
Note: Listed are District, State/Provincial/Department, Regional, National, and International titles in italics. "Defunct" refers to the fact of that sanctioning body in question no longer existing at the start of the racer's career or at that stage of his/her career. Depending on point totals of individual racers, winners of Grand Nationals do not necessarily win National titles.

==== Amateur ====
National Bicycle Association (NBA)

- 1975 National No.2. It was a controversial finish since Bobby won two nationals and came in eighth in a third while David Clinton came in with a second, an eighth and a first. In spite of the record David Clinton received the no.1 plate, even after Encinas was declared winner of it originally.
- 1976 Sidehack Western States Champion with partner John George.
- 1976, 1978 Southern California District No.1 and California State Champion.

National Bicycle League (NBL)

- 1980 29 & Under Cruiser Grandnational Champion*

*At this time Cruiser class was a Pro/Am class. Professionals raced with the amateurs but only won trophies.

American Bicycle Association (ABA)

- None

United Bicycle Racers (UBR)

- None

United States Bicycle Motocross Association (USBA)

- None

International Bicycle Motocross Federation (IBMXF)

- None

==== Professional ====
National Bicycle Association (NBA)

- 1979 Southern California District No.1

National Bicycle League (NBL)

- None

American Bicycle Association (ABA)

- None

United Bicycle Racers (UBR)

- None

United States Bicycle Motocross Association (USBA)

- None

International Bicycle Motocross Federation (IBMXF)

- None

Pro Series Championships

=== Notable accolades ===
- He had once owned the very first BMX Products/Mongoose racing frame. Unfortunately he lost it after it fell off the back of a truck.
- With Thom Lund, he won the very first Sidehack class at the very first NBA National on March 29, 1975 in Phoenix, Arizona
- Received the Sportsmanship Trophy in 1975 after Scot Breithaupt accidentally knocked him into a mud hole during the NBA Tri-State Championship in Tucson, Arizona on March 30, 1975 (the second day of the very first nationals ever held), almost drowning in the process.
- Bobby had the original idea of not only becoming an active spokesman for BMX while sponsored by a major BMX component maker, as was Scot Breithaupt previously, but to become one at the grass roots level. Shimano Sales Corporation sent him to bicycle trade shows on Public Relations tours around the nation. While doing so, he hit upon the idea of helping directly introducing children to the world of BMX directly since he was one of the first pioneers of BMX, there was no one to help him when he was a beginner. He promoted the sport of BMX at schools and BMX tracks across the country feeling that nationals were for the "bigger and wealthier kids" and the sport need to remember the "little guys". His Bobby Encinas Tour in 1980 was the first major coordinated swing around the country making 30 stops at schools and BMX tracks traveling 22,000 miles. It was his idea to tutor up and coming racers in the sport he loved. Donny Atherton was one of his first and most famous disciples in 1977. The culmination of his Tours was the international 1981 Bobby Encinas World BMX Tour and Pro Racing School in which he held training schools in several nations including Sweden, Australia and New Zealand as well as making time for a United States summer tour leg before going to Japan and back to Europe.
- Encinas was the very first winner of Bicycle Motocross Action's Number One Rider Award (NORA) in 1978* He won a Bell RT open faced helmet that was custom painted by Mike Vils plus US$150 cash prize from the magazine itself. No voter totals or breakdown provided.
- He was one of the founding members of the Professional Racing Organization (PRO) racers guild in 1977.
- He is a 1987 ABA BMX Hall of Fame Inductee.

*In the early years of the NORA cup the year the balloting was done and tallied was the year it was considered awarded. In 1983 it was switched to when the winner of the cup was presented to the public in BMX Action magazine (usually in the February or March issue) the following year it was considered awarded and not during the closing months of the previous year when the voting and tally takes place. This was done to give the rider (and the winners of No.1 bicycle and No.1 Factory Team) maximum publicity and advantage fancily. Therefore under the new system Bobby Encinas was awarded NORA in 1979.

=== Significant injuries ===
- Two broken wrists in 1976. The first while trail riding his Yamaha YZ-125 motorcycle. Someone cut him off and he grabbed his front brake too hard, reacting as racing a bicycle. The second happened on a bicycle track in approximately September. He raced the last months of the 1976 season in a cast.

=== BMX product lines ===
- 1977 Mongoose "Bobby Encinas Replica" BMX frame and fork set (shown as a complete bicycle).

Product Evaluation:

=== Racing traits and habits ===
- He never won a National Bicycle Association (NBA) national during his career on the 20-inch bicycle. He did win several sidehack races at nationals with his partner John George. He also did win the Cruiser Class at the 1980 NBA Grand National on the 26 incher but he never won on the twenty on the national level with the NBA. He did win a $3,000 purse at a 1980 National Bicycle League (NBL) National in Pittsburgh, Pennsylvania on the 20-inch bicycle, earning him an interview on the evening national news magazine program P.M. Magazine. He never felt that he had missed something never winning a title and only a few individual races on the national level. He once said:

"I've never won an NBA National, but I've won plenty of championships. You don't have to be a National champ to be a winner." --Super BMX April 1981

== Post BMX career ==
For the rest of the 1980s Mr. Eincinas continued his career as a teaching Pro instructing young BMX racers at various tracks across the country as he did as an active competitive pro. He always reached out to kids to get involve in BMX to possibly keep them from falling into the same type of trouble he did as a young boy, being involved in petty crimes including shoplifting and stealing bicycles. As noted, he credits BMX for saving him from a life of crime.

"If it hadn't been for BMX I'd probably still be in the barrio smoking, lying, drinking and stealing." "We all need to remember the little guys, the small kids. They're the future of this sport. That's who I'm really doing it all for." --Both Bobby Encinas Super BMX April 1981.

As far back as the summer of 1974 when he had only been racing for ten months, Bicycle Motocross News predicted that he would be the Henry Kissinger of BMX:

"We fell that a manufacturer would not only be getting an expert rider, but a great public relations person - perhaps the Henry Kissinger of bicycle motocross!" --Bicycle Motocross News July 1974.

Several BMX superstars have followed in Bobby Encinas's footsteps, including Perry Kramer and Mike Poulson. Greg Hill's Speed Clinics are a modern descendant of Bobby's first works.

== BMX press magazine interviews and articles ==
- "Personality Profile: Bobby Encinas" Bicycle Motocross News July 1974 Vol.1 No.2 p. 6
- Minicycle/BMX Action September 1976 Vol.3 No.9.
- "Ask the Experts...: 'What type of tires do you use?'" BMX Plus! January 1979 Vol.2 No.1 p. 51 Brief article on what brand and size of tires he uses racing.
- "The Bobby Encinas Story" Bicycle Motocross Action April 1978 Vol.3 No.2 p. 34
- "BMX Is My Life" Super BMX April 1981 Vol.8 No.4, p. 37

== BMX magazine covers ==
Bicycle Motocross News:

- October 1974 Vol.1 No.5 with David Clinton
- January 1975 Vol.2 No.1 with David Clinton, John George and Jack Shannon.
- March 1978 Vol.4 No.3 behind John George. This was the last issue of BMX News published.

Minicycle/BMX Action & Super BMX:

- April 1981 Vol.8 No.4 main image. Racer Tim Judge in top corner insert.(SBMX)

Bicycle Motocross Action: & Go

- June 1977 Vol.1 No.3 (BMXA)
- September 1979 Vol.3 No.7 (BMXA)
- February 1981 Vol.6 No.2 (54) second from right in fourth place behind John Crews (53) leading, Scot Breithaupt (23) in second, Kenny Nachman (142) in third, and ahead of Seth Buccieri (5) in fifth.

BMX Plus!:

- None

Total BMX:

Bicycles and Dirt: (ABA Publication)

- None

NBA World & NBmxA World (The official NBA/NBmxA membership publication under two names):

Bicycles Today & BMX Today (The official NBL membership publication under two names):

ABA Action, American BMXer, BMXer (The official ABA membership publication under three different names):
