= Billy Griggs =

Road cyclist from the United States of America

Personal information
- Full name: William Luther Griggs
- Nickname: "Mr. Bill"
- Born: September 16, 1968 (age 58) Anaheim, California, U.S.
- Height: 1.78 m (5 ft 10 in)
- Weight: 79.4 kg (175 lb)

Cycling career
- Sport: Cycling
- Current team: Retired
- Discipline: Bicycle Motocross (BMX)
- Role: Racer
- Rider type: Off Road

Amateur teams
- 1981-1982: BS Bikes
- 1983: CW Racing
- 1984: Schwinn Bicycle Company
- 1984-1985: Mongoose
- 1985-1987: Redline Engineering

Professional teams
- 1987-1990: Redline Engineering
- 1990-1992: Haro Designs/Cycles
- 1992-1993: Iron Horse
- 1994: Haro Bicycles
- 1997-1998: Shimano
- 1998-2001: GT Bicycles

Luther William Grigs (b. September 16, 1968 from Anaheim, California U.S.) is an American "Old School/Mid School" former professional Bicycle Motocross (BMX) racer whose prime competitive years were from 1985 to 1996.

His nickname was "Mr. Bill" which was a play on his name and an allusion to a late 1970s Saturday Night Live skit called "The Mr. Bill Show." Billy Griggs had a more successful career than most, winning two World Championships during his amateur days, but did not quite make it to the top in pro although he would consistently make the mains.

== Racing career milestones ==
Note: Professional first are at the national level unless otherwise indicated.

Milestone	Event Details
Started racing:	January 21, 1981 at 12 years old.
Sanctioning body:	American Bicycle Association (ABA)
Home sanctioning body districts):	ABA California 14 (CA-14) 1982-1985
First race bike:	
First race result:	Third in 12 Beginner class.
First win (local):	
First sponsor:	BS Bikes in Santa Ana, California.
First national win:	
Turned Professional:	February 1987 at 18 years old.
First Professional race result:	Fourth place in "A" pro on Saturday, February 14 at the 1987 American Bicycle Association (ABA) Winter Nationals in Scottsdale, Arizona. He won USD$135.
First Professional win:	At the 1987 ABA Winter Nationals in "A" pro on Sunday, February 15. He won US$640.
First Junior Men/Pro* race result:	See "First professional race result".
First Junior Men/Pro win:	See "First Professional win".
First Senior Pro** race result:	Third Place in "AA" pro at the ABA Silver Dollar Nationals in Reno, Nevada on May 24, 1987. He won US$140.
First Senior Pro win:	In "AA" pro at the ABA Lumberjack Nationals in Eugene, Oregon On July 25, 1987. He also won Pro Open, doubling and he doubled again the next day. No purse break down given.
Height and weight at height of his career: (1991)	Ht:5'10" Wt:175 lbs.
Retired:	Griggs retired from full-time AA pro racing in July 1995 after he took a Research and Development position at GT Bicycles. He would race occasionally in "AA" pro until his last "AA" equivalent pro race at the UCI World Championships in Cordoba, Argentina on the weekend of July 29, 2000.

*In the NBL it is "B" Pro/Superclass/"AA" pro depending on the era; In the ABA it is "AA" pro.
**In the NBL "A" Pro/Elite Men; in the ABA it is "AA" pro.

=== Career factory and major bicycle shop sponsors ===
Note: This listing only denotes the racer's primary sponsors. At any given time a racer could have numerous ever-changing co-sponsors. Primary sponsorships can be verified by BMX press coverage and sponsor's advertisements at the time in question.

==== Amateur ====
- BS (Brian Scura) Bikes: 1981-1982.
- Basset Racing 1982.
- CW (Custom Works) Racing: May 1982-December 1983. "CW", regarding the bicycle manufacturing firm, never stood for "Coast Wheels" as it is widely thought. Coast Wheels was a bike shop that Roger Worsham owned. Custom Works was a completely different and independent company. This is in contrast with JMC (Jim Melton Cyclery) which did start out as a bicycle shop and then began manufacturing its own BMX components including entire bicycles.
- Schwinn Bicycle Company: January 1984-Mid June 1984. Schwinn dropped Billy Griggs because Griggs was not using Schwinn equipment. As Griggs explained in an interview in the February 1985 issue of Super BMX & Freestyle:
  SBMX: So you're saying you had no bicycle to race?
  Billy Griggs: "I had a bike to race but it wasn't what I would consider a race bike. It would be fine for a novice or a beginner. I was riding a fully short stock frame. I tried to ride a Sting for a while but I just didn't like it. They understood that and they let me try a different frame they made. But you know I prefer Flight cranks any day over one-piece cranks, and the other frame they made was too wide in the rear section for Flights, they just hit the frame, and so I didn't want to ride that bike. It was also too short in the front end by three inches easy, it was really a small bike."
  SBMX: Yet you won quite a few races on Schwinn bicycles.
  B.G.: No I didn't, the bike I had was made by Voris Dixon.
  SBMX: It said Schwinn.
  B.G.: That's just it, it said Schwinn, but that's as far as it went. I had to put Schwinn stickers on it because I had to fool everyone with it.
  SBMX: Were you fooling the people at Schwinn?
  B.G.: For a while. At first they didn't mind it but then when the Schwinn dealers started asking for that bike and they couldn't supply it, then the problem started."
  SBMX: So did Schwinn leave you or did you leave Schwinn?
  B.G.: They called me up and gave me a choice: Either put a Sting together or a bike we make and stay on the team, or don't do it and I wouldn't be on the team anymore.
  He opted to leave the team in part because it would have taken too long to adjust to a bike with a Schwinn manufactured frame.
- Mongoose (BMX Products): June 24, 1984 – September 1, 1985
- Redline Engineering: September 2, 1985 – December 31, 1990 Billy would turn pro with this sponsor.
- Billy Griggs was also employed as a BMX Plus! test rider from July 1984-June 1992.

==== Professional ====
- Redline Engineering: September 2, 1985 – December 20, 1990. Left under very good circumstances, even praise by Billy Griggs.
- Haro Designs/Cycles: December 21, 1990.-December 1992.
- Iron Horse: December 1992 – 1993
- Haro Bicycles: 1994-December 1995
- Shimano: November 1997-September 1998
- GT (Gary Turner) Bicycles: January 1999 – September 2001 Billy Griggs was employed by GT Bicycles in Product development and race tested in AA pro many prototype frames and components on a part-time basis .

=== Career bicycle motocross titles ===
Note: Listed are District, State/Provincial/Department, Regional, National, and International titles in italics. "Defunct" refers to the fact of that sanctioning body in question no longer existing at the start of the racer's career or at that stage of his/her career. Depending on point totals of individual racers, winners of Grand Nationals do not necessarily win National titles. Series and one off Championships are also listed in block.

==== Amateur ====
National Bicycle Association (NBA)

- None

National Bicycle League (NBL)

- 1984 15 Cruiser National No.1

American Bicycle Association (ABA)

- 1982 California District No.14 Cruiser No.1
- 1982 California District 14 No.1
- 1983 15 Expert National No.1 Amateur (National No.2 Amateur Overall)*
- 1983 Cruiser National No.3
- 1985 16 Expert Winter Season California District 14 (CA-14) District Age Group (DAG) No.1

*Beginning with the 1983 season the ABA instituted age class rankings, much like NBL practice. However, the overall National No.1 Amateur title was retained. Doug Davis was overall National No. 1 Amateur for 1983.

United States Bicycle Motocross Association (USBA)

- 1984 15-16 Cruiser 7-UP World Champion** (USBA promoted & sanctioned)

**The 7-UP World Championship race was the direct descendant of the Jag BMX World Championship races held from 1978-1983. Renny Roker, the promoter of the JAG BMX World Championship gave the rights to the WC to the USBA in 1984 in return for the cable television rights.

International Bicycle Motocross Federation (IBMXF)

- 1984 15 Cruiser Murray World Cup III Champion

Other titles

- 1983 14-15 Cruiser Champion Jag BMX World Super Bowl Champion (Non-Sanctioned).

==== Professional ====
National Bicycle Association (NBA)

- None

National Bicycle League (NBL)

- 1989 National No.3 Pro

American Bicycle Association (ABA)

- 1988 Yamaha Supercup Pro Champion. As a prize he won a Yamaha 350 "Big Wheel" off-road motorcycle.
- 1990 "Pros in Paradise" series winner (third series)
- 1990 National No.2 Pro

United States Bicycle Motocross Association (USBA)

- None

International Bicycle Motocross Federation (IBMXF)

- None

Pro Series Championships

=== Notable accolades ===
- Named the Sixth of the 25 Hottest amateurs in BMX racing by a 1984 survey conducted by BMX Plus! for the opinions of four prominent figures in BMX: Two racers, Brent Patterson and Mike Poulson; and two team officials: Dr. Gary Scofield of GT, Howard Wharthon of Diamond Back.
- Named one of eight top amateurs deemed top "Pros of the Future" by Super BMX & Freestyle magazine along with Eric Carter, Mike King, Doug Davis, Matt Hadan Brent Romero, Darwin Griffin and Brad Birdwell.
- Named one of the new BMX Action's "Terrible Ten" top amateurs and future professionals for 1986.

=== Significant injuries ===
- Suffered a separated shoulder during a practice run before the pre-race at the 1985 ABA Land of Lincoln Nationals in Springfield, Illinois on April 27, 1985. Laid up for approximately seven weeks until the NBL/IBMXF Murry World Cup race in Nashville, Tennessee in mid June.
- In 2008 Griggs had surgery to repair a valve in his heart. Apparently his heart had been pumping less than normal volume of blood for all his life including his BMX career. On the BMX Action Online discussion site he discusses his repair with a poster:

"My ticker is awesome, thanks for asking....I wish the valve repair I had was available 20 years ago....who knows what a difference it could havemade in my career having my heart actually pump the full amount of blood with every beat!"

=== Miscellaneous ===
- Named number four on the list of the "Dirtiest Riders in BMX" in the June 1992 issue of BMX Plus!

=== Post BMX career ===
In 2013 Griggs was inducted into the prestigious National BMX Hall of Fame.

Griggs was responsible for developing the Ultra Box Series frame design, alongside Gary Turner, and has welded up plenty of custom frames for top Pros - including the GT frames ridden by Mike Day and Jill Kintner in the 2008 Olympics.

== BMX and magazine covers ==
Bicycle Motocross News:

- None

Minicycle/BMX Action & Super BMX:

- November 1983 Vol.10 No.11 In inset celebrity actor David Hasselhoff. Griggs also appears in a centerfold poster with celebrity actress Missy Gold. (SBMX)

Bicycle Motocross Action & Go:

- February 1986 Vol.11 No.2 (BMXA)
- August 1987 Vol.12 No.8 with Eddy King and Charles Townsend. (BMXA)
- March 1988 Vol.13 No.3 (BMXA)
- August 1990 Vol.1 No.10 (Go).
- November 1990 Vol.2 Iss.1 behind Steve Veltman, and ahead Traves Chipres and Mike King In insert John Paul Rogers (Go).
- May 1991 Vol.2 No.7 with Mike King (Go).

BMX Plus!:

- July 1983 Vol.6 No.6* Insert. Maine Image Dave Gianunzio.
- January 1985 Vol.8 No.1 in circle insert ahead of Eddy King testing bikes. Mian image: freestyler Marc McGlynn.
- August 1985 Vol.8 No.8 with Mike Miranda, Harry Leary, Pete Loncarevich, Robert Fehd and Scott Clark in separate inserts and together on a starting line in the top insert.
- January 1986 Vol.9 No.1 in bottom insert wearing Redline uniform. In separate inserts Shawn Carmody (top) (53); Tony Adams (BMX Plus! Tester); freestylers Mike Buff (CW), Mike Dominguez (Hutch) and Ron Wilkerson (Haro).
- October 1986 Vol.9 No.10 in upper insert in center. to his left is Robby Rupe & Scott Towne. To his right Dave Cullinan & Tim Ebbett. In bottom insert Pete Loncarevich (3) ahead of Eric Rupe (2), Eddy King (6.) Main image Todd Anderson.
- May 1988 Vol.11 No.5 In circular insert at bottom. Main image freestyler Dino Deluca plus unidentified spectator.
- October 1988 Vol.11 No.10 In circular insert (8). Main image: Dirt Jumper Tim "Fuzzy" Hall.
- July 1989 Vol.12 No.7 main image. Freestyler Dave Voelker, Mike Miranda in top insert Lake Jumping with spectators. in middle insert freestyler Woody Itson with models Liz Corey (sitting on ground) and Danielle Shields.
- August 1989 Vol.12 No.8 in main image third from foreground in the lead. In foreground Eric Carter (Schwinn) with Travis Chipres (Mongoose), Matt Hadan (obscured silver black/blue helmet), Mike King (obscured in silver/black helmet with "1") behind and to Grigg's immediate right) and GT's Mike Ellis. Also in top insert with aforementioned.
- October 1989 Vol.12 No.10 in insert with Brandon Allen (left Diamondback) and Todd Blaser (right Dyno). Mian image freestyler Jay Miron.
- August 1992 Vol.15 No.8 (5) in insert with Greg Hill (3) and four unidentifieds (8), (64), (53) and (51). Main image freestyler Jimmy LeVan.
- May 1993 Vol.16 No.5 with Pete Loncarevich and Matt Hoffman (Inset).
- February 1994 Vol.17 No.2 (6) ahead of Gary Ellis (2) and unidentified third place racer (55).
- September 1994 Vol.17 No.9 with Justin Green (1).
- February 1998 Vol.21 No.2 with Robert MacPherson and T.J. Lavin in insert.

*Due to a change in ownership BMX Plus! did not publish a May issue in 1983.

Total BMX:

- None

Bicycles and Dirt:

- None

BMX World (1990 Version)

- November 1990 Vol.1 No.1 (Premier issue)

Snap BMX Magazine & Transworld BMX:

- September 1994 Vol.1 Iss.1 (Snap)

Moto Mag

BMX World (2005 version):

NBA World & NBmxA World (The official NBA/NBmxA membership publication):

Bicycles Today & BMX Today (The official NBL membership publication under two names):

ABA Action, American BMXer, BMXer (The official ABA membership publication under three names):

- American BMXer January/February 1985 Vol.7 No.12
- American BMXer August 1985 Vol.7 No.6
- American BMXer December 1986 Vol.8 No.11 in USBA Racer* section pg.48 Technically not a cover but would have been if USBA Racer remained an independent organization. Griggs is ahead of Jason Kraig (foreground) and an unidentified racer (obscured). It was the last cover of USBA Racer.

USBA Racer (The official USBA membership publication):

*After the ABA acquired the USBA the ABA printed the USBA paper within American BMXer beginning with the May 1986 issue.

== BMX press magazine interviews and articles ==
- "Griggs & CW" BMX Action December 1983 Vol.8 No.12 pg.68
- "NBL National Number 1's" Bicycles Today January 1985 Vol.7 No.1 pg.15 Short biographical blurb in sanctioning body newspaper for becoming NBL national no.1 15 Cruiser in 1984.
- "Mr. Bill" Super BMX & Freestyle February 1985 Vol.12 No.2
- "Charlie & Billy" BMX Action August 1987 Vol.12 No.8 pg.58 A joint interview with Charles Townsend.
- "On the Cover...Billy Griggs" BMX Action March 1988 Vol.13 No.3 pg.59
- "Billy's Birthday Bash: The Coming of Age" Freestylin'/BMX Action January 1990 Vol.1 Iss.3 pg.41
- "Trading Places: Mikey King and Billy Griggs tell all!"BMX Plus! June 1991 Vol.14 No.6 pg.62 A joint interview with Mike King.
- "billy griggs interview" Snap BMX Magazine May 1998 Vol.5 Iss. No.22 pg.92
