= Cheri Elliott =

American bike racer

Personal information
- Full name: Cheri Elliott
- Born: April 17, 1970 (age 56) Citrus Heights, California, U.S.
- Height: 5 ft 3 in (160 cm)
- Weight: 110 lb (50 kg)

Cycling career
- Sport: Cycling
- Current team: Retired
- Disciplines: Bicycle Motocross (BMX); Mountain bike
- Role: Racer
- Rider type: BMX: off road MTB: dual slalom, downhill

Amateur teams
- 1980-1981: JR Racing
- 1982: Boss Racing Frames
- 1983-1985: Skyway Recreations
- 1986: Retired for 3.5 years
- 1989-1990: Bicycle Center USA

Professional teams
- 1994-1995: KHS Bicycles
- 1996: Mountain Cycle/Quaker
- 1996: Mountain Cycle/Maxxis
- 1997-1998: Maxxis/Azonic/Intense
- 1999: Maxxis/Azonic/Tomac
- 2000-2001: Maxxis/ODI/Azonic/Intense

Cheri Elliott (born April 17, 1970) is an American former champion female bicycle motocross (BMX) racer in the 1980s, and a champion Downhill and Slalom mountain bike racer in the 1990s and early 2000s. During her BMX career, she spent most of her racing career on the national circuit with the Skyway Recreation factory team. She had a relatively short BMX career, but she is a four-time national champion and four-time world champion, including three consecutive National Number One girl-racer titles for the American Bicycle Association (ABA) from 1983 through 1985. She also held the regional UBR Number one girl racer title in 1982. She was the first female racer inducted into the ABA BMX Hall of Fame in 1989, and the first female BMX racer inducted into the United States Bicycling Hall of Fame in 2008.

== Biography ==
Elliott snow-skied when she was two years old.

Elliott's BMX career lasted from 1980 until 1986, and saw a brief comeback in 1989.

From an early age, she was not only dominant in the girls division of BMX (formerly called "Powder Puff"), but was also usually competitive with boys in her age group. An athletic strawberry blond with deep dimples when she smiled, Elliott was approximately five feet tall in the seventh grade, making her somewhat larger than most of the boys in her class at Will Rodgers Intermediate Junior High School and the boys at the BMX track.

During her racing career—and while in the sixth grade of junior high school—Elliott was asked to play "first string"' on the varsity senior high school Basketball team. She helped that high school team win a championship. She continued pursuing other sports during her BMX career, and after leaving the sport in 1986.

Elliott was named Most Valuable Player in both basketball and volleyball during her senior year of high school.

She also played in her college freshman year at the University of the Pacific.

== BMX racing career ==
When there weren't enough girls in her age group at a particular BMX race to form out a separate class, she often raced with them, winning "Motos" (the qualifying heats) and "Opens" (the class that was open to both male novices and experts, and where girls were free to race each other). She would frequently make the "Mains"—the race final that would decide the winner for the day—in the boys division. Even when there were enough girls to form a class, she still often participated with the boys in the United Bicycle Racers (UBR) "11 Expert" class, complaining that the girls were "too slow". At a 1981 UBR National held in Laguna Seca, California, she raced in the 14-and-over girls' competition, despite being only 11 years old at the time, "because the 12-to-13 is too easy".

UBR rules at the time stated that if a girl raced in the boys' expert classes, she could not race in the girls' class. As a result, she mostly raced in the boys' Expert and Open classes. She also frequently participated in, and sometimes won, the "Trophy Dash"—the final event of a race, in which the winners of two closely related age classes and the three skill classes (Note: Novice, Intermediate, and Expert in the ABA; Rookie, Novice, and Expert in the NBL.) participate in an exhibition race that has no effect on the rider's yearly ranking. Unlike the UBR and the National Bicycle League (NBL), the ABA did not allow girls to compete in the boys' Expert Class until 1984. The ABA did allow her to run in the Trophy Dash and 12-and-under Cruiser Class. She often won on the local level, occasionally beating the male Experts—the highest amateur class. In the 1982 ABA Grand National, she placed second in the Cruiser Class, beaten by only Danny Steplight. She also won a few Trophy Dash races on her 20-inch bike at the national level; she won the 11-12 Trophy Dash at the 1983 ABA Cajun Nationals in Shreveport, Louisiana in January 1983, overpowering 12 Expert winner Jason Griggs, who had dominated his age class throughout 1982 and 1983. She was, at the time, the only girl to win the Trophy Dash at an ABA national that anyone could recall.

Elliott excelled in Quarter Pipe BMX freestyle trick riding, which at the time was unusual for a girl. She was also one of the few girls at the time who could do a "Table Top", where the rider, after launching herself high into the air off a steep ramp or berm, lays the frame of her bike parallel with the ground and righting the bike again before landing.

Elliott's BMX career was relatively short, lasting only six years. Elliott retired from twenty-inch BMX racing early in the 1986 season, right after the ABA Supernationals (which were held on January 26 and 27). Explaining the reason for her decision, Elliott said "I did all I wanted to do. I wanted to quit last year, but I thought about getting ABA No. 1 two years in a row. And I did it—that was my goal." (Elliot misspoke about-or BMX Action misprinted-the number of consecutive number-one plates she was going for. It was three years in a row, not two.) She also wanted to pursue and concentrate on scholastic sports, like basketball.

Elliott told BMX Plus!, in their June 1986 issue, that Skyway Recreations, the factory racing team that sponsored her, dropped their racing team after the 1985 racing season. The year 1986 was known to racers as "the year of no sponsorships" because some bicycle manufactures who sponsored racing teams, like Torker and JMC, went out of business—due, in part, to low cost Asian imports. The teams sponsored by Diamond Back and Redline were pared back, and Skyway dropped their sponsorship altogether, in favor of either creating or expanding BMX Freestyle teams.

Elliott did race in one National in 1986: the ABA Supernationals in late January, where she placed fourth in the 15 & Over Girls class. As the BMX periodical BMX Action put it, "after being casually released from Skyway, [she] decided it was easier to just quit the sport while on top than shop for a ride." In 1996, she would co-author a book called The Athlete's Guide to Sponsorship during her subsequent mountain-bike racing career.

=== Women's professional BMX racing ===
The NBL introduced the girls' pro class in the 1985 season, and continued it through the 1987 season. Elliott did not turn professional, because she retired at age 15 when the minimum required age to turn pro was 16. She did express interest in the pro class: "There needs to be a pro class for the girls so we will have more interest in the sport."

She was happy when the NBL's Competition Congress authorized a pro girls' class in late 1984: "I think it's great that they finally passed it... Now girls will have something to stay in the sport for." When the pro Girls' class started at the beginning of the 1985 season, only girls 16 years of age and older qualified to compete in it. Elliott was only 15 years old on April 17, 1985.

As Elliott put it during an interview conducted by her modern day counterpart, professional cyclist Jill Kintner, on Kintner's blog:

When I retired from BMX in 1985 [sic], I was ready to go live a normal teenager life. I had been racing since 9 years old, I was 15 and felt I had missed a lot. I was absolutely exhausted. My career may not have been long, but it was intense and filled to the extreme. I was ready to pass the torch to the other women. I was ready to be home.

— Cheri Elliott, to Jill Kintner

=== BMX retirement ===
After almost four years, Elliott came out of retirement on the national level on Saturday October 28, 1989, when she raced the ABA's Fall National in Yorba Linda, Californiaapparently for the fun of it due to her ABA BMX Hall of Fame induction the following November. She probably thought she would be at the ABA Grand Nationals anyway for her acceptance speech, why not race as well? Other reports have it that Elliott was lured out of retirement by the Bicycle Center bicycle shop as a "spoiler" to better position other Bicycle Center racers to take various titles. Whatever the reason, prior to the Fall Nationals she was seen practicing at the Roseville, California Oak Creek BMX track. She dominated the 15 & Over girls' class at the Fall Nationals on Saturday. However, she slipped her pedals in the Main and finished in seventh place—last, in this case—in the main. On Sunday, she again came in last (out of six) in the main.

Elliott was on the verge of winning her 15 & Over girls' Main at the 1989 ABA Grand Nationals in Oklahoma City, Oklahoma; however, fate bit her again as it did at the Fall Nationals. She fell doing a trick over a jump. She landed badly, and crashed. The rest of the pack passed her, and her chance of being the Grand National winner went with them. Mapuana Naki won the National number one girl title for 1989. Elliot was not in contention for the title, since she did not resume racing until October 1989. After racing one or two more times on the national level, Elliott continued her BMX retirement in February 1990.

=== Professional mountain bike racing ===
Retiring from BMX did not cure her entirely of the racing bug. After college and a five-year retirement—nine years, if you do not count her two races in 1989— she went on to mountain bike racing (MTB) in 1994.

MTB, a sport similar to BMX that uses bicycles with 26-inch wheels similar to the "cruiser class" bicycles in BMX circa 1980, has courses that are much longer and on steep, downhill slopes, with certain events—especially snow racing—resembling downhill skiing. Races could last up to 10 minutes (compared to BMX's 30 to 40 seconds), with speeds hitting 70 miles per hour (110 km/h) (compared to BMX's 25 to 35 mph (40 to 56 km/h) for experts and professionals). In her first year of racing mountain bikes, Elliott became the national dual slalom champion, the first such championship of many.

Over her cycling career, Elliott has won 14 major world and national titles, including four National Off Road Bicycle Association National Championships and two ESPN X Games gold medals. However, she did not race in the revived NBL "supergirls" class, its professional girls' division, when it was recreated in 1997, dedicating her time to dual slalom and downhill MTB.

As she was starting her MTB racing career, she obtained a Bachelor of Science degree in business (with honors), concentrated in real estate and finance, in 1994.

=== Post cycling career ===
Elliott retired from competitive racing during the 2001 mountain bike season, becoming a Realtor in California; she bills herself as "The Broker on a Bike". She is also a public speaker, a helmet-safety advocate for children, and co-owns and runs her own sports management company, JED Sports Management.

Burnout played a role in her decision to retire, along with the more pressing question of injury.

In mountain biking, really the "same" feeling. In 2001 I was 31, and I was ready to be home. I crashed one too many times my last couple years of MTB, and I was just physically and mentally done. The last two years of MTB I was already phasing into my new career with studying for the California Real Estate Broker’s Exam. So, I was definitely ready when the time was right.

— Cheri Elliott, to Jill Kintner

A few years after she retired from Mountain Bike competition, she considered another comeback in BMX, despite her career-ending back injury. She contemplated coming out of retirement for the 2008 Summer Olympics in Beijing, China, where BMX racing was making its Olympic debut:

I actually considered coming back to BMX a couple of years ago for the Olympics. I secretly called a gal I personally knew at Haro about that thought, and she supplied me with a bike to do a little "secret" training just to see if I felt I could come back. I even communicated with Mike King about the Olympics at one point. He was very intrigued about that possibility. I secretly trained out at Roseville BMX during the off hours. I know the owners of the track out there and they allowed me the privilege to train when nobody else was around. I kept it very hush hush. Although I was able to bring the skills right back and it almost seemed possible, my spinal cord was not appreciating the pounding and pulling. Was a fun thought; however, again not worth the risk. I chose not to pursue it. All that Olympic stuff stayed a "secret"… until this interview.

— Cheri Elliott, BMX Action Online, February 12, 2008

She chose not return, for health reasons.

== Career BMX milestones ==
Milestone	Event details
Started racing	March 1980, at 9 years of age.
First race result	First place in 9 & Over Girls class in Prairie City, California.
First win (local)	See above.
Home sanctioning body district(s)	National Bicycle Association (NBA) District "N" (Northern California) 1980–1981 American Bicycle Association (ABA) California District 11 (CA-11) 1980-1986, 1989
First sponsor	JR Racing, local sponsor (1980–December 1981)
First national win	1980 United Bicycle Racers (UBR) national in 9–10 girls. She also took a third in 9–10 open, and raced in 10 Expert, but did not make main.
First national win against boys	January 17, 1982 UBR Bay Area National, beating Mark Perez in 11 Expert.
Turned professional	No Professional Career (Note: It was restarted at the beginning of the 1997 racing season.)
Height and weight, at peak of her career	Height: 5 ft 1 in (1.55 m); Weight: 110 lb (50 kg)
Retired	After the ABA Supernationals which were held on January 27, 1986. She made a brief two race comeback in late 1989 for a few months of racing, including the ABA Fall Nationals and the ABA Grandnationals that year, while being awarded her BMX Hall of Fame Induction. She raced at least once very early in the 1990 season on the national level, and then retired again. She pursued Mountain Bike Racing for four years thereafter.

=== Career BMX factory and major bicycle shop sponsorships ===
Note: This listing only denotes the racer's primary sponsors. At any given time a racer could have numerous ever changing co-sponsors. Primary sponsorships can be verified by BMX press coverage and sponsor's advertisements at the time in question. When possible exact dates are given.

==== Amateur ====
- JR Racing: 1980-December 1981
- Boss Racing Frames: January 1982-December 1982
- Skyway Recreations: January 1, 1983 – December 31, 1985
- Retired from BMX racing for approximately 3.5 years (Early 1986-Late 1989).
- Bicycle Center USA (bike shop): October 1989-February 1990. This was a brief two-race comeback for BMX Hall of Fame Induction awarded at the ABA Grand Nationals in November 1989. She resumed her retirement in early 1990.

==== Professional ====
- No pro career

=== Career bicycle motocross titles ===
Note: Listed are District, State/Provincial/Department, Regional, National, and International titles in italics. "Defunct" refers to the fact of that sanctioning body in question no longer existing at the start of the racer's career or at that stage of his/her career. Depending on point totals of individual racers, winners of Grand Nationals do not necessarily win National titles.

==== Amateur ====
National Bicycle Association (NBA)

- None

National Bicycle League (NBL)

- 1981 11-13 Powder Puff Knott's Berry Farm Grand Champion (NBL, United Bicycle Racers (UBR) & World Wide Bicycle Motocross Association (WWBMXA) sanctioned.)
- 1983 12-13 Girls Grandnational Champion
- 1984 14-15 Girls Grandnational Champion
- 1984 National No.1 14-15 Girl.

American Bicycle Association (ABA)

- 1982 11-12 Girls Northwest Gold Cup Champion
- 1982 11-12 Girls Grandnational Champion
- 1982 11-12 girls Jag World Champion (ABA sanctioned)
- 1983 13-14 Girls U.S. Gold Cup Champion.
- 1983 13-14 Girls Grandnational Champion
- 1984 13-14 Girls U.S. Gold Cup Champion.
- 1984 California District 11 (Cal-11) No.1 Girl.
- 1984 13-14 Girls International Super Bowl of BMX Class Champion.
- 1984 13-14 Grandnational Champion
- 1985 15 & Over Girls Grandnational Champion
- 1985 15 & Over Girls National No.1
- 1983, 1984, 1985 National No.1 Girl.

United Bicycle Racers Association (UBR)

- 1981 12-13 Girls Grandnational Champion
- 1982 National No.1 Girl.

International Bicycle Motocross Federation (IBMXF) (Note: Beginning in 1991, the IBMXF and the FIAC—the amateur cycling arm of the UCI—had been holding joint World Championship events as a transitional phase of their merger, which began in earnest in 1993. Beginning with the 1996 season, the IBMXF and FIAC completed the merger; both ceased to exist as independent entities, being integrated into the UCI. Beginning with the 1996 World Championships held in Brighton, England, the UCI officially holds and sanctions BMX World Championships, and with it inherited all precedents, records, streaks, etc. from both the IBMXF and FIAC.)

- 1983 12-13 Girls Murray World II Cup Champion
- 1985 15 Girls Murray World Cup IV Champion
- 1985 14-15 Girls World Champion

Other titles

- 1983 12-13 Girls Jag World Super Bowl Champion (Non sanctioned)

=== Notable BMX accolades ===
- Named the seventh of the 25 Hottest Amateurs in BMX racing by a 1984 survey conducted by BMX Plus!, from the opinions of four prominent figures in BMX: Two racers, Brent Patterson and Mike Poulson; and two team officials: Dr. Gary Scofield of GT and Howard Wharthon of Diamond Back.
- She is the first girl to earn two overall national number-one girl titles consecutively (1983, 1984 ABA), and the only girl to do so three times consecutively (1983, 1984, 1985 ABA).
- In 1989, she became the first woman to be inducted into ABA BMX Hall of Fame.
- In 2008, she became the first BMX woman to be inducted into the United States Bicycling Hall of Fame.
- In 1985, she became the only female ever put on BMX Action's official list of suggested racers to be selected for voting in the magazine's Number One Racer Award (NORA) Cup for best racer of the year.

=== Racing habits and traits ===
- Elliott had the physical quirk of unconsciously bobbing her head up and down slightly when she raced.

=== Notable BMX injuries ===
- Elliott is one of the few top BMX racers to escape serious injury during her BMX career, in contrast to her Mountain Bike racing career.

=== Post-BMX career ===
- After her last BMX race in late 1989, which came after a four-year hiatus, she became a mountain bike racer in 1993.

== Mountain Bike Racing Career Milestones ==
Note: Professional first are on the national level unless otherwise indicated.

Milestone	Event details
Started racing	1993 at 23 years of age. In the Summer of 1993 she saw in a bicycle shop a copy of VeloNews magazine and ran across and article about pro dual slalom races. She called a friend who was driving up to a NORBA National event Vail, Colorado and that friend invited her to come along to give it a try. She accepted. After a second race in Mammoth, California. Somewhat intimidated by the courses and speeds of Downhill MTB, she left the sport not expecting to race again but did so again after a six-month layoff, determined to conquer her fears.
First race result	Did Not Transfer, at a Vail, Colorado event in Summer 1993.
Sanctioning body	National Off-Road Bicycle Association
Retired	2001, at age 31, due to career ending injuries, including one to her spinal cord.

=== Career MTB titles ===
Note: Listed are Regional, National and International titles.

==== Amateur ====
- No amateur status.

==== Professional ====
National Off Road Bicycle Association (NORBA)

- 1994 & 1995 National Dual Slalom Champion.
- 1997 National Downhill Champion.
- 1998 National Dual Slalom Champion.
- 2000 United States Dual Slalom Champion

ESPN X-Games

- 1995 Women's Summer Speed Downhill Gold Medalist.
- 1995 Women's Summer Dual Downhill Gold Medalist.
- 1997 Women's Winter Speed Downhill Gold Medalist.

Union Cycliste Internationale (UCI)

- 1998 Women's Downhill World Champion Bronze Medalist

=== Notable MTB accolades ===
- During the 1997 and 1998 seasons, Ms. Elliott won the Guinness World Record for most X-Games Medals attained in Mountain Biking.

=== Notable MTB injuries ===
- 1994 Broken Right Thumb
- 1995 Received two concussions
- 1996 Right Shoulder AC Separation
- 1997 Broken Right Elbow
- 1999 Finger injury
- 2000-2001 Spinal Cord Annular Tear and Retrolisthesis L5-S1 (forced retirement) This was the instance in which she broke her back at event at Mammoth, California in 2001. She walked away from the crash but started having partial paralysis in her leg a few days later.
  I crashed big time in Mammoth, Ca. I walked away from the crash. However, I didn’t know I broke my back until a couple days later when my right leg started having partial paralysis. Several x-rays, MRI’s and months of physical therapy later, I decided it was time to hang up the wheels. I felt I dodged a bullet, and I didn’t want to dodge any more. I never had surgery, but most likely will need surgery later on in life.
  — Cheri Elliott, BMX Action Online, February 12, 2008
