= Charles Townsend (BMX rider) =

American bicycle motocross rider

Personal information
- Full name: Charles Heath Townsend
- Nicknames: "Choo-Choo Charlie", "Amtrak"
- Born: January 25, 1967 (age 59) Kansas City, Kansas, United States of America
- Height: 1.88 m (6 ft 2 in)
- Weight: 88.5 kg (195 lb)

Cycling career
- Sport: Cycling
- Current team: Retired
- Discipline: Bicycle Motocross (BMX)
- Role: Racer
- Rider type: Off Road

Amateur teams
- 1981: Woodside Bicycle Shop
- 1985: U.S. Boss Racing Products
- 1985: Free Agent
- 1985–1986: Hutch Hi-Performance

Professional teams
- 1986: Hutch Hi-Performance
- 1987: Cyclecraft
- 1987: CW Racing
- 1987–1988: Revcore
- 1988–1989: Diamond Back
- 1990–1991: Powerlite
- 1991–1998: Robinson Racing Products
- 1999–2000: Troy Lee Designs
- 2000: Airborne
- 2000–2001: Kona/Rocket Cash.Com
- 2003: Phantom Bikes
- 2004: Advent

Charles Heath Townsend (born January 25, 1967, in Kansas City, Kansas) is an "Old School/Mid School" former professional Bicycle Motocross (BMX) racer whose prime competitive years were from 1985 to 1996. He has 2 kids.

He has various nicknames, many dating back to his days as a young amateur. Many are railroad related: "Steam Engine Charlie", "Speeding Locomotive Charlie", "Choo-Choo Charlie", "Amtrak". Other nicknames include "Black Magic" (which he had stenciled on the back of his racing pants in 1985), "Big Chuck ", "The Fleein' Korean", and "Chasemainian Devil".

== Racing career ==
Note: Professional first are on the national level unless otherwise indicated.

Milestone	Event details
Started Racing:	1979/80 age 12 or 13. Townsend himself is rather vague on this point
Sanctioning Body:	
First race bike:	
First race result:	Third place in Beginner class in Hellyer Park in San Jose, California.
First win (local):	
First sponsor:	Woodside Bicycle Shop.
First national win:	In 17 & Over Open at the 1985 American Bicycle Association (ABA) Supernational in Pico Rivera, California, on January 27, 1985.
Turned Professional:	December 28, 1986, at the National Bicycle League (NBL) Christmas National at age 19.
First Professional race result:	First in "B" Pro on December 28, 1986, in Columbus, Ohio, at the National Bicycle League (NBL)'s Christmas National. He won US$600, the equivalent of US$1,126.09 in 2007 (Cost of Living Calculator) He also took a sixth in Pro Award but he finished out of the money.
First Professional win:	See above.
First Junior Men/Pro* race result:	See above.
First Junior Men/Pro win:	See above.
First Senior Pro** race result:	First in "AA" Pro at the American Bicycle Association (ABA) Gilley's Nationals in Pasadena, Texas, on March 7, 1987. He won US$535, the equivalent to US$1,004.10 2007. After the ABA Scottsdale National, Charles Townsend called the ABA and moved himself up to "AA" pro. This was reminiscent of Brian Patterson asking permission from then ABA Vice President Gene Roden to move up to "AA" after one race in "A" pro in early 1982.
First Senior Pro win:	See above.
Height and weight at height of his career:	Ht:6'2" Wt:~195 lbs.
Retired:	2002. He raced in the Veteran Pro class of the ABA and the NBL's Master class until 2004.

*In the NBL it is B" Pro/Superclass/"A" Pro depending on the era; in the ABA it is "A" Pro.
**In the NBL it is "A" Pro (Elite Men); in the ABA it is "AA" Pro.

=== Career factory and major bicycle shop sponsors ===
Note: This listing only denotes the racer's primary sponsors. At any given time a racer could have numerous ever changing co-sponsors. Primary sponsorships can be verified by BMX press coverage and sponsor's advertisements at the time in question.

==== Amateur/Junior Men ====
- U.S. Boss Racing Products: January 1985 – March 31, 1985
- Free Agent: March 31, 1985 – December 27, 1985
- Hutch Hi-Performance BMX: December 28, 1985 – December 31, 1986. He would turn pro with this sponsor.

==== Professional/Elite Men ====
- Hutch Hi-Performance BMX: December 28, 1985 – December 31, 1986.
- Cyclecraft: January 1, 1987 – March 21, 1987.
- CW (Custom Works) Racing: March 21, 1987 – November 27, 1987. "CW" never stood for "Coast Wheels" as it is widely thought. Coast Wheels was a bike shop that Roger Worsham owned. Custom Works was a completely different and independent company. This is in contrast with JMC (Jim Melton Cyclery) which did start out as a bicycle shop and then began manufacturing its own BMX components including entire bicycles.
- Revcore: November 28, 1987 – November 26, 1988. Revcore was owned and operated by Roger Worsham who also owned CW Racing, It was a separate product line much like Shadow Racing was in 1983. Townsend's last race for them was the Friday night November 27 Honda Super Cup, one day prior to the start of the 1987 ABA Grand National, where Townsend switch over to Revcore and captured ABA No.1 pro for that year. By 1989 Roger Worsham would divest himself of both Custom Works and Revcore.
- Diamond Back (Centurion): November 27, 1988 – December 31, 1989. At the end of the 1989 season Diamond Back decided to let the entire team go except for Matt Hadan, a pro. Harry Leary decided to retire. Charles Townsend was sponsorless for three months until April 1990.
- Powerlite Industries*: Mid April 1990 – November 1991.
- Robinson Racing Products: November 1991 – December 1998. After seven years Robinson dropped Townsend after the 1998 racing season.
- Troy Lee Designs/Jones Soda: April 1999 – March 2000. Charles didn't have a primary sponsor for approximately 15 months between Robinson Racing and Airborne Direct. Troy Lee Designs and Jones Soda were many co-sponsors that helped support him on the national race circuit while he searched for a main, primary sponsor.
- Airborne Direct: March 28, 2000 – December 2000
- Kona/Rocket Cash.Com: December 20, 2000–
- Phantom Bikes: January 2003 – December 2003
- Advent: January 2004–

*By this time Gary Turner (GT) Racing had brought Powerlite.

=== Career bicycle motocross titles ===
Note: Listed are District, State/Provincial/Department, Regional, National, and International titles in italics. "Defunct" refers to the fact of that sanctioning body in question no longer existing at the start of the racer's career or at that stage of his/her career. Depending on point totals of individual racers, winners of Grand Nationals do not necessarily win National titles. Series and one off Championships are also listed in block.

==== Amateur/Junior Men ====
National Bicycle Association (NBA)

National Bicycle League (NBL)

- 1985 18 & Over Expert Grandnational Champion
- 1986 18 & Over Expert National No.1

American Bicycle Association (ABA)

- None

International Bicycle Motocross Federation (IBMXF)

- 1986 17 & Over Expert and 18–24 Cruiser World Champion

Fédération Internationale Amateur de Cyclisme (FIAC)

- None

Union Cycliste Internationale (UCI)

==== Professional/Elite Men ====
National Bicycle Association (NBA)

- None

National Bicycle League (NBL)

American Bicycle Association (ABA)

- 1987 Honda Supercup Champion. He also won a Honda XR-250R motorcycle as a prize.
- 1987 National No.1 Pro. He won a Honda pickup truck as a prize.
- 1990 Pro U.S. Open East Champion
- 1990 National No.3 Pro

United States Bicycle Motocross Association (USBA)

- None

International Bicycle Motocross Federation (IBMXF)*

- 1989 Pro World Champion

Fédération Internationale Amateur de Cyclisme (FIAC)*

- None

Union Cycliste Internationale (UCI)*

*Note: Beginning in 1991 the IBMXF and FIAC, the amateur cycling arm of the UCI, had been holding joint World Championship events as a transitional phase in merging which began in earnest in 1993. Beginning with the 1996 season the IBMXF and FIAC completed the merger and both ceased to exist as independent entities being integrated into the UCI. Beginning with the 1996 World Championships held in Brighton, England, the UCI would officially hold and sanction BMX World Championships and with it inherited all precedents, records, streaks, etc. from both the IBMXF and FIAC.

Pro Series Championships

=== Notable accolades ===
- Named one of the new BMX Action's "Terrible Ten" top amateurs and future professionals for 1986.
- Named BMX Action's Pro Rookie of the Year for 1987.
- Named BMX Plus! 1988 "Racer of the Year" with 20.74% (1,930) of the vote out of 9,305 cast. He won a Suzuki RM125 motocross motorcycle.

=== Significant injuries ===
- Cracked Tibia and dislocated knee at ABA Lone Star National in Fort Worth, Texas, on July 2, 1988, on the back straightaway in the third and last pro main. Laid up for about five weeks until the International Bicycle Motocross Federation (IBMXF) World Championships in Santiago, Chile on August 14. This was his very first BMX related injury. What precipitated the accident was his front wheel coming off in mid race at a jump. He did along with Pete Loncarevich who was nursing broken ribs, roll off the gate at the NBL Waterford Oaks, Michigan, race in a pro forma act to achieve the prerequisite number of NBL races participated in a season to be eligible to race in the NBL Grand Nationals and become national number one pro pending the results of the Grand Nationals.
- Broke ankle at NBL Grand National in September 1988.
- Separated shoulder at the 1992 ABA National in Topeka, Kansas, on May 10. The rumored prognosis was an eight- to ten-week lay off but he was racing two weeks later at the ABA Summer Nationals in Sunol, California, on May 23. Racing in pain, he did not make the mains on Saturday but did get a third on Sunday in "AA" pro.
- Broke thumb in early 1996.
- Broke hand in mid January 2004 during practice.

=== Miscellaneous and Trivia ===
- Named number five on the list of the "Dirtiest Riders in BMX" in the June 1992 issue of BMX Plus!

== BMX magazine covers ==
Bicycle Motocross News:

- None

Minicycle/BMX Action & Super BMX:

- September 1988 Vol.15 No.9 with Gary Ellis and Greg Hill (SBMXF) In insert freestyler Matt Hoffman.

Bicycle Motocross Action & Go:

- August 1987 Vol.12 No.8 with Billy Griggs and Eddy King. (BMXA)
- October 1991 Vol.2 Iss.12 In insert freestyler Jay Miron (Go).

BMX Plus!:

- August 1987 Vol.10 No.8 in bottom insert (CW) behind Gary Ellis (6) and Greg Hill (3) and tied with unidentified (23). Top insert freestyler John Ludvigson; Main image: freestyler Matt Hoffman.
- March 1988 Vol.11 No.3 in bottom insert (15) ahead of Travis Chipres (8) and unidentified. In top insert freestyler Woody Itson, BMX Plus! tester Todd Britton, Harry Leary and Kevin Hull. In circular insert Steve Broderson; main image freestyler Josh White.
- April 1988 Vol.11 No.4 In bottom half of cover (1). In top half freestyler Ron Wilkerson.
- May 1989 Vol.12 No.5
- May 1992 Vol.15 No.5
- December 1992 Vol.15 No.12 (3) in top insert in a dead tie with Gary Ellis (2) in center and Pete Loncarevich (1) in foreground. In right center insert Tim Judge circa 1984; in bottom left insert unidentified BMXer and MXer. Main image freestylers Brian Blyther & Ron Wilkerson in 1986.
- July 1993 Vol.16 No.7 in top insert behind John Purse (20). In bottom left insert Todd Corbitt. In lower right insert freestyle frames and forks.
- February 1997 Vol.20 No.2 (10) in center insert in fourth place behind Randy Stumpfhauser (100) leading; Brian Foster (3) in second; Unidentified (16) in third. In bottom right insert Kiyomi Waller (403); in top insert dirt jumper Matt Beringer. in bottom left insert various helmets.

Bicycles and Dirt:

- None

Snap BMX Magazine & Transworld BMX:

- None

Moto Mag:

- None

NBA World & NBmx World (The official NBA/NBmxA membership publication):

Bicycles Today & BMX Today (The official NBL membership publication under one name change.

ABA Action, American BMXer, BMXer (The official ABA membership publication under two name changes):

- American BMXer March 1987 Vol.9 No.2 (15) behind Gary Ellis (3) in first, ahead of obscured unidentified in third and Todd Slavik (4) in fourth place.
- American BMXer September 1988 Vol.10 No.8
- American BMXer September 1990 Vol.12 No.8 ahead of Travis Chipres.

USBA Racer (The official USBA membership publication):

== BMX and general press magazine interviews and articles ==
- "Sharpshootin'--Charles Townsend" BMX Action June 1985 Vol.10 No.6 pg.54 sidebar
- "Charlie & Billy" BMX Action August 1987 Vol.12 No.8 pg.58 Joint interview with Billy Griggs.
- "Charles Townsend" BMX Plus! September 1987 Vol.10 No.9 pg.29
- "A Few Minutes With Charles Townsend" Super BMX & Freestyle October 1987 Vol. No.10 pg.48
- "The Champs: Charles Townsend" BMX Plus! April 1988 Vol.11 No.4 pg.38 One of six mini articles of the six ABA National No.1 winners of 1987.
- "Charles Townsend: National #1 Pro" American BMXer September 1988 Vol.10 No.8 pg.16
- "A Lengthy Conversation with Charles Townsend: Nothing's Impossible" BMX Action April 1989 Vol.14 No.4 pg.16
- "Inventory: Charles Townsend's Powerlite" Go September 1990 Vol.1 Issue 11 pg.37 Charles Townsend describes his new sponsor's racing bicycle.
- "Directions: Psyche" Go September 1990 Vol.1 Issue 11 pg.68 Short Blurb on how to deal with the mental pressures of a big race.
- "Uncovered" Go October 1991 Vol.2 Issue 12 pg.13
- "The Soul Train" BMX Plus! May 1992 Vol.15 No.5 pg.50
