= John George (BMX rider) =

American bicycle motocross rider (born 1958)

Personal information
- Full name: John George
- Born: May 20, 1958 (age 68) Canoga Park, California, United States

Cycling career
- Sport: Cycling
- Current team: Retired
- Discipline: Bicycle Motocross (BMX)
- Role: Racer
- Rider type: Off Road

Amateur teams
- 1974–1975: Canoga Cycle Center
- 1975: Canoga Schwinn
- 1975–1977: Shimano

Professional teams
- 1977–1978: Shimano
- 1978–1983: Mongoose

John George (born May 20, 1958, in Canoga Park, California United States) was a professional American "Old School" Bicycle Motocross (BMX) racer whose prime competitive years were from (1972–1978).

== Racing career milestones ==
Note: In the early days of professional racing, 1976 and prior, many tracks offered small purse prize money to the older racers of an event, even before the official sanctioning bodies offered prize money in formal divisions themselves. Hence early professionals like Stu Thomsen turning "pro" in 1975 at 16 years old racing for small amounts of money at track events when offered even before the NBA, regarded as the first true national BMX sanctioning body, had a professional division. The NBA started the first pro division Class in 1977 called Open Pro a pro/am class in which racers 14 and over could race in. For the sake of consistency and standardization noted professional first are for the first pro races for prize money offered by official BMX sanctioning bodies and not independent track events. Professional first are also on the national level unless otherwise indicated.

Started racing: September 1972

Sanctioning body: None. This was the era before official sanctioning bodies and individual tracks had their own race series and championships.

First race result: Unknown, but over the first two years of his career he won 40 trophies of which 36 were for first place

First win (local): See above.

Home sanctioning body district(s): National Bicycle Association (NBA) District "X" (Orange/Los Angeles County);

First sponsor:

First national win: He won the very first official National in BMX history in both his class and overall, the National Bicycle Association (NBA) Winternationals held in Phoenix, Arizona, on March 29, 1975. He won both 14 & Over Expert and the Trophy Dash, which made him the overall event Champion.

Turned professional: 1977

First professional race result:

First professional win:

Retired: The May 1976 issue of Bicycle Motocross News implies he retired around March 1976. However, George would frequently come out of "retirement" after not racing for a few months and compete in large races. He retired from active competition for good after the 1978 NBA Grandnational getting a first in Open Pro winning USD$180 and a second in Trophy Dash but even then in 1980 and a few years after that he raced once a year being employed by Mongoose as a Plant Manager and representing Mongoose at races they sponsored once a year.

Height & weight at height of his career (): Ht:" Wt:lbs.

=== Career factory and major bike shop sponsors ===
Note: This listing only denotes the racer's primary sponsors. At any given time a racer could have numerous ever-changing co-sponsors. Primary sponsorships can be verified by BMX press coverage and sponsor's advertisements at the time in question. When possible exact dates are used.

==== Amateur ====
- Canoga Cycle Center: 1972 – Early 1975
- Canoga Schwinn: Early 1975 – Mid 1975
- Shimano Sales Corporation: Mid 1975 – Early February 1978. He would turn pro with this company. Apparently John George briefly "retired" in early 1976 but came out of it to race the NBA Western States Championship; winning with Bobby Encinas in Sidehack and taking second in 16 & Over Expert. BMX News test rider and racer 12-year-old R. L. Osborn who wrote the article (and is the son of contributor BMX News Bob Osborn and future owner/publisher/editor of BMX Action) in BMX News about the event was skeptical about Georges retirement:

"Yes, John George came out of (Huh!) retirement to race the Western States Championship with Bobby."

==== Professional ====
- Shimano Sales Corporation: Mid 1975-Early February 1978.
- Mongoose (BMX Products): Early February 1978 – 1983. His first race with Mongoose was the NBA Winternationals in Las Vegas, Nevada, on February 19, 1978. He won both 16 Expert and Open Pro/Am taking the overall event title. This was the sponsor he would stay with for the rest of his career. He would eventually go to work with them after he retired from serious competition in 1979, eventually becoming a plant manager while racing a national once a year for a couple of years.

=== Career bicycle motocross titles ===
Note: Listed are District, State/Provincial/Department, Regional, National, and International titles in italics. "Defunct" refers to the fact of that sanctioning body in question no longer existing at the start of the racer's career or at that stage of his/her career. Depending on point totals of individual racers, winners of Grand Nationals do not necessarily win National titles. Series and one off Championships are also listed in block.

==== Amateur ====
Non Sanction titles*:

- 1973 Solidad Sands Overall California State Champion

*In the days before the creation of official sanctioning bodies for BMX individual tracks had their own Championship titles.

National Bicycle Association (NBA)

- 1974, 1975 Overall Western States Champion.
- 1975 14 & Over Expert and Overall Winternational Champion.
- 1975 14 & Over Expert and Overall First California Skateboard and BMX Championships* Champion.
- 1975 District X (Los Angeles) Champion
- 1975 Open Class and Sidehack Class (with Bobby Encinas) Grandnational Champion. This was the first ever BMX Grandnational.
- 1975 National No.1
- 1976 Western States Sidehack Champion with partner Bobby Encinas.
- 1978 Open Pro Grand National Champion (Pro/Am title)

*This was a combined event of the two sports Held at the Orange County Fairgrounds in Costa Mesa, California, between August 2 and 5 1975. The BMX event was held on the 2nd and 3rd. Participants in either discipline were not and did not compete in both events.

National Bicycle League (NBL)

- None

National Pedal Sport Association (NPSA)

American Bicycle Association (ABA)

- None

Fédération Internationale Amateur de Cyclisme (FIAC)*

- None

International Bicycle Motocross Federation (IBMXF)*

- None

Union Cycliste Internationale (UCI)*

- None

*See note in professional section

==== Professional ====
National Bicycle Association (NBA)

- 1977 16 Expert, Open Pro, Trophy Dash and Overall RC Cola/Two Wheelers Races of Champions Champion. (Triple)

The RC Cola/Two Wheelers Race of Champions was a seven-race NBA series sponsored by RC Cola and Two Wheelers. Racers raced six regional qualifying races in California and Arizona. Only racers who made at least the semi-finals or mains (if the class was too small for a semi final) were invited to race the Championship event held on May 15, 1977, in Gardena, California, at Ascot Park.

- 1977 15 & Over Open South Pacific BMX Championships Champion
- 1978 Open Pro Grandnational Champion (Pro/Am title)

National Bicycle League (NBL)

- None

National Pedal Sport Association (NPSA)

- None

American Bicycle Association (ABA)

- None

United States Bicycle Motocross Association (USBA)

- None

International Bicycle Motocross Federation (IBMXF)*

- None

Fédération Internationale Amateur de Cyclisme (FIAC)*

- None (FIAC did not have a strictly professional division during its existence) (defunct).

Union Cycliste Internationale (UCI)*

- None

*Note: Beginning in 1991 the IBMXF and FIAC had been holding joint World Championship events as a transitional phase in merging which began in earnest in 1993. Beginning with the 1996 season the IBMXF and FIAC completed the merger and both ceased to exist as independent entities being integrated into the UCI. Beginning with the 1997 World Championships held in Brighton, England the UCI would officially hold and sanction BMX World Championships and with it inherited all precedents, records, streaks, etc. from both the IBMXF and FIAC.

Pro Series Championships

=== Notable accolades ===
- He won the very first official National in BMX history, the National Bicycle Association (NBA) Winternationals held in Phoenix, Arizona, on March 29, 1975. This was the very first event in which National points, as opposed to just district/regional points, were rewarded. He won both 14 & Over Expert and Trophy Dash which made him the overall event Champion
- He was one of the founding members of the Professional Racing Organization (PRO) racers guild in 1977.
- He is a 1985 inductee to the ABA BMX Hall of Fame.

=== Racing traits and habits ===
- In the last few years of his career he would race infrequently, taking months off come back and win a few important races and then disappear for months again. As Bob Osborn, owner, publisher and editor of Bicycle Motocross Action put it in the July/August 1978 issue:

"...he has been an 'inner and outer' He'll disappear for awhile, then pop back in and wind a major race. How he maintain his peak racing condition is a mystery to everybody."

=== Miscellaneous ===
- John George shares the exact birthdate of May 20, 1958, with another racer, Stu Thomsen.
- In 1975 he was one of the first racers to convert from coaster brakes to freewheels and caliper brakes. By comparison Stu Thomsen would not convert until 1978. He also was one of the first to use light weight components in an era of 30- to 40-pound race bikes.

== Post BMX career ==
- Soon after retiring from active competition he took a job with his last sponsor, Mongoose, in 1977. At first it was a 10-hour job mounting tires on bicycle wheels. Later it was placing parts in boxes. Within the year he was the warehouse manager. A few years later he was plant manager. For a number of years he would race once a year at the Mongoose-sponsored NBA Grandnationals.

== BMX press magazine interviews and articles ==
- "John George-Quite Terror" Bicycle Motocross News December 1974 Vol.1 No.7 p. 17
- "Expert John George Talks About Being Race-Ready" Bicycle Motocross News April 1976 Vol. 3 No. 4 p. 9
- "Old BMX'ers Never Die...." Bicycle Motocross Action March 1982 Vol.7 No. 3 p. 40
- "John George!" BMX Plus! March 1982 Vol. 5 No.3 p. 27

== BMX magazine covers ==
Note: Only magazines that were in publication at the time of the racer's career(s) are listed unless specifically noted.

Bicycle Motocross News:

- January 1975 Vol.2 No. 1 with Bobby Encinas, David Clinton and Jack Shannon.
- May 1975 Vol.2 No.4
- September 1977 Vol. 3 No. 8 behind an unidentified racer. In insert Rory Ingano.
- March 1978 Vol. 4 No. 3 (166) ahead of Bobby Encinas (3). This was the last issue of Bicycle Motocross News ever published.

Minicycle/BMX Action & Super BMX:

Bicycle Motocross Action & Go:

- None

BMX Plus!:

- None

Total BMX

- None

Bicycles and Dirt:

- None

NBA World & NBmxA World (the official NBA/NBmxA membership publication under two names):

Bicycles Today & BMX Today (The official NBL membership publication) under two names

ABA Action, American BMXer, BMXer (the official ABA membership publication under three different names):
