= National Pedal Sport Association =

Logo of the now defunct National Pedal Sport Association and slogan.

The National Pedal Sport Association (NPSA) was a South Eastern USA regional Bicycle Motocross (BMX) sanctioning body originally based in Palm Harbor, Florida. It then soon after moved to Dunedin, Florida, for most of its existence. Then in its last years Pinellas Park, Florida, was its headquarters. For the first six years of its existence it focused mostly on amateur racing since they were stressing the family experience nature of the sport and putting on the fairest and most inclusive races possible, fitting their motto "Ride For Fun". The NPSA ceased operations as an independent sanctioning body after it was bought by the American Bicycle Association (ABA) in 1988. The first joint NPSA-ABA sanctioned race was held on March 19, 1988, at the NPSA track in Ocoee, Florida.

== History ==
The last president of NPSA was Gail Goudey. I served as president from 1985 until the sale of it to ABA in 1988.The last home base of NPSA was in West Palm Beach, FL.ˈˈ

== Vital statistics ==
Statistic	Details
Founded:	October 1974
Motto(s)/Slogan(s):	"Ride for Fun"
Years of operation:	1974–1988
Original Headquarters:	Palm Harbor, Florida
Last Headquarters:	Pinellas Park, Florida
Original Owner:	Robert M. Krokker
Last Owner:	American Bicycle Association (ABA) The NPSA was purchased by the ABA in March 1988 acquiring the NPSA's nine tracks in Florida. Through this purchase, This was the first time the ABA ever had tracks in the state of Florida.
Original President:	Robert M. Krokker
Last President:	Rich Caporaso
Original Vice President:	
Last Vice President:	
Employees (peak):	3,000
First track:	Dunedin Optimus BMX track in Dunedin, Florida
Peak claimed number of tracks:	26
Initial number of tracks:	Seven in October 1974.
Peak claimed number of members:	3,500 in 1983
First sanctioned race:	April 25, 1975, at the Largo Recreational Center in Largo, Florida. It was the first sanctioned race in Florida. The very first organized BMX raced happened on May 18, 1974, at Ross Norton Park in Clearwater, Florida.
First National:	August 30, 1975, in Clearwater, Florida
Number of nationals per year:	Approximately eight (including Grand National)
Span:	Regional. Four states: Florida, Georgia, South Carolina, North Carolina
First Grand National:	
Last Grand National:	On August 19 through 21, 1988, in St. Petersburg, Florida
In house newspaper:	
In house magazine:	

== Proficiency and division class labels and advancement method ==
Division	Details
Amateur proficiency and age levels 20 inch class:	Novice, Junior, Expert: 4 & Under (Boys & girls), then 5 novice to 16 Expert in one year steps. Number plate color also denoted the skill level of the racer: Black for Novice; Yellow for Junior; White for Expert; Open: 7 & under to 14 & over in 2 year steps. Age classifications only
Amateur Cruiser:	15 & Under, 16–20, 21–29, 30–39, 40 & Over. Age classifications only
Girls 20 inch:	5-6 girls to 15 & up girl in 2 year steps Age classifications only, no proficiency levels. Amateur only.
Girls cruiser:	15 & under, 16–20, 21–29, 30–39, 40 & Over. Age classifications only. Amateur only.
Professional Classes:	Pro Cruiser, Senior (Pro) Open, Pro 20". Men only.
Qualifying system:	Moto system a.k.a. Olympic System a.k.a. Cumulative Scoring System.

== Operations ==
Like the National Bicycle League (NBL) it did not award a year end overall national #1 male or female amateur. Amateur national number ones were awarded within age divisions. The NPSA did have year end overall National No.1 Pro 20" and Cruiser classes. The NPSA did have features particular to it. The NPSA season was really divided up into three: District, State and the three-month-long National season. The District level racing focused the racers on racing on the local level for local laurels without having to travel within the state and between states. The State season was reserved for touring the various NPSA tracks within a state for the State Championship title. The national season was reserved for touring the circuit between the four states the NPSA had tracks in for the National number one titles culminating in a Grand National.

This was not its only unique method of holding races. Another was the "scramble system". The NPSA like the NBL and the now defunct National Bicycle Association (NBA) they used the moto system a.k.a. the Olympic system to determine which riders graduate from the qualifying heats called Motos. In these motos points are awarded to the racers proportional to the position in which they finish. Each moto is run three times, that is the group of racers must race three times with the points awarded during each race to each individual racer being added. For instance say a 10 Expert racer had a class of 8 racers and he came in first in all three runs of his class. He would have a total of three points, 1+1+1 making him a certainty to qualify for the main (or if a large race the semi-finals) save for a disqualification for a rule infraction. on the other hand if a racer came in last three times in that class of eight racers then he would have a total of 24 points 8+8+8 making it almost impossible for him to make the main save for someone(s) else being disqualified. The racers with the four lowest points would qualify for the main. However, unlike the conventional Olympic system, in the NPSA added a unique "Scramble system" that would shuffle the racers randomly or scrambled. The racers after each moto, if there were more than eight racers in a class (eight being the maximum number of racers the starting gate can hold at any one time) would be split into two heats, say in a class of 11 15 novices the first group would be six racers the second group would be the remaining 5 racers. Again, nothing unusual. What was unique to the NPSA was after each round, instead of the racers racing the same people they raced against the first time around as was standard practice in BMX, they would very likely race some racers that were in their class but not in the original first moto but the second. The race would be run in the second go round the points added to the previous total as before. Then the riders would be scrambled again and the race would be run for the last qualifying heat. The NPSA's position was that this was fairer since all of the racers had a chance to compete against the eventual winner with the winner not racing either the same easy competition he can beat with little effort with the racers that he have trouble with in other motos. Conversely he also will not constantly going against people he finds hard to beat while others having easy opponents. Of course either scenario could happen with the luck of the draw.

Another unique aspect to NPSA racing was that you moved down a proficiency class when one's birthday occurred. For instance say that on June 30 you were an 11 expert. You have a birthday on July 1, making you 12. Instead of going to the 12 expert class, you were demoted down in terms of skill class back to 12 junior and was required to make expert again.

Until mid 1984, the NPSA had very strict, and to a few outside observers, too strict rules against contact between racers during races. The slightest bumping during a race could result in disqualification. You couldn't block pass, you had to stay in your lane at the beginning of the start (the International Bicycle Motocross Federation (IBMXF) had a similar rule). At one time the NPSA complained to the Orlando, Florida, Parks Department about the National Bicycle League (NBL) making the jumps, in its view, too large at a track they shared with the NBL. Some outsiders went as far as to call it "racing for wimps" in regards to the NPSA. However, these restrictions were greatly relaxed by the time of the July 1984 Supercross nationals. Ironically, this was also the time when Ronnie Anderson, a new top professional in the major sanctioning bodies of the NBL and American Bicycle Association (ABA) was just being noted for his rough, all or nothing desire to win, resulting in numerous wrecks, to the members of the pro class displeasure.

While stressing family and amateur racing, the NPSA did have a pro class with events called "Supercross" held during the year to qualify the pros for the Grand National like the on held in 1982 at Daytona Beach, Florida.

== NPSA National number ones by year ==
Note: Dates reflect the year the racers *won* their plates, not the year they actually *raced* their No.1 plates. In other words, Roy Reboucas won his No.1 plate in 1982 entitling him to race with #1 on his plate for the 1983 season. Roland Veicht then won the No.1 plate in 1983 and raced with #1 on his plate during the 1984 racing season.

CDNE=Class Did Not Exist.

Pro Nat.#1 Men

- 1975 CDNE
- 1976 CDNE
- 1977 CDNE
- 1978 CDNE
- 1979
- 1980
- 1981 Roy Reboucas
- 1982 Roy Reboucas
- 1983 Roland Veicht
- 1984 Bill Madden
- 1985
- 1986
- 1987
- 1988

Pro Cruiser Nat.#1 Men

- 1975 CDNE
- 1976 CDNE
- 1977 CDNE
- 1978 CDNE
- 1979 CDNE
- 1980
- 1981
- 1982 Roland Veicht
- 1983
- 1984
- 1985
- 1986
- 1987
- 1988

Amat.Nat.#1 Men

- 1975 David Clinton
- 1976 Randy Street
- 1977
- 1978 Seth Buccieri
- 1979 Shelby James
- 1980 Shelby James
- 1981
- 1982
- 1983
- 1984
- 1985
- 1986
- 1987
- 1988 Matthew Cutbill

Amat.Cruiser Nat.#1 Men

- 1975 CDNE
- 1976 CDNE
- 1977 CDNE
- 1978 CDNE
- 1979 CDNE
- 1980
- 1981
- 1982
- 1983
- 1984
- 1985
- 1986
- 1987
- 1988 Allen Stanton

Amat.Nat.#1 Women

- 1975
- 1976 Kim Krokker
- 1977 Teresa Bradley
- 1978
- 1979
- 1980
- 1981
- 1982
- 1983
- 1984
- 1985
- 1986
- 1987
- 1988 Michelle Testa

== See also ==
- American Bicycle Association
- National Bicycle Association
- National Bicycle League
- United Bicycle Racers Association
- United States Bicycle Motocross Association
