= Donny Atherton =

American bicycle motocross rider

Personal information
- Full name: Donald Atherton
- Born: January 30, 1964 (age 62) Newbury Park, California, United States of America

Cycling career
- Sport: Cycling
- Current team: Retired
- Discipline: Bicycle Motocross (BMX)
- Role: Racer
- Rider type: Off Road

Amateur teams
- 1978-1979: Flying Dutchman
- 1979: Jag BMX
- 1979-1980: Schwinn

Professional teams
- 1980-1983: Schwinn
- 1984: Pro-Fit
- 1984: Champion
- 1984: Redline Engineering
- 1984: Works/Pro-fit
- 1984-1985: Vector

Donald Atherton (born January 30, 1964) is a former American "Old School" professional Bicycle Motocross (BMX) racer whose prime competitive years were from 1978–1982.

== Life and racing career ==
Note: Professional first are on the national level unless otherwise indicated.

Donald Atherton was born on January 30, 1964 and is from Newbury Park, California, United States. He started racing on December 1977 at age 13. His first sponsor was the Flying Dutchman Team, a bike shop.

His first race bicycle was a red FMF, and his first race result was first place in 13 beginner at the Elks Club BMX track in Simi Valley, California. It was also his first win. His sanctioning body was the NBA (NBmxA), and the sanctioning body district(s) were the American Bicycle Association (ABA) California 7 (CA-7 1980)

After he broke his pelvic bone participating in a school track meet in the spring of 1978, he was out of racing for six weeks. Atherton's first national trophy came at the NBA Winter Nationals in Las Vegas, Nevada in February 1979 in second place in both 15 Expert and 14 & over open. He turned professional in late December 1980 at age 16. His first professional race result was fourth place in a local race in Van Nuys, California during the week of December 20, 1980. His first National pro race was the JAG World Championships on December 27, 1980. He crashed in the Pro Money class first qualifying moto and his two other qualifying finishes in the qualifying round wasn't good enough and did not transfer to the semi-finals. He did get a sixth in Pro Trophy.

His first professional* win was in "AA" at the American Bicycle Association (ABA) Great Northwest National in Sumner, Washington on June 15, 1983. He won US$500 (US$1,032.63 in 2007 Cost of Living Calculator).

He suffered a separated shoulder in a crash during one of his qualifying motos at the NBL Memphis Classic in Memphis, Tennessee in March 1985.

*At the start of his pro career, there wasn't a two tier system of Junior and Senior Pros, therefore his first pro race and/or win was his first in Senior pro.

== Racing sponsors ==
Note: This listing only denotes the racer's primary sponsors. At any given time a racer could have numerous ever changing co-sponsors. Primary sponsorships can be verified by BMX press coverage and sponsor's advertisements at the time in question. When possible exact dates are given.

=== Amateur ===
- Flying Dutchman's Performance Products: January 1978-December 1978.
- Jag BMX: Early 1979. He was on Jag for only two weeks.
- Schwinn Bicycle Company: March 1979-December 1983. He joined Schwinn at the 1979 NBA Mid-West Championships in St. Louis, Missouri. Atherton would turn professional with this company.

=== Professional ===
- Schwinn Bicycle Company: March 1979-December 1983.
- Pro-Fit: January 1, 1984-Late January 1984. This was a bicycle stem company Atherton was part owner of and at this time his primary sponsor.
- Kam Marketing/Champion Racing Products: Late January 1984-April 1984
- Redline Engineering: Early May 1984-Mid June 1984. Atherton was only sponsored by Redline for approximately six weeks, leaving a week after the ABA US Nationals held on June 3, 1984. He was dissatisfied with the number of races planned on sending him, ten maximum, in contrast to the thirty or more Vector could send him to.
- Works/Pro-fit: Mid June 1984-November 1984. Once again his company was his main sponsor.
- Vector: November 1984-June 1985

== Racing titles and accolades ==
Note: Listed are District, State/Provincial/Department, Regional, National, and International titles in italics. "Defunct" refers to the fact of that sanctioning body in question no longer existing at the start of the racer's career or at that stage of his/her career. Depending on point totals of individual racers, winners of Grand Nationals do not necessarily win National titles. Series and one off Championships are also listed in block.

=== Accolades ===
- He was named the Rookie of the Year for 1979 by BMX Plus! magazine
- He won the 1980 NBA best Fifteen Year Old Expert Award
- He was named the 1980 NBA Most Improved Rider of the Year

=== Amateur ===
National Bicycle Association (NBA)

- 1979 National No.3
- 1979 15 Expert Jag World Champion (NBA/NBL sanctioned)
- 1980 16 Expert and Overall Western States Champion.
- 1980 National No.1

National Bicycle League (NBL)

- 1980 16 Expert National No. 3

=== Professional ===
National Bicycle Association (NBA)

- 1981 Pro National No. 17

National Bicycle League (NBL)

- 1984 Pro National No. 14

American Bicycle Association (ABA)

- 1982 Pro 20" Northeastern Gold Cup Champion
- 1982 Pro National No. 3

== BMX press coverage ==
He was covered in the following BMX press magazine interviews and articles:

- "Donny Atherton 'King of the Experts'" BMX Plus! August 1980 Vol.3 No.8 pg.36
- "Rags To Riches: Schwinn's Donny Atherton" Super BMX August 1980 Vol.7 No.8 pg.66
- "New Wave Superstars" Bicycle Motocross Action August 1980 Vol.5 No.8 pg.37. Mini biography with six other BMX newcomers.
- "The Complete Racer: Atherton & Schwinn" Bicycle Motocross Action December 1980 Vol.5 No.12 pg.72. A detailed look at Atherton's race bike.
- "A Lesson in BMX" Super BMX June 1983 Vol.10 No.6 pg.64. Atherton gives BMX racing tips to celebrity child actor Jason Bateman.
- "Devonshire" BMX Action July 1984 Vol.9 No.7 pg.27. One of eight mini-interviews held during the 1984 Devonshire Downs NBL race.
- "Atherton Attack" Super BMX & Freestyle May 1985 Vol.12 No.5 pg.10

He has been on the cover of Total BMX, Bicycle Motocross Action, and Go. Other covers include BMX Plus! (July 1979 Vol.2 No.7 behind Eddy King), Minicycle/BMX Action & Super BMX (March 1985 Vol.12 No.5 in SBMX&F), and Bicycles and Dirt (a magazine published by the ABA), and USBA Racer (the official USBA membership publication). Also:

- NBA World & NBmxA World (the official NBA/NBmxA membership publication)
- Bicycles Today & BMX Today (the official NBL membership publication under two names)
- 'ABA Action, American BMXer, BMXer (the official ABA membership publication under three names)
