= Gary Ellis =

American bicycle motocross racer (born 1966)

Personal information
- Full name: Gary Leo Ellis Jr.
- Nickname: "The Lumberjack"
- Born: March 21, 1966 (age 60) United States
- Height: 1.91 m (6 ft 3 in) (1990)
- Weight: ~93 kg (205 lb) (1990)

Cycling career
- Sport: Cycling
- Current team: Retired (1998)
- Discipline: Bicycle motocross (BMX)
- Role: Racer
- Rider type: Off-road

Amateur teams
- 1979: Pedal Pushers Bike Shop
- 1979–1981: Robinson Racing Products
- 1982–1983: Kuwahara Cycles, Ltd.

Professional teams
- 1983–1984: Kuwahara Cycles, Ltd.
- 1984: Flying W
- 1984–1986: Huffy Corporation
- 1986–1998: GT Racing & GT Bicycles/WD-40

Gary Leo Ellis Jr. (born March 21, 1966, in Tacoma, Washington, U.S.) was one of the last American "Old School" professional bicycle motocross (BMX) racer whose careers started in the 1970s to early 1980s. His prime competitive years were from 1982 to 1996.

Ellis was nicknamed "The Lumberjack" by the BMX "play by play" announcers at nationals. He was 6' 3", had a thick beard and mustache, and was born in a stereotypically American lumberjack region of the United States. An apocryphal story held that he sawed down a tree that was in the right of way of a practice track he was building in his front yard. The nickname stuck, and he had it throughout his 21-year career.

== Racing career milestones ==
Ellis started racing in 1977 at age 11 after he saw a BMX display at a car show and he asked his father if he could race. His father, Gary Leo Ellis Sr., is a 1987 ABA Hall of Fame inductee for the track operator with the longest continuously operating track in the country. His first race bicycle was a Schwinn Sting-Ray. His first local race result was fourth place at the Tacoma Jaycees BMX track.

The sanctioning body was Northwest Bicycle Motocross Association (NWBMXA), a short lived regional governing body in Washington State.

Ellis' first national amateur win was at an American Bicycle Association (ABA) in 15 Expert in Portland, Oregon, in 1981.

His first sponsor was Pedal Pushers Bike Shop in 1979.

He turned professional in December 1983 at age 17.

His first pro race result was a first place in junior "A" pro at the joint 1983 American Bicycle Association (ABA)/Canadian American Bicycle Association (CABA) Canadian-American BMX Championships pre race in Monroe, Washington, on December 10, 1983.

His first senior pro** race result was a seventh place in "A" Pro at the National Bicycle League (NBL) Celebrity Race For Childhelp USA/International in Azusa, California, on January 22, 1984. He moved himself up to "A" pro after the 1983 Jag World Super Bowl Championship which was held on December 29, 1983. This was a charity event.

His first Senior Pro win was in 1989. Ellis was the first ABA pro national No.1 in its history come from outside of California.

He retired in November 1998, after the 1998 ABA Grand National, at age 32.

=== Career factory and major bicycle shop sponsors ===
Note: This listing only denotes the racer's primary sponsors. At any given time a racer could have numerous co-sponsors. Primary sponsorships can be verified by BMX press coverage and sponsor's advertisements at the time in question. When possible, exact dates are given.

==== Amateur ====
- Pedal Pushers Bike Shop: 1979
- Robinson Racing Products: 1979 – December 1981. Began as a co-sponsorship through his bike shop, Pedal Pushers.
- Kuwahara Cycles, Ltd.: January 1982 – early September 1984. Turned pro while on Kuwhahara. "Kuwahara" means "Mulberry Meadows" in Japanese. The company is named after Sentaro Kuwahara, who founded the company in 1916 in Osaka, Japan.

==== Professional ====
- Kuwahara Cycles, Ltd.: January 1982 – early September 1984. Ellis quit due to a salary dispute with Kuwhahara a week after the NBL Grand National held on September 1 & 2.
- Flying W (bike shop): September 8, 1984 – September 22, 1984. Interim sponsor between Kuwhahara and Huffy.
- Huffy Corporation: September 23, 1984 – March 20, 1986. Ellis was sponsorless for over a month after Huffy dropped him.
- GT (Gary Turner) Racing & GT Bicycles/WD-40: April 27, 1986 – November 1998.

=== Career bicycle motocross titles ===
Note: Listed are district, state/provincial/department, regional, national, and international titles in italics. "Defunct" indicates that the sanctioning body no longer existed at the start of the racer's career or at that stage of his/her career. Depending on point totals of individual racers, winners of Grand Nationals do not necessarily win national titles. Series and one-off championships are also listed in block.

==== Amateur ====
National Bicycle Association (NBA)

- None

National Bicycle League (NBL)

- 1982 15 Expert Grandnational Champion

American Bicycle Association (ABA)

- 1982 16 Expert 2nd place Jag World Champion (ABA-sanctioned)
- 1983 17 & Over Expert Gold Cup Champion
- 1983 17 & Over Expert National No.1 Amateur*
- 1983 National No.2*

*Beginning with the 1983 season, the ABA instituted age class rankings, much like NBL practice. However, the overall National No. 1 Amateur title was retained. Doug Davis was overall National No. 1 Amateur for 1983.

United States Bicycle Motocross Association (USBA)

International Bicycle Motocross Federation (IBMXF)

- 1983 16 & Over Expert World Champion

Fédération Internationale Amateur de Cyclisme (FIAC)*

- None

Union Cycliste Internationale (UCI)*

*See note in Professional section.

==== Professional ====
National Bicycle Association (NBA)

- None

National Bicycle League (NBL)

- 1984 "A" pro Grandnational Champion
- 1987 "A" Pro Grandnational Champion
- 1988 "A" Pro Grandnational Champion
- 1988 National No.2 Pro
- 1989, 1994 National No.1 Pro
- 1998 Pro Class Grandnational Champion*

*In his last NBL race, the 1998 NBL Grand National on September 6, 1998, in Louisville, Kentucky, he scored a perfect three wins in the pro main motos. As was BMX standard procedure for the pros, both ABA and NBL were run three times to minimize luck and reward consistency. This performance that led to his victory as Grand National Champion (albeit not National No. 1) was the capstone of his reputation as being at his best under pressure at very important races.

American Bicycle Association (ABA)

- 1984 Canadian-American (Can-Am) Pro Champion
- 1984 "AA" pro Grandnational Champion
- 1984 National No.2 Pro
- 1985 National No.3 Pro
- 1987 "AA" Pro Grandnational Champion
- 1988 "AA" Pro Grandnational Champion
- 1989 "AA" Pro U.S. Gold Cup West Champion
- 1989 "AA" Pro U.S. Gold Cup East Champion
- 1990 "AA" Pro U.S. Open West Champion
- 1989 National No.1 Pro Prize won: 1989 Chevy S-10 pickup
- 1990 National No.1 Pro Prize won: 1990 Isuzu pickup
- 1994 "AA" Pro Gold Cup West Champion
- 1994 "AA" Pro Grandnational Champion
- 1994 National No.1 Pro Prize won: 1995 Ford F150 pickup truck
- 1995 National No.1 Pro* Prize Won: 1995 Jeep Wrangler
- 1994 Pro Supercup Champion Prize: Big screen television by Herda

*There is controversy surrounding Ellis's 1995 title. That year, Frenchman Christophe Lévêque was the actual points winner. He was not awarded the title or the automobile prize that went with it, due to a rule in the ABA rule book that required the winner of the ABA No. 1 Pro title to be a U.S. citizen. Lévêque was permitted to race the season and collect points, but the rule remained, as another ABA rule prevented rule changes from being made during a race season. As a result, Ellis was rewarded the title. The controversial rule was changed for the following season.

United States Bicycle Motocross Association (USBA)

- None

International Bicycle Motocross Federation (IBMXF)*

- 1985, 1987, 1988, 1993 Pro World Champion
- 1995 20" Superclass Silver Medal World Champion

Fédération Internationale Amateur de Cyclisme (FIAC)*

- None (FIAC did not have a strictly professional division during its existence).

Union Cycliste Internationale (UCI)*

- None

*Note: Beginning in 1991 the IBMXF and FIAC, the amateur cycling arm of the UCI, had been holding joint world championship events as a transitional phase in merging which began in earnest in 1993. Beginning with the 1996 season, the IBMXF and FIAC completed the merge,r and both ceased to exist as independent entities being integrated into the UCI. Beginning with the 1996 World Championships held in Brighton, England, the UCI officially held and sanctioned BMX world championships, and inherited all precedents, records, streaks, etc. from both the IBMXF and FIAC.

Independent Invitationals and Pro Series/single races

- 1983 "B" Pro and Pro Trophy Jag Super Bowl World Champion

=== Awards and recognition ===
- Named one of BMX Action's "Terrible Ten" of the 10 world's fastest amateurs to watch in 1983 as potential future top pros.
- Named as one of BMX Action's "1984's Hottest Rookie Pros."
- 1990 BMX Plus! "Racer of the Year", with 61% of the vote, 846 votes of approximately 1,387 cast. Won a Yamaha RT-180 MX motorcycle.
- 1990 Go Number One Racer Award (NORA) Cup winner.
- 1991 BMX Plus! "Racer of the Year" with 42% of the vote. Won a custom painted helmet by Bob's Krazy Brush.
- 1994 & 1996 winner of the ABA BMXer magazine "Racer of the Year" award.
- 1995 BMX Plus! "Racer of the Year"
- 1996 BMX Plus! "Racer of the Year" with 22% of the votes cast.
- 1991 Go Number One Racer Award (NORA) Cup winner**
- 1998 Snap BMX Magazine*** NORA Cup winner with 20.2% of the vote. Won Honda CR-125 motocross motorcycle.
- On the cover of 48 various BMX magazine covers. The July 1982 issue of BMX Plus! was his first.
- 1998 ABA Hall of Fame inductee.

* Go was BMX Action/Freestylin's new name until its demise in 1992.

**This was the last NORA Cup awarded before Go ceased publishing. The NORA Cup would not be awarded for another six years until 1998, when Snap magazine brought it back, with Ellis winning in 1998.

*** Snap BMX Magazine, by acquiring the rights to the NORA Cup, became the spiritual heir to BMX Action/Freestylin magazine, which ceased publication in 1992 as GO magazine.

=== Significant injuries ===
Ellis has had few notable injuries over his career, which explains in part its 15-year longevity.

- Had a hand injury that kept him out of the 1995 ABA Winternationals in Scottsdale, Arizona (held on the weekend of March 19, 1996).
- Received a toe injury when the starting gate fell on it during a practice session at the 1996 UCI World Championships in Brighton, England. He stayed overnight in an English hospital before being flown back to the United States for surgery. He was laid up for approximately five months before returning to the circuit in November 1996.

=== Racing traits and habits ===
As a professional he was described as emotionless at races.

== Post-BMX career ==
After his BMX career, Ellis revisited motorcycle motocross. He also likes to relax riding his Harley-Davidson motorcycle. Unlike many former top pro BMXers, he has never raced again in BMX after his retirement in 1998. At his last NBL race, the 1998 NBL Grand National, in which he scored a perfect 1-1-1 score, i.e. winning all three of the mains, he made a vow not to come back after he retired.

e became the non-racing team manager of the Nirve BMX Team in early June 1999.
