= David Clinton =

American bicycle motocross rider (born 1960)

Personal information
- Full name: David Clinton
- Nickname: "Dynamite"
- Born: January 2, 1960 (age 66) Sun Valley, California, U.S.
- Height: 1.62 m (5 ft 4 in) (1975)
- Weight: 61.2 kg (135 lb) (1975–79)

Cycling career
- Sport: Cycling
- Current team: Retired
- Discipline: Bicycle Motocross (BMX)
- Role: Racer
- Rider type: Off Road

Amateur teams
- 1972–1973: Pedalers West
- 1973–1974: Rick's Bike Shop
- 1974: Kawasaki Motors
- 1974: Dirtmaster
- 1974–1976: Kawasaki Motors
- 1976–1977: Jimmy Weinart

Professional teams
- 1977: Jimmy Weinart
- 1977: D.G. Performance Specialist
- 1978: Shimano/Diamondback
- 1979: Redline Engineering
- 1979: D.G. Performance Specialist
- 1979: Shimano Sales Corporation
- 1979–1982: Diamondback

David Clinton (born January 2, 1960, in Sun Valley, California) is an "Old School" former professional Bicycle Motocross (BMX) racer whose prime competitive years were from 1973 to 1979. Nicknamed "Dynamite" early in his career David Clinton could be truthfully said to be the sport's first true superstar. He was the first racer to win an official National No.1 plate of any kind when the first BMX sanctioning body, the National Bicycle Association (NBA), introduced the title in 1975. During the previous year he won the junior class division of a series of what could be called proto Nationals, a part of the first major BMX series, when he took first place in the Junior class at the Yamaha Bicycle Gold Cup which decided the California State Champion. Clinton along with Scot Breithaupt and John "Snaggletooth" Palfryman participated in the first true National sanctioned by the NBA in Phoenix, Arizona, in 1975 and became the first official pro in BMX in 1977 (although Thom Lund could be considered the first BMXer to race for money. He raced for a share of the US$200 purse and won the Scot Breithaupt sponsored Saddleback Park race in Irvine, California, in 1975).

== Racing career ==
Note: In the early days of professional racing, 1977 and prior, many tracks offered small purse prize money to the older racers of an event, even before the official sanctioning bodies offered prize money in formal divisions themselves. Hence some early "professionals" like Stu Thomsen turning "pro" in 1975 at 16 years old where racing for small amounts of money at track events when offered even before the NBA, regarded as the first true national BMX sanctioning body, had a professional division. For the sake of consistency and standardization noted professional first are for the first pro races for prize money offered by official BMX sanctioning bodies and not independent track events. Professional first are also on the national level unless otherwise indicated.

Started Racing: 1971 at age 11. He was doing halftime show BMX races between the minicycle races at the Indian Dunes track in Valencia, California.

Sanctioning Body: None.

First race result: Unknown.

First win (local): Some time in 1971 at the Indian Dunes Motorcycle Motocross track in Valencia, California At the time some BMX tracks were made out of active MX tracks.

First sponsor: Pedalers West 1972.

First national win: Yamaha Bicycle Gold Cup Final on September 14, 1974, in Junior class* age 14. While the Yamaha Bicycle Gold Cup was not a true national-no national points were awarded to any participant who resided outside of the state-it was the very first large, heavily promoted race series up to that time in BMX. Clinton's first true national win was in 14 & Over Expert at the National Bicycle Association (NBA) Tri-State National in Tucson, Arizona, on March 30, 1975. It was the second true national in BMX history. The first one was the previous day's NBA Winternationals held in Phoenix, Arizona. John George won the 14 & Over Expert class. Because records only published the first four placers it is not known through available public records what position Clinton came in that day, or even if he made the main.

Turned professional: 1977 at 17 years of age with the NBA. He was the very first official pro.

First Professional race result**: First place at NBA National in Chandler, Arizona, on April 30, 1978.

First Professional win: See above.

Retired: Late 1980 at age 20. He made a brief comeback in 1982 at the ABA Fall Nationals in Lancaster, California, on October 16 and 17 but a preexisting knee injury forced him to retire from BMX permanently. He also was still doing obsolete one pedal starts when most other pros (Andy Patterson being one notable exception) had adapted the quicker reaction two pedal balance starts. His failure to adapt also contributed to his truncated comeback.

Height & weight at height of his career (1975–1978): Ht:5'3" Wt:135-~230 lbs.
Note: the 230 pounds figure is for roughly at the end of the peak in his career.

*Classifications at the time were determined by size and weight and not age and proficiency, so his age in this case is irrelevant. The Yamaha Bicycle Gold Cup was the first event that could be referred to as a "National" to be held in BMX.
**At the time there was no separate pro class for pros due to the relatively small number of pros. They raced with the 16 Experts, making it a Pro/Am class essentially. This is why during the early years of the pro division the national number one racer of a sanctioning body could be either an amateur or professional. This practice continued until the NBA's 1979 season in which the pros earned separate pro points and a separate pro plate from the amateurs.

=== Career factory and major bike shop sponsors ===
Note: This listing only denotes the racer's primary sponsors. At any given time a racer could have numerous co-sponsors. Primary sponsorships can be verified by BMX press coverage and sponsor's advertisements at the time in question. When possible exact dates are given.

==== Amateur ====
- Pedalers West: 1972–1973
- Rick's Bike Shop: 1973-August 1, 1974
- Kawasaki Motors: August 1, 1974-Late August 1974
- Dirtmaster Racing Products: Late August 1974-September 1974
- Kawasaki Motors: September 1974-July 1976. Clinton briefly "retired" from BMX to race MX in early 1976 for his then sponsor Kawasaki Motors.
- Jimmy Weinart (Laguna Distributing): Late September 1976-April 1977. David Clinton would turn pro with this sponsor.

==== Professional ====
- Jimmy Weinart: Late September 1976-April 1977.
- D.G. Performance Specialist (The initials stood for Dan Hangsleben, Gary Harlow): April 1977-December 31, 1977
- Shimano Sales Corporation/Diamondback: January 1, 1978 – December 31, 1978. Diamondback was Clinton's second Primary sponsor, providing the racing frame.
- Redline Engineering: January 1, 1979-August 1979.
- D.G. Performance Specialist: August 1979-September 1979. Brief one-month stay. This was Clinton's second stint with DG.
- Shimano Sales Corporation: September 1979-December 1979.
- Diamondback (Centurion): January 1980-December 1982. In the last months of his career (after a very brief racing comeback) and after his retirement he was the supervisor of the sales department at Western States Imports, the parent company of Centurion Bicycle Company.

=== Career bicycle motocross titles ===
Note: Listed are District, State/Provincial/Department, Regional, National, and International titles in italics. "Defunct" refers to the fact of that sanctioning body in question no longer existing at the start of the racer's career or at that stage of his/her career. Depending on point totals of individual racers, winners of Grand Nationals do not necessarily win National titles. Series and one off Championships are also listed in block. Only sanctioning bodies that were active during the racer's career are listed.

==== Amateur ====
Independent race events

- 1974 Junior class California State Champion at the Yamaha Bicycle Gold Cup (a.k.a. the Bicycle Motocross Championship of California State).
- 1975 15 & Up Yamaha Bicycle Gold Cup Champion.

National Bicycle Association (NBA)

- 1973 12 Western States Champion.
- 1973 California Champion.*
- 1974 13 Western States Champion.
- 1975 14 & Over Expert Western States Champion
- 1975 National No.1.

*Since at this time the only BMX races held in the nation were all in California, this was tantamount to a national championship.

American Bicycle Association (ABA Founded January 1975, defunct December 1975)*

- 1975 National No.1

*This ABA should not be confused with the organization founded by Merle Menennga in Chandler, Arizona, in 1977. This organization is the American Bicycle Association that was formed in January 1975 by Bob Bailey in Torrance, California but ended operations in December 1975 after going bankrupt. David Clinton was its one and only No.1 racer.

National Bicycle League (NBL)

- None

National Pedal Sport Association (NPSA)

- 1975 National No.1

American Bicycle Association (ABA Founded 1977)

- None

==== Professional ====
National Bicycle Association (NBA)

- 1978 Open Pro & Overall Western States Champion.
- 1978 Pro Class Grandnational Champion.

National Bicycle League (NBL)

- None

American Bicycle Association (ABA)

- None

United States Bicycle Motocross Association (USBA)

- None

International Bicycle Motocross Federation (IBMXF)

- None

Independent Invitationals and Pro Series Championships

- 1977 16 Expert NBA/Mongoose Exhibition winner (Second main race; Jeff Bottema won the first 16 Expert main).†

†In 1977 the NBA held an exhibition race during the halftime period between the Philadelphia Eagles and the Los Angeles Rams NFL football game at the Los Angeles Coliseum in Los Angeles in August 1977 (the Rams moved from Los Angeles to St. Louis, Missouri, in 1994). The racers in the mains during halftime were invited after an NBA race at Rancho San Diego on September 19, 1976, in San Diego

=== Notable accolades ===
David Clinton has numerous first attributed to him:

- He became one of the first officially recognized title holders in what was the first BMX championship series when he became the Junior Class California State Champion of the Yamaha Bicycle Gold Cup series along with Stu Thomsen (Expert Champion) and Mark Whitehead (Novice Champion). He also set the fastest elapse time for a single lap on the quarter mile course at 69.9 seconds.
- He is considered to be the sport's first Superstar.
- He was the first factory sponsored rider in the sport of BMX.
- He has been credited with performing the first "Table Top", a BMX stunt maneuver. He was photographed performing in July 1975 at Saddleback track.
- He earned very first National No.1 plate of any kind. It was with the NBA in 1975.
- He became the very first licensed professional of a sanctioning body in 1977, the NBA.
- He became the very first ABA BMX Hall of Fame Inductee in 1985.
- He was one of the founding members of the Professional Racing Organization (PRO) racers guild in 1977.
- He was inducted into the United States Bicycling Hall of Fame on October 17, 2006

=== Significant injuries ===
- Had several knee injuries late in the 1977 season, including one during a practice session that laid him up for six months, putting him out of contention for the NBA national number one plate. These knee problems would eventually force him into retirement some three years later and keep him there after a brief comeback attempt in 1982.

=== Miscellaneous ===
- Clinton shares his birthdate of January 2 with another BMX icon: Doug Davis, who was born on January 2, 1969. Clinton was born in 1960

== Post BMX career ==
- He raced Mountain bikes for a time during the 1980s as would a lot of former and present BMX racers would and have gone on to do; some simultaneously.
- As of 2005 he is the inside sales manager and in charge of answers bmx co-factory program.

== BMX press magazine interviews and articles ==
- "What Makes David Run" Bicyicle Motocross News September 1974 Vol.1 No.4 pg.19
- "David Clinton" Bicycle Motocross Action January/February 1979 Vol.4 No.2 pg.40
- "Flashback: Dave Clinton" Snap BMX Magazine October 1999 Vol.6 Iss.8 No.36 pg.83 Retrospective of the racer.
- "Dave Clinton" "Bicycle Motocross Collector On line Magazine" April 2005 Old School BMX Dave Clinton Interview

== BMX magazine covers ==
Note: Only magazines that were in publication at the time of the racer's career(s) are listed unless specifically noted.

Bicycle Motocross News:

- October 1974 Vol.1 No.5 with Bobby Encinas
- December 1974 Vol.1 No.7
- January 1975 Vol.2 No.1 with Bobby Encinas, John George, & Jack Shannon
- July 1975 Vol.2 No.6
- May 1977 Vol.4 No.5

Minicycle/BMX Action & Super BMX:

Bicycle Motocross Action & Go:

- BMX Action September/October 1978 Vol.3 No.5 with Scott Clark and Harry Leary in second and third respectively.

BMX Plus!:

- January 1979 Vol.2 No.1 In insert. Anthony Sewell main image.
- March 1980 Vol.3 No.3

Total BMX:

- None

Bicycles and Dirt (ABA publication):

- None

NBA World & NBmxA World' (The NBA/NBmxA official membership publication under two names):

Bicycles Today & BMX Today (The NBL official membership publication under two names):

ABA Action, American BMXer, BMXer (The ABA official membership publication under three names):
