= Mike Poulson =

American bicycle motocross rider (born 1965)

Personal information
- Full name: Michael Poulson
- Born: January 4, 1965 (age 61) Ogden, Utah, United States
- Height: 1.8 m (5 ft 11 in)
- Weight: 79.4 kg (175 lb)

Cycling career
- Sport: Cycling
- Current team: Retired
- Discipline: Bicycle Motocross (BMX)
- Role: Racer
- Rider type: Off Road

Amateur teams
- 1979-1980: Bingham Schwinn Cyclery
- 1980: Pro Neck
- 1980-1983: Schwinn Bicycle Company

Professional teams
- 1983-1986: Schwinn Bicycle Company
- 1987: Binghams Schwinn Cyclery

Michael Poulson (born January 4, 1965, in Ogden, Utah U.S., later raised in Layton, Utah) is an American "Old School" former professional Bicycle Motocross (BMX) racer whose prime competitive years were from 1981 to 1987.

== Racing career milestones ==
Note: Professional first are for the national level of competition unless otherwise indicated. Started racing: Early 1978. As it often happens, a friend got him interested in racing.

Sanctioning body:

First race result: First place at a Layton, Utah, track in 12-year-old class. He was actually 13 years old but according to the rules of that track you raced the age class of the age you where on October 1 during the season, therefore he was 12 on October 1, 1977 and raced in the 12-year-old class accordingly even after turning thirteen on January 4, 1978

First win (local): See above.

Home sanctioning body district(s): National Bicycle Association (NBA) District "P" (Colorado, Wyoming and Utah);

First sponsor: Bingham Schwinn Cyclery

First national race result: The 1979 Corona Mini-National. Finished near the bottom of the 14 Open main with a sixth place. Signed up for Expert event though he was a novice. Did not make Expert main.

First national win: The February 10, 1980 American Bicycle Association (ABA) Winter Nationals at Chandler, Arizona, in 15 Expert.

Turned professional: September 1983 Age 17.

First Professional race result: First in "B" Pro at the National Bicycle League (NBL) Celebrity Race For Childhelp USA/International in Azusa, California, on January 22, 1984. He also got a second place in Pro Open. This was a charity event. The purse was only US$40 (US$79.19 in 2007 Cost of Living Calculator) and 100% payback for the top pro finishers.

Note: This race is not to be confused with the NBL Azuza National held on March 3, 1984 at the same facility which counted in the pros standings toward the National No.1 Plate.

First Professional win: See above

First Senior Pro* race result: Fourth in "AA" pro at the ABA Spring National in San Francisco, California, on March 11, 1984. He won US$160 the equivalent to US$316.77 in 2007.

First Senior Pro win: In "A" pro at the NBL National in Brookville, Ohio, on May 26, 1984 He won US$800, or US$1,583.83 in 2007.

Retired: 1988. After many injuries and the grind of racing on every weekend for over a decade and just not having a winning attitude he quietly quit after a stint as a teaching pro at the Woodward BMX camp in Woodward, Pennsylvania.

Height & weight at height of career (1985): Ht:5'11" Wt:~175 lbs.

*In the NBL "A"/"Elite" pro; in the ABA "AA" pro.

=== Career factory and major bike shop sponsors ===
Note: This listing only denotes the racer's primary sponsors. At any given time a racer could have numerous ever-changing co-sponsors. Primary sponsorships can be verified by BMX press coverage and sponsor's advertisements at the time in question. When possible exact dates are given.

==== Amateur ====
- Bingham Schwinn Cyclery: 1979-Early February 1980 (as primary sponsor).
- Pro Neck: February 11, 1980 – February 17, 1980. He raced one weekend for them as promised at the NBA Winternationals in Las Vegas, Nevada, on February 17 then accepted Schwinn's offer of sponsorship.
- Schwinn Bicycle Company: February 18, 1980-November 1986. Mike would turn Pro with this sponsor.

==== Professional ====
- Schwinn Bicycle Company: February 18, 1980-December 1986. Schwinn drops its racing team due to 80% of their 20" bicycle sales were freestyle bicycles and not racing machines After Schwinn dropped its racing team after the 1986 season he accepted a sales position at Schwinn Sales West in Southern California. As for racing, he was essentially in semi retirement, racing mostly on the east coast near Woodward BMX Racing and Freestyle Center in Woodward, Pennsylvania, where he was a teaching professional teaching young aspiring BMX racers at the camp.
- Bingham's Schwinn Cyclery: January 1987-December 1987. His primary sponsor while he was a teaching pro after the Schwinn factory racing team was dropped. Bingham's was the same sponsor he started his career with.

=== Career bicycle motocross titles ===
Note: Listed are District, State/Provincial, Regional, National, and International titles in italics. "Defunct" refers to the fact of that sanctioning body in question no longer existing at the start of the racer's career or at that stage of his/her career. Depending on point totals of individual racers, winners of Grand Nationals do not necessarily win National titles.

==== Amateur ====
National Bicycle Association (NBA)

- None

National Bicycle League (NBL)

- 1980 Jag 15 Expert World Champion (NBL sanctioned)

American Bicycle Association (ABA)

- 1979, 1980 Utah District No.1
- 1980 15 Expert Grandnational Champion

United States Bicycle Motocross Association (USBA)

- None

International Bicycle Motocross Federation (IBMXF)

- None

==== Professional ====
National Bicycle Association (NBA)

- None

National Bicycle League (NBL)

- None

American Bicycle Association (ABA)

- None

United States Bicycle Motocross Association (USBA)

- None

International Bicycle Motocross Federation (IBMXF)

- 1984 Celebrity race winner.

Due to the dearth of professional participation in general and American involvement in the competition in particular there was no Professional class in the IBMXF World Championships held in Suzuka, Japan. Indeed, Mike Poulson was the only pro of any nation to participate. Instead a select number of older amateur experts from numerous nations were slated to race him. He won.

Pro Series Championships

== Notable accolades ==
- Named one of the "Terrible Ten", BMX Action's pick of fastest amateur racers in the world in 1983
- Named one of "1984's Hottest Rookie Pros" by BMX Action magazine.

== Significant injuries ==
- Injured knee on June 23, 1981, at a race five days before the ABA Great Salt Lake National in Salt Lake City, Utah. Told to stay off it he raced anyway and got a first in 15 & Over open. He went on to win the 15 & Over trophy dash.
- Broke collarbone on March 28, 1982, at the ABA Lone Star Nationals in San Antonio, Texas.
- Broke leg just above the ankle in July 1982 while recovering from the broken collar bone. He was testing a friend's home made mini-bike Poulson ran into a curb. He was laid up for almost six months total. His first race back was at the ABA East Coast nationals in North Bergen, New Jersey, on October 3, 1982. In mid December 1983 he was scheduled to be laid up a further two months after having the metal plate holding his tibia together removed. However, he raced the Azusa, California NBL Childhelp Celebrity Race approximately five weeks later on January 22, 1984. It was also his first pro race.
- Hyper-extended three toes on his right foot testing a two speed shifting system at home shortly after the October 28, 1984 United States Bicycle Motocross Association (USBA) Azusa, California National. He missed the following November 4 ABA Rockford, Illinois Fall Nationals.
- Dislocated shoulder at the January 9, 1985, ABA Pro Spectacular in Shreveport, Louisiana He injured himself on the Stu Thomsen designed first jump which was subsequently removed for the Cajun Nationals held on the 10th and 11th.
- Dislocated his right arm on or around September 7, 1985, a week after the NBL Grand Nationals while playing baseball. It seems that it was the third or fourth time it had happened and he schedule surgery for later in September. A week before that operation he dislocated his left arm playing football. He had operations on both arms and was laid up until March 1986.

== Miscellaneous and Trivia ==
- He was featured in the book BMX Racing Fever (Galen Anderson, Learning Systems Associates 1981), a book geared to those just beginning in BMX racing.
- He appeared in an episode of the children's program Big Blue Marble (Program #061) which depicted his competing in the 1981 ABA Winternational and then at his home in Layton, Utah. It aired in the Fall of 1981.
- He shares the same birthday and birthyear as fellow racer Brian Patterson: January 4, 1965

== Post BMX career ==
He was offered a sales job by the Schwinn Bicycle Co. with a position in California but he did not take it. He did not want to move from his home state. He had potions with Bingham's Cyclery a local department store and eventually went into his father's lawn sprinkler business.

== BMX magazine covers ==
Bicycle Motocross News:

- None

Minicycle/BMX Action & Super BMX:

- June 1981 Vol.8 No.6 in upper right corner insert. Main image Eric Shimp. (SBMX)

Bicycle Motocross Action & Go:

- March 1985 Vol.10 No.3 (BMXA)

BMX Plus!:

- June 1982 Vol.5 No.6

Bicycles and Dirt:

- February 1983 Vol.1 No.6

Total BMX:

NBA World & NBmxA World (The official NBA/NBmxA membership publication):

Bicycles Today & BMX Today (The official NBL membership publication under two names):

ABA Action, American BMXer, BMXer (The official ABA membership publication under three names):

USBA Racer (The official USBA membership publication):

== BMX and general press magazine interviews and articles ==
- "New Wave Superstars" Bicycle Motocross Action August 1980 Vol.5 No.8 pg.37 Mini biography with six other BMX newcomers.
- "Mike Poulson: Utah's Mr. Clean!" BMX Plus! August 1981 Vol.4 No.8 pg.18
- "ABA Number Ones from Coast-to-Coast:Utah"Super BMX October 1981 Vol.8 No.10 pg.64 Mini article in listing of District number ones across the country.
- "Mike Poulson: Rags To Riches" BMX Action June 1982 Vol.7 No.6 pg.36 Full page sidebar.
- "The Mike Poulson Story; Or How Mike Gets The Point" Bicycle and Dirt February 1983 Vol.1 No.6 pg.33
- "Five Minutes with Mike Poulson"BMX Action March 1984 Vol.9 No.3 pg.52 side bar.
- Mini interview during North Park NBL National BMX Action November 1984 Vol.9 No.11 pg.22
- "Burnin' Up The Audio Tape With Schwinn's Finest--Mike Poulson" BMX Action March 1985 Vol.10 No.3 pg.15 full page sidebar.
- "How I Won That Race" Super BMX & Freestyle April 1985 Vol.12 No.4 pg.62 Mike Poulson describes how he won his first Senior Pro (NBL-"A"/ABA-"AA") in Brookville, Ohio.
