= United Bicycle Racers Association =

The United Bicycle Racers (UBR) (initially and briefly known as World Bike Riders (WBR)) was a short-lived Bicycle Motocross (BMX) racing sanctioning body based in Modesto, California which was started by John Valdez, a bike shop owner, on his 18th birthday that lasted from 1977 to 1983. At its peak it had 34 tracks in California and Nevada. His philosophy was to cater to the local racer and deemphasized the focus on National events. Still, because of its California base, it did attract many of the national caliber pro racers who normally do not attend the events of small sanctioning bodies.

The UBR went out of business due to bankruptcy and ceased operations early in 1983.

== Vital statistics ==
Milestone	Event details
Founded:	May 1977.
Motto(s)/Slogan(s):	"We're here for you."
Years of operation:	1977–1982
Original Headquarters:	Modesto, California.
Last Headquarters:	Same
Original Owner:	John Valdez
Last Owner:	Same
Original President:	John Valdez
Last President:	Steven littrell
Original Vice President:	Steven littrell
Last Vice President:	
Employees (peak):	
First track:	King's BMX Raceway in Modesto.
Peak claimed number of tracks:	32 in 1982
Claimed present number of tracks:	
Peak claimed number of members:	5,000+
First sanctioned race:	
First National:	
Number of nationals per year:	Approx. six (including Grand National).
Span:	Regional. Tracks in California and Nevada.
First Grand National:	October 17, 1979 Centennial Coliseum Reno, Nevada. It's Pro purse was USD$1,500
Last Grand National:	1982
In house newspaper:	UBR Scene
In house magazine:	None

== Proficiency and division classes and advancement method ==
Division	Details
Amateur Proficiency and age levels 20 inch class:	Junior (Novice equivalent), Expert. 5 & 6 Junior (Boys & girls), then 7 Junior to 16 & over Expert in one year steps. Girls could race with the boys (thanks to Cheri Elliott in 1982) but were barred from Powder Puff (the Girls classes) if they did. Amateur Open: 7 & under to 16 & over in 2 year steps. Age classifications only ||
Amateur Cruiser:	13 & Under, 14–16, 17–22, 23–34, 35 & Over. Age classifications only
Girls 20 inch:	5-6 girls to 14 & over girls in 2 year steps. Age classifications only, no proficiency levels. Amateur only.
Professional Classes:	Pro Cruiser, Pro 20". Open Expert, a Pro/Am division open to both Pros and Expert level racers. Men only.
Qualifying system:	Moto system a.k.a. Olympic System a.k.a. Cumulative Scoring System.

== United Bicycle Racers Association list of National number ones ==
Pro Nat. #1 Men

- 1977 Ray Valdez
- 1978 Ray Valdez
- 1979 Frank Post
- 1980 Kevin McCarthy
- 1981 Ronnie Anderson
- 1982 Scott Fifield

Pro Cruiser Nat. #1 Men

- 1977 CDNE
- 1978 CDNE
- 1979 CDNE
- 1980
- 1981 Brent Patterson
- 1982 Jess Guymon

Amat. Nat. #1 Men

- 1977
- 1978 Wayne Brown
- 1979 Eddie Beloate
- 1980 Chris Torres
- 1981 Danny Steplight
- 1982 Justin Green

Amat. Nat. #1 Cruiser

- 1977 CDNE
- 1978 CDNE
- 1979 CDNE
- 1980
- 1981 Grant Hudson
- 1982

Amat. Nat. #1 Women

- 1977 CDNE
- 1978 CDNE
- 1979 CDNE
- 1980 CDNE
- 1981 Cheri Elliott
- 1982 Cheri Elliott

Amat. Nat. #1 Sidehack

- 1977
- 1978
- 1979 Scott Barrette & Craig "gOrk" Barrette
- 1980 Chuck & Kelly Croffoot
- 1981 Scott Barrette & Craig "gOrk" Barrette
- 1982

== See also ==
- American Bicycle Association
- National Bicycle Association
- National Bicycle League
- National Pedal Sport Association
- United States Bicycle Motocross Association
