= National Bicycle Association =

Former sports sanctioning body

The National Bicycle Association (NBA), later known as the National Bicycle Motocross Association (NbmxA), was a United States–based Bicycle Motocross (BMX) sports sanctioning body originally based in Soledad, California, that was created by Ernie Alexander in 1973 and ceased operations as an independent body in 1981. It was the first and for its first few years until 1980 the largest sanctioning body in the United States concerning BMX. It was known for its pioneering works in founding the organized sport of BMX. It was both the first true sanctioning body and the first nation-spanning one (as opposed to the regional ones that emerged), although at first it was concentrated in the west coast of the United States, where it was founded. It was the first body to hold true nationals in which racers coming from all over the country competed for points and in the case of professionals, money, to determine who would earn the right to run a National no. "1" plate in the several divisions and age classes the following year. It was the first sanctioning body to have a professional division, which was created as far back as late September 1974.

== History ==
Mr. Alexander was a former racer that promoted races at the famous Indian Dunes, built and managed by Walt James, where many movies and TV shows were filmed. On one occasion in 1970, he noticed a group of kids trying to organize a bicycle race with their Schwinn Sting-Rays and Sting-Ray like bikes. Being the motorcycle promoter he was he lent the kids a hand. At that moment the path to the NBA was set. Mr. Alexander opened the Yarnell track, a steep downhill course that was by our insurance concerned standards very steep, fast and hair raising. Speeds of 40-45 mph were not unheard of. It had more in common with today's Mountain Biking courses than a modern, well-groomed and safer (some say too safe) BMX tracks. The popularity of his races grew until it became practically a full-time job. In 1973 he decided to formalize it and create the National Bicycle Association modeled on the existing American Motorcycle Association (AMA) for motorcycle Motocross (MX). It rapidly grew in number of tracks and members spreading from Southern California. Tracks were eventually established as far as the East coast. The NBA became the first national governing body for BMX.

The famous Yamaha Bicycle Gold Cup events in 1974 could qualify as a quasi national in which it was a race series that was held sequentially at four different California tracks culminating in the series finale in Anaheim, California on September 14, 1974. However, the first true national occurred on March 30, 1975 in Phoenix, Arizona. This was the major first race held outside of California and in which national points were given both to those who raced outside and within of the state of California. The national would be held in the sanctioning body's one non-Californian track in Phoenix, Arizona (the Kartland Track located at 3610 West Indian School Road) and its members could race in a sanctioned event based in Arizona if they wished to come. This was in addition to many other first including the first BMX National number one Amateur racing title holder which was David Clinton. In 1976 the NBA created the first formal pro class and had its first No.1 pro, a twenty-year-old Scot Breithaupt. However, the first mention of a professional class by the NBA was in the October 1974 issue of Bicycle Motocross News at the Valley Youth Center track in Van Nuys, California:

"A new professional class for 14 and over experts is in effect"

This beats a previous claim of a proto-Pro class that was created in 1975 was when a pro race promoted by Scot Breithaupt at the Saddleback Park track in Irvine, California, with a US$200 purse. However, Tom Lund, the alleged pro denies this ever happening:

"Scott keeps telling me I won the 1st Pro race at Saddelback, he promoted it but I don't remember." ---Tom Lund, February 24, 2003 FatBMX.com

The NBA for the first six years of its existence it ruled the BMX world with these innovations despite the rise of other sanctioning bodies.

However, it closed its doors as an independent BMX governing body nine years after its founding due to falling membership and local tracks changing their affiliations to either the National Bicycle League (NBL) or American Bicycle Association (ABA) (see below). The final independent NBA Grand National held in Long Beach, California in 1981 and was the lowest attended since the NBA went national in 1975. The bulk of the Novice classes was not signing up for the big events, while Expert and Pro turnout was very good (there was no Intermediate or equivalent classes at the time). Overall a mere 600-700 (with 101 motos) sign ups were on hand for the NBA's season ending event. Over the previous season, sign ups never exceeded 750, At the time 1000 sign ups were the standard measure of a good turn out in for an average national during the season. It was said that partly responsible for the low turnout for the Grands was the fact that it was scheduled two weeks before Christmas when family and individual budgets were stretched and/or saving up for the upcoming Jag World Championships. Whatever the reasons, for the Grand Nationals, the premier event of the year for any sanctioning body, to have so low an attendance figure was almost disastrous. In contrast the 1980 NBA Grand Nationals which were also held in Long Beach had 1,0400 sign ups in 200 motos. The ABA had 1,917 sign ups in 257 motos for its 1980 Grand Nationals in Oklahoma City, Oklahoma and the NBL had 1,100 sign ups for its 1980 Grand Nationals in Evansville, Indiana.

The abandonment of the NBA by its racers and track operators to rival organizations was almost certainly due to the relaxed perhaps even negligent nature of the management toward keeping track of points and monetary awards to its pros and the scheduling its events. To a query as to when its Grand Nationals was going to be held in 1979: "We don't even know where it's going to be yet, so how can we know the date?" Both the NBL and the ABA had announced when and where their Grand nationals were being held. To a query as to who were the top money earners so far in 1979: "We don't keep track of how much the boys win". The ABA in contrast provided a list of its top ten purse winners; The NBL Bicycle Motocross Action magazine reported, did not yet have a pro class. The publisher and editor of BMX Action, Robert Osborn, summed it up: "(Heavy Sigh) Sometimes it's tough to understand the internal workings of the NBA". A probably cause for this lackadaisical attitude domestically was the desire to branch out the NBA on an international basis. In doing so, it neglected its base.

If they had a relax attitude internally to its racers and track operators it had an aggressive attitude to its main competitor the ABA. It was common for the NBA to deliberately schedule its qualifiers for its Grand Nationals against ABA nationals and its Grand Nationals to draw off racers who would otherwise attend those ABA events. Other questionable practices attributed to the NBA were post unusually high entrance fees at it Grand Nationals US$20 for amateurs and US$50 for pros, unusually high for the late 1970s. In additions racers were charged spectator fees, unheard of in the BMX world and perhaps the sporting world as a whole. Prior to entering one of their nationals, one had to be a member of the NBA. No other sanctioning body had this requirement. Other sanctioning bodies, ABA and NBL included honored the licenses from other organizations. The ABA honored the NBL licenses of those NBL racers who wanted to race its Grand Nationals for instance. The cumulative effects of these missteps were that by the end of 1979 the NBA was no longer the largest sanctioning body. That laurel went to the ABA.

To compound the mismanagement, the NBA entered secret sponsorship deals without the knowledge of Mongoose, the principal sponsor of the 1979 Mongoose NBmxA Grand National (the NBA had changed its name to the National Bicycle Motocross Association in 1979 so as not to conflict with the National Basketball Association.) allegedly defrauding the principal sponsor out of part of its sponsoring charge. Allowed BMX Plus!, BMX Action's rival BMX periodical to set up a wet bar right besides the racing track. BMX racing was still an overwhelmingly kids sport at the time despite the presence of 20-plus-year-old pros.

It was these mishandling of public relations which caused the reorganization of the NBmxA in 1981 to save it. The most public aspect of this reorganization was the resignation of the founder and President Ernie Alexander in January 1981. A new board of directors which was made up of previously silent new investors who previously infused the NBmxA with fresh funding installed Peter DeRaffaele as the new chief executive officer (CEO) and president of the NBmxA. According to reports the new investors where approached by Ernie Alexander for management help in September 1980 The board of directors elected DeRaffaele as CEO and went to the NBmxA's Newhall, California headquarters to assist. After the 1980 Grandnational Mr. Alexander allegedly told DeRaffaele that his help in the Newhall office was no longer necessary. The board asked for an accounting of the NBA's books. Mr. Alexander promised to produce them after the 1980 racer year end points were tabulated and distributed. Alexander resigned allegedly never producing the accounting. DeRaffaelle and the board decided not to fold the NBmxA and to rescue it. DeRallfe went to the abandoned NBmxA headquarters in Newhall and all he found was the year end points standings and 13,000 membership applications but no membership list. After moving the headquarters from Newhall to Fresno, California, it took approximately until April to reconstruct the mailing list, revising the rule book, getting the NBmxA publication NBmxA World restarted, sending out apologies for the delays to the membership and reestablishing relations with BMX industry heads.

From all accounts, the NBmxA did conducted very well operated Nationals for the 1981 season culminating in its last Grand National at Long Beach, California. The best feature of that national was its track. It got universal raves from all the pros, particularly the forthright Greg Hill: "It was good dirt, they didn't have to water it, the layout was good, everything was perfect, it was challenging". He thought so well of it he came back for three hours just to ride the course with the locals. Despite this, attendance as noted above was low as it had been for the NBmxA all year. This made the financial position of the NBmxA unrecoverable despite the improvements. At that point, the officers of the NBmxA approached the NBL with a merger proposal.

After the 1981 season, the NBmxA stopped sanctioning its own races and went into partnership with the National Bicycle League (NBL). The NBmxA management handled sponsor relations, race promotion, and marketing of NBL races. The NBL honored the NBmxA membership cards until they expired and absorbed the membership and tracks of the NBmxA. Eventually the NBmxA was folded into the NBL completely and Mr. Alexander's organization was gone.

This did not mean that Mr. Ernie Alexander was done with BMX. In February 1981, while the NBmxA was undergoing reorganization, Mr. Alexander formed a new sanctioning body, the World Wide Bicycle Motocross Association (WWBMXA) out of Chatsworth, California. The most prestigious race it was involved with was the Knott's Berry Farm Pepsi Cola Mongoose Grand Championships which was primarily sanctioned by the NBL and co-sanctioned by the WWBMXA and the United Bicycle Racers (UBR). He also designed the track at that event. Unfortunately it was short lived, gone from the scene by the middle of 1983, but to most accounts it put on professional well-run races with the Mongoose Grand Championships the feather in the cap and a graceful exit by Mr. Alexander from the BMX scene.

== Vital statistics ==
Statistics	Details
Founded	November 1, 1973
Motto(s)/Slogan(s)	
Years of operation	1973–1981
Original Headquarters	Newhall, California
Original Owner	Ernie Alexander (1973–1981)
Original President	Ernie Alexander (1973–1981)
Original Vice President	
Last Owner	National Bicycle League
Last President	Peter DeRaffaele (1981)
Last Vice President	Joseph DiFilippo (1981)
Last Headquarters	
Employees (peak)	
Span	National, with most of the tracks west of the Mississippi River.
First track	Soledad Sands Park in Acton, California.
First National	March 30, 1975 at the Kartland Track in Phoenix, Arizona. By 1978 the NBA had 50 tracks and 5,000 racers.
First Grand National	Sunday, November 23, 1975 at Randall Ranch in Newhall, California. 457 racers attended.
Claimed number of tracks (peak)	
In house newspaper	NBA World later called NBmxA World
In house magazine	None
Number of nationals per year (peak)	Approximately --- (including Grand National)
Last Grand National	On December 11–13, 1981 on the grounds of Veterans Memorial Stadium (part of the stadium parking lot) in Long Beach, California. Approximately 800 racers attended with 89 motos. Small by race standards of the time, particularly for year ending Grand Nationals. In contrast the 1981 National Bicycle League (NBL) Grand Nationals held during the previous September in St. Louis, Missouri had approximately 1,300 entries comprising 181 motos. and the approximately 2,500 racers that comprised the 1981 American Bicycle Association (ABA) Grand Nationals in Oklahoma City, Oklahoma few weeks before in late November.

== Proficiency and division class labels and advancement method ==
Class	Proficiency and/or age division
Amateur Proficiency levels 20 inch class	Novice, Expert. 5 & Under, 6 & 7 novice to 16 & Over Expert in one year steps. 6 & Under Open to 15 & Over Open in two-year steps.
Amateur Cruiser	14 & Under to 27 & Over Cruiser in two-year steps. Age classifications only, no proficiency levels. Men only.
Powder Puff (Girls) 20 inch	10 & Under, 11–13, 14 & Over. Age classifications only, no proficiency levels. Amateur only.
Professional Classes	Senior Open, Pro Cruiser, Pro 20". Men only.
Qualifying system	Moto system aka Olympic System aka Cumulative System.

== Operations ==
=== Governing districts ===
The NBA divided their territory into districts. There could be several districts within a state or a district encompassing several. This is different in practice from the NBL which did not divide its territory into districts, only following state lines for state commissioner administration purposes. The later ABA also had districts, often multiple ones in a state but only within state boundaries. In the early days of BMX the early to the mid-1970s, becoming the number one racer in the NBA's most populous district District "X" for Southern California/Los Angeles County was tantamount to a national no.1 since organized BMX hardly existed anywhere else (Indeed, the present version of BMX was created in Southern California), so the first "National" No.1 racer was from District "X" David Clinton in 1974 and John George in 1975. When the NBA Merged with the NBL after the 1981 season, the NBL absorbed some of the NBA's tracks but not its district structure. Below is at least a partial list of NBA districts.

- District "X" (Southern California/Los Angeles)
- District "N" (Northern California)
- District "S" (San Diego)
- District "A" (Arizona)
- District "K" (Oklahoma)
- District "T" (Texas)
- District "G" (New Jersey, New York, Maine, Rhode Island, Connecticut and Pennsylvania)
- District "P" (Colorado, Wyoming, Utah)
- District "V" (Las Vegas, Nevada, Small part of Northeastern California)

These are some of the more Notable Number one title holders from different states.

- Jeff Ruminer 1K
- Eddie Livingston 1T
- Bobby Encinas 1X
- Eddy King 1S
- Stanley Robinson 1N

== NBA National number ones by year ==
CDNE=Class did not exist. TDNE=Title did not exist.

Note: Dates reflect the year the racers *won* their plates, not the year they actually *raced* their No.1 plates. In other words, David Clinton won his No.1 plate in 1974 entitling him to race with #1 on his plate for the 1975 season. John George then won the No.1 plate in 1975 and raced with #1 on his plate during the 1976 racing season.

Pro* Nat.#1 Men
- 1974 David Clinton*
- 1975 John George*
- 1976 Scot Breithaupt**
- 1977 Stu Thomsen
- 1978 Stu Thomsen
- 1979 Scott Clark
- 1980 Anthony Sewell
- 1981 Scott Clark

Pro Cruiser Nat. #1 Men
- 1974 CDNE
- 1975 CDNE
- 1976 CDNE
- 1977 CDNE
- 1978 CDNE
- 1979 CDNE
- 1980 Jeff Kosmala
- 1981 Turnell Henry

Amat. Nat.#1 Men
- 1974 David Clinton*
- 1975 John George*
- 1976 Scot Breithaupt**
- 1977 Stu Thomsen***
- 1978 Stu Thomsen***
- 1979 Greg Hill****
- 1980 Donny Atherton
- 1981 Keith Gaynor

Amat. Nat.#1 Powder Puff
- 1974 Title did not exist
- 1975 Cheryl Tranbarger
- 1976 Cheryl Tranbarger
- 1977
- 1978
- 1979 Debbie Shobert
- 1980
- 1981

*The NBA did not have a true National no.1 until 1975 when the first true national was held. Until then No.1s were strictly district. However, since the NBA Southern California District was the largest by far in the country during those years (indeed, only in Arizona did the NBA have any districts outside of California) and John George in 1975 and before him David Clinton in 1974 where the district champions at the end of those seasons that made them National No.1s by default. In the case of David Clinton in 1974 almost no tracks existed outside of California and none of those were NBA sanctioned.

**The NBA did have a separate professional division beginning in 1976, but until 1979 the National No.1 plate was all around for every class, pro or amateur.

***The Number One pro title did not exist until 1979.

****NBA Pros were allowed to race in the Amateur class and hold the amateur title at the time, so Greg Hill, while a professional was eligible for and won the no. 1 Amateur title.

== See also ==
- American Bicycle Association
- National Bicycle League
- National Pedal Sport Association
- United Bicycle Racers Association
- United States Bicycle Motocross Association
