= Madeleine Dean =

American politician (born 1959)

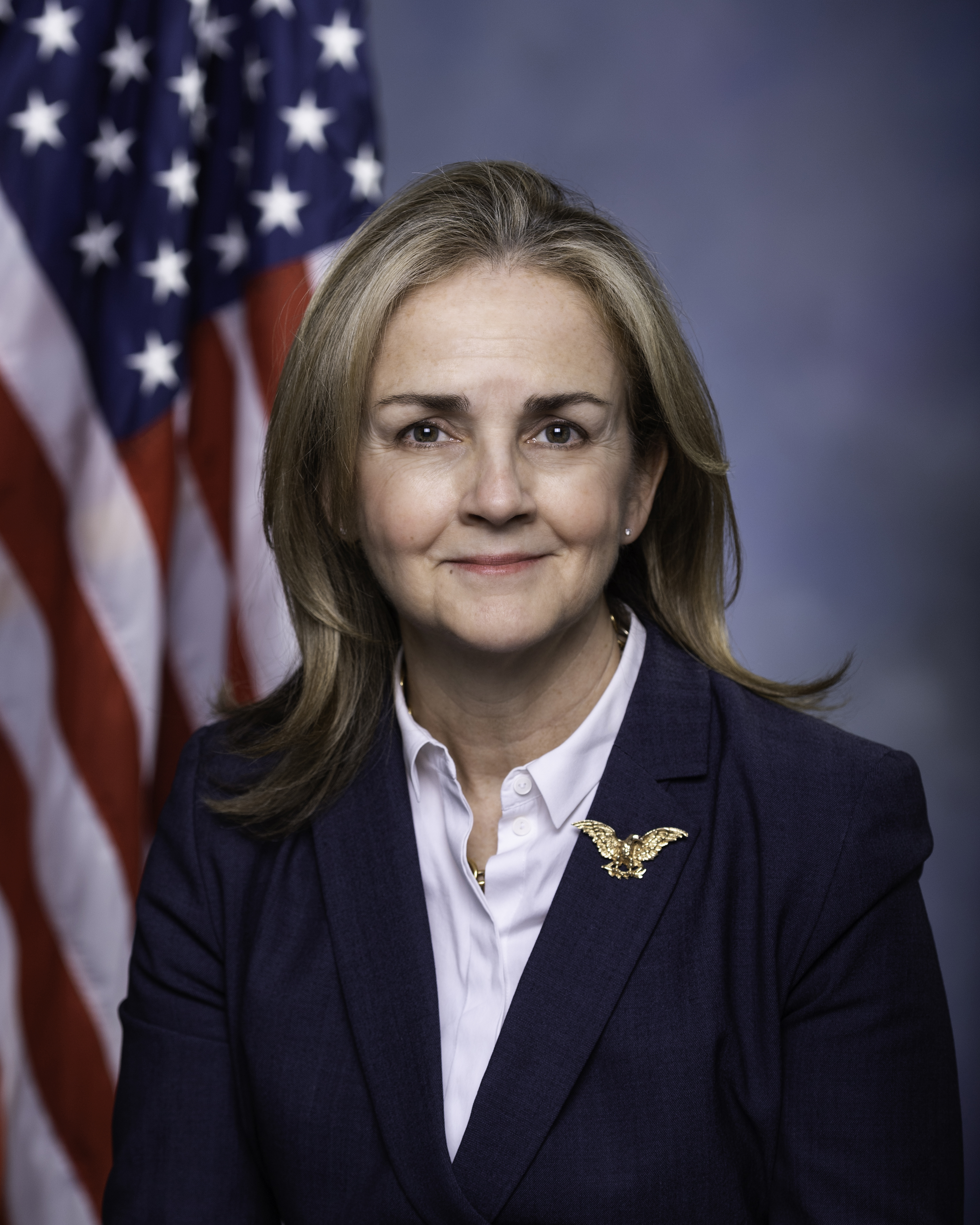
- Official portrait, 2019

Member of the U.S. House of Representatives from Pennsylvania's 4th district
- Incumbent
- Assumed office January 3, 2019
- Preceded by: Scott Perry (redistricted)

Member of the Pennsylvania House of Representatives from the 153rd district
- In office April 24, 2012 – November 30, 2018
- Preceded by: Josh Shapiro
- Succeeded by: Ben Sanchez

Personal details
- Born: June 6, 1959 (age 67) Glenside, Pennsylvania, U.S.
- Party: Democratic
- Spouse: Patrick Cunnane
- Children: 3
- Education: Montgomery County Community College (attended); La Salle University (BA); Widener University (JD); University of Pennsylvania (attended)
- Website: House website Campaign website

Madeleine Dean Cunnane (born June 6, 1959) is an American politician and lawyer serving as the U.S. representative for Pennsylvania's 4th congressional district since 2019. The district includes almost all of Montgomery County, a suburban county north of Philadelphia, as well as a northeastern portion of Berks County. Before being elected to Congress, Dean was a Democratic member of the Pennsylvania General Assembly, representing the 153rd district in the Pennsylvania House of Representatives.

== Early life and education ==
Dean was born on June 6, 1959, in Glenside, Pennsylvania, a suburb of Philadelphia. Her parents are Bob and Mary Dean. Madeleine is the youngest of their seven children. She graduated from Abington Senior High School, and attended Montgomery County Community College. She matriculated at La Salle University, where she was magna cum laude, and earned her Juris Doctor at the Widener University Delaware Law School. She also studied politics and public service at the Fels Institute of Government of the University of Pennsylvania.

== Career ==
After law school, Dean returned to the Philadelphia area and practiced law with the Philadelphia Trial Lawyers, going on to serve as executive director. She then opened a small, three-woman law practice in Glenside, and served as in-house counsel for her husband's growing bicycle business.

While raising three young sons, Dean turned to teaching. She served 10 years as an assistant professor of English at her alma mater, La Salle University, in Philadelphia, where she taught writing and ethics.

=== Early political career ===
Dean got her start in politics soon after graduating from high school, when she was elected to an Abington Township committee seat.

She volunteered on her first campaign, for Joe Hoeffel's reelection to the state legislature, in the same district seat she later held. On that campaign she met her future husband, Patrick Cunnane, then a 19-year-old elected committeeman.

=== Pennsylvania House of Representatives ===
Having worked and volunteered in politics for decades, and her children grown, Dean was asked to become a public servant herself, serving as Abington Township commissioner, and ran for state representative in 2012. In the State House, she prioritized social issues such as addiction, equal rights, access to healthcare, ethics, criminal justice reform, and gun violence.

After the Sandy Hook Elementary School shooting, Dean and Dan Frankel co-founded the gun violence prevention caucus, PA SAFE Caucus. The caucus is a self-described coalition of legislators and advocates dedicated to curbing the sale of illegal guns.

In 2015, Dean was appointed to the Governor's Commission for Women, a commission designed to advise the governor on policies and legislation that promote equality issues ranging from sexual assault to business initiatives. In 2017, she was elected chair of the Southeast Delegation of the Pennsylvania House Democrats, composed of 22 House Democrats representing nine counties.

She served on several committees, including Appropriations, Judiciary, Policy, Urban Affairs, State Government, and Finance, of which she was vice-chair.

Dean stated in 2014: "We know that the number one issue with voters is education and how we fund our public schools". Regarding the Pennsylvania education budget for 2013, the then-state Representative said: "How we educate our kids tells us how our economy will be." In that same instance, she highlighted the issue of public school funding.

== U.S. House of Representatives ==
=== Elections ===
==== 2018 ====
In February 2018, after a significant change in Pennsylvania's congressional districts mandated by the Supreme Court of Pennsylvania, Dean announced she would end her campaign for lieutenant governor and instead run for Congress in the 4th district. The district had previously been the 13th, represented by two-term fellow Democrat Brendan Boyle. But the 13th's share of Philadelphia, including Boyle's home, was drawn into the 2nd district, and Boyle opted to run for reelection there.

On May 15, Dean defeated two challengers, Shira Goodman and former Congressman Joe Hoeffel, in the Democratic primary. In the general election she defeated Republican money manager Dan David with 63.45% of the vote to his 36.55%. She was one of four Democratic women elected to Congress from Pennsylvania in 2018. The others were Mary Gay Scanlon, Chrissy Houlahan and Susan Wild. The state's delegation had previously been all male.

==== 2020 ====
Dean ran for reelection and defeated the Republican nominee, military veteran and political commentator Kathy Barnette, with 59.5% of the vote to Barnette's 40.5%.

==== 2022 ====
Dean stood for re-election in 2022, but her district was mostly unchanged by redistricting. Dean faced Republican nominee Christian Nascimento, a vice president of product at Comcast and former Methacton School Board president, and won 61.3% of the vote.

=== Tenure ===
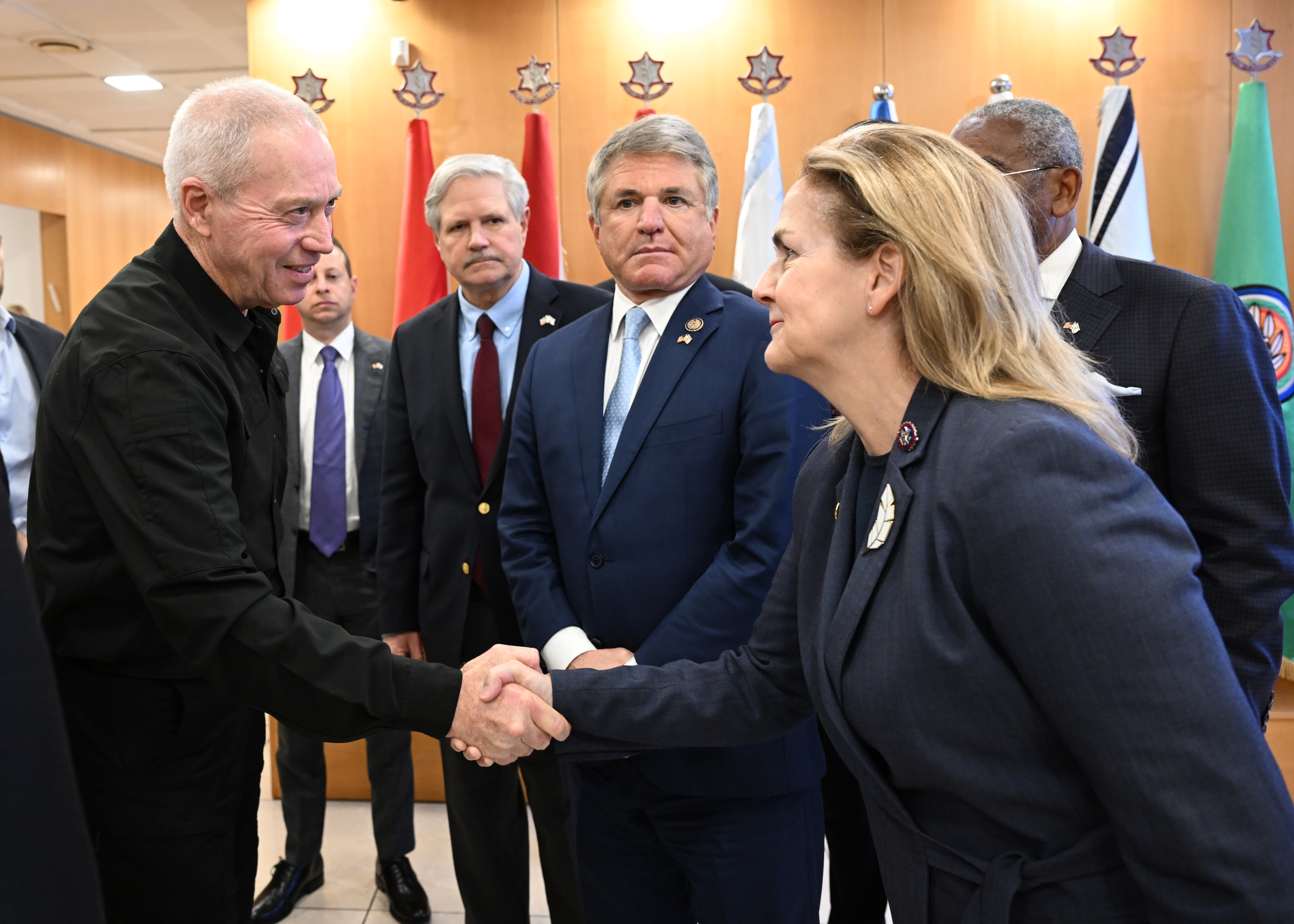
Dean with Israeli defense minister Yoav Galant in Israel, November 12, 2023

On January 12, 2021, Dean was named an impeachment manager (prosecutor) for the second impeachment trial of Donald Trump.

On July 29, 2024, Dean was announced as one of six Democratic members of a bipartisan task force investigating the attempted assassination of Donald Trump in Pennsylvania.

=== Committee, subcommittee and task force assignments ===
- House Appropriations Committee

- Commerce, Justice, and Science Subcommittee
- Labor, Health and Human Services, and Education Subcomittee

- House Committee on Foreign Affairs

- Oversight and Intelligence Subcommittee
- Foreign Arms Sales Task Force – Ranking Member

=== Caucus memberships ===
- Bipartisan Fentanyl Prevention Caucus - Chair
- Addiction, Treatment, and Recovery Caucus - Vice Chair
- Bipartisan Addiction and Mental Health Task Force
- Gun Violence Prevention Task Force
- Bipartisan Women's Caucus
- New Democrat Coalition
- Congressional Progressive Caucus
- Congressional Equality Caucus
- Congressional Ukraine Caucus

== Political positions ==
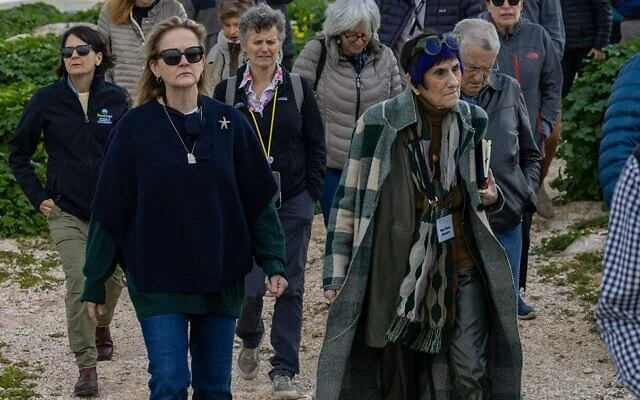
A delegation of U.S. House Democrats tour the West Bank village of Khirbet Zanutah, 2024

Dean voted to provide Israel with support following 2023 Hamas attack on Israel. Her position shifted in July 2026, when she voted for an amendment to end military aid to Israel, stating that "[n]ot another dime [should go] to the Netanyahu government." She is also a cosponsor of the Block the Bombs Act, which would end offensive military aid to Israel.

Since February 28, 2024, Dean has called for a bilateral ceasefire in Gaza, stating "we must all rally behind an end to the violence and heartbreak

Dean voted with President Joe Biden's stated position 100% of the time in the 117th Congress, according to a FiveThirtyEight analysis.

== Electoral history ==
Pennsylvania House of Representatives, 2012 special election 153rd legislative district
Party	Candidate	Votes	%
Democratic	Madeleine Dean	5,206	56.49
Republican	Nicholas Mattiacci	4,009	43.51
Total votes		9,215	100.00
Democratic hold			

Pennsylvania House of Representatives 2012 election 153rd legislative district
Party	Candidate	Votes	%
Democratic	Madeleine Dean (incumbent)	20,934	64.17
Republican	Nicholas Mattiacci	11,369	34.85
Libertarian	Kenneth Krawchuk	320	0.98
Total votes		32,623	100.00
Democratic hold			

Pennsylvania House of Representatives 2014 election 153rd legislative district
Party	Candidate	Votes	%
Democratic	Madeleine Dean (incumbent)	Unopposed	
Total votes		16,984	100.00
Democratic hold			

Pennsylvania House of Representatives 2016 election 153rd legislative district
Party	Candidate	Votes	%
Democratic	Madeleine Dean (incumbent)	24,496	66.25
Republican	Anthony Scalfaro III	12,478	33.75
Total votes		36,974	100.00
Democratic hold			

Pennsylvania's 4th congressional district, 2018 Democratic primary results
Party	Candidate	Votes	%
Democratic	Madeleine Dean	42,625	72.6
Democratic	Shira Goodman	9,645	16.4
Democratic	Joe Hoeffel	6,431	11.0
Total votes		58,701	100.0

Pennsylvania's 4th congressional district, 2018
Party	Candidate	Votes	%
Democratic	Madeleine Dean	211,524	63.5
Republican	Dan David	121,467	36.5
Total votes		332,991	100.0
Democratic hold			

Pennsylvania's 4th congressional district, 2020
Party	Candidate	Votes	%
Democratic	Madeleine Dean (incumbent)	264,637	59.5
Republican	Kathy Barnette	179,926	40.5
Total votes		444,563	100.0
Democratic hold			

2022 Pennsylvania's 4th congressional district election
Party	Candidate	Votes	%
Democratic	Madeleine Dean (incumbent)	224,799	61.3
Republican	Christian Nascimento	141,986	38.7
Total votes		366,785	100.0
Democratic hold			

2024 Pennsylvania's 4th congressional district election
Party	Candidate	Votes	%
Democratic	Madeleine Dean (incumbent)	269,066	59.1
Republican	David Winkler	186,457	40.9
Total votes		455,523	100.0
Democratic hold			

== Other political campaigns ==
=== Lieutenant governor ===
In November 2017, Dean announced her candidacy for lieutenant governor of Pennsylvania, facing, among others, incumbent Mike Stack in the Democratic primary. She dropped out to run for Congress.

== Personal life ==
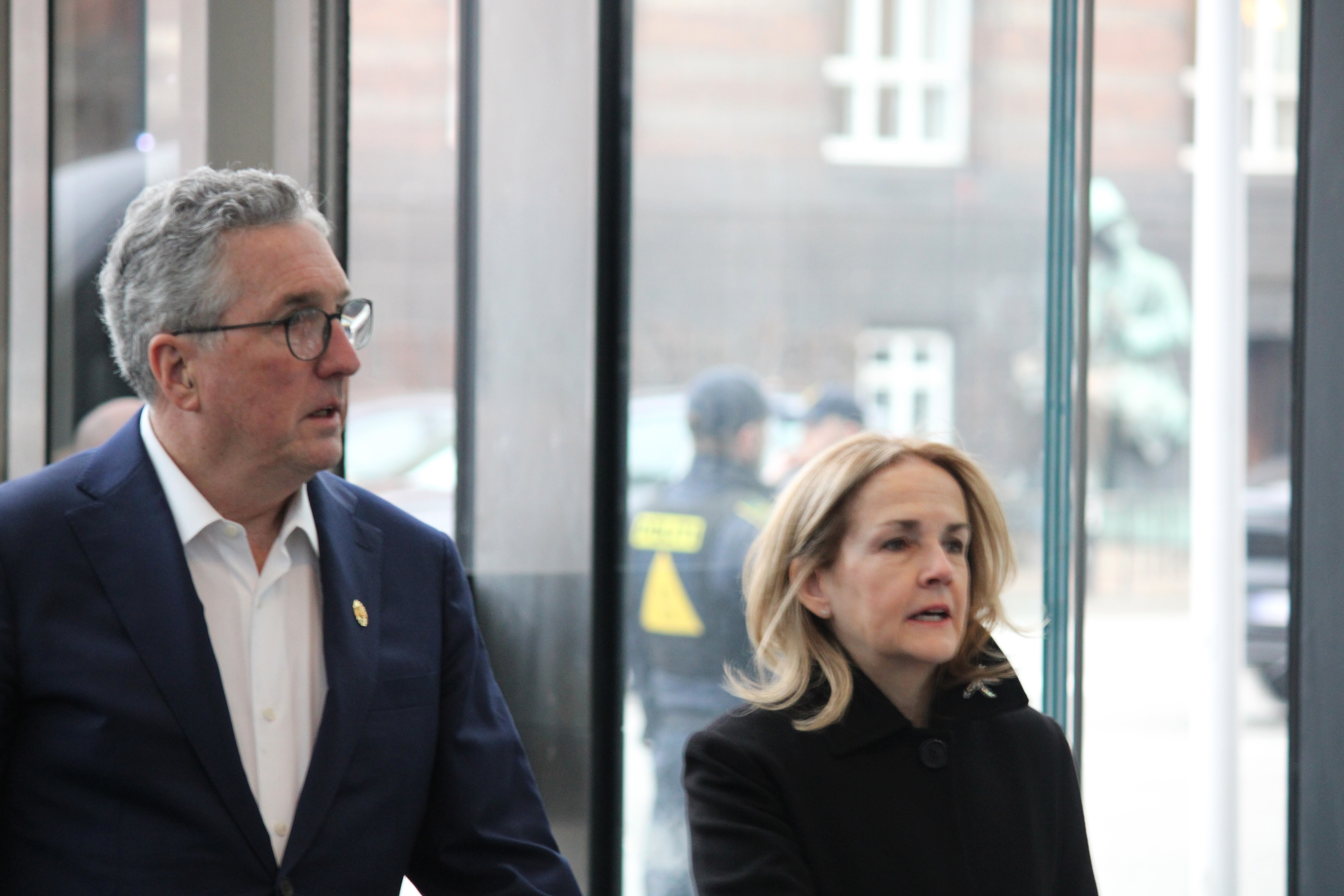
Dean with her husband Patrick Cunnane at Industriens Hus in Copenhagen, Denmark, 2026

Dean lives in Abington Township, with her husband, Patrick "P.J." Cunnane. Cunnane is an entrepreneur in the bicycle industry and managed Advanced Sports International. They have three grown sons and three grandchildren. Her son Pat was senior writer and deputy director of messaging in the Obama administration. Dean is Roman Catholic.

== See also ==
- List of La Salle University people
- Women in the United States House of Representatives

U.S. House of Representatives
Preceded by Scott Perry	Member of the U.S. House of Representatives from Pennsylvania's 4th congressional district 2019–present	Incumbent
Preceded by Brenda Lawrence	Chair of the Congressional Women's Caucus; 2021–2023	Succeeded by Kat Cammack
U.S. order of precedence (ceremonial)
Preceded by Sharice Davids	United States representatives by seniority 197th	Succeeded by Veronica Escobar
