= Head (company) =

Sports equipment and clothing company

Head Sport GmbH
- Type: Gesellschaft mit beschränkter Haftung
- Industry: Sports equipment
- Founded: 1950; 76 years ago in Baltimore, Maryland
- Founder: Howard Head
- Headquarters: Kennelbach, Vorarlberg, Austria
- Key people: Howard Head (founder); Johan Eliasch (CEO)
- Products: Sportswear, equipment, footwear
- Brands: Head; Apeks; Aqualung; Aquasphere; Indigo; Mares; Penn; SSI rEvo; Tyrolia; Zoggs
- Revenue: ▲$375.4 million (2014)
- Net income: ▼$2.8 million (2014)
- Number of employees: 2,499 (2014)
- Parent: Head Austria GmbH; Head N.V. (formerly)
- Subsidiaries: Penn; Mares
- Website: head.com

Head Sport GmbH is an American–Austrian manufacturing company headquartered in Kennelbach. It owns the American tennis racket brand Head. Head GmbH is a group that includes several previously independent companies, including the original "Head Ski Company" (founded in the United States in 1950); Tyrolia, an Austrian ski-equipment manufacturer; and Mares, an Italian manufacturer of diving equipment.

Head currently produces products for skiing, snowboarding, swimming, tennis and other racket sports. Head Ski Company produced one of the first successful metal-wood composite downhill skis, the Head Standard, and one of the first oversized metal tennis rackets.

== History ==
Head Sport GmbH was founded in 1950, in Baltimore, Maryland, by aeronautical engineer Howard Head, after he took a ski trip and was surprised to find his skis were made of wood in an era when metals and plastics were replacing wood in many product designs. Head worked at the Glenn L. Martin Company where they used a form of aluminum and plastic laminate to build the fuselages of aircraft, and he felt the same material would make an ideal ski. By the winter of 1950 they had a design that was durable enough to use and made turning significantly easier.

The Head Standard rapidly grew in sales through the 1950s, until it and other Head designs were capturing over 50% of the US market during the 1960s, making them the leading ski manufacturer in the US and the UK. Head resisted the change to fiberglass construction. In 1967, Howard Head hired Harold Seigle as company president and became the Chairman of the Board and CEO. In 1969 Head sold the company to the AMF, and took up tennis. He later bought a controlling interest in Prince Sports.

Head products

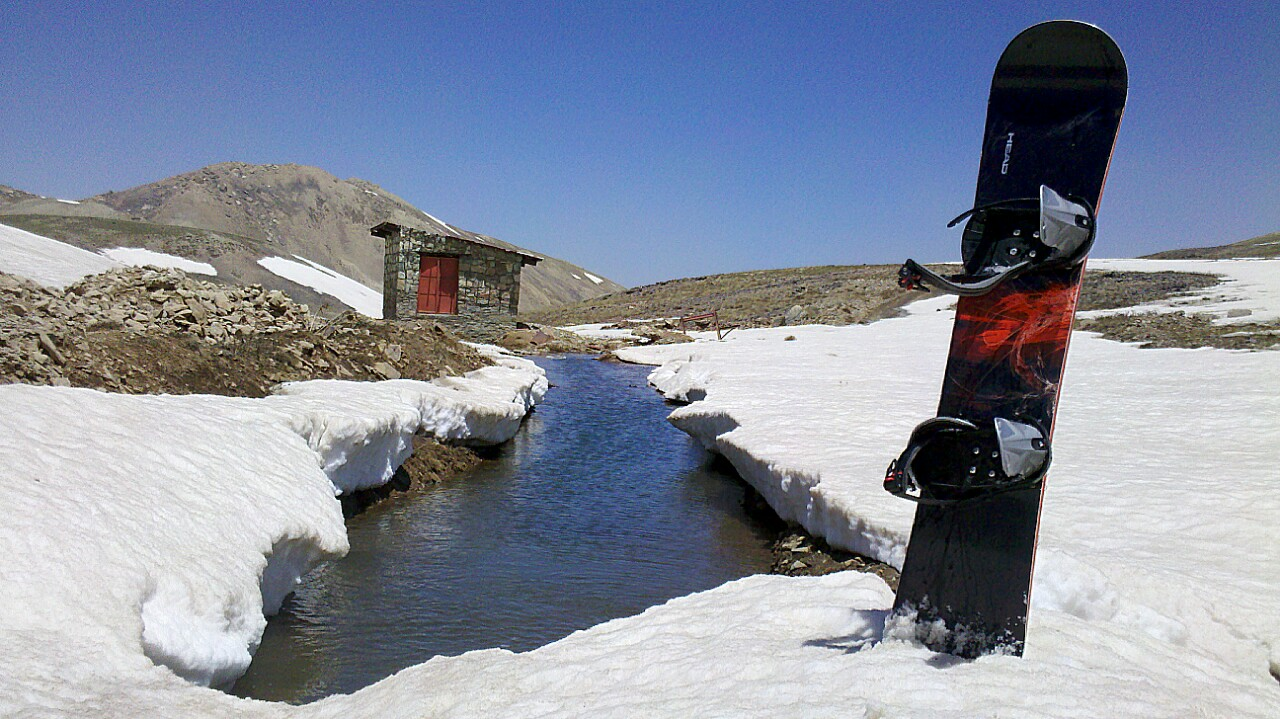
Snowboard

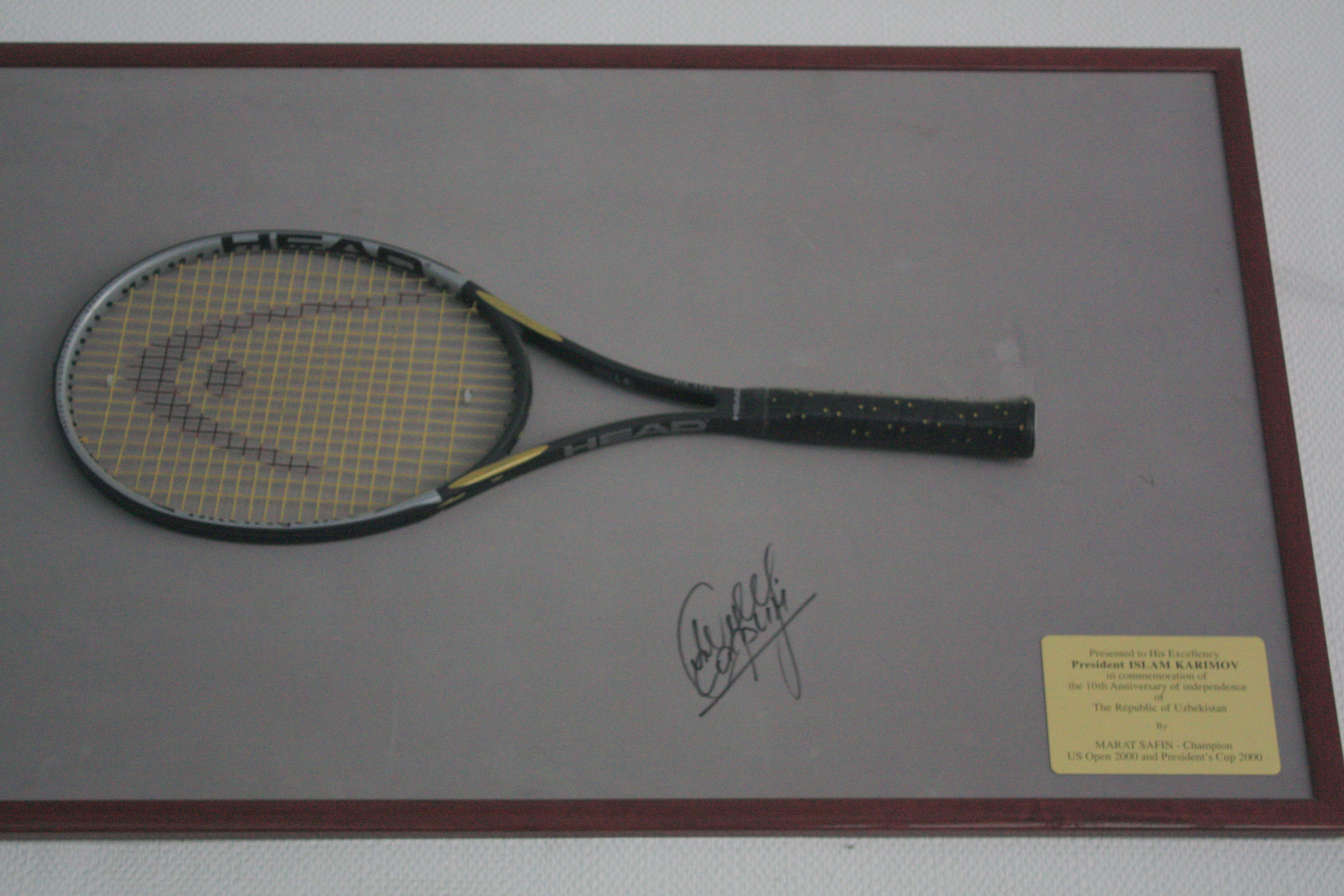
Tennis racket used by Marat Safin

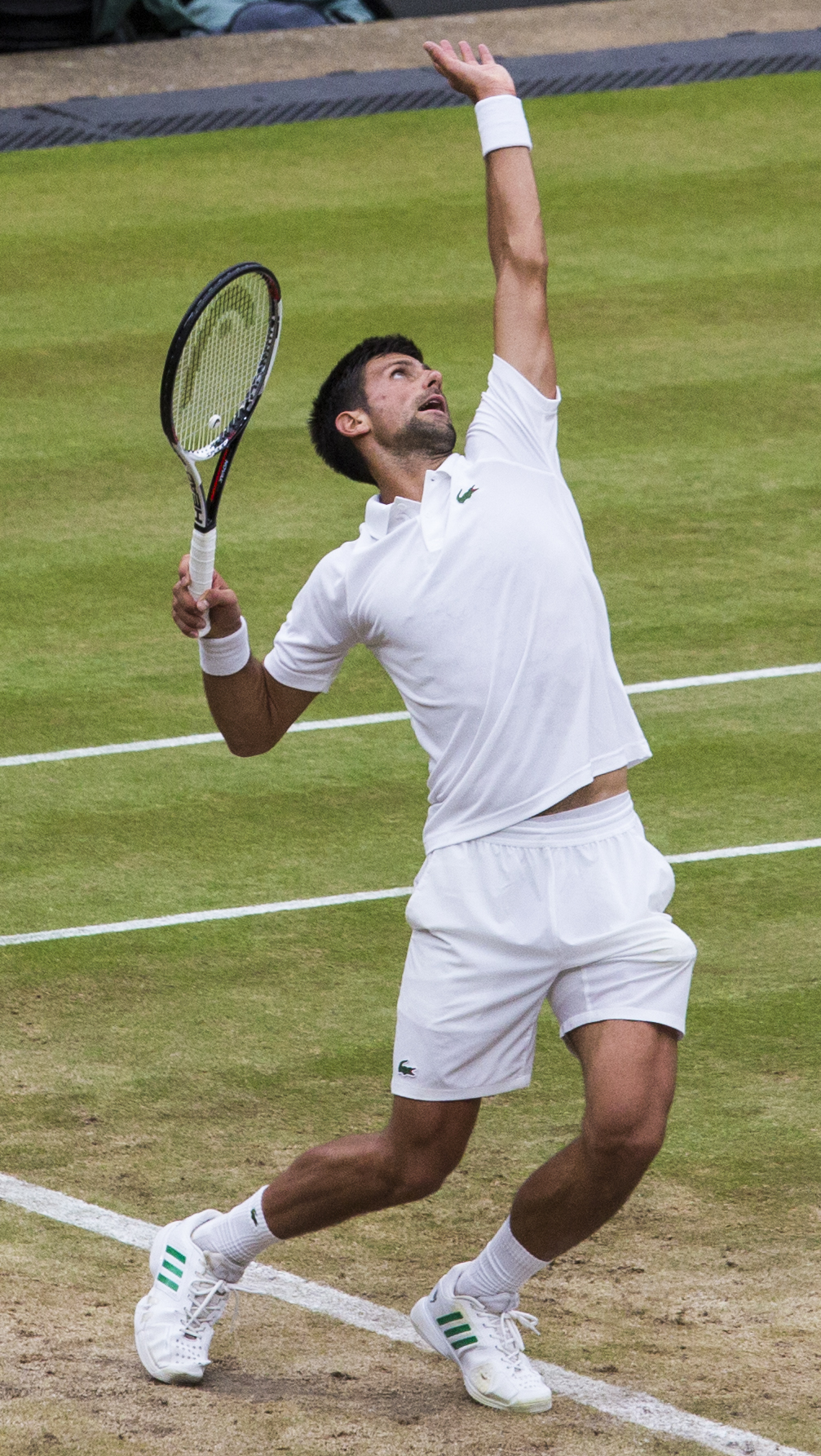
Novak Djokovic used a Head racquet in Wimbledon 2017

In the late 1960s, a tennis division was created when Howard Head figured out a way of strengthening the tennis racket by introducing the aluminium frame. The aluminum frame racket was first introduced in the 1969 US Open. After Howard Head's departure, one of the tennis players that Head sponsored, Arthur Ashe, won Wimbledon, defeating Jimmy Connors in 1975. Also during the 1970s, Head acquired a diving manufacturer, Mares, and a ski binding company, Tyrolia. While under AMF ownership, Head manufactured tennis racquets in Boulder, Colorado, and Kennelbach, Austria. Also in 1969, Head signed Olympic champion ski racer Jean-Claude Killy to endorse a new metal and fiberglass ski, the Killy 800. Head subsequently developed a product line of Killy skis.

In 1985, Minneapolis-based Minstar Inc. acquired Head through hostile takeover of AMF. Two years later, Head started making athletic footwear and introduced the "Radial Tennis Shoes". The following year, Head opened a new plant in Australia to produce more tennis rackets. In 1989, management bought out Head, Tyrolia, and Mares, to form HTM. The takeover was backed by private equity firm Freeman Spogli & Co. In 1993, HTM was sold to tobacco conglomerate Austria Tabak. Johan Eliasch, the current chairman, took over the company in 1995, which in 2014 was a Netherlands Antilles corporation.

Head also licenses its brand to makers of clothing apparel (including shoes), accessories, bicycles, skates, watches, balls, fitness equipment, and drinks.

In 2012, three Major winners won using Head rackets: Novak Djokovic at the Australian Open, Maria Sharapova at the French Open and Andy Murray at the US Open. The success at Grand-slam level continued throughout the 2010s, into the 2020s, with Marin Čilić winning the 2014 US Open using a Head racquet, and Jannik Sinner winning the 2024 Australian Open using a Head Speed.

Head started integrating graphene into their rackets in 2013.

In 2019, Head purchased ASE assets, the owner of Fuji Bikes, Breezer Bikes, SE Bikes, Kestrel Bikes, Tuesday Bikes, PHAT Bikes, Oval, Performance Bicycle Stores and Nashbar. On January 22, 2019, it was reported that Head Sports backed out of the deal to buy ASE.

In June 2025, Head acquired the Aqualung Group following its bankruptcy. With this acquisition, Head became one of the leading players in the global diving industry, bringing together several major brands including Apeks, Aqualung, Aquasphere, Mares, Omer, SSI, and Zoggs. Founded by Jacques-Yves Cousteau, Aqualung is widely regarded as the pioneer of modern scuba diving.

== Sponsorships ==
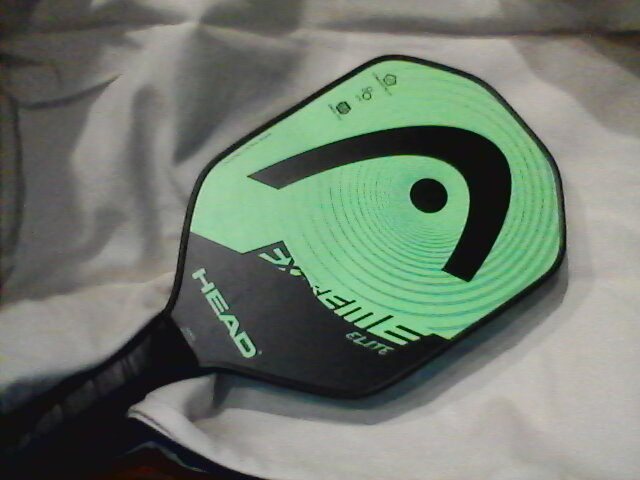
A Pickleball paddle made by Head.

Some of the athletes sponsored by Head are:

- (United States) Andre Agassi
- (United Kingdom) Andy Murray
- (Serbia) Novak Djokovic
- (Italy) Jannik Sinner
- (Italy) Matteo Berrettini
- (Italy) Lorenzo Musetti
- (Italy) Flavio Cobolli
- (United States) Taylor Fritz
- (Germany) Alexander Zverev
- (Czech Republic) Karolína Muchová
- (United States) Coco Gauff
- (United States) Lindsey Vonn
- (Austria) Anna Fenninger
- (Switzerland) Lara Gut
- (Norway) Kjetil Jansrud
- (United States) Ted Ligety
- (France) Alexis Pinturault
- (France) Cyprien Richard
- (Norway) Aksel Lund Svindal
- (India) Ramkumar Ramanathan
- (Brazil) Luisa Stefani

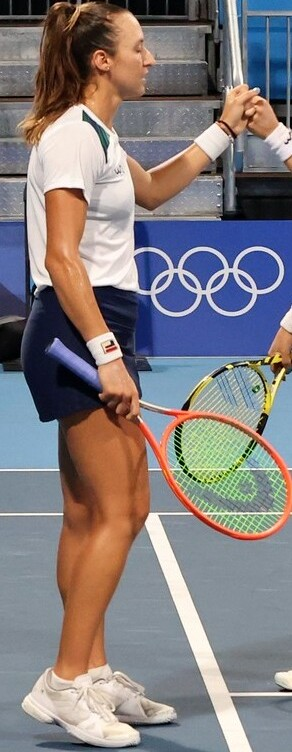
Luisa Stefani used a Head racquet during the Tokyo 2020 Summer Olympics
