= Patrick Cunnane =

American business person

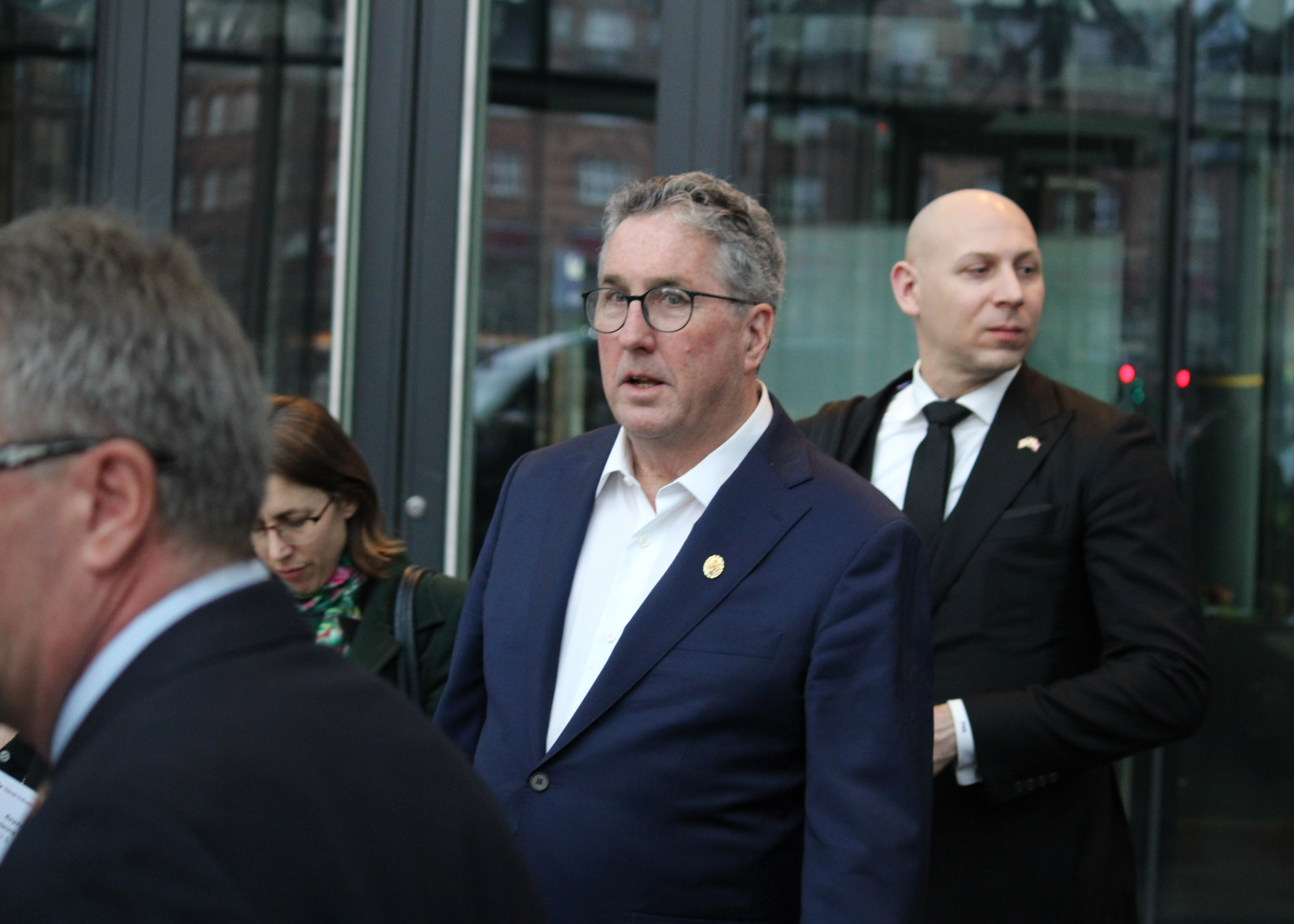
- Cunnane in 2026
- Born: June 26, 1958 (age 68); Philadelphia, Pennsylvania, United States
- Education: Temple University BA History
- Occupation: Business Executive
- Employer: Yuba Bicycles
- Known for: Advanced Sports Enterprises CEO
- Spouse: Madeleine Dean
- Children: 3
- Parents: Bill Cunnane (father); Joan Cunnane (mother)

Patrick "PJ" Cunnane (born June 26, 1958) is a bicycle business executive from Philadelphia, Pennsylvania. Cunnane was the CEO of Advanced Sports International which owned five bicycle brands under the name Advanced Sports International formerly Advanced Sports Enterprises (ASE). He oversaw the distribution of 450 different bicycle models and the acquisition and operation of the largest bicycle retail chain in the United States. He left ASE in 2019 and is now an executive with Yuba Bicycles.

== Early life ==
Cunnane was born in Philadelphia in 1958 to parents Bill and Joan Cunnane. He began working at a bicycle shop when he was 12 years old. He attended Montgomery County Community College and then earned a Bachelor of Arts degree in history from Temple University in 1990.

== Career ==
In 2008, Cunnane, was the president of Advanced Sports, Incorporated. The company managed Fuji Bikes, SE Bikes and BMX Bikes. In 2009, he oversaw the purchase of Oval Concepts which was a parts maker with patented technology. In 2010, Bicycle Retailer and Industry News chose him as its “Executive of the Year”.

In 2015, he added Phat Cycles to the company. In 2016, Cunnane oversaw the acquisition of Performance Bicycle: which was the largest bicycle retail company in America The company was established in 1998 and went on to distribute 450 different bicycles under the brands: Fuji (bicycles), SE Bikes, Kestrel, Breezer and Phat Cycles.

Cunnane went on to manage more bicycle brands as the CEO of Advanced Sports Enterprises which owned the distributor Advanced Sports International until the company was in bankruptcy in 2018. The business faced pressure from Trump administration import tariffs. Eventually there was a cascade of store and plant closures related to the ASE bankruptcy. The company was sold to a Chinese firm called Active Cycles in 2018. Cunnane stayed on through 2019 to assist with the new ownership.

In 2020, Yuba bicycles named Cunnane president of Yuba Bicycles North American operations and COO of its global business. In 2019, Cunnane was a consultant for the company. He now serves on the board of directors for the organization PeopleForBikes.

== Personal life ==
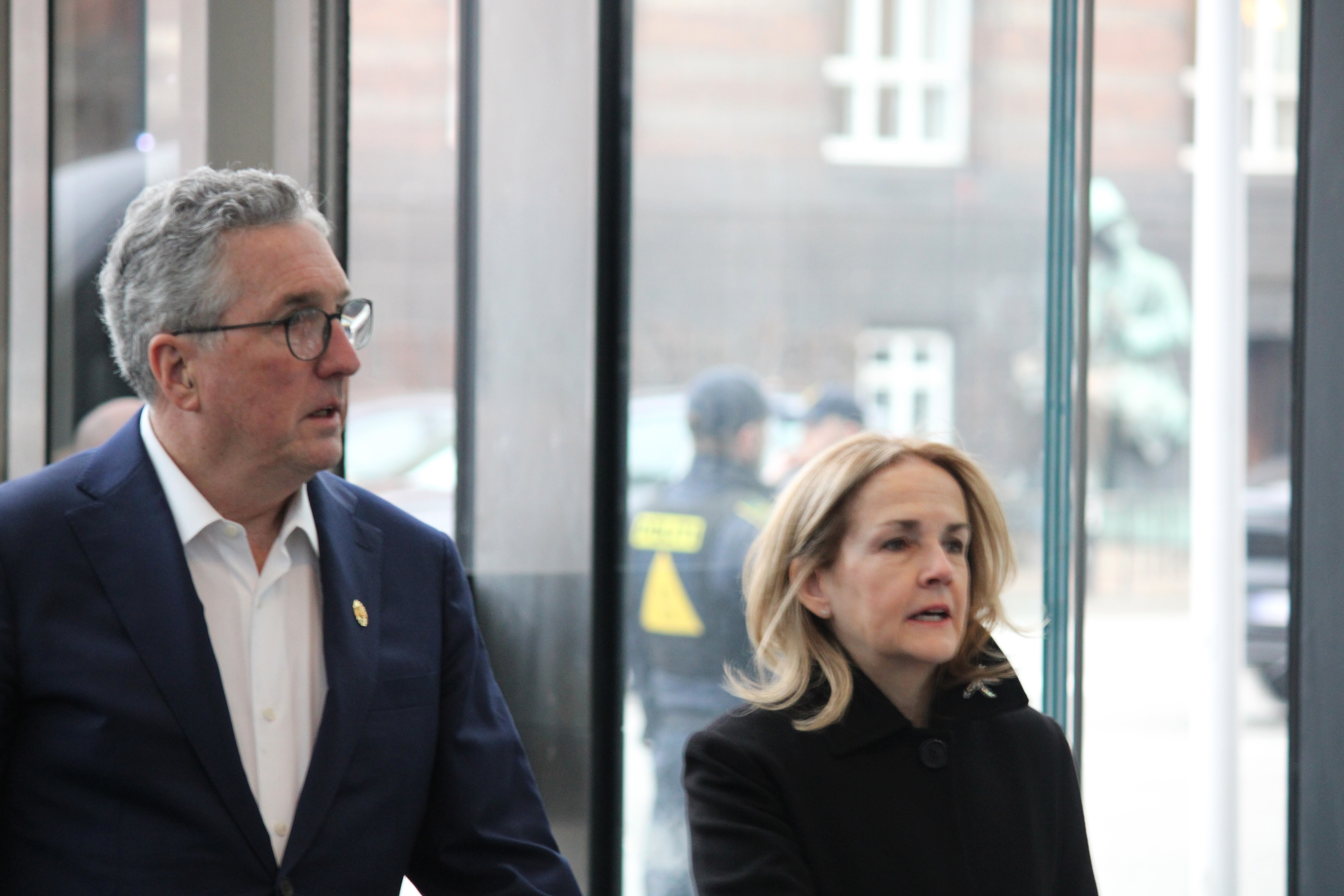
Cunnane with his wife Madeleine Dean at Industriens Hus in Copenhagen, Denmark, 2026

Cunnane's is married to Congresswoman Madeleine Dean. Together they have three sons.
