= Perry Kramer =

American bicycle motocross racer (born 1959)

Personal information
- Full name: Perry Kramer
- Nickname: "P.K."
- Born: October 6, 1959 (age 67) Santa Monica, California, United States

Cycling career
- Sport: Cycling
- Current team: Retired
- Discipline: Bicycle Motocross (BMX)
- Role: racer
- Rider type: Off Road

Amateur teams
- 1974: Dan Gurney
- 1974-1975: Dirtmaster
- 1976: National Bicycle Association (NBA)
- 1976-1977: Mongoose

Professional teams
- 1977-1978: Mongoose
- 1979-1983: SE Racing
- 1983-1984: Race, Inc.
- 1984-1985: SE Racing

Perry Kramer (born October 6, 1959) is a former American "Old School" professional Bicycle Motocross (BMX) racer whose prime competitive years were from 1974-1981.

Among his accomplishments is his co-founding with Scot Breithaupt of Scot Enterprise Racing (SE Racing). His nickname "PK" is a simple derivation from his first and last initials of his name and the inspiration of one of the most popular models of BMX bicycle, the "PK Ripper," that is still in production.

== Racing career milestones ==
Note: In the early days of professional racing, prior to 1976, many tracks offered small purse prize money to the older racers of an event, even before the official sanctioning bodies offered prize money in formal divisions themselves. Hence, some early "professionals" like Stu Thomsen who turned "pro" in 1975 at age 16, would race for small amounts of money at track events when offered. Even before the NBA, this was regarded as the first true national BMX sanctioning body and had a professional division. For the sake of consistency and standardization, noted professional firsts are for the first pro races involving prize money offered by official BMX sanctioning bodies and not independent track events. Professional firsts are also on the national level unless otherwise indicated.

Started Racing: 1973 or 1974. Perry Kramer himself is vague on this point. His first race was at what was the very first BMX track, Palms Park in Los Angeles, California which was started by Ron Mackler in 1969. In the very first issue of Bicycle Motocross News, June 1974, he is listed in the recap section that listed race results as coming in second on April 24, 1974, in 12-14 Jr. Expert in the Palms Park Series in Los Angeles, California.

Sanctioning Body: Independent.

First race result:

First win (local):

Home sanctioning body district(s): National Bicycle Association (NBA) District "N" (Northern California);

First sponsor:

First national win: In the Open Main at the National Bicycle Association (NBA) Winter Nationals in Scottsdale, Arizona on April 17, 1976.

Turned Professional: 1977 age 18.

First Professional* race result:

First Professional** win:

Retired: 1985

Height & weight at height of his career:

*At the time there was no separate pro class for pros due to the relatively small number of pros. They raced with the 16 Experts, making it a Pro/Am class essentially. This is why, during the early years of the pro division, the national number one racer of a sanctioning body could be either an amateur or professional. This practice continued until the NBA's 1979 season, when the pros earned separate pro points and a separate pro plate from the amateurs. The NBL and the ABA followed suit a year later.
**At the start of his pro career, there wasn't a two-tier system of Junior and Senior Pros, therefore his first pro race and/or win was his first in Senior pro.

=== Career factory and major bike shop sponsors ===
Note: This listing only denotes the racer's primary sponsors. At any given time a racer could have numerous co-sponsors. Primary sponsorships can be verified by BMX press coverage and sponsor's advertisements at the time in question; when possible, exact dates are given.

==== Amateur ====
- Dan Gurney: 1974
- Dirt-master: 1974-1975
- National Bicycle Association: January 1976 to Late 1976. He was directly sponsored by the sanctioning body.
- Mongoose (BMX Products): Late 1976-Early February 1978 Kramer would turn pro with this sponsor

==== Professional ====
- Mongoose: Late 1976-Early February 1978
- SE (Scot Enterprises, now Sports Engineering) Racing: Mid-February 1978 - February 1983. Kramer was dropped by SE after the 1983 American Bicycle Association (ABA) Winter Nationals held in Chandler, Arizona.
- Race Inc: March 1983-Mid 1984
- SE Racing: Mid 1984-1985. After Race Inc. went out of business in mid 1984, Kramer rejoined his old sponsor.

=== Career bicycle motocross titles ===
Note: Listed are District, State/Provincial/Department, Regional, National, and International titles in italics. "Defunct" refers to the fact of that sanctioning body in question no longer existing at the start of the racer's career or at that stage of his/her career. Depending on point totals of individual racers, winners of Grand Nationals do not necessarily win National titles. Series and one-off Championships are also listed in block.

==== Amateur ====
- 1975 Arizona State Champion

National Bicycle Association (NBA)

- 1976 Winternationals Open and Overall Champion
- 1976 6 & Over Expert and Overall Western States Champion
- 1976 National No.2 (Pro/Am Title)

National Bicycle League (NBL)

- None

American Bicycle Association (ABA)

- None

International Bicycle Motocross Federation (IBMXF)

- None

==== Professional ====
National Bicycle Association (NBA)

- 1976 National No.2 (Pro/Am Title)
- 1979 Jag Pro World Champion. (NBA/NBL sanctioned)

National Bicycle League (NBL)

- None

American Bicycle Association (ABA)

- None

United States Bicycle Motocross Association (USBA)

- None

International Bicycle Motocross Federation (IBMXF)

- None

Special races, Invitationals and Pro Series Championships

- 1980 Tokyo Grand Prix Champion.
- 1980 Avro Invitational Fietscross Champion held in Eindhoven, Netherlands.

=== Notable accolades ===
- He and friends of his when they were children were responsible for getting Ernie Alexander, a motorcycle motocross track operator, to hold bicycle motocross races. This led Ernie Alexander to eventually create the National Bicycle Association.
- He helped Scot Breithaupt in the establishment of SE Racing in 1977.
- Named number five of the top five riders in Southern California of 1977 by Bicycle Motocross News.
- One of the most respected and pioneering BMX bicycle models is named after him: The P.K. Ripper manufactured by Scot Enterprises (SE) Racing. It was one of the first production BMX bicycles to be made from aluminum. It is a metal that was difficult to work with vis-à-vis bicycle frame construction and fragile if not manufactured correctly. As a result, it was also more expensive than typical steel bicycles. The P.K. Ripper was one of the first aluminum-framed BMX bicycles that was reliable and durable for racing and competitively priced. It was in many ways ahead of its time. The fact that it resembles a modern BMX bicycle is no accident; most modern BMX race bicycles are usually made from aluminum. Like the P.K., modern aluminum bicycle frames have oversized flattened downtubes and toptubes which was called on the Ripper (and a pioneering S.E. Racing BMX Cruiser) "Floval" by the founder of S.E. Racing, Scot Breithaupt. Also, there is a pro cruiser by S.E. called the "floval flyer," a very unusual-looking bicycle at the time, as was the "exotic" material it was fabricated from. When introduced, most BMX bicycles were made from either hi-tensile steel or more expensive but stronger chromium-molybdenum steel. Chromium-molybdenum steel, commonly known as "Chromoly", while more expensive than high-tensile steel, it was cheaper than aluminum, in part it was much easier to fabricate and more reliable in terms of durability than most other aluminum framed race bicycles on the market at the time. Aluminum, while significantly lighter and much less subject to corrosion than chromoly steel, is more brittle and less resilient than chromoly. The frame must be absolutely stiff or it is subject to failing abruptly, i.e. snapping in two suddenly. It will succumb from metal fatigue at a much faster rate, especially if it is subjected to flexing. This is why the tubes of an aluminum frame are both of a larger diameter and are thicker walled than chromoly tubes, to maintain stiffness. Further, aluminum is harder to weld. The welds have to be extra strong and "double butted" and thorough which gives the aluminum frame with its very obvious beaded welds an "unfinished" look, as if someone forgot to sand them down at the factory to give it the clean, almost one-piece look of a chromoly frame. As a result, the weight advantage of aluminum is reduced significantly, in addition to it higher fabrication cost. For these reasons, the Chromoly steel frame and fork was the standard of BMX racing and freestyle for twenty years. Only in the mid-1990s, as manufacturing advances - many pioneered in the construction of a mountain bike frame - made aluminum cheaper and easier to work with, did aluminum-framed race and freestyle bicycles begin to supplant chromoly. Today the aluminum BMX bicycle frame is the standard, and the modern iteration of the P. K. Ripper is still manufactured by SE (now called Sports Engineering) Racing.
- He was one of the founding members of the Professional Racing Organization (PRO) racers guild in 1977.
- Following in the footsteps of Bobby Encinas he established Perry Kramer's Pro School of BMX traveling BMX clinic in 1978 teaching hundreds of kids what BMX had to offer.
- 2001 Kobe Bryant Biggest Fan In the World Award
- He is a 1991 Inductee into the ABA BMX Hall of Fame
- He is a 2004 Inductee into the United States Bicycling Hall of Fame.

== Post BMX career ==
- He stayed within the industry and worked for various bicycle companies including Giant.

== BMX press magazine interviews and articles ==
- "Perry Kramer's Pro BMX Winners Seminar!" BMX Plus! May 1982 Vol. No.5 pg.10
- "Perry Kramer on sponsorships" BMX Torque March/April 1983 Vol.1 No.7 pg.34 Australian publication. It was the last BMX Torque ever published.
- "Flashback: Perry Kramer" Snap BMX Magazine Vol.7 Iss.4 No.42 pg.69 Retrospective article.

== BMX magazine covers ==
Bicycle Motocross News:

- May 1976 Vol.3 No.5 with Tinker Juarez and an unidentified racer.
- January 1977 Vol.4 No.1 (holding trophy) with numerous unidentified.

Minicycle/BMX Action & Super BMX:

- January 1981 Vol.8 No.1 (4) leading unidentified racer (164)
- March 1981 Vol.8 No.3 in top insert head shot Scott Clark in main image.

Bicycle Motocross Action:

- June 1981 Vol.6 No.6 with Scot Breithaupt and R.L. Osborn.

BMX Plus!:

- October 1979 Issue No.8

Bicycles and Dirt (ABA publication):

Total BMX:

NBA World & NBmxA World (The official NBA/NBmxA membership publication under two names):

Bicycles Today & BMX Today (The NBL official membership publication under two names):

ABA Action, American BMXer, BMXer (The ABA official membership publication under three names):

USBA Racer (The USBA official membership publication):
