= Scot Breithaupt =

Entrepreneur and old schools professional motorcycle MX and bicycle motocross racer

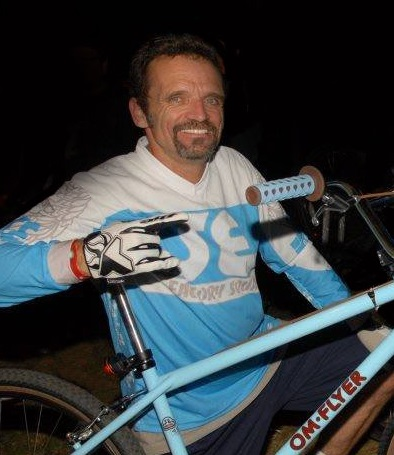

Personal information
- Full name: Scot Alexander Breithaupt
- Nicknames: Old Man, OM
- Born: July 14, 1957 Long Beach, California, U.S.
- Died: July 4, 2015 (aged 57) Indio, California, U.S.
- Height: 1.75 m (5 ft 9 in)
- Weight: 70.3 kg (155 lb)

Cycling career
- Sport: Cycling
- Current team: Retired
- Discipline: Bicycle motocross (BMX)
- Role: Racer/promoter/manufacturer/sponsor
- Rider type: Off-road

Amateur teams
- 1973–1974: Matthews Motocross
- 1975: Matthews Motocross/Yamaha
- 1976: Dan Gurney
- 1977: FMF
- 1977: SE Racing

Professional teams
- 1977–1999: SE Racing
- 2005–2006: SE Racing

Scot Alexander Breithaupt (July 14, 1957 – July 5, 2015) was an entrepreneur, old school professional motorcycle MX and bicycle motocross (BMX) racer. He was the founding father of BMX in 1970. His prime competitive years were 1970 to 1984. Many consider him, in some ways, a founder of "Old School BMX", an era from roughly 1969 to 1987/1988, from its very beginnings to just after its first major slump in popularity from 1985 to 1988.

== Pioneer and entrepreneur ==
Breithaupt was a BMX pioneer, perhaps the inventor of its modern infrastructure. He first organized what was called "Pedal-Cross" on November 14, 1970, establishing a track in a vacant lot in Long Beach, California. He also founded what could be called BMX's first sanctioning body of any kind, the Bicycle United Motocross Society (BUMS).

Breithaupt, who was a teenage MX racer for Yamaha, set up organizational features around his races much as later sanctioning bodies did: rulebooks, a point system, a skill level structure, a racing season, trophies and promotions of special races that were the prototype for nationals. He produced the first California State Championships in 1972.

Breithaupt adapted these structures from motocross sanctioning bodies such as the AMA, CMC and AME, as would other pioneers like Ernie Alexander, founder of the National Bicycle Association (NBA) and George Esser (founder of the National Bicycle LeagueA (NBL), both of whom, like Breithaupt, had roots in motorcycle motocross as racers or promoters. Breithaupt was the first to do it in BMX, at the age of 13.

His nickname OM stood for "Old Man" was in part because he was older at a time when BMX was seen as a pre-teen and early teen activity. By the late 1970s, he did things beyond his young age—promoting races, nationwide tours, teaching racing clinics, safety seminars for the C.P.S.C. and starting and consulting with companies while still a teenager. Later, it became a running gag as to just how old he was. In the January 1975 issue of Cycle Illustrated in its report on the Yamaha Bicycle Gold Cup Finals (a.k.a. the Bicycle Motocross Championship of California State), which Breithaupt conceptualized, promoted, and built a custom track for, has him listed as 17 years old. At 17, his age hadn't become a running gag yet, although he could not participate in the Yamaha Bicycle Gold Cup series finals. Ironically since he was the race promoter he was disqualified after a win in the expert class in the first qualifying race at Birmingham High School in Van Nuys, California, with Brian Ramocinski declared the winner. This was the first of three preceding qualifying races prior to the final to be held in September 1974. Only those 16 years and younger could participate and he had turned 17 between the time he signed up for the race and the day the qualifying race was actually held, July 20, 1974. He turned 17 on July 14, 1974, six days before the race. This makes his birth year 1957, and makes him 13 when he started organizing races in Long Beach in November 1970. In fact nine other riders in the event were over 16. In fact, Ramocinski's sponsor, Dirtmasters, and its general manager Mike Devitt protested Breithaupt. Further confirmation came on page 11 of the November 1975 issue of Bicycle Motocross News, which described Breithaupt as an "18-year-old dynamo."

This running joke is with his complicity. He used to put a "?" mark in the space for the rider's age on the ABA sign-up form for when he raced Cruiser class. Also, in part two of a four-part series of interviews by BMXUltra.com profiling Mr. Breithaupt and SE Racing in response to a question "When did you start SE?" he quips "I started SE Racing in Mid 1977 when I was 14." Of course the joke being, if true he helped invent BMX in 1970 when he was seven years old.

Young Breithaupt did not just tend to his own track. He designed the Saddleback Park B.M.X. Track in Orange County, California, Westminster BMX, City of Walnut BMX, Signall Hill BMX, Escape Country, and also collaborated with the municipal government of La Palma, California, to design the La Palma Youth Village BMX track, and also Fountain Valley Boys and Girls Club Track. Significant accomplishments for a teenager by any standard. In later years, Breithaupt designed and built Narler Park in Long Beach, California, the first track with a separate pro section. It was also the site of the last ever National Bicycle Association (NBA) Grandnationals in December 1982. It was a story in Popular Mechanics in 1974 by Mike Anson, headlined, "Promotional Genius at 16."

In his early years, Breithaupt promoted a bevy of races, both independent and in conjunction with the nascent NBA. He was brought on as their National Public Relations Director in 1975 and announced many of their major events, including the 1975 Shimano Grandnationals, which he sat out due to injuries. He also produced and promoted the very first Pro BMX @ Saddleback Park in 1975.

Breithaupt had a hand in virtually every aspect of BMX: racing, promoting, announcing, designing tracks, manufacturing, sponsoring and managing teams. He even had a hand in founding and/or guiding the existence of the founding four BMX publications; Bicycle Motocross News where he wrote some of the first articles and was the first racer interviewed by a nation spanning BMX publication. He was a contributing writer and staff product tester on Minicylce/BMX Action,** later known as Super BMX, when it began to transition from combined minicycle and BMX racing coverage to BMX only reporting.

He was one of the first staff writers with Bicycle Motocross Action, having a monthly editorial article, and co-founded BMX Plus! with Jim Stevens. After he gave up racing to devote more time to his company, SE Racing, he made it to be one of the more innovative organizations in the niche industry of BMX. At least two products bicycle frames conceived in the mid-1970s survive on the market today in modernized form: The Quadangle and the P.K. Ripper the former known for its highly distinctive configuration the other for being the first truly successful aluminum bicycle frame. They are sold by SE Racing-now known as Sports Engineering Racing-to this day, long after many beloved but now obsolete 1970s and 1980s era frames have become beloved museum pieces. Over this was a persistent dark cloud over Breithaupt; that of drug abuse, that had been with him since the 1980s and tied to the untimely loss of his father. It has resulted in his incarceration on three different occasions although he was in his 5th year of recovery as of April 2010. He started the first large wheel (26-inch) Cruiser Classes with the sanctioning bodies, attracting more adults to the sport. He even set bicycle long distance jump (assisted by being towed by a motorcycle) records. He had a hand in starting the first attempt of a racer's Professional Guild in 1976. The list goes on. His being one of the organized sport's first champions (NBA National Champion in 1976) is almost a footnote. Many of the sport's early stars can trace their career beginnings to Breithaupt's Long Beach B.U.M.S. course.

In 1978 at the track in Carson, California, called the Runway because it was next to the skateboard park, Breithaupt ran NBS-sanctioned races. He did all the work—from promoting to setting up the track to recording results. He held the first Pro race at the Runway sanctioned by the NBA, which Harry Leary won, riding for factory JMC. The first National held at Saddleback in 1979 was won by Stompin' Stu Thomsen fresh on the SE Racing team.

On July 4, 2015, he was found dead at age 57 in a vacant lot in Indio, CA. He was a drug addict, primarily cocaine, who started in his early 20s and aside from brief periods of sobriety he never stopped. His addiction had led him to homelessness, and he was found in 106 degree (F) heat in a makeshift tent.

As an entrepreneur Breithaupt ventured into many industries, creating over 25 entities. Most were "sports related" and involved Breithaupt's passions. Besides being "the founding father of BMX" he is considered a pioneer in promoting, marketing and televising extreme sports such as BMX, skateboarding, karting, mixed martial arts, snowboarding, mountain biking and extreme sports.

Breithaupt's 400+ TV shows, commercials and videos included:

- 1st TV production of BMX racing distributed internationally; 1987 IBMXF World Championships from Orlando, Fl. thru Prime International, HNK, STAR, TSN, BSN, and on Nickelodeon in the U.S. and others through Breithaupt's cable syndication of over 60 million homes.
- 1st Mountain Bike TV program; 1988 SWATCH World Championships from Mammoth Mountain Resort, distributed through ESPN and international networks.
- 1st BMX Freestyle TV show with ESPN and international distribution; The 1987 AFA SOCKO Finals.
- 1st to televise the ABA Grand Nationals for ESPN and distribute internationally 1987–1992.
- 1st to televise snowboarding; 1988 SIMS/Vision Street Wear – Snowdaze.
- 1st to televise skateboarding; 1987 ESPN/Vision Street WEAR-ROCK –N-ROLL JAM, then broadcast through international networks
- 1st to televise GPV and Luge racing; 1987 GPV RAMP JAM on ESPN, PRIME SPORTS, International distribution.

Other shows and TV series include:

- Action Cycle Sports Series – ESPN −1988–1990
- Nickelodeon Special Delivery 1987–1990
- Kids Sports – TSN Canada, Prime Sports, Prime International -STAR – 1990–1992
- Action Karting – PRIME/FOX SPORTS 1992–1993
- Boxing at Tony Longval’s Country Club 1991
- Bob Hope Chrysler Classic Golf Digest 1992–1993
- History of Martial Arts – Showtime – 1993
- Adrenaline High – Nickelodeon, ESPN and international – 1991
- Guinness World Book of Records Day (BMX, freestyle and skateboarding world records) – NBC worldwide – 1989
- World Martial Arts Challenge – UNLV, Showtime, Pay-per-view, B-Rolls, Pre-show, commercials – 1993
- Video catalogues for GT Bicycles, Mongoose, SE Racing, Diamond Back, Schwinn, Ironhorse, Tioga, ATI, Finishline Lubes and others
- IHBA Drag Boat Series – ESPN – 1991–1992
- Vintage Grand Prix Series – ESPN – 1992–1993

=== List of firsts ===
- 1970: First sanctioning body with rules, points system, classifications and championship events
- 1971: Promoted first California State Championships
- Promoted and conducted first official-paid BMX racing schools
- 1972: First California State Champion in 16-over Expert Class
- 1973: Promoted first 100% trophy race
- First rider featured on a P.O.P. display in all Sears and Montgomery Ward stores for Matthews Motocross
- First featured rider in national news, Parade Magazine and CycleNews
- Built and created first municipal BMX track for cities of LaPalma, Cerritos & Westminster, CA
- 1974: Promoted, conceptualized, created, designed and laid out coursed for the Yamaha Bicycle Gold Cup series with finals at LA Colesium
- Won expert class at first event of the Yamaha Bicycle Gold Cup Series on July 20 at Birmingham High School
- First featured rider in premier issue of Bicycle Motocross News
- Created first BMX trophy figurine used for awards, derived from pictures of the OM on a motobike. Worked with Majestic Trophy in Ontario, CA
- First rider and BMX promoter featured in an international magazine (Popular Mechanics)
- 1975: Promoted, conceptualized, designed, laid out courses for the Yamaha Bicycle Gold Cup II, where there were six events over two days. ALA ISDT format – trials, obstacle course, drags, hill climb, BMX race, downhill and cross country time clock
- First BMX rider on cover of Shimano World Magazine
- Promoted, staged and announced first BMX pro race at Saddleback Park with a $200 purse
- Announced first NBA Grand Nationals at Randall Ranch, sponsored by Shimano
- First Nike-sponsored BMX rider
- 1976: First to use tubing shape in alloy frames Foiler teardrop designed for Cycle Pro
- First NBA Sidehack National Champion with Jeff Utterback
- Created first full BMX uniform, with coordinated helmet, jersey, pants and shoes
- First editor of BMX Action magazine and creator of Scotomania
- Created and conducted first national tour of racing clinics, safety seminars and racing NBA & NBL Nationals
- 1978: Created first professional racing organization (P.R.O.)
- Co-Founded BMX Plus magazine
- Created Cruiser Class, getting NBA, ABA and NBL to recognize and expand racing to include larger bikes with classes for kids through adults

*The BMX Plus! 1988 Calendar has it allegedly happening on October 23, 1974
**This publication is not to be confused with BMX Action, which began publishing in late 1976

== Racing career milestones ==
Note: In the early days of professional racing, 1976 and prior, many tracks offered small purse prize money to the older racers of an event, even before the official sanctioning bodies offered prize money in formal divisions themselves. Hence, some early "professionals" like Stu Thomsen turning "pro" in 1975 at 16 years old—racing for small amounts of money at track events. This was before the NBA, considered the first true national BMX sanctioning body, had a professional division. For the sake of consistency and standardization noted professional first are for the first pro races for prize money offered by official BMX sanctioning bodies and not independent track events. Professional first are also on the national level unless otherwise indicated.

Started racing: November 14, 1970, when he was 13 years old at an old field called BUMS that became his first track. It was retroactively named Bicycle United Motocross Society (B.U.M.S). It was in Long Beach, California, on the corner of 7th and Bellflower streets.

Sanctioning body: None. Started the B.U.M.S proto sanctioning body.

Home Sanctioning body district(s): American Bicycle Association (ABA) California District 22 (CA-22) (1980–1985)

- First race result: 1st Place
- First win (local): B.U.M.S. BMX
- First sponsor: Trickray (for BMX) Yamaha (for motorcycles)
- First national win: Yamaha Bicycle Gold Cup series "proto national" on July 20, 1974, at Birmingham High School in Van Nuys, California, but he was disqualified for being over aged at 17 years old. No one over 16 years old was allowed to race despite him actually signing up to race prior to his 17th birthday. This helped established the "Old Man" moniker. His first true national win was in both Open class and in Sidehack class with Jeff Utterback at the National Bicycle Association (NBA) Shawnee Nationals in Shawnee, Oklahoma, on July 17, 1976, doubling.
- Turned professional: 1975
- First Professional win: 1975
- Retired: From 20" racing on May 15, 1977, at the Two Wheeler's/RC Cola Race of Champions national to devote more time to his business and promotional career and his associate editorship at Bicycle Motocross Magazine among other commitments, all of which infringed on his racing career. He then started racing a 26-inch Beach Cruiser beginning in 1979. Due largely to the lack of training time incurred because of his responsibilities of running a company and his promotions, he retired altogether from pro racing in May 1983. He himself reclassified an amateur in the ABA's 22–30 and NBL's 25–35 Cruiser Classes. It was joked in the August 1983 issue of BMX Action that they could start figuring out his age by the cruiser class he raced. He raced intermittently in these older amateur cruiser classes in between commitments with his business. He raced in Vet and Hall of Fame races in his spare time. In May 2005 it was announced that Briepthaupt, then at 49 years of age (approximately), would race for SE Bikes (see below in Factory sponsors, professional, SE Bikes).

Approximate height and weight at the height of his career (1974–1978): Height: 5'10; Weight: 175 lbs.

=== Career factory and major bike shop sponsors ===
Note: This listing only denotes the racer's primary sponsors. At any given time a racer could have numerous co-sponsors. Primary sponsorships can be verified by BMX press coverage and sponsor's advertisements at the time in question. When possible exact dates are given.

==== Amateur ====
- Matthews Motocross Products (a division of Leisure Recreation Vehicles (LRV)):
- 1973 – 1974
- Matthews Motocross/Yamaha International:* Early 1974 – December 1974 He consulted with Yamaha to create and refine their famous Moto-bike, a BMX bicycle that was designed to mimic the look and feel of a motocross motorcycle, including having shock absorbers built into its frame and fork. It is a famous milestone in BMX with early BMX stars like David Clinton winning the first BMX titles on it but it with its energy robbing shock absorbers was not the future that the BMX bicycle would take.
- Dan Gurney All American BMX Bicycles/Bell Helmets:
- January 1975 –
- FMF (Flying Machine Factory):
- Early 1976 – December 1976 (Partner w/Tony Rogers & Donnie Emler)

- He was employed with these companies as consultant, team manager official tester as well as a racer.

- SE (formerly Scot Enterprises, now called Sports Engineering, Inc.)
- Racing: January 1977 – 1999. Breithaupt turned professional with this company, which he founded.

==== Professional ====
- SE (formerly Scot Enterprises, now called Sports Engineering, Inc.) Racing: January 1977 – November 1999. Scot Enterprises, Breithaupt founded and owned this company as an advertising and promotional organization. It expanded into Scot Enterprises Racing Division, which made and sold stickers, T-shirts, and hats. In 1978 it produced its first BMX component the JU-6 frame (JU stood for Jeff Utterback, a top racer at the time, the six referred to his status as the number six rider in the country in the National Bicycle Association (NBA) after the 1977 season). Breithaupt's friend Mike Devitt, took over SE Racing in the late 1980s. After a failed bid to buy out foreign investors, Breithaupt and Devitt lost control of SE Racing's trademarks, and control of the company passed to the foreign investors on October 15, 1999. Devitt and Breithaupt left SE Racing as a result. Later, with Gary Turner (co-founder of GT Racing, later called GT Bicycles), they founded Alliant Bicycles. after Breithaupt and Devitt left the company, a Taiwanese firm acquired SE Racing, but it lay dormant for several years, not making or selling any bikes. Sports Engineering is now owned by Advanced Sports International, which bought SE in August 2002.
- SE Bikes (Sports Engineering Bikes, formerly Scot Enterprises Racing Division): 2005–2006 Showing that BMXers never really retire, on May 15, 2005, Breithaupt announced he had signed a contract to race for SE Racing the old company he had founded but left in 1999, in the BMX cruiser class. At an approximate age of 50 in 2006 this would mean he would race in the 46–51 Cruiser class in the American Bicycle Association (ABA) and 50–54 Cruiser class in the National Bicycle League (NBL).

=== Career bicycle motocross titles ===
Note: Listed are District, State/Provincial/Department, regional, national, and international titles in italics. "Defunct" refers to that sanctioning body in question no longer existing at the start of the racer's career or at that stage of his or her career. Depending on point totals of individual racers, winners of Grand Nationals do not necessarily win National titles. Series and one off Championships are also listed in block.

==== Amateur ====
Bicycle United Motocross Society (B.U.M.S)

- 1972 California State Championship.

National Bicycle Association (NBA)

- 1976 Open Grandnational Champion.
- 1976 National No.1

National Bicycle League (NBL)

- 1980 16 Expert Grandnational Champion

American Bicycle Association (ABA)

- None

United States Bicycle Motocross Association (USBA)

- None

International Bicycle Motocross Federation (IBMXF)

- None

Pro Series Championships

==== Professional ====
National Bicycle Association (NBA)

- 1980 Pro Cruiser National No.3. Jeff Kosmala was Pro Cruiser No. 1 in 1980.

National Bicycle League (NBL)

- None

American Bicycle Association (ABA)

- None

United States Bicycle Motocross Association (USBA)

- None

International Bicycle Motocross Federation (IBMXF)

- None

Pro Series Championships

== Notable accolades ==
- He co-founded BMX Plus! magazine and was contributing editor to both Bicycle Motocross Action and Minicycle/BMX Action (not to be confused with Bicycle Motocross Action, which later condensed its name to BMX Action), which subsequently became Super BMX. Therefore, he had a large hand in all three major founding BMX magazine periodicals.
- He put on the first event that could be called a pro-class race anywhere in 1975 at Saddleback Park in Orange, California (US$200 purse).
- He was a founding member and President of the Professional Racing Organization (PRO), the first attempt to form a BMX professional racers guild.
- He both invented the modern BMX racing Cruiser and the Cruiser class to race them with. In September 1978, Breithaupt appeared at the famous Corona Raceway, in Corona, California, on a converted Emory beach cruiser. It had 26-inch-diameter (660 mm) wheels and low rise handlebars from a motorcycle. That same year he convinced the National Bicycle Association (NBA) to start the Cruiser class.
- He also invented the inverted BMX racing bicycle stem (also known as a "gooseneck"). Unlike the standard "quill gooseneck" stem, BMX bicycles in need of a stem with a much tighter clamping force on the bars to eliminate movement forward or back. That could be caused by the more violent physical abuse racers put upon it like pulling with maximum force during racing and jumping their bicycles, these stems were four-point block clamps secured with Allen bolts, unlike the single point quill gooseneck that had a single "pinchbolt" configuration to clamp the bars. Most other stems of this type, like the standard gooseneck, raised the bottom level of the handlebars up, the inverted stem dropped them down. Breithaupt was heading to an NBA National in Las Vegas, Nevada, in 1979 to race cruiser class a new division in BMX that at the time was made up of BMX bicycles (during this time most were converted Beach Cruisers with 26" diameter wheels, built for the larger rider as opposed the standard 20" vehicle). As he was fitting his handle bars onto the stem of the bicycle he noticed that it was to high for his liking and presumably it couldn't be lowered far enough down to get the feel and leverage he desired. he then removed the clamp the part that actually held fast to the handlebars, from the stem, that was inserted into the head tube and into the fork's neck. He flipped it over and reattached it. He was able then to drop the bottom of the bars another few millimeters to his liking. He later won his Cruiser class at this national using that configuration. He would then persuade "Tuff Neck", a leading manufacturer of BMX bicycle parts at the time, to mass-produce the new component.
- Held the long distance jump record for bicycles in 1979 at an average 76 feet.* He accomplished it on a SE OM Flyer 26" Cruiser. The record held for 10 years.
- He won the very first Pro Cruiser Main of the first Pro Cruiser class in BMX history at the ABA Northwest National in Seattle, Washington, on January 18, 1981, defeating Tim Lillethorupt and Jess Goymon who came in second and third respectively.
- In 1990, Breithaupt was inducted into the ABA BMX Hall of Fame.

*The third and last jump for the average was only 58 feet, so the average was brought down and therefore the previous two jumps were significantly longer than 76 feet.

=== Significant injuries ===
- Broke ankle in November 1974 during photograph session for a book. Was thought never to be able to race again. He was laid up until March 1975.

=== Miscellaneous ===
- His pants motto* was: "C-YA"

*Riders often put slogans on the seat of their pants instead of their surname or nickname as a small psychological ploy against their competitors behind them to read.

== Post-BMX career ==
After a failed bid to buy out foreign investors, Breithaupt and Mike Devitt lost control of SE Racing trademarks and the control of the company passed to the foreign investors in 1999. Breithaupt was in the promotional and real estate business, but he remained with BMX on a casual basis, including racing. In 2005, Breithaupt raced for SE Racing, now called SE Bikes, in the amateur cruiser classes.

Breithaupt was found dead in a tent in a vacant lot in Indio, California, on July 4, 2015.

== Press ==
=== Interviews ===
- "Interview with Scot Breithaupt" Bicycle Motocross News June 1974 Vol. 1 No. 1 pg. 7
- "Scott Breithaupt" Bicycle Motocross News August 1974 Vol. 1 No. 3 pg. 18 article in which Breithaupt gives racing pointers.
- "Talkin' Twenty-Fours" BMX Action May 1982 Vol. 7 No. 5 pg. 53 side bar
- "The Origins of BMX" Super BMX March 1984 Vol. 11 No. 3 pg. 60
- "The Origins of BMX" (part II) Super BMX April 1984 Vol. 11 No. 4 pg. 27

=== Front covers ===
Breithaupt appeared on the following front covers:

- ABA Action
- American BMXer
- Bicycle Motocross Action
- Bicycle Motocross News (July 1974)
- Bicycles and Dirt
- Bicycles Today
- BMXer
- BMX Plus! (May 1980)
- BMX Today
- Minicycle/BMX Action
- NBA World
- NBmxA World
- Super BMX
- Total BMX
- USBA Racer
