= Yuba Bicycles =

Cargo bicycle manufacturer

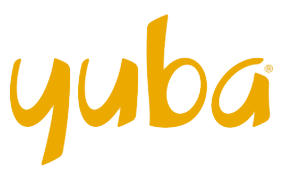

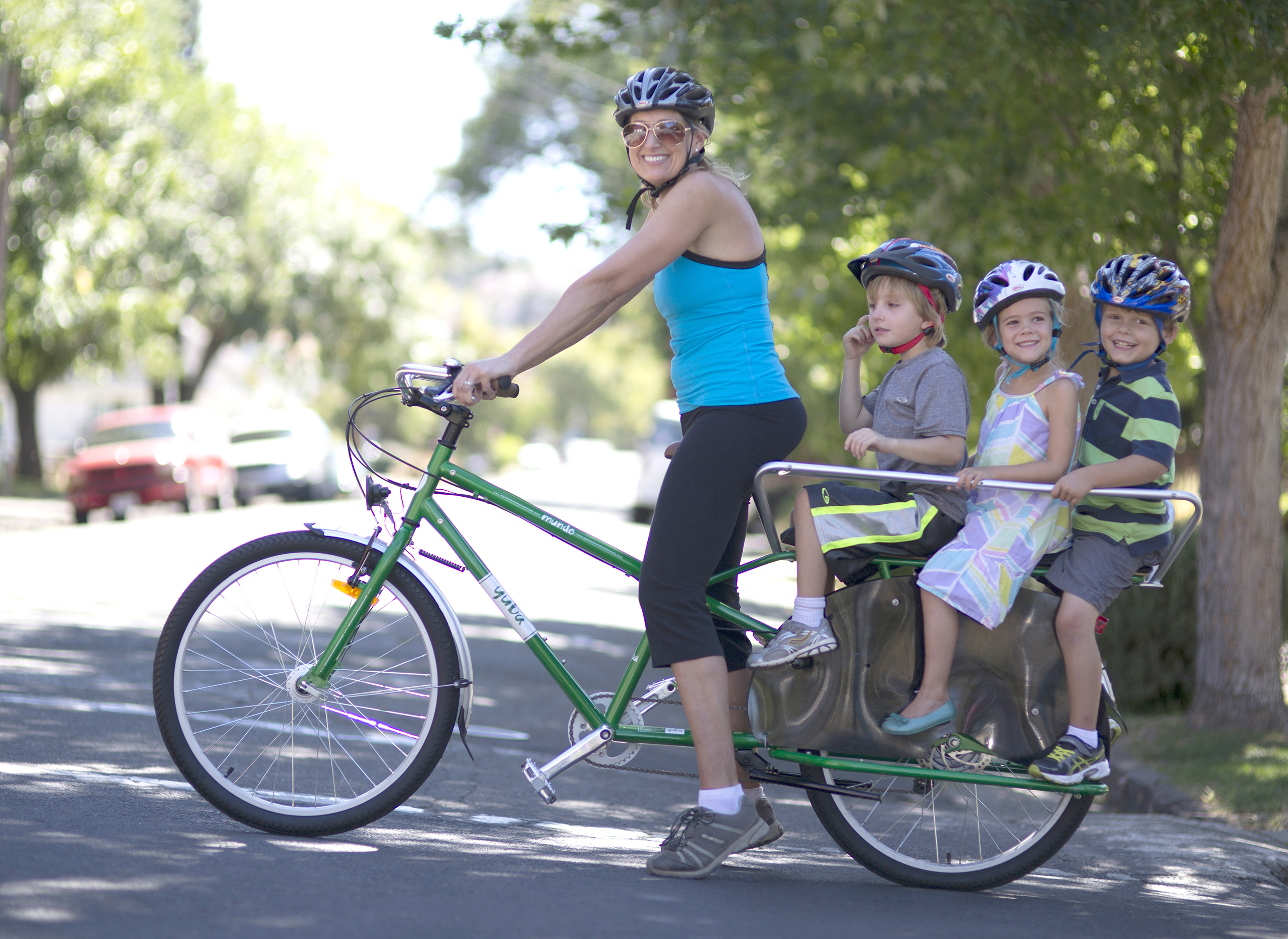
- Yuba Mundo Cargo Bike
- Industry: Bicycle manufacturing
- Founded: 2006; 19 years ago in Sausalito, California, U.S.
- Founder: Benjamin Sarrazin
- Headquarters: Lake Forest, California
- Areas served: Europe, United States
- Key people: Benjamin Sarrazin; Patrick Cunnane
- Products: Yuba Boda Boda; Yuba Kombi; Yuba Mundo; Yuba Spicy Curry; Yuba Baguette; Yuba Bread Basket; Yuba Monkey Bars
- Website: Yuba

Yuba Bicycles is a bicycle manufacturer based in Lake Forest, California. The company is known for making pedal and electric powered cargo bikes.

== History ==
=== Early history ===
In 2006, the company was founded by Benjamin Sarrazin in Sausalito, California. He had spent time in Africa and Latin America where he witnessed locals using bicycles to travel and carry items to remote areas. The company makes three different cargo bike types: compact, full size and front cargo. They also make electric versions of their bicycles, such as the Spicy Curry, Electric Supercargo or and Mundo Electric. The bicycles are all manufactured from either steel or aluminum and they have a carrying capacity of 400 to 440 pounds.

=== Distribution ===
The company's main distributor in the United States is HLC. In Europe the warehouses are in Heidelberg, Germany and their European headquarters in Annecy, France. Yuba sells bicycles in Australia, Norway, Germany and Belgium. In 2020 they experienced supply chain issues with drive components from Bosch and Shimano. Bicycles are sold to 150 individual bicycle dealers and then assembled by the technicians of the sales outlets.

In 2020 Yuba bicycles named Patrick Cunnane as their president of Yuba Bicycles North American operations and Chief operating officer of global business. In 2019 Cunnane was a consultant for the company.
