= David Dillon (businessman) =

American businessman (born 1951)

- Born: March 30, 1951 (age 75); Hutchinson, Kansas

David B. Dillon (born March 30, 1951) is an American businessman and former chief executive officer (CEO) of Kroger in Cincinnati, Ohio.

== Early life ==
Born in 1951 in Hutchinson, Kansas, Dillon graduated from Hutchinson High School in 1969. Dillon is an Eagle Scout and was a senior patrol leader in Boy Scout Troop 301, of which his father was Scoutmaster.

J.S. Dillon, Dillon's great-grandfather, a Presbyterian pastor, started a self-service grocery store in Sterling, Kansas. His sons, including David's grandfather, continued growing the enterprise into a chain of stores. David's father, Paul, along with two cousins, guided the corporation in the next generation when Dillon Stores became a public corporation. It was headquartered in Hutchinson, 20 miles from Sterling.

== Education ==
Dillon attended the University of Kansas, where he was student body president and initiated into Sigma Chi. Dillon also attended Southern Methodist University in Dallas, Texas.

== Career ==
Dillon worked for Dillons Stores with various leadership roles in the company. In 1982, Kroger bought out Dillon Stores.

In 1990, Dillon was named the Vice President of Kroger. In 2003, Dillon became the CEO of Kroger. Dillon succeeded its previous CEO Joe Pichler.

It was announced on September 20, 2013 that Dillon would be retiring as CEO of Kroger effective January 1, 2014. Dillon was succeeded as CEO by Rodney McMullen, a COO of Kroger. Dillon remained on as Chairman of the Board through the end of 2014.

Dillon sits on the board of directors of the Consumer Goods Forum.
