= Shira Goodman =

American businesswoman

Shira D. Goodman
- Born: 1961 or 1962 (age 64–65)
- Education: Princeton University; Sloan School of Management; Harvard Law School
- Title: Former CEO, Staples Inc.
- Term: September 2016 - January 2018
- Predecessor: Ron Sargent
- Spouse: Rabbi Wesley Gardenswartz
- Children: 3

Shira D. Goodman (born 1961/62) is an American businesswoman, and the former president and CEO of Staples Inc.

== Early life ==
She has a bachelor's degree from Princeton University, a master's degree with a concentration in strategy and marketing from MIT's Sloan School of Management, and a JD from Harvard Law School. Her first job was working as a waitress in a local deli shop.

== Career ==
Following her graduation from MIT Sloan, Goodman worked in consulting at Bain & Company, where she first became acquainted with Stemberg, as Staples was her client at Bain. The pair researched whether Staples should have a delivery business and Goodman eventually left Bain for Staples. Goodman joined Staples in 1992. Goodman was the first director of Marketing and Merchandising for the catalog business. At the time, Staples was just a small $30 million business unit. She worked her way up through several management jobs, eventually becoming president of its North American operations. In September 2016, she succeeded Ron Sargent as CEO. As CEO and a member of the board of directors, Goodman oversaw 75,000 employees and around 1,900 stores.

On January 26, 2018, Staples announced that Goodman will step down as CEO immediately, to be replaced by J. Alexander “Sandy” Douglas Jr.

== Personal life ==
She is married to Rabbi Wesley Gardenswartz, and they have three children: Nat, Sam, and Jordana. Goodman is Jewish.
