= Kestrel USA =

American bicycle manufacturer

Kestrel is an American bicycle brand which specialized in high-end bikes for triathlons and road racing.

Kestrel was acquired by Advanced Sports International in 2007. Advanced Sports International subsequently merged with Performance Bicycle to form ASE in 2016. ASE went bankrupt shortly thereafter in 2019 and the Kestrel brand wound up with BikeCo, which is owned by Hong Kong investor Advanced Holdings. BikeCo distributes Kestrel-branded scooters through Pacific Glory Worldwide. Their website nominally lists Kestrel bicycles, but none are available for purchase.

Kestrel evolved from Aegis, which pioneered carbon fiber frame design in the U.S. They designed the Trek 5000, the first U.S. mass-produced carbon fiber monocoque bicycle frame in collaboration with Trek. It was based on the first-ever Finite Element Analysis (FEA) of bicycle frame structure conducted by Peterson and Londry in 1986. With strongly opposed manufacturing philosophies, Aegis parted ways with members intent on producing frames utilizing the monocoque/one-piece construction technique. While the “other half” went West to establish Cycle Composites d/b/a Kestrel.

Kestrel set new standards again in 1989, with the launch of the first carbon fork and the debut of the KM40 Airfoil, the first true aero triathlon frame. Carbon framesets by better-known, mainstream manufacturers such as Giant and, most notably, Trek (with its OCLV frames), have been directly influenced by Kestrel design principles.

Kestrel has built monocoque frames rather than more traditional tube and lug designs. This has always meant that Kestrels have tended to have a very fluid, curved appearance. However, more recent designs from the company have been more angular due to an increased desire to minimise wind resistance.

== Timeline ==
- 1986: Kestrel is formed from a group of Aegis employees together with aerospace materials experts
- 1986: Kestrel's first bicycle, the Kestrel 4000 road bike, is released, featuring an all-carbon, fully aerodynamic frame design
- 1986: Kestrel is the first in the industry to introduce bladder-molded monocoque carbon structures.
- 1988: The company unveils the "Nitro" full-suspension mountain bike after collaboration with Keith Bontrager
- 1989: World's first carbon fork, the EMS
- 1989: Kestrel is the first company to use higher stiffness, "intermediate modulus" carbon fiber in the 200 EMS.
- 1989: World's first all-carbon triathlon bike, the KM40
- 1992: First "modern" seat-tube-less design, the 500SCi, demonstrating the structural flexibility offered by composite construction
- 1999: The KM40 Airfoil becomes the first molded, composite frame designed completely with 3-D solid modeling techniques.
- 2001: Kestrel introduces its EMS Pro Series, a molded carbon road handlebar.
- 2003: Chris McCormack wins his first Ironman aboard a Kestrel and kicks off a superb partnership.
- 2007: The RT-700 is recognized by Outside Magazine with "Bike of the Year" honors.
- 2008: Kestrel is purchased by Advanced Sports International and joins Fuji & SE under the ASI family.
- 2010: Kestrel reintroduces the 4000 triathlon/time trial model.
- 2011: Kestrel signs Ironman Champion Andy Potts and up-and-comer Cameron Dye. Members of the GEOX-TMC professional cycling team, including 2009 Giro d'Italia Champion Denis Menchov and 2008 Tour de France Winner Carlos Sastre, use Kestrel as their time trial bike in major international ProTour events - including the Vuelta a España, where they helped teammate Juan Jose Cobo win his first grand tour. With five wins aboard his Kestrel 4000, Andy Potts is crowned the 2011 Race to the Toyota Cup Series Champion.
- 2012: The new Kestrel RT1000 - a bike designed for the endurance rider - hits the market, and the Kestrel 4000 becomes the official TT bike of Champion System, the first ever professional continental cycling team based out of Asia. Cameron Dye is named 2012 Non-Olympic/ITU Athlete of the Year by USA Triathlon, after his career-best, six-win season aboard his 4000, which also earned him the 2012 Race to the Toyota Cup series title.
- 2013: Kestrel launches its brand-new Legend: the lightest frame Kestrel has ever produced.
- 2014: Kestrel launches the new, improved Talon Road/Triathlon Bike for the 2015 racing season.
- 2019: ASE, the new owner of Kestrel, undergoes bankruptcy proceedings. Kestrel winds up with BikeCo.
- 2020: Remaining stock of Kestrel bicycles is sold. Future availability is unclear.
- 2022: BikeCo launches Kestrel Scooters through its distributor Pacific Glory Worldwide, LTD.
- 2025: With no products available for purchase, the Kestrel brand appears to be defunct.
