= Rodney McMullen =

American businessman (born 1961)

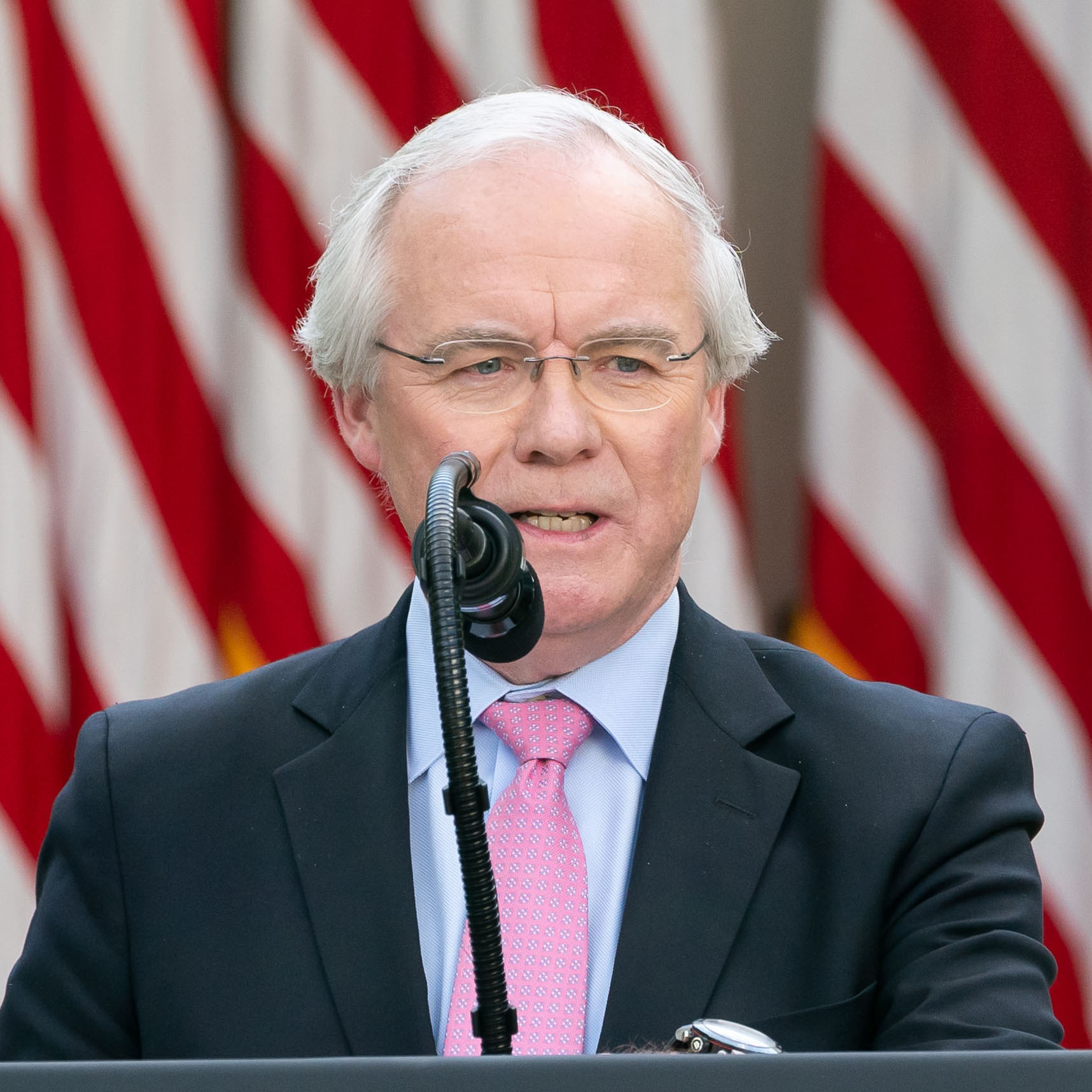
- McMullen in 2020
- Born: 1960 or 1961 (age 64–65); Pineville, Kentucky, U.S.
- Education: University of Kentucky (BS, MS)
- Occupation: Businessman
- Known for: CEO, Kroger
- Term: 2014–2025
- Predecessor: David Dillon
- Successor: Ron Sargent (interim)
- Spouse: Kathryn King McMullen

William Rodney McMullen (born 1961) is an American businessman who was the chief executive officer (CEO) of Kroger, the third-largest general retailer in the United States, from 2014 until 2025. In March 2025, McMullen resigned abruptly after an investigation found his personal conduct did not align with Kroger's business ethics.

== Early life ==
McMullen was born in Pineville, Kentucky on his family-owned farm, and was the first of his family to receive a college education. He has a bachelor's and a master's degree in accounting, both from the University of Kentucky.

== Career ==
In 1978, McMullen began working part-time as a stock clerk at a Kroger grocery store in Lexington, Kentucky, while a university student. His work included price tagging items, bagging groceries, receiving product, and running the register.

In 1982, McMullen moved to Charlotte, North Carolina to work as an accounting supervisor for Kroger. In 1986, he became a financial analyst at Kroger's corporate headquarters in Cincinnati.

In 1995, McMullen became chief financial officer of Kroger. He oversaw Kroger's acquisition of Fred Meyer, Inc. in 1999.

In 2000, McMullen became Kroger's executive vice president of strategy, planning, and finance. In 2003, McMullen became vice chairman of Kroger, and then became president and chief operating officer in 2009.

McMullen became the CEO of Kroger on January 1, 2014, succeeding David Dillon. He was appointed as chairman of the company in 2015. In 2025, McMullen resigned as chairman and CEO after a board investigation found that his personal conduct was inconsistent with the grocer's "policy on business ethics."

McMullen is a non-executive director of Cincinnati Financial.

== Compensation ==
In 2013, McMullen received $8.8 million in compensation from Kroger.

McMullen received $12 million in compensation in fiscal year 2018, jumping by 21 percent to $20.1 million in 2019 due to "a boost in stock awards tied to performance incentives."

In 2020, his salary plus bonuses plus various stock options totaled $20,578,119.

In 2021, McMullen's salary was listed at $1.34 million, while the median employee salary at Kroger that year was a bit more than $24,000. This indicates McMullen makes 5,348 percent of the median salary, which is one of the largest wage gaps in America. His total compensation for 2021 was $18 million.

In 2022, McMullen's total compensation rose $1 million to $19 million, with the ratio of McMullen's pay to that of the median Kroger worker for that year standing at 671-to-1.

In 2023, McMullen's total compensation from Kroger was $15.7 million, or 502 times what the median employee at Kroger earned that same year.

== Personal life ==
He is married to Kathryn King McMullen, whom he met when they were both students at the University of Kentucky.
