= Howard Head =

American businessman (1914–1991)

- Born: July 31, 1914; Philadelphia, Pennsylvania, U.S.
- Died: March 3, 1996 (aged 81); Baltimore, Maryland, U.S.
- Resting place: West Laurel Hill Cemetery, Bala Cynwyd, Pennsylvania, U.S.
- Education: Harvard College
- Employer(s): The March of Time; Glenn L. Martin Company; Head Ski Company; Prince Sports
- Spouse(s): Anne Wales Christenson; Martha Becker Fritzlen
- Children: 1

Howard Head (July 31, 1914 – March 3, 1991) was an American businessman who invented the first commercially successful brand of aluminum laminate skis, the Head Standard. He founded the Head Ski Company in 1948 and by 1955, Head Skis were the top selling brand in Europe and North America. He became the chairman of the board of Head Ski Company in 1968 and sold it to AMF in 1971. He also invented the oversized tennis racket, and served as chairman of the board of Prince Sports. He was inducted into the U.S. Ski & Snowboard Hall of Fame in 1979 and the National Inventors Hall of Fame in 2017.

== Early life and education ==
He was born July 31, 1914, in Philadelphia, Pennsylvania, to Dr. Joseph Head and Anne Wilkinson Head. He graduated in 1936 from Harvard College with a B.A. in engineering sciences. He worked in journalism at the news-film outlet, The March of Time.

== Career ==
He joined the engineering department of the Glenn L. Martin Company in Baltimore, Maryland. He went skiing for the first time in 1947 and was frustrated with the quality of the wooden skis, which he found clumsy and heavy and felt they made skiing very difficult. He quit his job at Glenn L. Martin Company and worked to develop lighter and more flexible skis. He allegedly used $6,000 in earnings from poker and money borrowed from friends to enter the ski-making business with three part-time colleagues. He founded the Head Ski Company in 1948.

His metal skis were not the first patented or manufactured. A patent for a metal ski was granted to Everett Hunt in 1924. The Chance Vought Aircraft company manufactured a thousand pairs of aluminum skis in 1945. Chance Vought was looking for new markets for their metal manufacturing technique, however they landed a new contract for airplane manufacturing and dropped the ski line.

Head worked to develop skis based on technology common in the aircraft industry. The skis would be based on a metal sandwich design with two layers of lightweight aluminum attached to thin plywood walls with an interior of plastic honeycomb. Although these skis were very light, they all broke during trials. He asked skiing instructors in Stowe, Vermont, to test the skis and offer recommendations for improvements. Head substituted plywood for honeycomb plastic, covered the bottom of the ski with plastic to avoid ice accumulation, and added hard steel edges to the skis. This resulted in a ski that was as strong as wood skis but significantly lighter. It took three years and 40 trial versions of skis to come up with a final version that worked.

Head Standard skis

In 1950, he launched the successful Head Standard brand of skis, which users found to be flexible, responsive, and easier to use. Head Skis were the leading brand of skis in Europe and North America by 1955. Jean-Claude Killy began using Head Skis in 1960 and Jean Saubert won three Olympic medals in skiing during the 1964 Winter Olympics while using Head designed skis.

He became chairman of the board of the Head Ski Company in 1968. He created a tennis division at Head Sports Co. in 1968 and patented a metal oversized racquet. Head sold the company to AMF in 1971.

He took up tennis as a hobby and discovered that the equipment for tennis was also sub-optimal. He purchased a tennis ball machine manufactured by Prince Manufacturing Inc., but was dissatisfied with how it worked. He worked on improving the ball serving machine and bought the company.

He found the existing tennis rackets twisted in a players hand during an off-center ball strike. He again set off to improve sporting equipment by designing a tennis racket that would be more controllable during an off center ball strike. In 1971, he became the chairman of the board of Prince Manufacturing, Inc.

He experimented with tennis racquet design and this led to the Prince Classic racquet, made from aluminum and much lighter and more flexible. It was initially ridiculed by professional players due to its oversized head. However, recreational players valued it for its lighter weight, larger "sweet-spot" for hitting accurate shots, and increased power. Professional players soon became advocates for the racquet when Arthur Ashe and Pam Shriver began playing and winning with Prince racquets. In the late 1970s and 1980s, Prince controlled 30% of the tennis racquet market share in the United States and 25% globally. The company was sold to Cheesebrough Pond in 1982 and Head retired soon afterwards. He spent his time with philanthropic activities in Baltimore and Aspen, Colorado.

He died March 3, 1991, at Johns Hopkins Hospital in Baltimore due to complications from heart surgery. He was interred at West Laurel Hill Cemetery in Bala Cynwyd, Pennsylvania.

== Personal life ==
He married Anne Wales Christenson in 1939 and together they had one daughter. They divorced and Head remarried Martha Becker Fritzlen in 1984.

== Legacy ==
He was inducted into the U.S. Ski & Snowboard Hall of Fame in 1979 and National Inventors Hall of Fame in 2017. His papers and collection of sporting equipment was donated by his wife to the National Museum of American History in 1997.
