= Head Standard =

Ski design

One of a pair of Head Standard skis. These are equipped with the Cubco binding, one of the earliest release binding systems. An anti-friction pad has been added behind the toe clip, likely after the bindings were originally mounted.

The Head Standard was Howard Head's first successful ski design, and arguably the first modern downhill ski. The Standard used composite construction, with a plywood core sandwiched between aluminum outer skins, steel edges tapering into the core, and a hard plastic base, sidewalls and topsheet. The only major changes in ski materials since the Standard are the use of fibreglass structural layers in place of (or in addition to) the aluminum layers, and substitution of expanded plastic foam for the wooden core.

The Standard was flexible in length and stiff in torsion, which allowed it to be easily turned while still holding a good edge. This combination was so impressive that it became known as "The Cheater" for the way it allowed beginners to turn like pros. The Standard, and models that followed it, were so successful that half the downhill skis in the US in the 1960s were Heads.

== History ==
=== Early attempts ===
A number of metal skis were introduced over the years: among them the 1942 All Magnesium; a post-war run of 1,000 Truflex aluminum skis (made of Metalite, a sandwich of aluminum and balsa wood) from Chance Vought; the stainless steel Chris Ski; the TEY Alu-60 (later known as the Aluflex); the Dow Metal Air Ski; and the Gomme from the UK.

All of these designs had numerous problems. In cold snow, ice would freeze to the bottom metal layer and made them very difficult to move. The same was true for wood skis, but these could hold wax that solved the problem. When applied to metal skis, the wax quickly rubbed off. Additionally, metal designs tended to be very springy, and were notorious for vibrating when running on ice. And a strong flex or collision could leave them permanently bent and unskiable. Skiers soon came to dismiss them as "tin cans."

=== Head fails ===
In 1939, Howard Head took a job as a riveter at the Glenn L. Martin Company in Baltimore, where he worked his way up the company ladder during the war, eventually becoming a draftsman. Martin had pioneered the use of a plastic honeycomb material sandwiched between two thin sheets of aluminum to build bulkheads and floors in post-war aircraft.

In 1947, Head skied at Mount Mansfield, better known today as part of Stowe Mountain Resort. He was immediately frustrated by the weight of his rented hickory skis, which he felt were archaic in an era of modern lightweight materials. On the train back to Baltimore, he thought about building a ski using Martin's aluminum/plastic sandwich, becoming so excited about the prospect that he sketched the concept and showed it to his carriage mate. Back at work, he compared the strength of Martin's laminates to the strength of hickory that he found in an engineering textbook, and was encouraged: "It looked like I could build a ski with the strength of wood, but with half the weight."

Investing $6,000 of poker winnings, Head rented the corner of an electrical shop and started work on a composite ski. The main portion of the ski was built of the standard laminate, but this left the edges of honeycomb exposed, so he capped the sides with thin sheets of plywood. The ski was laid up in pieces and covered with a thermosetting shoemaker's glue. In lieu of the large moulds typically used to create the requisite pressure and heat for the glue to bond, Head put the skis in a heavy rubber bag and pumped out all of the air, using the resulting vacuum for pressure, then immersed the entire assembly in a barrel of boiling crankcase oil.

Having completed six pairs of prototype skis, Head brought them to Mansfield in December of 1947 and showed them to the instructors. They tried flexing the skis; five of the pairs immediately fell apart. Most of the instructors left for the day, but Neil Robinson tried his pair. He returned them to Head and said that in the few minutes he was able to keep on top of them, he "felt something." Head tried them, but made it only a short way before they failed as well. (Note: Only Lund suggests Head made it onto his own skis, Leuthner stops with Robinson's attempt.)

=== Head succeeds ===
Returning to Baltimore, Head left his job at Martin on January 2, 1948 to work on ski design full-time. He applied a full stress test to a pair of commercial hickory skis, and found that the wood was actually twice as strong as stated in the engineering texts he had consulted previously. This explained the failure of his skis: he had designed them to match the lower strength incorrectly set forth in those texts.

Head found that the plastic core was simply too weak to match the strength of the hickory, so he replaced it with a much stronger sheet of marine plywood. Over the next year, he and a number of moonlighting Martin engineers made 40 pairs of skis and shipped them to Robinson and Don Traynor at Mansfield for testing. When each pair failed, they built another pair that strengthened the specific area of weakness responsible for the failure.

By Christmas 1949 a set of ten greatly improved versions were ready for testing. Head gave pairs to Steve Knowlton and Clif Taylor, formerly of the 10th Mountain Division and now instructors at Aspen Ski School. They found the skis performed well in the powder on the upper mountain, but as they descended to harder snow the edges would not dig in and the skis became impossible to turn. At the bottom, where it was warmer, the snow stuck to the skis and they stopped dead, forcing them to walk them down the hill. Taylor told Head that the skis needed real edges and a way for the bottoms to hold wax. Less constructively, Knowlton suggested the shiny skis would function better as a mirror in the local outhouse.

The solution to the turning problem had already been used in the ski industry: thin strips of carbon steel edges, bound to the ski with small screws. Head's laminated design would not accept screws, so he crafted steel edges with a flange that extended sideways about 1/5 of the way into the base of the ski. The edges were laid up and bonded into the base as the ski was glued together. The new version solved the problem of soft edges, and greatly improved the ski's overall performance as well.

To solve the problem with sticking snow, Head adapted another solution being widely introduced in the industry. TEY, creators of the earlier Tru-Flex and Alu 60 designs, had been selling a self-adhesive celloid plastic sheet that could be used with any ski, eliminating the need for waxing. Head took this one step further, using a thicker phenolic plastic sheet and bonding it to the ski along with the other layers.

In late spring of 1950, Head met Taylor with his prototypes at Tuckerman Ravine on Mount Washington in New Hampshire, the only place left in the east with good snow at that time. Taylor skied them for five days on all types of snow. Then Head asked him to really run them out at high speed, and they worked flawlessly. Head later noted that "When I saw Clif coming at me, that fast and that surely, I knew deep inside that I had it."

=== Starting sales ===
Head introduced his new design in the winter of 1950-51, shipping pairs of skis on consignment all across the US, and taking to the hills himself, selling them out of the back of his station wagon. By the end of the year, he had sold 300 pairs of the $85 skis. One last problem needed to be solved; the mirror-like topsheet was distracting in the sun, so he added a thin sheet of black plastic to the top. The result was the Head Standard, which would remain largely unchanged for over a decade.

On the slopes, skiers found they could turn the ski far easier than wooden designs. Head later noted that "...lightness is not what makes a ski better. In trying to build a lighter ski, I accidentally created a ski that was stiffer in torsion, one that would turn and track more easily. That was the magic difference." The Standard was three times as stiff torsionally as wooden skis, which allowed the edge to be driven into the snow much more strongly. The effect was so pronounced that they became known as "The Cheater" because it made beginners look like pros. News of their ease of skiing spread quickly, and over the next winter 1,100 pairs were sold, with 2,200 pairs sold in 1952-53. This was in spite of them selling for $75 to $85, roughly twice the price of high-end wooden designs.

In 1956 Head developed the first damping system for skis, inserting a neoprene layer under the top aluminum sheet. This reduced chattering at high speeds while enabling the ski to "snake" over bumps. In 1961 they introduced this improvement in the Head Competition line. In 1963 Joos Minsch won the downhill at Innsbruck on a pair. The next year Jean Saubert skied them to two medals at the Winter Olympics in Innsbruck. Two years later a third of all skiers in the top 10 of every major downhill race were on Head Competitions, winning a total of 18 gold medals, 15 silver and 15 bronze.

Several new models based on the basic Standard model followed. These included the Vector, Master and others. In 1967 the last major introduction in the Standard-based line was the Head 360, based on the Competition structure but with a flex suitable for intermediate skiers. It would go on to be one of the best selling skis in history. Several versions were spun off from the 360 line, including the 720 and 180.

=== Moving on ===
In 1966 the Head Ski Company had more than 500 employees and was grossing $25 million a year on the sale of nearly 300,000 pairs of skis in 17 countries, by far the largest manufacturer of skis in the world. Sales continued to improve throughout the 1950s and 60s, until at one point 50% of all skis in the US were Heads. The competition was quick to introduce similar models of their own, but Head continued development and maintained a leadership position throughout.

However, it was during this period that the fibreglass construction started to become popular, and improved rapidly. Head hated the concept and refused to consider studying it, claiming "Fiberglass is a flash in the pan. It will be gone tomorrow." But this attitude changed when Jean-Claude Killy continued winning races on the Dynamic VR-17, one of the first successful "torsion box" racing skis. Head responded by hiring Killy and his ski technician to help them tune a new fibreglass design of their own. The resulting Killy 800 almost killed the company when the plastic used on the new bright-red topsheet started cracking in dry climates. Worse, as designed for Killy, the ski turned out to be far too stiff even for the expert recreational skiers it was sold to. The product was improved and became the basis for Head ski designs in the 1970s.

Head was also infamous for interfering in day-to-day operations of the company. In 1968 a management team was brought in to run the company, leaving Head as the chairman. Head preferred to be a hands-on manager, and after being pushed from the ski operations he lost interest and turned his attention to tennis. He started development of an aluminum tennis racquet, but in 1969 he sold the entire company to AMF for $16 million. Taking up tennis in earnest, his trainer quit in frustration and told Head to keep practicing with a ball throwing machine. The machine broke constantly, so Head tore it apart and re-designed it. Approaching the company with some improvements, instead he purchased Prince Sports outright. Continuing development of the aluminum racquet, Head invented the modern oversized design that revolutionized the industry.
