= Ron Sargent =

American businessman (born 1955)

- Born: Ronald L. Sargent
- Education: Harvard University (BA, MBA)
- Occupations: Chairman of Kroger; Former Interim CEO of Kroger; Former CEO of Staples

Ronald L. "Ron" Sargent (born 1955) is an American businessman who served as chairman of the Kroger board from March 2025 through June 2026, becoming non-executive chairman on July 1, 2026. He served as the company's interim CEO from March 2025 to February 2026. He was previously the chairman and CEO of Staples, Inc., where he was in leadership for 15 years.

== Education ==
In 1977, Sargent earned a BA from Harvard University. In 1979, Sargent earned an MBA from Harvard Business School.

== Career ==
Sargent started his career at Kroger Co., stocking shelves and working in the mailroom. He went on to hold senior roles with the company in store operations, human resources, strategy, manufacturing, sales, and marketing. He left Kroger in 1989 and joined Staples as regional vice president. In 1991, Sargent became head of the Staples catalog division, and in 1997, he became head of North American operations. In 2002, Sargent became the CEO of Staples.

On May 31, 2016, Staples announced that Sargent would step down as CEO and be succeeded by Shira Goodman after the company's annual shareholder meeting on June 14, 2016. The company's board of directors and Sargent mutually agreed that it was time for new management after Staples and Office Depot called off their $6 billion merger amid regulatory roadblocks. Sargent, who became chairman of Staples in 2005, remained on the board after stepping down as CEO and served as non-executive chairman through January 2017, the end of the company's fiscal year.

On February 20, 2017, Wells Fargo announced that Sargent had been elected to its board as an independent director. As of March 2025, Sargent continued to serve on the board of Wells Fargo, as well as the board of directors for Five Below, Inc. He was also on the Boys & Girls Clubs of America board of governors, the board of directors for City of Hope, and the Northeastern University board of trustees.

As of April 2022, Sargent served as chairman of the John F. Kennedy Presidential Library in Boston. He has been a minority owner of Major League Baseball's Cincinnati Reds since 2006.

On March 3, 2025, Sargent was named interim CEO of Kroger, after the resignation of Rodney McMullen. He also became chairman of the company's board of directors, which he joined in 2006. He served as interim CEO until February 2026, when the company appointed Greg Foran to the position. On July 1, 2026, Sargent became non-executive chairman of the board after stepping down as an employee of the company.
