= Advanced Sports International =

American bicycle company

- Type: Private
- Industry: Bicycles
- Founded: 1998; 28 years ago
- Fate: Chapter 11 bankruptcy in 2018; wholesale assets purchased by BikeCo in 2019
- Headquarters: Philadelphia, Pennsylvania, U.S.
- Brands: Fuji Bikes, Kestrel USA, SE Bikes
- Revenue: $50 million (2007); $105 million (2015)
- Owner: BikeCo (since 2019)
- Website: www.advancedsports.com

Advanced Sports International (ASI) is an American bicycle company headquartered in Philadelphia, Pennsylvania. Its flagship brand is Fuji Bikes, with smaller brands including triathlon-focused Kestrel USA, component maker Oval Concepts, Breezer bikes, Tuesday Cycles and BMX maker SE Bikes.

== History ==
The company was established in 1998. ASI was led by Patrick Cunnane until filing for bankruptcy in 2018. The company has generally followed a strategy of buying struggling brands and returning them to profitability. ASI purchased Fuji Bikes in 1998 after Fuji's sales had declined due to missing the mountain biking boom. It soon repositioned the brand from a mass-market brand sold mainly in sporting goods stores to a higher-end brand sold by more independent bicycle dealers.

In 2007, the company's total revenue was $50 million, with about 5% market share among bikes sold by independent dealers. ASI bought Breezer Bikes in 2008, the bicycle component manufacturer Oval Concepts in 2009, and Phat Cycles in 2015. Other brands it has purchased include Fuji Bikes, SE, Kestrel, and Tuesday Cycles.

By 2015, ASI's revenue had grown to $105 million. It is associated with the Taiwanese bicycle manufacturer Ideal Bike Corp. In August 2016, ASI purchased the bicycle retailer Performance Bicycle (owner of the e-commerce site and retailer Nashbar) for an undisclosed amount. As part of the deal, a new parent company called Advanced Sports Enterprises was created to "oversee brand development, wholesale and retail operations, while ASI’s wholesale and Performance Bicycle’s retail operations would be separately managed."

The parent company ASE filed for Chapter 11 bankruptcy two years later, listing debts of more than $100 million. Most of ASE's assets, including some Performance Bicycle stores, were tentatively purchased at a bankruptcy auction in January 2019 by the Amsterdam-based company Head Sport for $21.5 million. Another asset, the Roubaix bike trademark, was purchased by Specialized Bikes for $700,000. However, the deal fell through, and in February 2019, ASI was purchased for $16.1 million and split among three entities---Amain.com Inc, K&B Investment Corporation, and BikeCo, a partnership of Tiger Capital Group and Advanced Holdings. Amain received the Performance and Nashbar businesses and trademarks, K&B Investment Corporation received ASE's property and buildings, and BikeCo received ASI and its wholesale businesses and bike trademarks.

In August 2019, ASE, renamed AE Bike Liquidation, Inc., sent letters against 30 suppliers seeking to recover "so-called "preferential payments" that suppliers received from Performance and the other brands in the weeks before than bankruptcy filing." The payments, if recovered, would go towards the company's bankruptcy obligations. Seven suppliers settled. In November 2020, lawsuits were filed against the other 27 for a total of $2.6 million.
