= SE Racing =

BMX bike manufacturer

SE Bikes
- Logo for SE Bikes
- Industry: Bicycles
- Predecessor: SE Racing
- Founded: 1977; 49 years ago in Long Beach, California, U.S.
- Founder: Scot Breithaupt
- Fate: Acquired by BikeCo, LLC.
- Successor: BikeCo
- Headquarters: Philadelphia, United States
- Area served: Worldwide
- Key people: Scot Breithaupt (Founder); Todd Lyons (Brand Manager)
- Products: PK Ripper, Blocks Flyer, Big Ripper, PK Ripper Super Elite, Fast Ripper, Killer Quad, So Cal Flyer, Fat Ripper, Maniacc Flyer, Savage Flyer, Basher, Colossal Ripper, OM Ripper, Big Flyer, Beast Mode Ripper
- Website: SE Bikes

SE Racing was a BMX bicycle company which was founded in 1977 by Scot Breithaupt (Scot Enterprises) in Long Beach, California. The company manufactured the PK Ripper BMX bike, Quadangle, Bronco, Assassin, OM Flyer, and the Floval Flyer.

SE Bikes Models

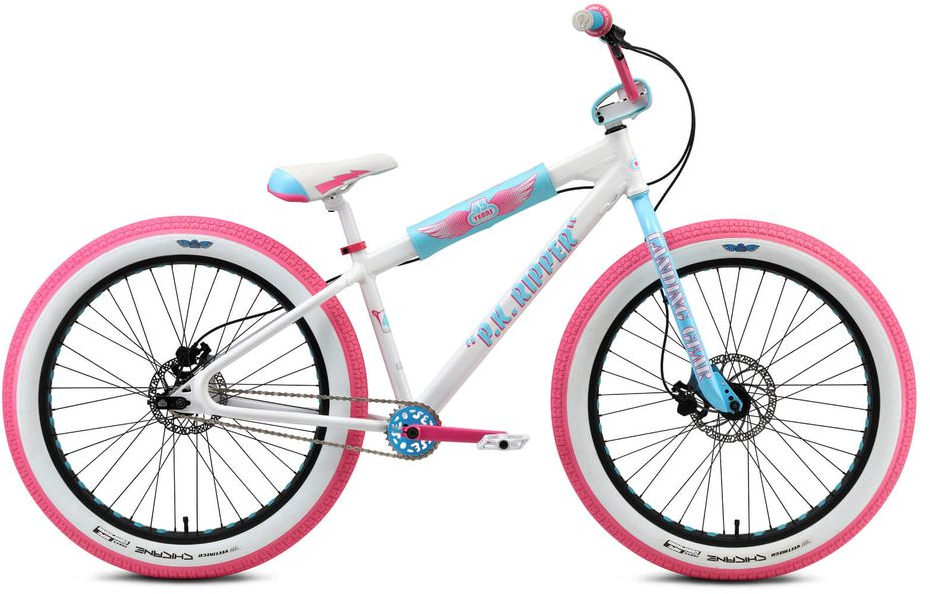
SE Bikes Fat Ripper 26

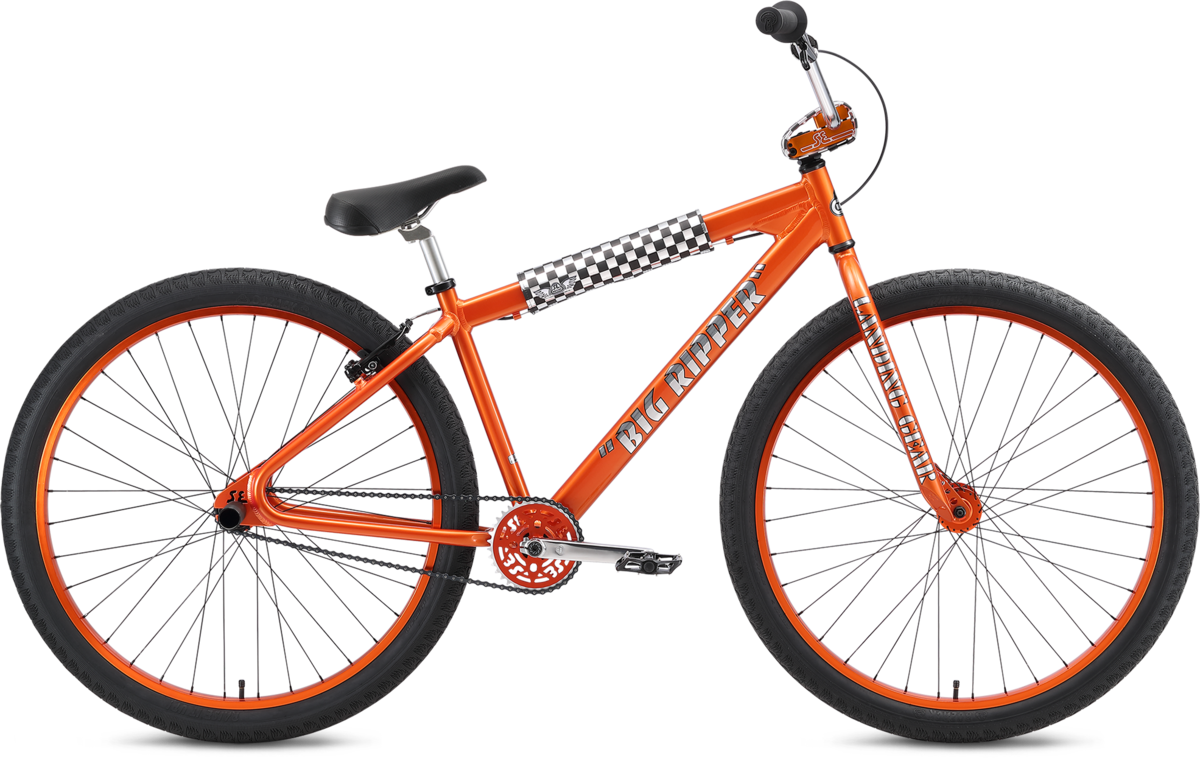
SE Bikes Big Ripper 29 (2023)

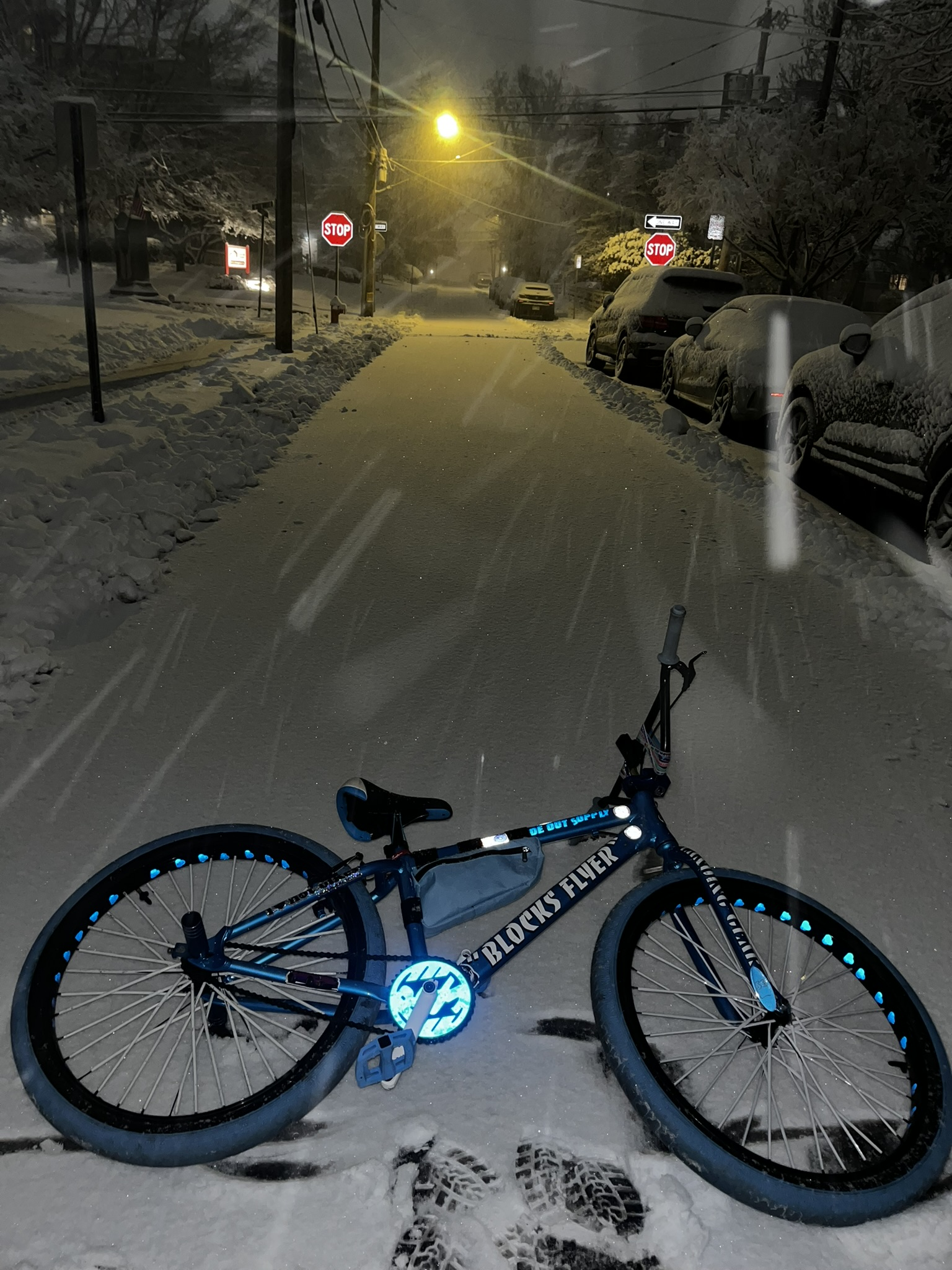
An SE Bike model

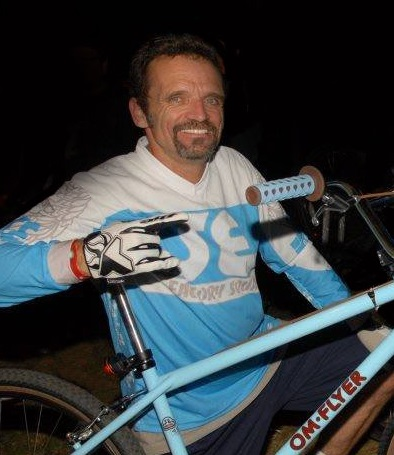
Scot Breithaupt, Founder of SE Racing

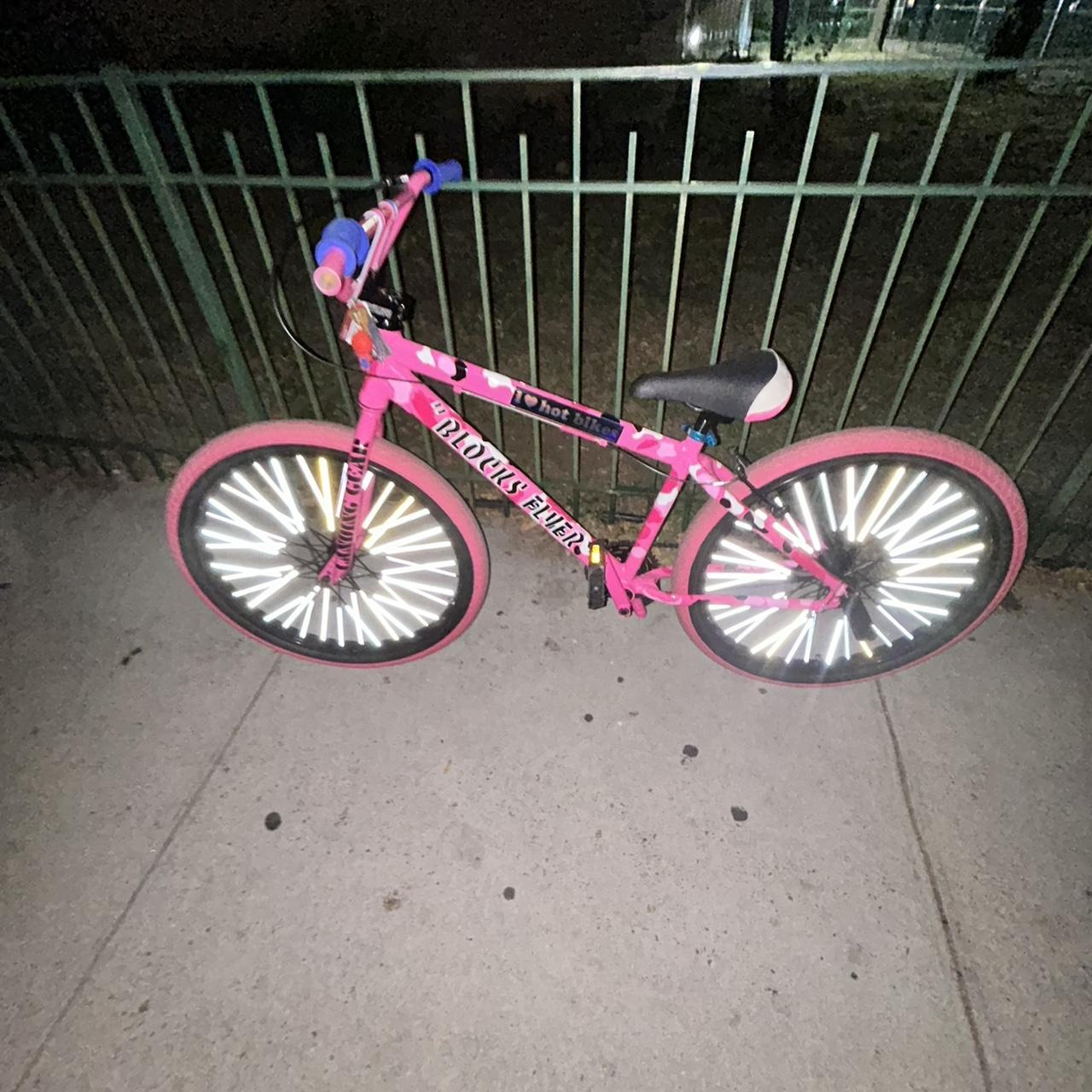
A Pink SE Bike with accessories

== History ==
=== SE Racing ===
The company was originally called Scot Enterprises and later SE Racing. SE Racing began experimenting with flat oval aluminum tubing that they called Floval. In 1977 SE Racing produced the JU-6, named after Jeff Utterback, who finished 6th nationally for SE's racing team. The Floval frame featured elongated aluminum tubes with long welds which eliminated the need for Gusset plates. The aluminum frame was also one third the weight of Chromoly steel. The Floval also had 24″ wheels.

In 1979 the PK Ripper was manufactured by SE Racing. The bike was named for BMX racer Perry Kramer. When the bike was introduced, it was considered cutting edge, and 2000 units were sold before the company had even shipped any units. The PK Ripper is the longest production BMX bike and is still in production as of 2022.

=== SE Bikes ===
SE Racing is now called (SE Bikes). They continue to produce the PK Ripper and the Floval Flyer. The company has collaborated with the shoe company Vans to create BMX shoes.

BikeCo, LLC is the distributor of SE Bikes, and they are headquartered in Philadelphia.

== See also ==
- List of BMX bicycle manufacturers
