= Indian Mountain Lake, Pennsylvania =

Unincorporated community in Pennsylvania, US

- Census-designated place
- Location in Pennsylvania Indian Mountain Lake (the United States)
- Coordinates: 41°0′18″N 75°30′11″W
- Country: United States
- State: Pennsylvania
- Counties: Carbon, Monroe
- Townships: Penn Forest, Tunkhannock, Chestnuthill

Area
  - Total: 6.46 sq mi (16.73 km^{2})
  - Land: 6.37 sq mi (16.50 km^{2})
  - Water: 0.089 sq mi (0.23 km^{2})
- Elevation: 1,785 ft (544 m)

Population (2020)
  - Total: 4,733
  - Density: 742.8/sq mi (286.79/km^{2})
- Time zone: UTC-5 (Eastern (EST))
  - Summer (DST): UTC-4 (EDT)
- Area codes: 570 and 272
- FIPS code: 42-36904
- GNIS feature ID: 2633697

Indian Mountain Lake is a census-designated place (CDP) in Carbon County and Monroe County, Pennsylvania. It is part of Northeastern Pennsylvania.

The Carbon County portion of the CDP is located in Penn Forest Township, while the Monroe County portion is in Tunkhannock and Chestnuthill townships. As of the 2020 census, the population of the community was 4,733. There are 3,262 single-family residential building lots in the community as of 2020 records.

== History and geography ==
The community of Indian Mountain Lake lies at the southern edge of the Poconos, on top of Pohopoco Mountain and extending north to the valley of Mud Run, which is impounded to form the small Indian Mountain Lake. The western edge of the CDP follows Pennsylvania Route 534, and Pennsylvania Route 115 crosses the eastern side of the community. Interstate 80 is 7 miles (11 km) to the northwest via PA 115, and Brodheadsville on U.S. Route 209 is 8 miles (13 km) to the south.

Historical population
| Census | Pop. | Note | %± |
|---|---|---|---|
| 2010 | 4,372 | | — |
| 2020 | 4,733 | | 8.3% |
U.S. Decennial Census

== Demographics ==
=== 2020 census ===
As of the 2020 census, Indian Mountain Lake had a population of 4,733. The median age was 41.4 years. 23.6% of residents were under the age of 18 and 17.7% of residents were 65 years of age or older. For every 100 females there were 99.5 males, and for every 100 females age 18 and over there were 97.4 males age 18 and over.

0.0% of residents lived in urban areas, while 100.0% lived in rural areas.

There were 1,858 households in Indian Mountain Lake, of which 32.0% had children under the age of 18 living in them. Of all households, 51.9% were married-couple households, 17.5% were households with a male householder and no spouse or partner present, and 22.9% were households with a female householder and no spouse or partner present. About 23.9% of all households were made up of individuals and 9.6% had someone living alone who was 65 years of age or older.

There were 2,610 housing units, of which 28.8% were vacant. The homeowner vacancy rate was 1.5% and the rental vacancy rate was 9.3%.

Racial composition as of the 2020 census
| Race | Number | Percent |
|---|---|---|
| White | 3,395 | 71.7% |
| Black or African American | 504 | 10.6% |
| American Indian and Alaska Native | 23 | 0.5% |
| Asian | 87 | 1.8% |
| Native Hawaiian and Other Pacific Islander | 3 | 0.1% |
| Some other race | 279 | 5.9% |
| Two or more races | 442 | 9.3% |
| Hispanic or Latino (of any race) | 692 | 14.6% |

== Education ==
Within Monroe County, the Tunkhannock Township part is in the Pocono Mountain School District. The Chestnuthill Township part is in the Pleasant Valley School District.

The Carbon County portion is in Jim Thorpe Area School District.
