= Sierra View, Pennsylvania =

Unincorporated community in Pennsylvania, US

Coordinates: 40°59′28″N 75°26′00″W

- Census-designated place
- Interactive map of Sierra View, Pennsylvania
- Country: United States
- State: Pennsylvania
- County: Monroe
- Townships: Chestnuthill, Tunkhannock

Population (2020)
  - Total: 4,907
- Time zone: UTC-5 (Eastern (EST))
  - Summer (DST): UTC-4 (EDT)
- ZIP code: 18330
- Area code(s): 570

Sierra View is a census-designated place that is located in the Chestnuthill and Tunkhannocks townships in Monroe County in the state of Pennsylvania.

As of the 2020 census, the population was 4,907 residents.

== Geography ==
Sierra View is located near Sun Valley.

== Demographics ==
Historical population
Census	Pop.	Note	%±
2010	4,813		—
2020	4,907		2.0%

Sierra View had moderate population growth in the 2010s, growing 2% during the decade.

=== 2020 census ===
As of the 2020 census, Sierra View had a population of 4,907. The median age was 42.0 years. 22.5% of residents were under the age of 18 and 14.1% of residents were 65 years of age or older. For every 100 females there were 101.6 males, and for every 100 females age 18 and over there were 102.4 males age 18 and over.

0.0% of residents lived in urban areas, while 100.0% lived in rural areas.

There were 1,711 households in Sierra View, of which 35.0% had children under the age of 18 living in them. Of all households, 58.2% were married-couple households, 16.4% were households with a male householder and no spouse or partner present, and 17.5% were households with a female householder and no spouse or partner present. About 18.2% of all households were made up of individuals and 8.1% had someone living alone who was 65 years of age or older.

There were 1,894 housing units, of which 9.7% were vacant. The homeowner vacancy rate was 1.7% and the rental vacancy rate was 6.8%.

Racial composition as of the 2020 census
Race	Number	Percent
White	3,316	67.6%
Black or African American	728	14.8%
American Indian and Alaska Native	13	0.3%
Asian	70	1.4%
Native Hawaiian and Other Pacific Islander	0	0.0%
Some other race	269	5.5%
Two or more races	511	10.4%
Hispanic or Latino (of any race)	799	16.3%

== Education ==
The Chestnuthill Township part is in the Pleasant Valley School District. The Tunkhannock Township part is in the Pocono Mountain School District.
