= The Focus Community Newspaper =

- Type: Weekly newspaper
- Format: Tabloid
- Owner(s): Pauline Roberti (Brotzman) and Denise D'Amico
- Founded: November 1988; 37 years ago
- Language: English
- Headquarters: Brodheadsville, Pennsylvania
- City: Brodheadsville, Pennsylvania
- Country: United States
- Circulation: 25,000
- Free online archives: https://web.archive.org/web/20221208114917/http://www.focuscommunitynewspaper.com/archives.html

The Focus Community Newspaper is a weekly newspaper based in Brodheadsville, Pennsylvania. It serves portions of Monroe, Carbon, Northampton, Lehigh counties in Pennsylvania and Warren County, New Jersey. The Focus has a circulation of 25,000, and its content consists mainly of classified ads, but also includes some community-based articles.

The Focus has been in print since November 1988. In June 1991, it was purchased by Pauline Roberti (Brotzman) and Denise D'Amico, who are current owners.
