= Gilbert, Pennsylvania =

Unincorporated community in Pennsylvania, U.S.

- Unincorporated community
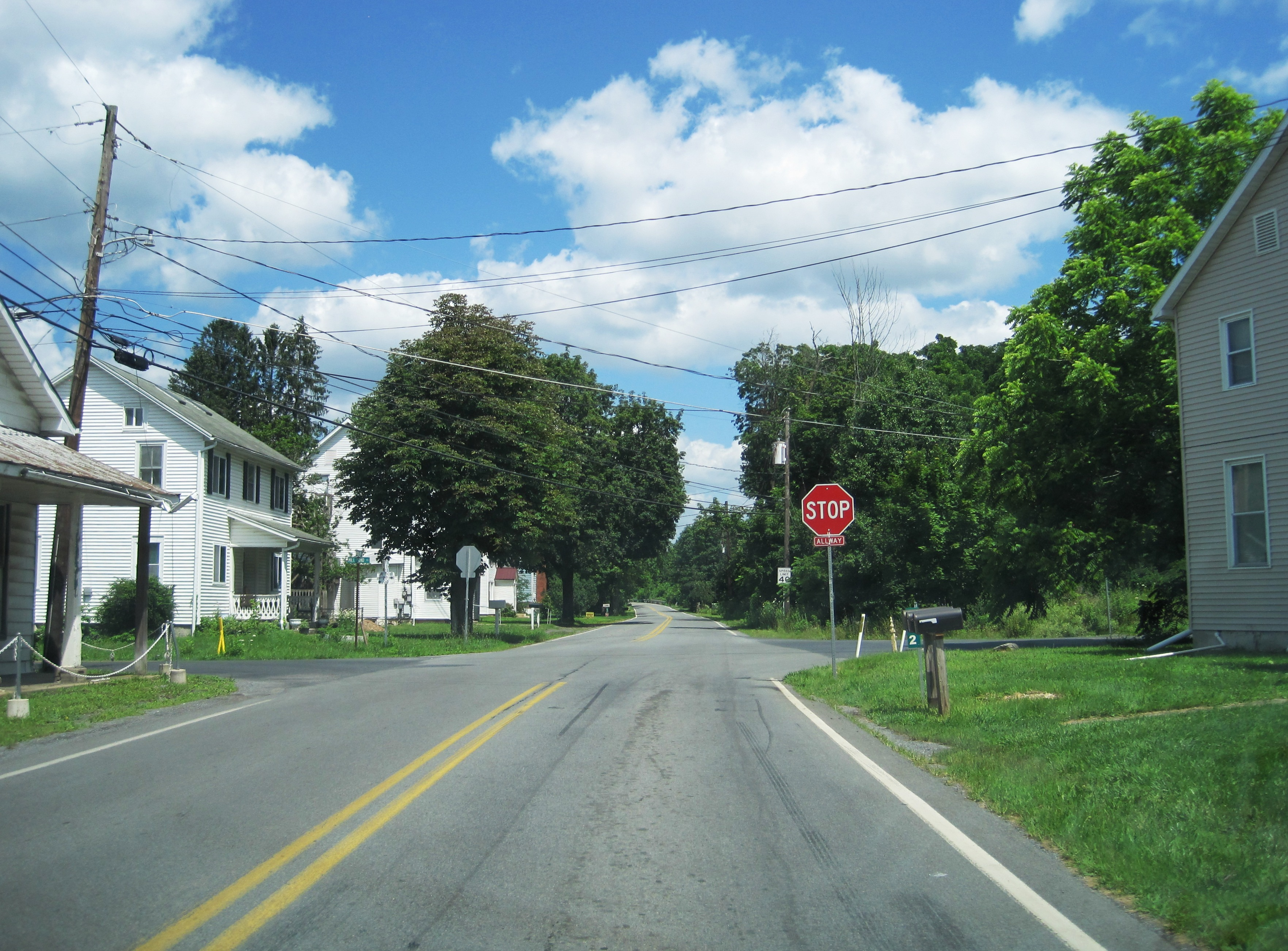
- Gilbert as seen along Weir Mountain Road

- Location within Pennsylvania Location within the United States
- Coordinates: 40°54′57″N 75°26′22″W
- Country: United States
- State: Pennsylvania
- County: Monroe
- Townships: Polk, Chestnuthill

Population (2020)
  - Total: 430
- Time zone: UTC-5 (Eastern (EST))
  - Summer (DST): UTC-4 (EDT)
- ZIP code: 18331
- Area code(s): 610
- GNIS feature ID: 1175600

Gilbert is an unincorporated community in the Polk and Chestnuthill townships in Monroe County, Pennsylvania, United States. The population was 430 in the 2020 census.

The Pohopoco Creek runs southward through Gilbert, then westward through Beltzville Lake to the Lehigh River. Students in the village attend the Pleasant Valley School District.
