= Hamilton Square, Pennsylvania =

Unincorporated community in Pennsylvania, US

- Unincorporated community
- Location within Pennsylvania
- Coordinates: 40°55′28″N 75°17′41″W
- Country: United States
- State: Pennsylvania
- County: Monroe
- Elevation: 574 ft (175 m)
- Time zone: UTC-5 (Eastern (EST))
  - Summer (DST): UTC-4 (EDT)
- Area code: 570
- GNIS feature ID: 1176431

Hamilton Square is an unincorporated community in Hamilton Township, Monroe County, Pennsylvania, United States. Hamilton Square is located near U.S. Route 209 5.2 miles (8.4 km) east of Brodheadsville.
