= Sun Valley, Pennsylvania =

Unincorporated community in Pennsylvania, US

- Census-designated place
- Location within Pennsylvania Location within the United States
- Coordinates: 40°58′55″N 75°27′58″W
- Country: United States
- State: Pennsylvania
- County: Monroe
- Township: Chestnuthill
- Elevation: 1,184 ft (361 m)

Population (2010)
  - Total: 2,399
- Time zone: UTC-5 (Eastern (EST))
  - Summer (DST): UTC-4 (EDT)
- ZIP code: 18330
- Area codes: 570 and 272
- GNIS feature ID: 1189060

Sun Valley is a census-designated place in NW Chestnuthill Township, Pennsylvania on the west side of Route 115 and the south flank of Pohopoco Mountain. The Pohopoco Creek starts in Sun Valley and flows south to Gilbert then west to Beltzville Lake and the Lehigh River. New Jersey Camp Jaycee for people with special needs is located in the CDP, which uses the Effort ZIP code of 18330. As of the 2022 census, the population was 2,206 residents.

== Education ==
It is in the Pleasant Valley School District.
