= Penn Estates, Pennsylvania =

Unincorporated community in Pennsylvania, US

Coordinates: 41°02′11″N 75°14′33″W

- Census-designated place
- Interactive map of Penn Estates, Pennsylvania
- Country: United States
- State: Pennsylvania
- County: Monroe

Area
  - Total: 2.06 sq mi (5.33 km^{2})
  - Land: 2.02 sq mi (5.24 km^{2})
  - Water: 0.035 sq mi (0.09 km^{2})

Population (2020)
  - Total: 4,546
  - Density: 2,248.0/sq mi (867.96/km^{2})
- Time zone: UTC-5 (Eastern (EST))
  - Summer (DST): UTC-4 (EDT)
- ZIP code: 18301
- Area code(s): 570
- FIPS code: 42-58948
- Website: https://www.pepoa.org/

Penn Estates is a census-designated place located in the Stroud and Pocono townships in Monroe County in the state of Pennsylvania. The community is located northwest of the borough of East Stroudsburg. As of the 2020 census the population was 4,493 residents.

== Demographics ==
Historical population
Census	Pop.	Note	%±
2010	4,493		—
2020	4,546		1.2%
U.S. Decennial Census

=== 2020 census ===
As of the 2020 census, Penn Estates had a population of 4,546. The median age was 37.8 years. 25.6% of residents were under the age of 18 and 10.7% of residents were 65 years of age or older. For every 100 females there were 94.5 males, and for every 100 females age 18 and over there were 92.9 males age 18 and over.

100.0% of residents lived in urban areas, while 0.0% lived in rural areas.

There were 1,426 households in Penn Estates, of which 41.6% had children under the age of 18 living in them. Of all households, 57.6% were married-couple households, 12.8% were households with a male householder and no spouse or partner present, and 22.9% were households with a female householder and no spouse or partner present. About 15.1% of all households were made up of individuals and 5.7% had someone living alone who was 65 years of age or older.

There were 1,698 housing units, of which 16.0% were vacant. The homeowner vacancy rate was 2.7% and the rental vacancy rate was 5.8%.

Racial composition as of the 2020 census
Race	Number	Percent
White	1,751	38.5%
Black or African American	1,342	29.5%
American Indian and Alaska Native	39	0.9%
Asian	155	3.4%
Native Hawaiian and Other Pacific Islander	3	0.1%
Some other race	608	13.4%
Two or more races	648	14.3%
Hispanic or Latino (of any race)	1,452	31.9%

== Education ==
The part in Stroud Township is in the Stroudsburg Area School District. The part in Pocono Township is in the Pocono Mountain School District.
