= Arlington Heights, Pennsylvania =

Unincorporated community in Pennsylvania, US

- Census-designated place
- Location of Arlington Heights in Pennsylvania Arlington Heights, Pennsylvania (the United States)
- Coordinates: 41°00′07″N 75°12′28″W
- Country: United States
- State: Pennsylvania
- County: Monroe
- Township: Stroud

Area
  - Total: 5.32 sq mi (13.77 km^{2})
  - Land: 5.31 sq mi (13.74 km^{2})
  - Water: 0.012 sq mi (0.03 km^{2})
- Elevation: 509 ft (155 m)

Population (2020)
  - Total: 6,331
  - Density: 1,193.1/sq mi (460.67/km^{2})
- Time zone: UTC-5 (EST)
  - Summer (DST): UTC-4 (EDT)
- ZIP code: 18360
- Area code(s): 570
- FIPS code: 42-03008

Arlington Heights is a census-designated place (CDP) in Monroe County, Pennsylvania, United States. The population was 6,331 at the 2020 census. One notable location in Arlington Heights is the Stroud Mall.

Arlington Heights is 38.7 miles (62.3 km) northeast of Allentown and 76.7 miles (123.4 km) northwest of New York City.

== Geography ==
Arlington Heights is located at 41°0′7″N 75°12′28″W (41.002024, -75.207766).

According to the United States Census Bureau, the CDP has a total area of 5.3 square miles (14 km^{2}), of which 5.3 square miles (14 km^{2}) is land and 0.04 square miles (0.10 km^{2}) (0.38%) is water.

Arlington Heights is served by exit 303 on Interstate 80. PA 611 serves as the main thoroughfare in the community.

== Demographics ==
Historical population
Census	Pop.	Note	%±
2000	5,132		—
2010	6,333		23.4%
2020	6,331		0.0%
U.S. Decennial Census

As of the census of 2000, there were 5,132 people, 2,055 households, and 1,432 families residing in the CDP. The population density was 972.3 inhabitants per square mile (375.4/km^{2}). There were 2,131 housing units at an average density of 403.7 per square mile (155.9/km^{2}). The racial makeup of the CDP was 90.57% White, 4.38% African American, 0.19% Native American, 1.97% Asian, 1.56% from other races, and 1.33% from two or more races. Hispanic or Latino of any race were 4.50% of the population.

There were 2,055 households, out of which 27.8% had children under the age of 18 living with them, 56.4% were married couples living together, 8.7% had a female householder with no husband present, and 30.3% were non-families. 24.8% of all households were made up of individuals, and 11.6% had someone living alone who was 65 years of age or older. The average household size was 2.50 and the average family size was 2.97.

In the CDP, the population was spread out, with 23.1% under the age of 18, 6.6% from 18 to 24, 25.2% from 25 to 44, 25.9% from 45 to 64, and 19.2% who were 65 years of age or older. The median age was 42 years. For every 100 females, there were 97.6 males. For every 100 females age 18 and over, there were 90.8 males.

The median income for a household in the CDP was $44,111, and the median income for a family was $56,402. Males had a median income of $40,088 versus $25,647 for females. The per capita income for the CDP was $22,831. About 6.6% of families and 8.3% of the population were below the poverty line, including 9.0% of those under age 18 and 5.7% of those age 65 or over.

== Education ==
It is in the Stroudsburg Area School District.
