= Emerald Lakes, Pennsylvania =

Unincorporated community in Pennsylvania, US

Coordinates: 41°04′51″N 75°24′29″W

- Census-designated place
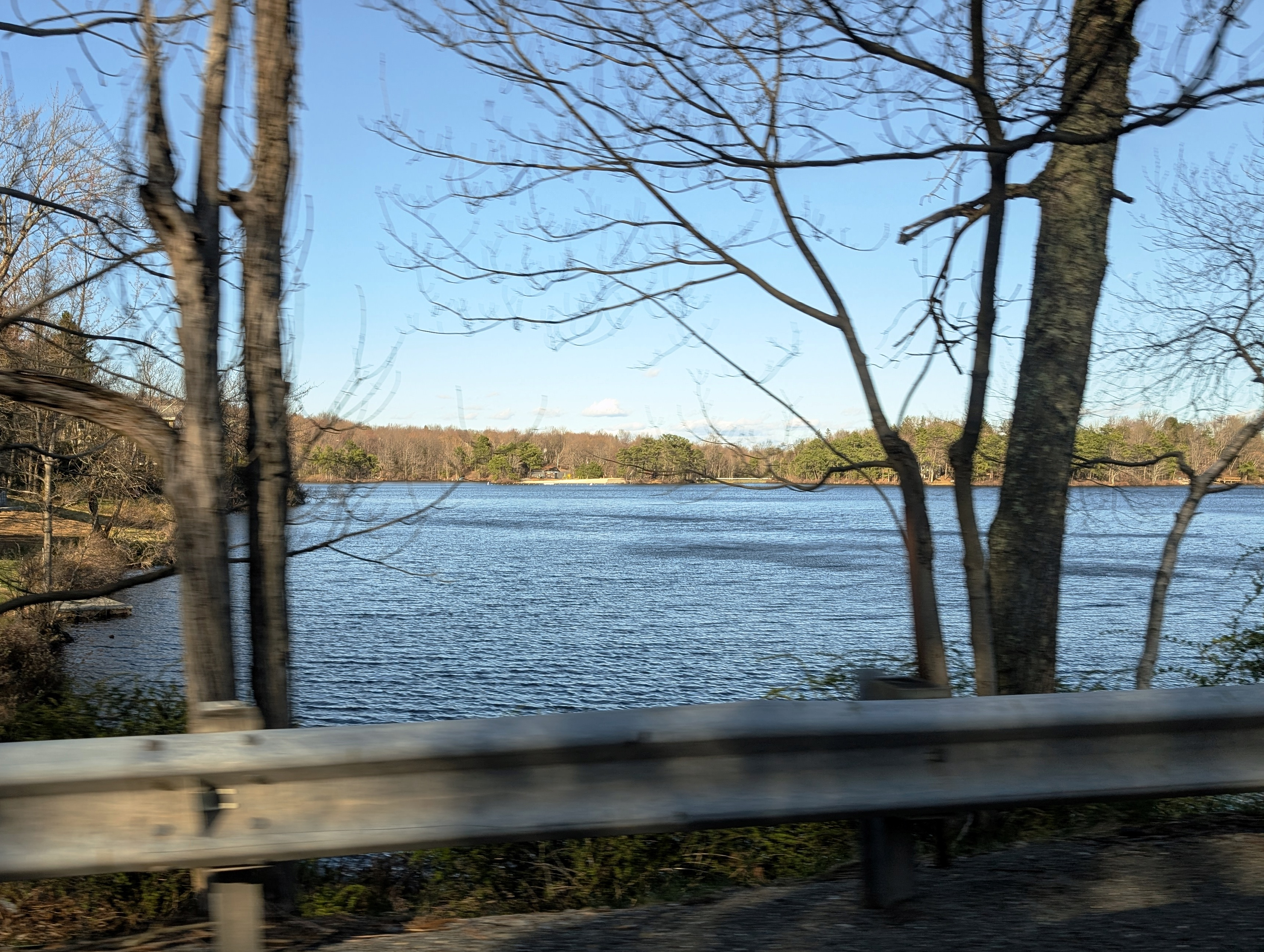
- East Emerald Lake in the CDP of Emerald Lakes
- Interactive map of Emerald Lakes, Pennsylvania
- Country: United States
- State: Pennsylvania
- County: Monroe

Area
  - Total: 3.18 sq mi (8.24 km^{2})
  - Land: 2.98 sq mi (7.71 km^{2})
  - Water: 0.21 sq mi (0.54 km^{2})

Population (2020)
  - Total: 2,895
  - Density: 972.9/sq mi (375.63/km^{2})
- Time zone: UTC-5 (Eastern (EST))
  - Summer (DST): UTC-4 (EDT)
- ZIP code: 18334
- Area codes: 272 and 570
- FIPS code: 42-23540

Emerald Lakes is a census-designated place located in the Tobyhanna and Tunkhannock townships in Monroe County, Pennsylvania. The community is located near Interstates 80 and 380. As of the 2022 American Community Survey, Emerald Lakes was estimated to have 3,228 residents.

== Demographics ==
A small but growing community with a population of just over 3,200 residents as of 2022, projected to surpass 3,300 by 2025. The area is notably diverse, with a racial and ethnic composition that includes sizable White (around 42–54%), Black or African American (16–24%), and Hispanic (24%) populations, alongside smaller Asian, Native American, and multiracial groups. The median age hovers in the early 40s, reflecting a mix of working-age adults, families, and retirees. Residents receive relatively high economic stability, with a median household income of approximately $101,000 and a low poverty rate of around 4%. Educational attainment is strong at the high school level, with over 94% holding a diploma, though fewer, about 12%, have earned a bachelor’s degree or higher. Housing is predominantly owner-occupied (about 85%), with median home values near $260,000, and an average household size of 2.6 people, contributing to a stable, family-oriented suburban atmosphere.

== Education ==
The CDP is in the Pocono Mountain School District.
