= Stroud Township, Pennsylvania =

Township in Pennsylvania, US

Stroud Township
- Township
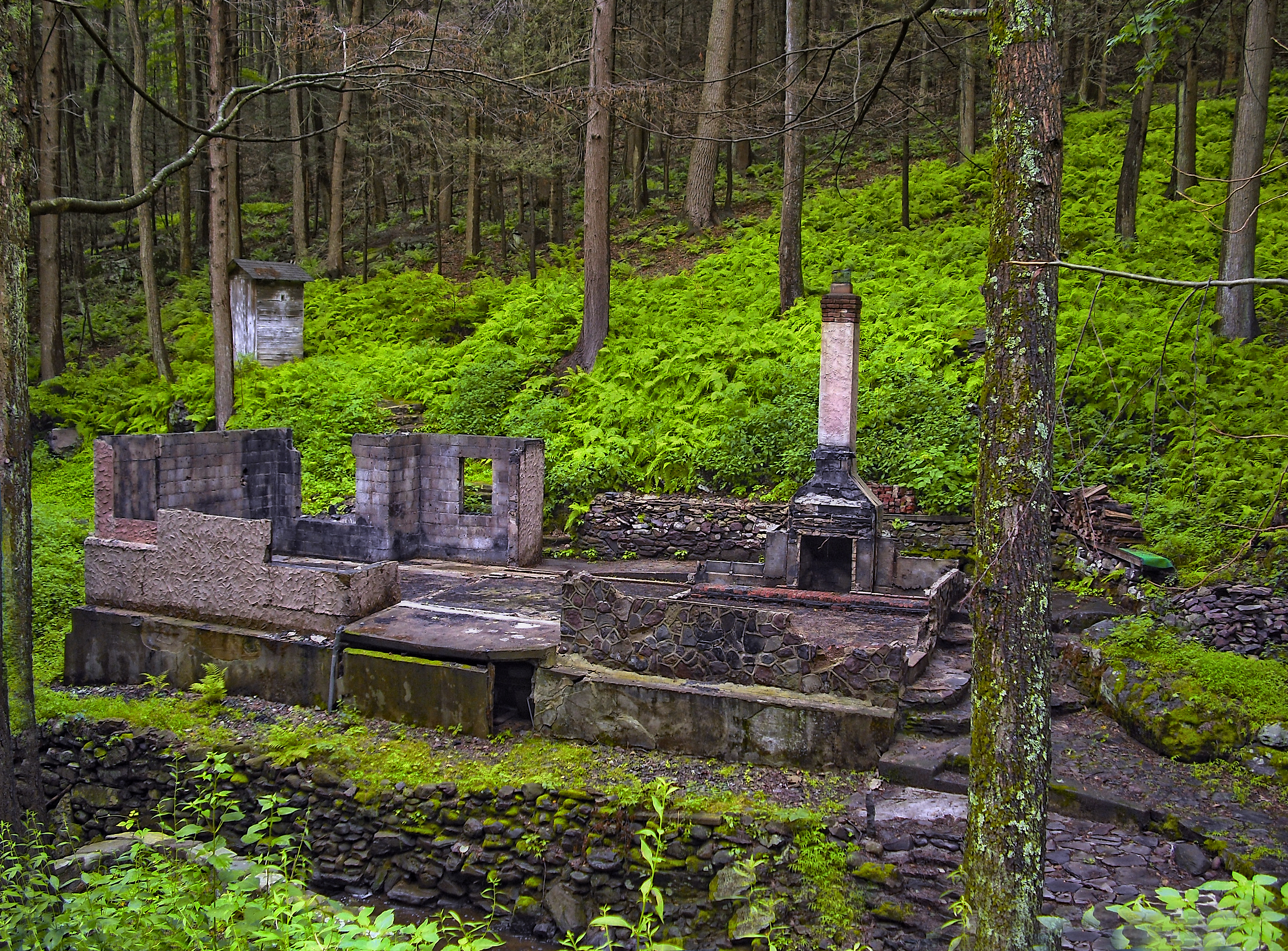
- Roadside abandonment off Pennsylvania Route 191 in Stroud Township

- Seal

- Location of Pennsylvania in the United States
- Coordinates: 40°58′00″N 75°07′28″W
- Country: United States
- State: Pennsylvania
- County: Monroe

Area
  - Total: 31.32 sq mi (81.12 km^{2})
  - Land: 31.06 sq mi (80.44 km^{2})
  - Water: 0.26 sq mi (0.68 km^{2})
- Elevation: 843 ft (257 m)

Population (2020)
  - Total: 19,812 ▲
  - Estimate (2021): 19,944
  - Density: 602/sq mi (232.5/km^{2})
- Time zone: UTC-5 (EST)
  - Summer (DST): UTC-4 (EDT)
- Area code: 570
- FIPS code: 42-089-74880
- Website: stroudtownship.org

Stroud Township is a township in Monroe County, Pennsylvania, United States. As of 2020, the township had an estimated population of 19,812.

== Geography ==
According to the United States Census Bureau, the township has a total area of 31.5 square miles (81.5 km^{2}), of which 31.2 square miles (80.8 km^{2}) is land and 0.3 square mile (0.7 km^{2}) (0.86%) is water. It contains the census-designated place of Arlington Heights and part of Penn Estates.

== Demographics ==
Historical population
Census	Pop.	Note	%±
2000	13,978		—
2010	19,213		37.5%
2020	19,812		3.1%
2021 (est.)	19,944		0.7%
U.S. Decennial Census

As of the census of 2000, there were 13,978 people, 5,174 households, and 3,880 families residing in the township. The population density was 448.2 inhabitants per square mile (173.1/km^{2}). There were 5,935 housing units at an average density of 190.3 per square mile (73.5/km^{2}). The racial makeup of the township was 86.33% White, 6.87% African American, 0.19% Native American, 1.66% Asian, 0.01% Pacific Islander, 2.90% from other races, and 2.05% from two or more races. Hispanic or Latino of any race were 7.36% of the population.

There were 5,174 households, out of which 34.1% had children under the age of 18 living with them, 62.7% were married couples living together, 8.1% had a female householder with no husband present, and 25.0% were non-families. 19.8% of all households were made up of individuals, and 8.5% had someone living alone who was 65 years of age or older. The average household size was 2.69 and the average family size was 3.10.

In the township the population was spread out, with 25.8% under the age of 18, 6.3% from 18 to 24, 27.4% from 25 to 44, 26.4% from 45 to 64, and 14.2% who were 65 years of age or older. The median age was 39 years. For every 100 females, there were 97.1 males. For every 100 females age 18 and over, there were 93.2 males.

The median income for a household in the township was $53,428, and the median income for a family was $61,349. Males had a median income of $44,621 versus $27,065 for females. The per capita income for the township was $23,460. About 5.9% of families and 7.1% of the population were below the poverty line, including 8.0% of those under age 18 and 5.1% of those age 65 or over.

United States presidential election results for Stroud Township, Pennsylvania
Year	Republican		Democratic		Third party(ies)	
Year	No.	%	No.	%	No.	%
2024	4,246	41.81%	5,772	56.84%	137	1.35%
2020	3,876	38.07%	6,187	60.78%	117	1.15%
2016	3,391	39.79%	4,833	56.71%	298	3.50%
2012	2,887	37.40%	4,760	61.67%	72	0.93%
2008	3,143	37.31%	5,197	61.70%	83	0.99%
2004	3,415	47.67%	3,720	51.93%	29	0.40%
2000	2,707	49.16%	2,628	47.72%	172	3.12%

== Climate ==
According to the Trewartha climate classification system, Stroud Township has a Temperate Continental climate (Dc) with warm summers (b), cold winters (o) and year-around precipitation (Dcbo). Dcbo climates are characterized by at least one month having an average mean temperature ≤ 32.0 °F (0.0 °C), four to seven months with an average mean temperature ≥ 50.0 °F (10.0 °C), all months with an average mean temperature < 72.0 °F (22.2 °C) and no significant precipitation difference between seasons. Although most summer days are slightly humid in Stroud Township, episodes of heat and high humidity can occur with heat index values > 100 °F (38 °C). Since 1981, the highest air temperature was 99.6 °F (37.6 °C) on July 22, 2011, and the highest daily average mean dew point was 72.3 °F (22.4 °C), on August 28, 2018. July is the peak month for thunderstorm activity, which correlates with the average warmest month of the year. The average wettest month is September, which correlates with tropical storm remnants during the peak of the Atlantic hurricane season. Since 1981, the wettest calendar day was 6.11 inches (155 mm) on October 8, 2005. During the winter months, the plant hardiness zone is 6a, with an average annual extreme minimum air temperature of −7.1 °F (−21.7 °C). Since 1981, the coldest air temperature was −18.7 °F (−28.2 °C) on January 21, 1994. Episodes of extreme cold and wind can occur with wind chill values < −19 °F (−28 °C). The average snowiest month is January, which correlates with the average coldest month of the year. Ice storms and large snowstorms depositing ≥ 12 inches (30 cm) of snow occur once every couple of years, particularly during nor’easters from December through March.

Climate data for Stroud Twp, Elevation 715 ft (218 m), 1981-2010 normals, extremes 1981-2018
Month	Jan	Feb	Mar	Apr	May	Jun	Jul	Aug	Sep	Oct	Nov	Dec	Year
Record high °F (°C)	67.7 (19.8)	76.4 (24.7)	85.7 (29.8)	93.6 (34.2)	94.0 (34.4)	94.6 (34.8)	99.6 (37.6)	98.2 (36.8)	95.7 (35.4)	87.4 (30.8)	78.7 (25.9)	70.4 (21.3)	99.6 (37.6)
Mean daily maximum °F (°C)	35.2 (1.8)	38.9 (3.8)	47.9 (8.8)	60.7 (15.9)	71.1 (21.7)	79.2 (26.2)	83.1 (28.4)	81.7 (27.6)	74.5 (23.6)	62.9 (17.2)	51.5 (10.8)	39.5 (4.2)	60.6 (15.9)
Daily mean °F (°C)	26.2 (−3.2)	29.0 (−1.7)	37.2 (2.9)	48.5 (9.2)	58.5 (14.7)	67.2 (19.6)	71.6 (22.0)	70.1 (21.2)	62.8 (17.1)	51.2 (10.7)	41.6 (5.3)	31.1 (−0.5)	49.7 (9.8)
Mean daily minimum °F (°C)	17.2 (−8.2)	19.2 (−7.1)	26.4 (−3.1)	36.2 (2.3)	46.0 (7.8)	55.3 (12.9)	60.0 (15.6)	58.6 (14.8)	51.0 (10.6)	39.4 (4.1)	31.7 (−0.2)	22.7 (−5.2)	38.7 (3.7)
Record low °F (°C)	−18.7 (−28.2)	−9.3 (−22.9)	−0.6 (−18.1)	13.8 (−10.1)	27.3 (−2.6)	35.9 (2.2)	41.9 (5.5)	37.3 (2.9)	29.5 (−1.4)	19.0 (−7.2)	5.0 (−15.0)	−8.1 (−22.3)	−18.7 (−28.2)
Average precipitation inches (mm)	3.45 (88)	3.01 (76)	3.66 (93)	4.17 (106)	4.46 (113)	4.56 (116)	4.53 (115)	4.42 (112)	5.00 (127)	4.80 (122)	4.04 (103)	4.13 (105)	50.23 (1,276)
Average snowfall inches (cm)	12.9 (33)	9.2 (23)	9.6 (24)	2.3 (5.8)	0.0 (0.0)	0.0 (0.0)	0.0 (0.0)	0.0 (0.0)	0.0 (0.0)	0.1 (0.25)	2.4 (6.1)	7.7 (20)	44.3 (113)
Average relative humidity (%)	69.9	64.7	60.0	57.1	61.5	68.8	68.8	71.6	72.7	70.4	69.3	71.3	67.2
Average dew point °F (°C)	17.7 (−7.9)	18.6 (−7.4)	24.6 (−4.1)	34.0 (1.1)	45.3 (7.4)	56.6 (13.7)	60.8 (16.0)	60.5 (15.8)	53.9 (12.2)	41.9 (5.5)	32.3 (0.2)	22.9 (−5.1)	39.2 (4.0)
Source: PRISM

== Transportation ==
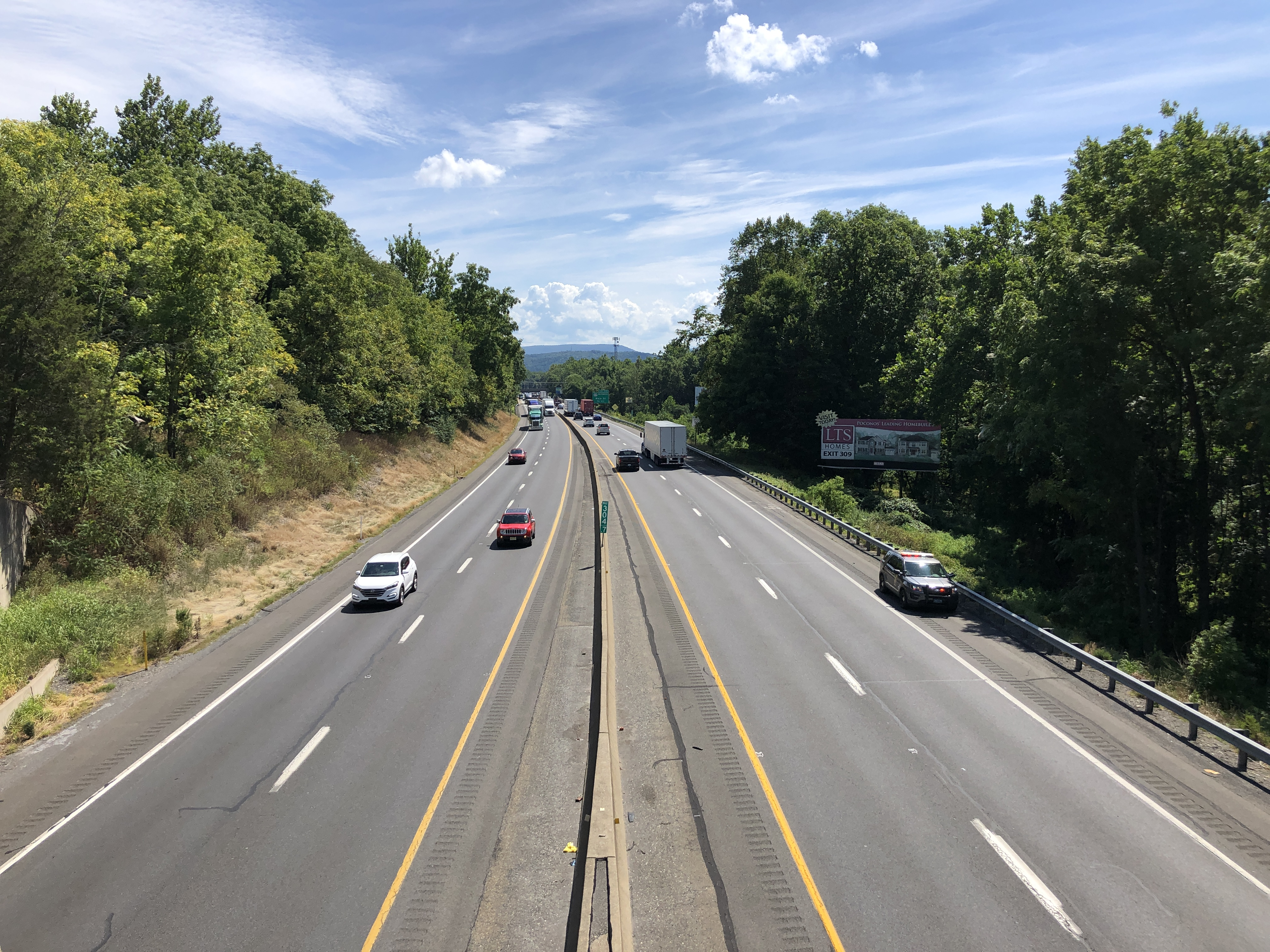
I-80 eastbound in Stroud Township

As of 2019, there were 135.56 miles (218.16 km) of public roads in Stroud Township, of which 48.80 miles (78.54 km) were maintained by the Pennsylvania Department of Transportation (PennDOT) and 86.76 miles (139.63 km) were maintained by the township.

Interstate 80 is the most prominent highway serving Stroud Township. It follows the Keystone Shortway along an east-west alignment through the western and central portions of the township. U.S. Route 209 follows a southwest-northeast alignment through the township, becoming concurrent with I-80 in the middle of the township. U.S. Route 209 Business follows Main Street along a southwest-northeast alignment in the southwestern and central portion of the township. Pennsylvania Route 191 follows a north-south alignment through the middle of the township. Pennsylvania Route 447 follows a southeast-northwest alignment across the northeastern portion of the township, becoming concurrent with PA 191 in the northern part of the township. Pennsylvania Route 611 follows an southeast-northwest alignment through the middle of the township. Finally, Pennsylvania Route 33 briefly enters the western portion of the township before ending at PA 611.

== Ecology ==
According to the A. W. Kuchler U.S. potential natural vegetation types, Stroud Township would have a dominant vegetation type of Appalachian Oak (104) with a dominant vegetation form of Eastern Hardwood Forest (25). The peak spring bloom typically occurs in late-April and peak fall color usually occurs in mid-October. The plant hardiness zone is 6a with an average annual extreme minimum air temperature of −7.1 °F (−21.7 °C).

== Notable natives ==
- John Summerfield Staples (1845–1888), "Substitute" soldier for President Abraham Lincoln in the Union Army during the American Civil War.
