= Long Pond, Pennsylvania =

Unincorporated community in Pennsylvania, US

- Unincorporated community
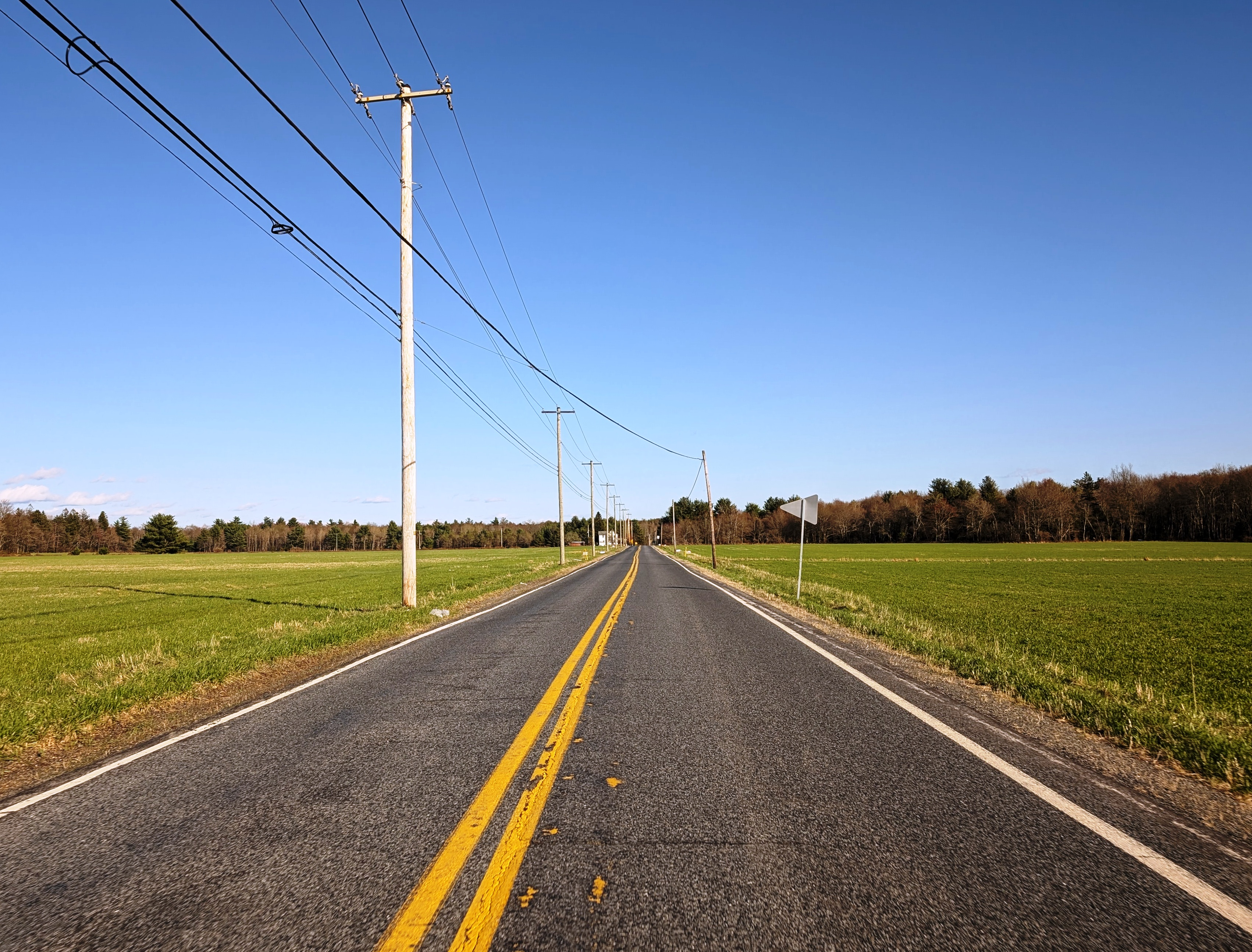
- Long Pond Road eastbound through Long Pond

- Location within Pennsylvania Location within the United States
- Coordinates: 41°03′12″N 75°27′47″W
- Country: United States
- State: Pennsylvania
- County: Monroe
- Township: Tunkhannock
- Elevation: 1,873 ft (571 m)
- Time zone: UTC-5 (Eastern (EST))
  - Summer (DST): UTC-4 (EDT)
- ZIP code: 18334
- Area codes: 570 and 272
- GNIS feature ID: 1204053

Long Pond is an unincorporated community in Tunkhannock Township, Monroe County, Pennsylvania. It is part of the Pocono Mountains region of Pennsylvania, a part of the Appalachian Mountains. Long Pond is located within the Tunkhannock Creek Watershed. Its ZIP code is 18334.

== Geography ==
Long Pond is named after the wetland topography formed by Tunkhannock Creek. Within the Long Pond community are public access lands, containing many species of plants and animals. Long Pond has been called "the most unique inland freshwater wetland in the state".

The climate of Long Pond is variable, and ecosystems vary considerably. Ecosystems range from glacial till barrens habitat, known for frost pockets and unique species and associated insects. Mixed hardwood deciduous forests and vast peat bog swamps. Frost pockets can occur in this region in typically frost free months of June, July, and August.

== Demographics ==
Long Pond is a sparsely populated, rural area. It has a population of about 7,000 people, and the demographics are approximately: 54.6% Caucasian/White, 26.4% African American, 5% Asian, and 13% Hispanic. At $180,000, the average home value here is a bit higher than average. The median age is 39. The median age for men is 38 while for women the median age is 40.

== Economy ==
Economically, Long Pond is primarily known as the location of Pocono Raceway, a track which hosts an annual NASCAR Cup Series race, The Great American Getaway 400, in July, and other events. The track formerly hosted a second NASCAR Cup Series race, the Pocono Organics CBD 325, and an IndyCar race, the Pocono 500.

In July 1972, the Concert 10 rock festival brought thousands to Long Pond. Edgar Winter, Three Dog Night, the Faces featuring Rod Stewart, and others performed during the two day festival.

Long Pond hosts an annual electronic music showcase called Elements Music and Arts Festival.
