= Tunkhannock Township, Monroe County, Pennsylvania =

Township in Pennsylvania, US

Tunkhannock Township
- Township
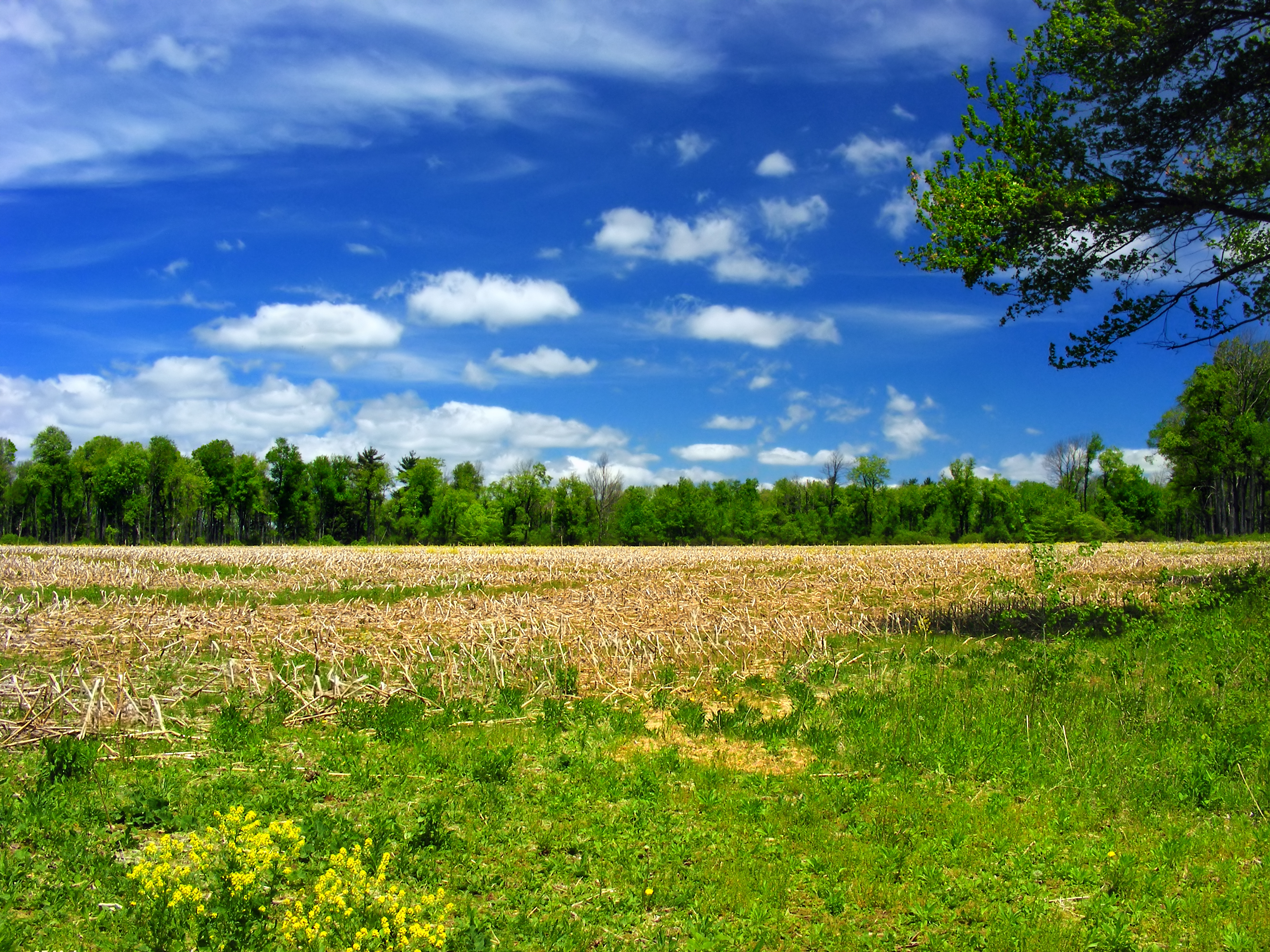
- Fields and woods in the township

- Seal

- Location of Tunkhannock Township in Monroe County

- Pennsylvania
- Coordinates: 40°59′59″N 75°30′04″W
- Country: United States
- State: Pennsylvania
- County: Monroe

Area
  - Total: 38.83 sq mi (100.58 km^{2})
  - Land: 38.54 sq mi (99.83 km^{2})
  - Water: 0.29 sq mi (0.75 km^{2})
- Elevation: 1,841 ft (561 m)

Population (2020)
  - Total: 7,037 ▲
  - Estimate (2021): 7,041
  - Density: 172.6/sq mi (66.63/km^{2})
- Time zone: UTC-5 (EST)
  - Summer (DST): UTC-4 (EDT)
- Area code(s): 570
- FIPS code: 42-089-77776
- Website: longpondpa.com

Tunkhannock Township is a township in Monroe County, Pennsylvania, United States. The population was 6,960 in 2025. Tunkhannock Township comprises the communities of Blakeslee and Long Pond. The most noteworthy feature of this township is the Tunkhannock creek, which forms "Long Pond", and is designated by the PA DEP as an Exceptional Value Waters (EV). The Bethlehem Authority, Nature Conservancy, Wildlands Conservancy, County of Monroe Open Space Program, and the PA Department of Forest and Waters have protected thousands of acres. Tunkhannock Township is home to many species of globally rare, threatened, and endangered plants and animals and has been described as one of the last "great places".

In Long Pond National Diversity Inventory found 35 rare, threatened or endangered species or ecological communities. The butterfly community and collection of rare plants found in Long Pond "likely represent the best assemblage of rare and unusual species of any site or habitat in Pennsylvania," making Long Pond one of the most distinctive natural areas in the Northeast US.

== Geography ==
According to the United States Census Bureau, the township has a total area of 38.9 square miles (100.9 km^{2}), of which 38.6 square miles (100.1 km^{2}) is land and 0.3 square miles (0.8 km^{2}) (0.80%) is water. It contains parts of the census-designated places of Emerald Lakes, Indian Mountain Lake, and Sierra View.

== Demographics ==
Historical population
| Census | Pop. | Note | %± |
|---|---|---|---|
| 2000 | 4,983 | | — |
| 2010 | 6,789 | | 36.2% |
| 2020 | 7,037 | | 3.7% |
| 2021 (est.) | 7,041 | | 0.1% |
U.S. Decennial Census

At the 2000 census, there were 4,983 people, 1,661 households and 1,333 families residing in the township. The population density was 129.0 inhabitants per square mile (49.8/km^{2}). There were 2,967 housing units at an average density of 76.8 per square mile (29.7/km^{2}). The racial makeup of the township was 86.49% White, 7.06% African American, 0.24% Native American, 0.94% Asian, 0.02% Pacific Islander, 2.39% from other races, and 2.85% from two or more races. Hispanic or Latino of any race were 9.47% of the population.

There were 1,661 households, of which 41.9% had children under the age of 18 living with them, 67.9% were married couples living together, 7.8% had a female householder with no husband present, and 19.7% were non-families. 15.4% of all households were made up of individuals, and 4.6% had someone living alone who was 65 years of age or older. The average household size was 3.00 and the average family size was 3.35.

31.5% of the population were under the age of 18, 6.2% from 18 to 24, 31.5% from 25 to 44, 21.4% from 45 to 64, and 9.4% who were 65 years of age or older. The median age was 36 years. For every 100 females, there were 103.0 males. For every 100 females age 18 and over, there were 100.1 males.

The median household income was $42,448 and the median family income was $46,996. Males had a median income of $38,669 compared with $23,986 for females. The per capita income for the township was $15,927. About 10.3% of families and 13.5% of the population were below the poverty line, including 18.6% of those under age 18 and 8.5% of those age 65 or over.

United States presidential election results for Tunkhannock Township, Monroe County, Pennsylvania
| Year | Republican | | Democratic | | Third party(ies) | |
| Year | No. | % | No. | % | No. | % |
|---|---|---|---|---|---|---|
| 2024 | 1,675 | 51.57% | 1,547 | 47.63% | 26 | 0.80% |
| 2020 | 1,522 | 47.19% | 1,645 | 51.01% | 58 | 1.80% |
| 2016 | 1,177 | 48.36% | 1,188 | 48.81% | 69 | 2.83% |
| 2012 | 941 | 40.16% | 1,375 | 58.69% | 27 | 1.15% |
| 2008 | 915 | 38.59% | 1,438 | 60.65% | 18 | 0.76% |
| 2004 | 722 | 50.63% | 697 | 48.88% | 7 | 0.49% |
| 2000 | 727 | 51.38% | 650 | 45.94% | 38 | 2.69% |

== Climate ==
According to the Trewartha climate classification system, Tunkhannock Township has a Temperate continental climate (Dc) with warm summers (b), cold winters (o) and year-around precipitation (Dcbo). Dcbo climates are characterized by at least one month having an average mean temperature ≤ 32.0 °F (0.0 °C), four to seven months with an average mean temperature ≥ 50.0 °F (10.0 °C), all months with an average mean temperature < 72.0 °F (22.2 °C) and no significant precipitation difference between seasons. Although most summer days are comfortably humid in Tunkhannock Township, episodes of heat and high humidity can occur, with heat index values > 92 °F (33 °C). Since 1981, the highest air temperature has been 94.1 °F (34.5 °C) July 22, 2011, and the highest daily average mean dew point was 70.8 °F (21.6 °C) on August 1, 2006. July is the peak month for thunderstorm activity, which correlates with the average warmest month of the year. Since 1981, the wettest calendar day has been 6.66 inches (169 mm) on September 30, 2010. During the winter months, the plant hardiness zone is 5b with an average annual extreme minimum air temperature of −10.3 °F (−23.5 °C). Since 1981, the coldest air temperature has been −22.7 °F (−30.4 °C) on January 21, 1994. Episodes of extreme cold and wind can occur with wind chill values < −23 °F (−31 °C). The average snowiest month is January which correlates with the average coldest month of the year. Ice storms and large snowstorms depositing ≥ 12 inches (30 cm) of snow occur nearly every year, particularly during nor'easters from December through March.

Climate data for Tunkhannock Twp, Elevation 1,874 ft (571 m), 1981-2010 normals, extremes 1981-2018
| Month | Jan | Feb | Mar | Apr | May | Jun | Jul | Aug | Sep | Oct | Nov | Dec | Year |
|---|---|---|---|---|---|---|---|---|---|---|---|---|---|
| Record high °F (°C) | 61.9 (16.6) | 71.9 (22.2) | 80.7 (27.1) | 86.9 (30.5) | 89.0 (31.7) | 88.9 (31.6) | 94.1 (34.5) | 91.9 (33.3) | 89.6 (32.0) | 82.2 (27.9) | 74.0 (23.3) | 66.0 (18.9) | 94.1 (34.5) |
| Mean daily maximum °F (°C) | 30.9 (−0.6) | 34.3 (1.3) | 42.6 (5.9) | 55.3 (12.9) | 66.3 (19.1) | 73.9 (23.3) | 78.3 (25.7) | 76.4 (24.7) | 69.6 (20.9) | 57.8 (14.3) | 47.1 (8.4) | 35.2 (1.8) | 55.7 (13.2) |
| Daily mean °F (°C) | 22.9 (−5.1) | 25.7 (−3.5) | 33.3 (0.7) | 44.8 (7.1) | 55.5 (13.1) | 63.6 (17.6) | 68.2 (20.1) | 66.7 (19.3) | 59.9 (15.5) | 48.4 (9.1) | 38.8 (3.8) | 27.6 (−2.4) | 46.4 (8.0) |
| Mean daily minimum °F (°C) | 15.0 (−9.4) | 17.1 (−8.3) | 23.9 (−4.5) | 34.3 (1.3) | 44.6 (7.0) | 53.3 (11.8) | 58.0 (14.4) | 57.0 (13.9) | 50.1 (10.1) | 39.0 (3.9) | 30.5 (−0.8) | 20.1 (−6.6) | 37.0 (2.8) |
| Record low °F (°C) | −22.7 (−30.4) | −12.5 (−24.7) | −5.4 (−20.8) | 11.0 (−11.7) | 27.5 (−2.5) | 33.5 (0.8) | 38.7 (3.7) | 35.1 (1.7) | 28.7 (−1.8) | 18.0 (−7.8) | 0.3 (−17.6) | −13.6 (−25.3) | −22.7 (−30.4) |
| Average precipitation inches (mm) | 4.33 (110) | 3.62 (92) | 4.56 (116) | 4.86 (123) | 4.63 (118) | 4.90 (124) | 5.12 (130) | 4.66 (118) | 5.21 (132) | 5.68 (144) | 5.12 (130) | 5.04 (128) | 57.73 (1,466) |
| Average snowfall inches (cm) | 19.7 (50) | 14.1 (36) | 14.6 (37) | 3.5 (8.9) | 0.0 (0.0) | 0.0 (0.0) | 0.0 (0.0) | 0.0 (0.0) | 0.0 (0.0) | 0.1 (0.25) | 3.7 (9.4) | 11.8 (30) | 67.5 (171) |
| Average relative humidity (%) | 72.6 | 67.7 | 63.6 | 59.9 | 62.3 | 71.5 | 70.9 | 73.9 | 73.5 | 70.4 | 70.4 | 74.0 | 69.2 |
| Average dew point °F (°C) | 15.4 (−9.2) | 16.5 (−8.6) | 22.3 (−5.4) | 31.7 (−0.2) | 42.8 (6.0) | 54.2 (12.3) | 58.4 (14.7) | 58.1 (14.5) | 51.4 (10.8) | 39.2 (4.0) | 30.0 (−1.1) | 20.4 (−6.4) | 36.8 (2.7) |
Source: PRISM

== Transportation ==
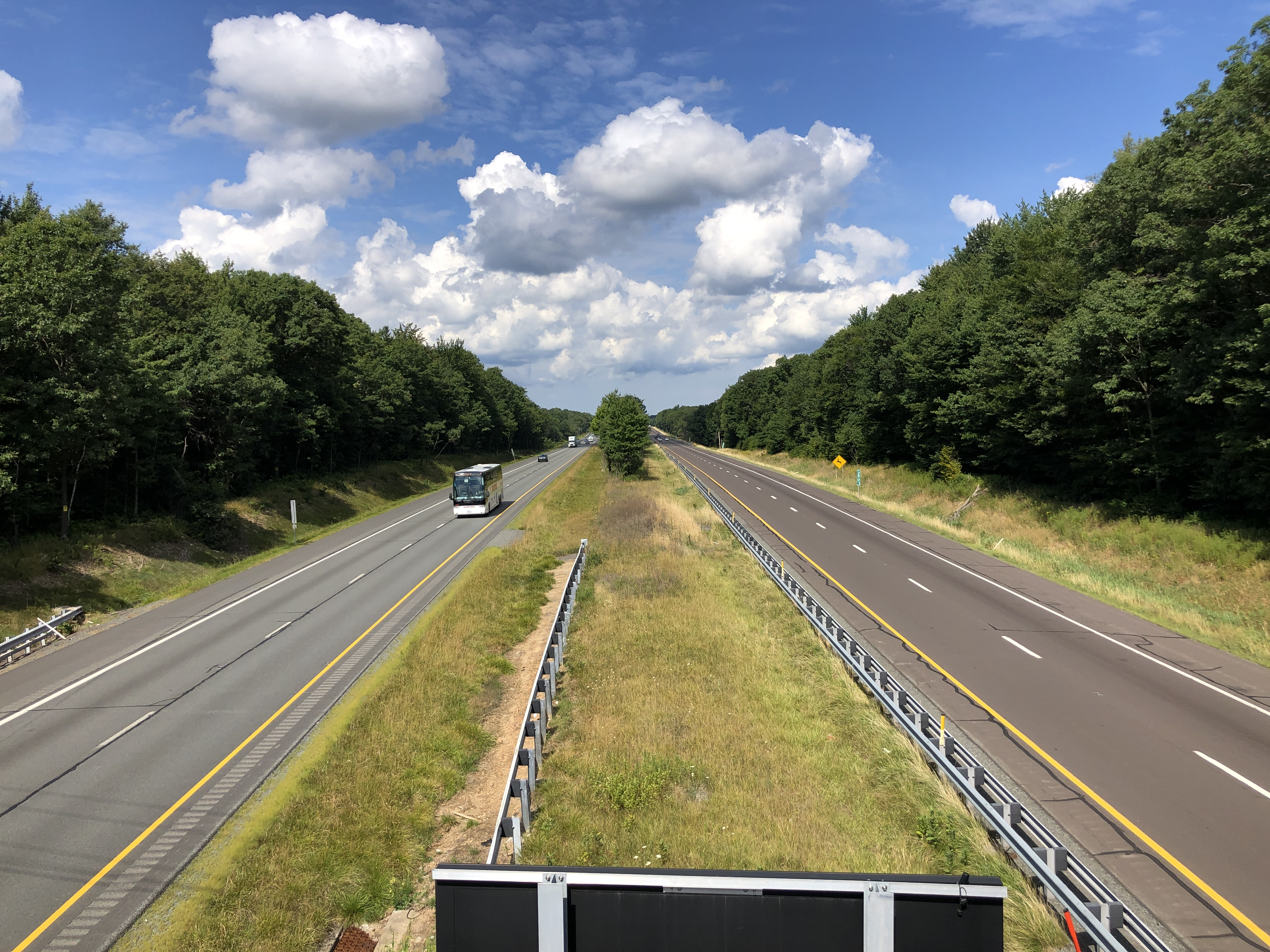
I-80 westbound in Tunkhannock Township

As of 2020, there were 52.66 miles (84.75 km) of public roads in Tunkhannock Township, of which 25.23 miles (40.60 km) were maintained by the Pennsylvania Department of Transportation (PennDOT) and 27.43 miles (44.14 km) were maintained by the township.

Interstate 80 is the most prominent highway traversing Tunkhannock Township. It follows an east-west alignment across the northern portion of the township, including part of the interchange with Interstate 380, but the nearest interchanges with local roads are in neighboring townships. Pennsylvania Route 115 is the main numbered highway providing direct local access to the township. It follows a southeast-northwest alignment across southern and western parts of the township. Pennsylvania Route 903 begins at PA 115 in the western corner of the township and heads southwestward out of the township.

== Ecology ==
According to the A. W. Kuchler U.S. potential natural vegetation types, Tunkhannock Township would have a dominant vegetation type of Northern Hardwood (106) with a dominant vegetation form of Northern hardwood forest (26). The peak spring bloom typically occurs in early-May and peak fall color usually occurs in early-October. The plant hardiness zone is 5b with an average annual extreme minimum air temperature of −10.3 °F (−23.5 °C).

The climate of Long Pond is variable, and ecosystems vary considerably. Ecosystems range from glacial till barrens habitat, known for frost pockets and globally rare flowering species and associated insects. Mixed hardwood deciduous forests and vast peat bog swamps. Frost pockets can occur in this region in typically frost free months of June, July, and August.

The Nature Conservancy and Bethlehem Municipal Water Authority have preserved large tracts of habitat for globally rare species in this and neighboring townships.
