= Stroudsburg Area School District =

School district in Pennsylvania

Coordinates: 40.98426°N 75.20744°W

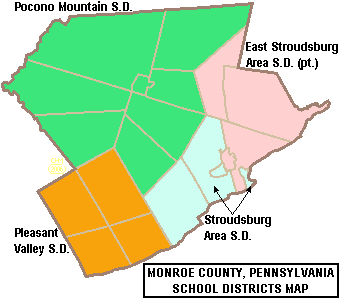

Address
- 123 Linden Street Stroudsburg, Monroe County, Pennsylvania, 18360; United States

District information
- Type: Public
- Grades: K–12
- Schools: Stroudsburg High School and six others
- Budget: $119.8 million
- NCES District ID: 4222860

Students and staff
- Students: 4,464 (as of 2023-24)
- Teachers: 350.32 (on an FTE basis)
- Student–teacher ratio: 12.74
- Athletic conference: Eastern Pennsylvania Conference
- District mascot: Mountaineers
- Colors: Maroon and white

Other information
- Website: www.sburg.org

Stroudsburg Area School District is a large, suburban/rural public school district located in the Pocono Mountains in Northeastern Pennsylvania, United States. The headquarters are located on West Main Street in Stroudsburg, Pennsylvania. Stroudsburg Area School District encompasses approximately 73 square miles (190 km^{2}).

As of the 2023–24 school year, the district had 4,464 students across all of its schools and 350.32 teachers on a full-time employee basis for a student-teacher ratio of 12.73, according to National Center for Education Statistics data.

According to 2000 federal census data, it served a resident population of 30,713. By 2010, the district's population increased to 36,502 people, and by 2015 declined to 35,787. In 2009, the district residents' per capita income was $22,137, while the median family income was $56,546. In Pennsylvania, the median family income was $49,501 and the United States median family income was $49,445, in 2010. The district is one of the 500 public school districts of Pennsylvania.

According to the Pennsylvania Budget and Policy Center, 44.1% of the district's pupils lived at 185% or below the Federal Poverty Level as shown by their eligibility for the federal free or reduced price school meal programs in 2012. In 2013 the Pennsylvania Department of Education, reported that 60 students in the Stroudsburg Area School District were homeless.

== Schools ==
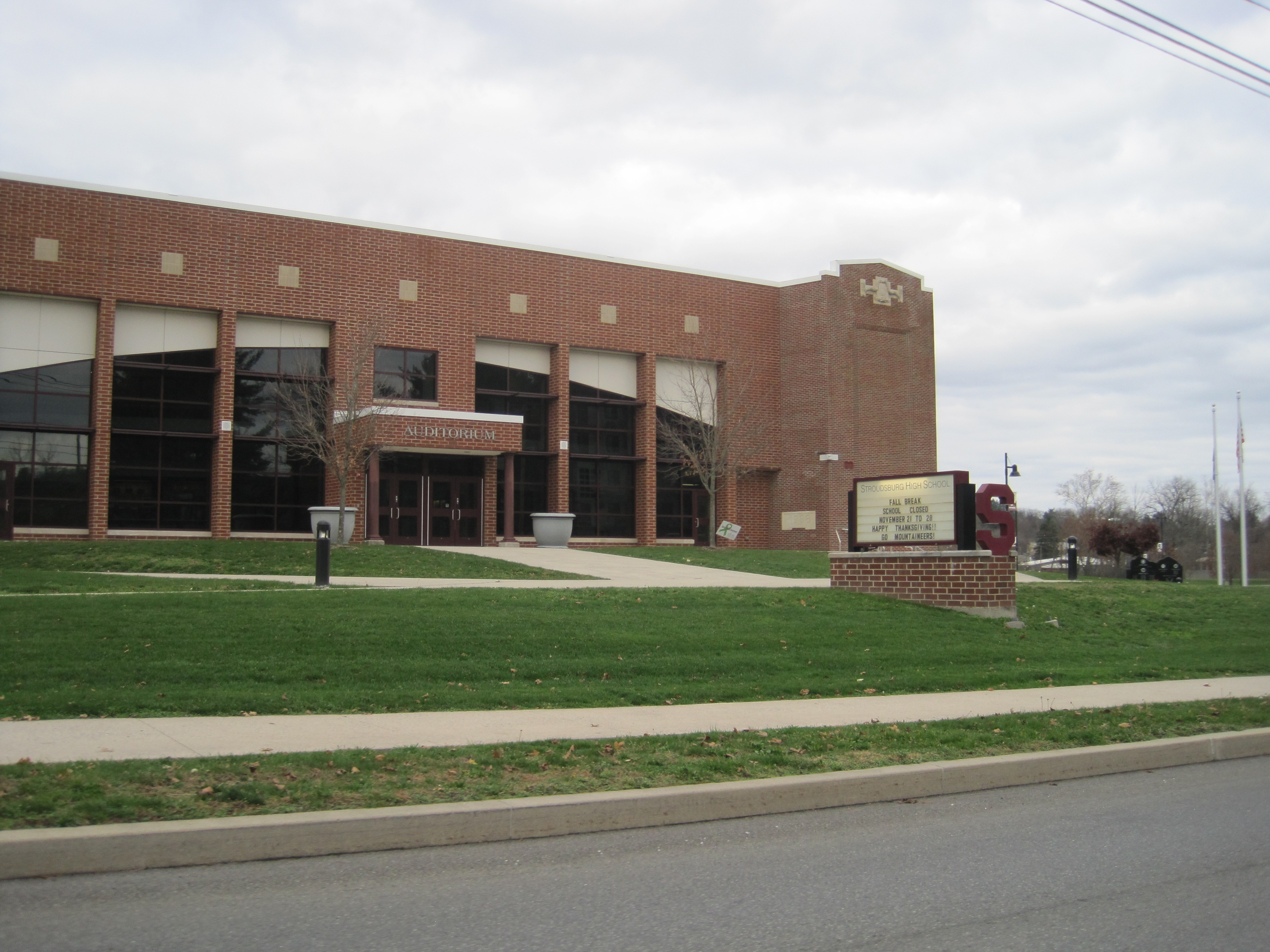
Stroudsburg High School in November 2022

The Stroudsburg Area School District consists of five elementary schools, an intermediate elementary school, a middle school, a junior high, and a high school. There are four elementary principals as well as one at each of the other four school buildings. The intermediate school has one assistant principal, junior high 1.5 assistant principals, and the high school has three assistant principals.

- B.F. Morey Elementary
- Hamilton Township Elementary
- Arlington Heights Elementary
- Chipperfield Elementary School
- Stroudsburg Middle School
- Stroudsburg Junior High School
- Stroudsburg High School

Stroudsburg High School students may choose to attend Monroe Career & Tech Institute for training in the trades. The Colonial Intermediate Unit IU20 provides the district with a wide variety of services like specialized education for disabled students and hearing, speech and visual disability services and professional development for staff and faculty.

W.H. Ramsey Elementary was closed by the school board due to declining enrollment district-wide, effective June 2014, followed by Clearview Elementary the following year.

== Extracurriculars ==
=== Sports ===
The district funds:

Varsity

Boys

- Baseball - AAAA
- Basketball- AAAA
- Cross country - AAA
- Football - AAAA
- Golf - AAA
- Rifle - AAAA
- Soccer - AAA
- Swimming and diving - AAA
- Tennis - AAA
- Track and field - AAA
- Wrestling - AAA

Girls

- Basketball - AAAA
- Cheer - AAAA
- Cross country - AAA
- Field hockey - AAA
- Rifle - AAA
- Soccer - AAA
- Softball - AAAA
- Swimming and diving - AAA
- Tennis - AAA
- Track and field - AAA
- Volleyball - AAA

Junior high middle school sports

Boys

- Basketball
- Football
- Soccer
- Wrestling

Girls

- Basketball
- Field hockey
- Softball
- Soccer

According to PIAA directory July 2013
