= Chestnuthill Township, Pennsylvania =

Township in Pennsylvania, US

Chestnuthill Township
- Township
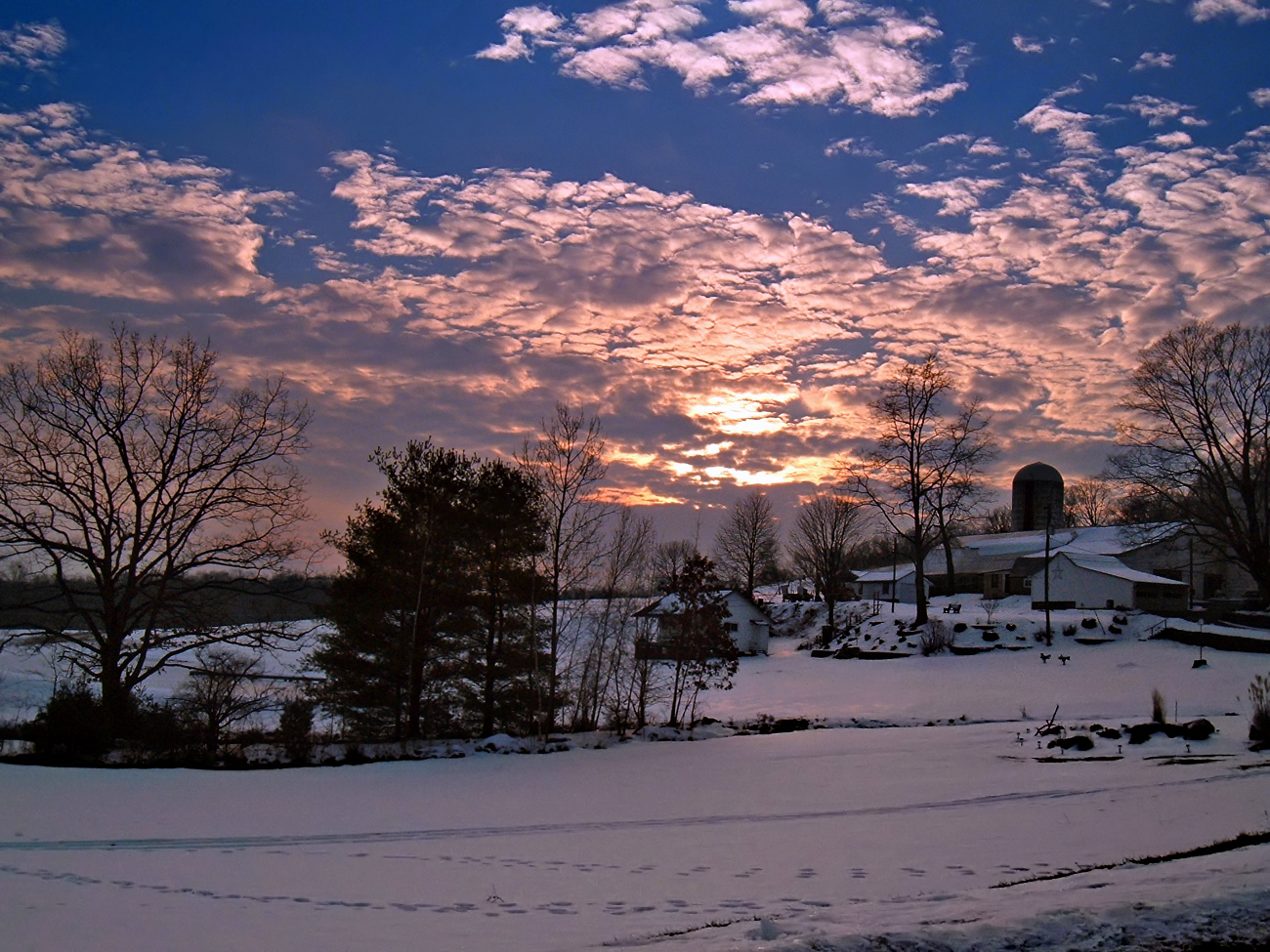
- A farm in Chesnuthill Township in December 2005

- Seal

- Location of Pennsylvania in the United States
- Coordinates: 40°56′00″N 75°21′59″W
- Country: United States
- State: Pennsylvania
- County: Monroe
- Founded: 1763

Area
  - Total: 37.52 sq mi (97.18 km^{2})
  - Land: 37.39 sq mi (96.83 km^{2})
  - Water: 0.14 sq mi (0.35 km^{2})
- Elevation: 696 ft (212 m)

Population (2020)
  - Total: 16,708 ▼
  - Estimate (2021): 16,779
  - Density: 444.3/sq mi (171.55/km^{2})
- Time zone: UTC-5 (EST)
  - Summer (DST): UTC-4 (EDT)
- Area code(s): 570
- FIPS code: 42-089-13328
- Website: www.chestnuthilltwp-pa.gov

Chestnuthill Township is a township in Monroe County, Pennsylvania, United States. The population was 16,708 at the 2020 census.

== Geography ==
According to the United States Census Bureau, the township has a total area of 37.6 square miles (97 km^{2}), of which 37.5 square miles (97.0 km^{2}) is land and 0.1 square miles (0.26 km^{2}) (0.35%) is water. It contains the census-designated places of Brodheadsville, Effort, and parts of Indian Mountain Lake, Sierra View, and Sun Valley.

== Demographics ==
Historical population
Census	Pop.	Note	%±
2000	14,418		—
2010	17,156		19.0%
2020	16,708		−2.6%
2021 (est.)	16,779		0.4%
U.S. Decennial Census

As of the census of 2000, there were 14,418 people, 4,906 households, and 3,905 families residing in the township. The population density was 384.9 inhabitants per square mile (148.6/km^{2}). There were 5,593 housing units at an average density of 149.3 per square mile (57.6/km^{2}). The racial makeup of the township was 92.34% White, 4.06% African American, 0.13% Native American, 1.00% Asian, 0.02% Pacific Islander, 1.03% from other races, and 1.41% from two or more races. Hispanic or Latino of any race were 4.88% of the population.

There were 4,906 households, out of which 42.4% had children under the age of 18 living with them, 67.9% were married couples living together, 7.5% had a female householder with no husband present, and 20.4% were non-families. 16.1% of all households were made up of individuals, and 6.7% had someone living alone who was 65 years of age or older. The average household size was 2.91 and the average family size was 3.26.

In the township the population was spread out, with 29.8% under the age of 18, 6.6% from 18 to 24, 29.7% from 25 to 44, 22.7% from 45 to 64, and 11.3% who were 65 years of age or older. The median age was 37 years. For every 100 females, there were 99.8 males. For every 100 females age 18 and over, there were 96.6 males.

The median income for a household in the township was $50,210, and the median income for a family was $55,058. Males had a median income of $41,988 versus $25,363 for females. The per capita income for the township was $20,017. About 5.9% of families and 7.9% of the population were below the poverty line, including 9.2% of those under age 18 and 6.6% of those age 65 or over.

United States presidential election results for Chestnuthill Township, Pennsylvania
Year	Republican		Democratic		Third party(ies)	
Year	No.	%	No.	%	No.	%
2020	4,787	56.08%	3,648	42.74%	101	1.18%
2016	4,189	57.47%	2,789	38.26%	311	4.27%
2012	3,166	48.99%	3,194	49.42%	103	1.59%
2008	3,271	46.92%	3,633	52.11%	68	0.98%
2004	3,210	53.44%	2,746	45.71%	51	0.85%
2000	2,585	52.51%	2,138	43.43%	200	4.06%

== Emergency Services ==
West End Fire Company provides fire suppression, technical rescue, and hazardous material operations level response in addition to other tasks for all of Chestnuthill Township and provides mutual aid to the surrounding townships. Emergency medical services are provided by West End Community Ambulance Association. Police services are provided by the Pennsylvania State Police.

== Transportation ==
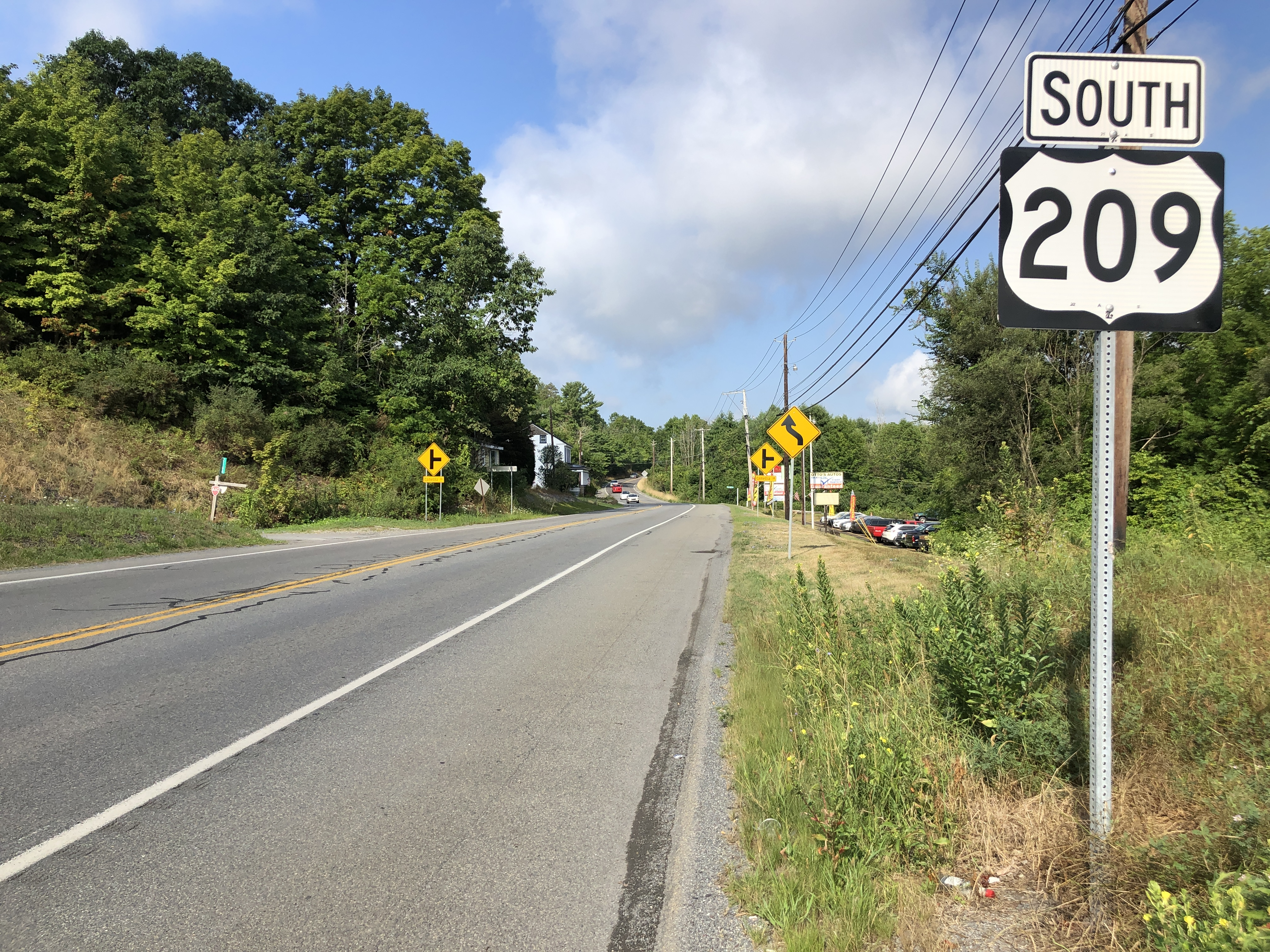
US 209 southbound in Chestnuthill Township

As of 2021, there were 185.89 miles (299.16 km) of public roads in Chestnuthill Township, of which 34.64 miles (55.75 km) were maintained by the Pennsylvania Department of Transportation (PennDOT) and 151.25 miles (243.41 km) were maintained by the township.

U.S. Route 209, Pennsylvania Route 115 and Pennsylvania Route 715 are the numbered highways serving Chestnuthill Township. US 209 follows a southwest–northeast alignment across the southern portion of the township. PA 115 begins at US 209 and heads northwestward across the southern and western portions of the township. PA 715 also begins at US 209 and heads northward across southern and eastern parts of the township.

== Climate ==
According to the Köppen climate classification system, Chestnuthill Township has a Warm-summer Humid continental climate (Dfb).

Climate data for Chestnuthill Twp (40.9566, -75.4182), elevation 1,050 ft (320 m), 1991-2020 normals, extremes 1981-2024
Month	Jan	Feb	Mar	Apr	May	Jun	Jul	Aug	Sep	Oct	Nov	Dec	Year
Record high °F (°C)	65.9 (18.8)	74.4 (23.6)	83.9 (28.8)	90.0 (32.2)	92.1 (33.4)	93.8 (34.3)	98.3 (36.8)	95.4 (35.2)	92.9 (33.8)	85.9 (29.9)	77.3 (25.2)	70.0 (21.1)	98.3 (36.8)
Mean daily maximum °F (°C)	34.6 (1.4)	37.3 (2.9)	45.6 (7.6)	58.7 (14.8)	69.3 (20.7)	77.3 (25.2)	82.0 (27.8)	80.2 (26.8)	73.5 (23.1)	61.4 (16.3)	49.8 (9.9)	39.3 (4.1)	59.2 (15.1)
Daily mean °F (°C)	26.3 (−3.2)	28.3 (−2.1)	36.0 (2.2)	47.6 (8.7)	58.1 (14.5)	66.6 (19.2)	71.3 (21.8)	69.6 (20.9)	62.7 (17.1)	51.0 (10.6)	40.5 (4.7)	31.5 (−0.3)	49.2 (9.6)
Mean daily minimum °F (°C)	18.1 (−7.7)	19.2 (−7.1)	26.3 (−3.2)	36.5 (2.5)	46.9 (8.3)	55.9 (13.3)	60.7 (15.9)	59.0 (15.0)	51.8 (11.0)	40.6 (4.8)	31.2 (−0.4)	23.6 (−4.7)	39.2 (4.0)
Record low °F (°C)	−19.9 (−28.8)	−10.8 (−23.8)	−3.7 (−19.8)	11.5 (−11.4)	27.2 (−2.7)	35.6 (2.0)	40.0 (4.4)	34.9 (1.6)	28.7 (−1.8)	17.9 (−7.8)	2.3 (−16.5)	−13.1 (−25.1)	−19.9 (−28.8)
Average precipitation inches (mm)	3.80 (97)	3.03 (77)	3.96 (101)	4.21 (107)	4.19 (106)	5.10 (130)	5.00 (127)	5.03 (128)	5.29 (134)	5.06 (129)	3.76 (96)	4.54 (115)	52.96 (1,345)
Average snowfall inches (cm)	8.8 (22)	11.8 (30)	6.1 (15)	0.8 (2.0)	0.0 (0.0)	0.0 (0.0)	0.0 (0.0)	0.0 (0.0)	0.0 (0.0)	0.7 (1.8)	1.7 (4.3)	7.4 (19)	37.3 (95)
Average dew point °F (°C)	18.2 (−7.7)	18.4 (−7.6)	24.0 (−4.4)	33.0 (0.6)	45.7 (7.6)	56.7 (13.7)	61.1 (16.2)	60.4 (15.8)	54.3 (12.4)	42.3 (5.7)	31.1 (−0.5)	23.8 (−4.6)	39.2 (4.0)
Source 1: PRISM
Source 2: NOHRSC (Snow, 2008/2009 - 2024/2025 normals)

== Ecology ==
According to the A. W. Kuchler U.S. potential natural vegetation types, Chestnuthill Township would have a dominant vegetation type of Appalachian Oak (104) with a dominant vegetation form of Eastern Hardwood Forest (25). The peak spring bloom typically occurs in late-April and peak fall color usually occurs in mid-October. The plant hardiness zone is 6a with an average annual extreme minimum air temperature of −9.0 °F (−23 °C).
