= Monroe County, Pennsylvania =

County in Pennsylvania, United States

- County
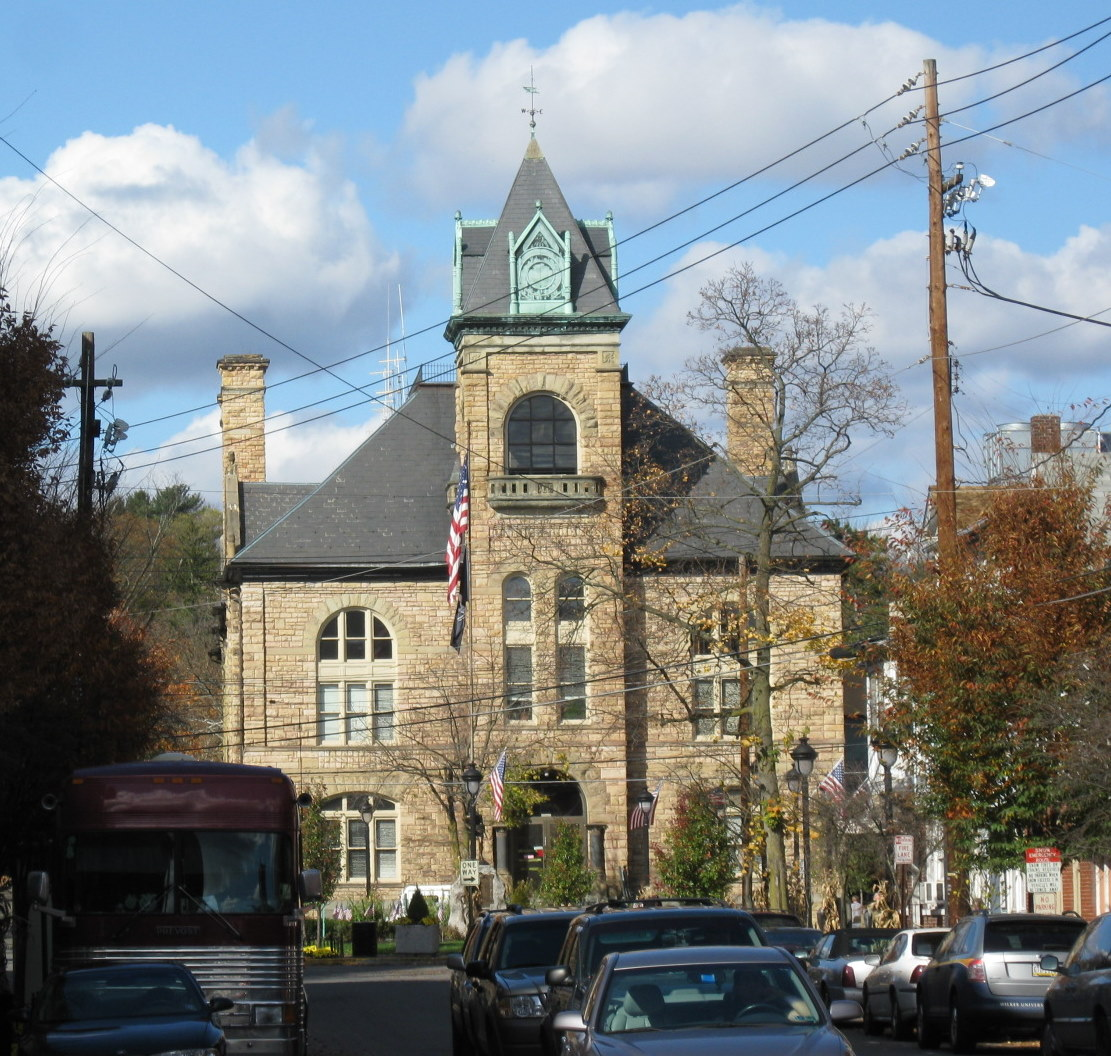
- Monroe County Courthouse in Stroudsburg in November 2009

- Seal

- Location within the U.S. state of Pennsylvania
- Coordinates: 41°04′N 75°20′W
- Country: United States
- State: Pennsylvania
- Founded: April 1, 1836
- Named for: James Monroe 270
- Seat: Stroudsburg
- Largest township: Coolbaugh Township

Area
  - Total: 617 sq mi (1,600 km^{2})
  - Land: 608 sq mi (1,570 km^{2})
  - Water: 9.0 sq mi (23 km^{2}) 1.5%

Population (2020)
  - Total: 168,327
  - Estimate (2025): 167,179 ▼
  - Density: 270/sq mi (100/km^{2})
- Time zone: UTC−5 (Eastern)
  - Summer (DST): UTC−4 (EDT)
- Congressional districts: 7th, 8th
- Website: http://www.monroecountypa.gov

Monroe County is a county in the Commonwealth of Pennsylvania. As of the 2020 census, the population was 168,327. Its county seat is Stroudsburg. The county is part of the Northeast Pennsylvania region of the state. (Note: Includes Luzerne, Lackawanna, Monroe, Schuylkill, Carbon, Pike, Bradford, Wayne, Susquehanna, Wyoming and Sullivan Counties) The county was formed from sections of Northampton and Pike counties on April 1, 1836. It was named in honor of James Monroe, the fifth president of the United States.

The county borders Northampton County and the Lehigh Valley to its south, Pike and Wayne counties to its north, Carbon and Luzerne counties to its west, and the Delaware River and Warren County, New Jersey to its east. It is part of the New York metropolitan area, but also receives media from the Scranton/Wilkes-Barre and Philadelphia radio and television markets.

In the late 20th and early 21st centuries, Monroe County was one of the fastest-growing counties in Pennsylvania, largely due to Pocono Mountain-related tourism and partly due to an influx of residents from New York City and its metropolitan area who sought a lower cost of living while still being close enough to commute to the city. The population increased by over 70% from 1990 to 2010, and the commercial and retail sectors expanded significantly, although population growth has since slowed.

The county is home to East Stroudsburg University.

The Lehigh River, a 109-mile-long (175 km) tributary of the Delaware River, flows southward through Monroe County and then into the Lehigh Valley, where it joins the Delaware River in Easton, Pennsylvania.

== Geography ==
According to the U.S. Census Bureau, the county has a total area of 617 square miles (1,600 km^{2}), of which 608 square miles (1,570 km^{2}) is land and 9.0 square miles (23 km^{2}) (1.5%) is water. It has a humid continental climate (Dfb except for some Dfa in the southern and SE tiers) and the hardiness zone ranges from 5a to 6b. The area code is 570, except in the southwest where the Kunkletown exchange uses 610.

=== Adjacent counties ===
- Wayne County (north)
- Pike County (northeast)
- Sussex County, New Jersey (northeast)
- Warren County, New Jersey (east)
- Northampton County (south)
- Carbon County (west)
- Luzerne County (northwest)
- Lackawanna County (northwest)

=== National protected areas ===
- Cherry Valley National Wildlife Refuge
- Delaware Water Gap National Recreation Area (part)
- Middle Delaware National Scenic River (part)

== Demographics ==
Historical population
Census	Pop.	Note	%±
1840	9,879		—
1850	13,270		34.3%
1860	16,758		26.3%
1870	18,362		9.6%
1880	20,175		9.9%
1890	20,111		−0.3%
1900	21,161		5.2%
1910	22,941		8.4%
1920	24,295		5.9%
1930	28,286		16.4%
1940	29,802		5.4%
1950	33,773		13.3%
1960	39,567		17.2%
1970	45,422		14.8%
1980	69,409		52.8%
1990	95,709		37.9%
2000	138,687		44.9%
2010	169,842		22.5%
2020	168,327		−0.9%
2023 (est.)	167,179	▼	−0.7%
U.S. Decennial Census; 1790–1960 1900–1990; 1990–2000 2010–2019

=== Racial and ethnic composition ===
Monroe County, Pennsylvania – Racial and ethnic composition Note: the US Census treats Hispanic/Latino as an ethnic category. This table excludes Latinos from the racial categories and assigns them to a separate category. Hispanics/Latinos may be of any race.
Race / Ethnicity (NH = Non-Hispanic)	Pop 1980	Pop 1990	Pop 2000	Pop 2010	Pop 2020	% 1980	% 1990	% 2000	% 2010	% 2020
White alone (NH)	67,489	91,171	117,592	119,741	104,716	97.23%	95.26%	84.79%	70.50%	62.21%
Black or African American alone (NH)	964	1,662	7,902	20,461	22,823	1.39%	1.74%	5.70%	12.05%	13.56%
Native American or Alaska Native alone (NH)	48	109	258	358	289	0.07%	0.11%	0.19%	0.21%	0.17%
Asian alone (NH)	250	647	1,518	3,395	3,947	0.36%	0.68%	1.09%	2.00%	2.34%
Native Hawaiian or Pacific Islander alone (NH)	x	x	30	60	56	x	x	0.02%	0.04%	0.03%
Other race alone (NH)	106	68	229	503	1,407	0.15%	0.07%	0.17%	0.30%	0.84%
Mixed race or Multiracial (NH)	x	x	1,963	3,036	6,531	x	x	1.42%	1.79%	3.88%
Hispanic or Latino (any race)	552	2,052	9,195	22,288	28,558	0.80%	2.14%	6.63%	13.12%	16.97%
Total	69,409	95,709	138,687	169,842	168,327	100.00%	100.00%	100.00%	100.00%	100.00%

=== 2020 census ===
As of the 2020 census, the county had a population of 168,327. The median age was 43.2 years. 20.2% of residents were under the age of 18 and 17.8% of residents were 65 years of age or older. For every 100 females there were 97.6 males, and for every 100 females age 18 and over there were 95.8 males age 18 and over.

The racial makeup of the county was 65.9% White, 14.8% Black or African American, 0.4% American Indian and Alaska Native, 2.4% Asian, <0.1% Native Hawaiian and Pacific Islander, 6.9% from some other race, and 9.6% from two or more races. Hispanic or Latino residents of any race comprised 17.0% of the population.

43.2% of residents lived in urban areas, while 56.8% lived in rural areas.

There were 62,284 households in the county, of which 29.6% had children under the age of 18 living in them. Of all households, 50.5% were married-couple households, 18.1% were households with a male householder and no spouse or partner present, and 23.9% were households with a female householder and no spouse or partner present. About 23.8% of all households were made up of individuals and 10.4% had someone living alone who was 65 years of age or older.

There were 79,114 housing units, of which 21.3% were vacant. Among occupied housing units, 76.6% were owner-occupied and 23.4% were renter-occupied. The homeowner vacancy rate was 2.1% and the rental vacancy rate was 9.5%.

=== 2010 census ===
As of the 2010 census, there were 169,842 people, 49,454 households, and 36,447 families residing in the county. The population density was 228 inhabitants per square mile (88/km^{2}). There were 67,581 housing units at an average density of 111 units per square mile (43/km^{2}). The racial makeup of the county was 70.5% White Non-Hispanic, 13.2% Black or African American, 0.3% Native American, 2.1% Asian, 0.03% Pacific Islander, 4.3% from other races, and 2.9% from two or more races. 13.1% of the population were Hispanic or Latino of any race. 19.9% were of German, 16.8% Irish, 14.5% Italian, 8.8% Pennsylvania German, 5.4% Polish, 5.1% American and 5.1% English ancestry.

There were 49,454 households, out of which 36.20% had children under the age of 18 living with them, 60.70% were married couples living together, 8.80% had a female householder with no husband present, and 26.30% were non-families. 20.20% of all households were made up of individuals, and 7.80% had someone living alone who was 65 years of age or older. The average household size was 2.73 and the average family size was 3.16.

In the county, the population was spread out, with 26.80% under the age of 18, 8.60% from 18 to 24, 28.80% from 25 to 44, 23.50% from 45 to 64, and 12.30% who were 65 years of age or older. The median age was 37 years. For every 100 females there were 97.60 males. For every 100 females age 18 and over, there were 94.40 males.

=== Housing ===
As of the end of 2021, the median value of all homes in Monroe County was $210,972, an increase of 13% since the prior year.

== Micropolitan statistical area ==
The U.S. Office of Management and Budget has designated Monroe County as the East Stroudsburg, PA micropolitan statistical area. Prior to 2023, the area was designated as a metropolitan area. As of the 2010 census the Metro area had a population of 169,842. The area ranks 12th most populous in the state of Pennsylvania and ranks 244th most populous in the United States.

The U.S. Office of Management and Budget has also designated Monroe County as part of the larger Allentown-Bethlehem-East Stroudsburg, PA-NJ Combined Statistical Area. As of the 2020 US Census, the population of the CSA was 1,030,216, making it the third most populous Combined Statistical Area in Pennsylvania, and the 59th most populous in the United States. Monroe County was once part of the New York CSA, but as of 2023, Pike County is the only county in Pennsylvania grouped with New York's CSA.

== Politics ==
In the 19th and early 20th century, Monroe was the most Democratic county in Pennsylvania. For much of the second half of the 20th century, Monroe County was a Republican stronghold. However, in recent years, party registration has leaned toward the Democratic Party, a result of continued migration to the county by former New York City residents, many of whom are Democrats. While in the 2004 U.S. presidential election the county was carried by Republican George W. Bush by a margin of four votes, beginning with the first campaign (2008) of Barack Obama, Democratic candidates carried Monroe County. In that election Obama carried the county by a 17-point margin, 58% to 41%–the first Democrat to win the county since 1964, and only the second since 1940. The other three 2008 statewide Democratic candidates also carried the county handily. Additionally, the Democratic presidential candidates carried the county in 2012 (Obama), 2016 (Hillary Clinton), and 2020 (Joe Biden). The Democratic streak ended in 2024 when Republican Donald Trump narrowly flipped the county, becoming the first Republican to win the county in two decades.

United States presidential election results for Monroe County, Pennsylvania
Year	Republican		Democratic		Third party(ies)	
Year	No.	%	No.	%	No.	%
1880	962	22.30%	3,334	77.28%	18	0.42%
1884	1,009	23.59%	3,242	75.78%	27	0.63%
1888	1,107	24.95%	3,274	73.79%	56	1.26%
1892	1,020	24.53%	3,078	74.01%	61	1.47%
1896	1,447	31.80%	2,887	63.44%	217	4.77%
1900	1,264	27.99%	3,054	67.63%	198	4.38%
1904	1,446	34.46%	2,587	61.65%	163	3.88%
1908	1,454	31.62%	3,004	65.32%	141	3.07%
1912	536	11.64%	3,107	67.48%	961	20.87%
1916	1,456	29.80%	3,348	68.52%	82	1.68%
1920	3,278	48.01%	3,396	49.74%	154	2.26%
1924	3,462	44.28%	3,901	49.89%	456	5.83%
1928	7,469	69.40%	3,266	30.35%	27	0.25%
1932	4,659	41.60%	6,357	56.76%	183	1.63%
1936	5,778	41.04%	8,212	58.33%	89	0.63%
1940	6,001	47.30%	6,670	52.57%	16	0.13%
1944	6,202	52.88%	5,490	46.81%	37	0.32%
1948	6,674	53.02%	5,913	46.98%	0	0.00%
1952	9,502	62.09%	5,760	37.64%	42	0.27%
1956	10,081	64.30%	5,506	35.12%	92	0.59%
1960	11,299	63.74%	6,312	35.61%	115	0.65%
1964	6,281	36.91%	10,622	62.41%	116	0.68%
1968	9,465	53.33%	6,946	39.14%	1,336	7.53%
1972	12,701	67.51%	5,619	29.87%	494	2.63%
1976	10,228	50.72%	9,544	47.33%	393	1.95%
1980	12,357	55.44%	7,551	33.88%	2,381	10.68%
1984	16,109	65.82%	8,193	33.48%	172	0.70%
1988	17,185	62.79%	9,859	36.02%	327	1.19%
1992	14,557	38.82%	13,468	35.91%	9,475	25.27%
1996	17,326	44.35%	16,547	42.36%	5,192	13.29%
2000	23,265	49.63%	21,939	46.80%	1,674	3.57%
2004	27,971	49.65%	27,967	49.64%	404	0.72%
2008	28,293	41.23%	39,453	57.50%	872	1.27%
2012	26,867	42.63%	35,221	55.89%	935	1.48%
2016	33,386	47.69%	33,918	48.45%	2,704	3.86%
2020	38,726	46.08%	44,060	52.43%	1,248	1.49%
2024	42,676	49.77%	42,007	48.99%	1,069	1.25%

United States Senate election results for Monroe County, Pennsylvania1
Year	Republican		Democratic		Third party(ies)	
Year	No.	%	No.	%	No.	%
1994	14,364	56.64%	10,159	40.06%	838	3.30%
2000	25,524	58.01%	17,351	39.43%	1,125	2.56%
2006	15,555	43.92%	19,862	56.08%	0	0.00%
2012	25,579	42.63%	33,502	55.84%	918	1.53%
2018	23,968	43.25%	30,626	55.27%	818	1.48%
2024	40,884	48.07%	41,712	49.04%	2,455	2.89%

United States Senate election results for Monroe County, Pennsylvania3
Year	Republican		Democratic		Third party(ies)	
Year	No.	%	No.	%	No.	%
1992	17,580	49.21%	16,792	47.00%	1,355	3.79%
1998	15,393	63.11%	7,967	32.67%	1,030	4.22%
2004	29,741	55.56%	22,224	41.52%	1,563	2.92%
2010	20,295	51.75%	18,921	48.25%	0	0.00%
2016	30,743	46.03%	34,280	51.32%	1,768	2.65%
2022	26,746	45.54%	30,251	51.51%	1,733	2.95%

Pennsylvania Gubernatorial election results for Monroe County
Year	Republican		Democratic		Third party(ies)	
Year	No.	%	No.	%	No.	%
1970	6,384	45.47%	7,266	51.75%	390	2.78%
1974	6,761	50.34%	6,520	48.54%	150	1.12%
1978	9,100	58.07%	6,398	40.82%	174	1.11%
1982	9,947	55.14%	7,905	43.82%	187	1.04%
1986	9,272	53.97%	7,800	45.40%	109	0.63%
1990	6,761	35.58%	12,243	64.42%	0	0.00%
1994	14,409	54.09%	10,137	38.05%	2,093	7.86%
1998	17,243	65.97%	7,160	27.40%	1,733	6.63%
2002	15,258	49.57%	14,570	47.34%	950	3.09%
2006	14,071	39.64%	21,430	60.36%	0	0.00%
2010	21,162	53.92%	18,082	46.08%	0	0.00%
2014	15,046	43.10%	19,864	56.90%	0	0.00%
2018	22,530	40.64%	32,064	57.84%	843	1.52%
2022	25,604	43.52%	32,009	54.41%	1,214	2.06%

As of November 11, 2024, there are 120,056 registered voters in Monroe County.

- Democratic: 51,318 (42.74%)
- Republican: 43,711 (36.41%)
- Independent: 19,275 (16.06%)
- Minor Party: 5,752 (4.79%)

=== Other county offices ===
- Controller, Erik Diemer, Democratic
- Coroner, Thomas Yanac, Democratic
- District Attorney, Mike Mancuso, Democratic
- Prothonotary, George Warden, Republican
- Recorder of Deeds and Register of Wills, Kate Best, Democratic
- Sheriff, Nick Cirranello, Democratic
- Treasurer, Theresa Johnson, Republican

=== State representatives ===
- Maureen Madden, Democratic, 115th district
- Jack Rader, Jr., Republican, 176th district
- Tarah Probst, Democrat, 189th district

=== State senator ===
- Rosemary Brown, Republican, 40th district

=== United States representatives ===
- Ryan Mackenzie, Republican, Pennsylvania's 7th congressional district
- Robert Bresnahan, Republican, Pennsylvania's 8th congressional district

=== United States senators ===
- Dave McCormick, Republican
- John Fetterman, Democratic

=== Governor ===
- Josh Shapiro, Democratic

== Transportation ==
=== Public transportation ===
Public transportation throughout the county is provided by the Monroe County Transit Authority (MCTA), known as the "Pocono Pony". MCTA operates a fixed route bus system and a paratransit curb to curb service for eligible populations.

New Jersey Transit is restoring train tracks in northwestern New Jersey along the Lackawanna Cut-off. This would, potentially, also involve the train to go to Scranton from Hoboken, which would go through the Poconos, marking the first time since the early 1970s when the Erie Lackawanna Railroad stopped running daily trains through the area.

=== Major highways ===
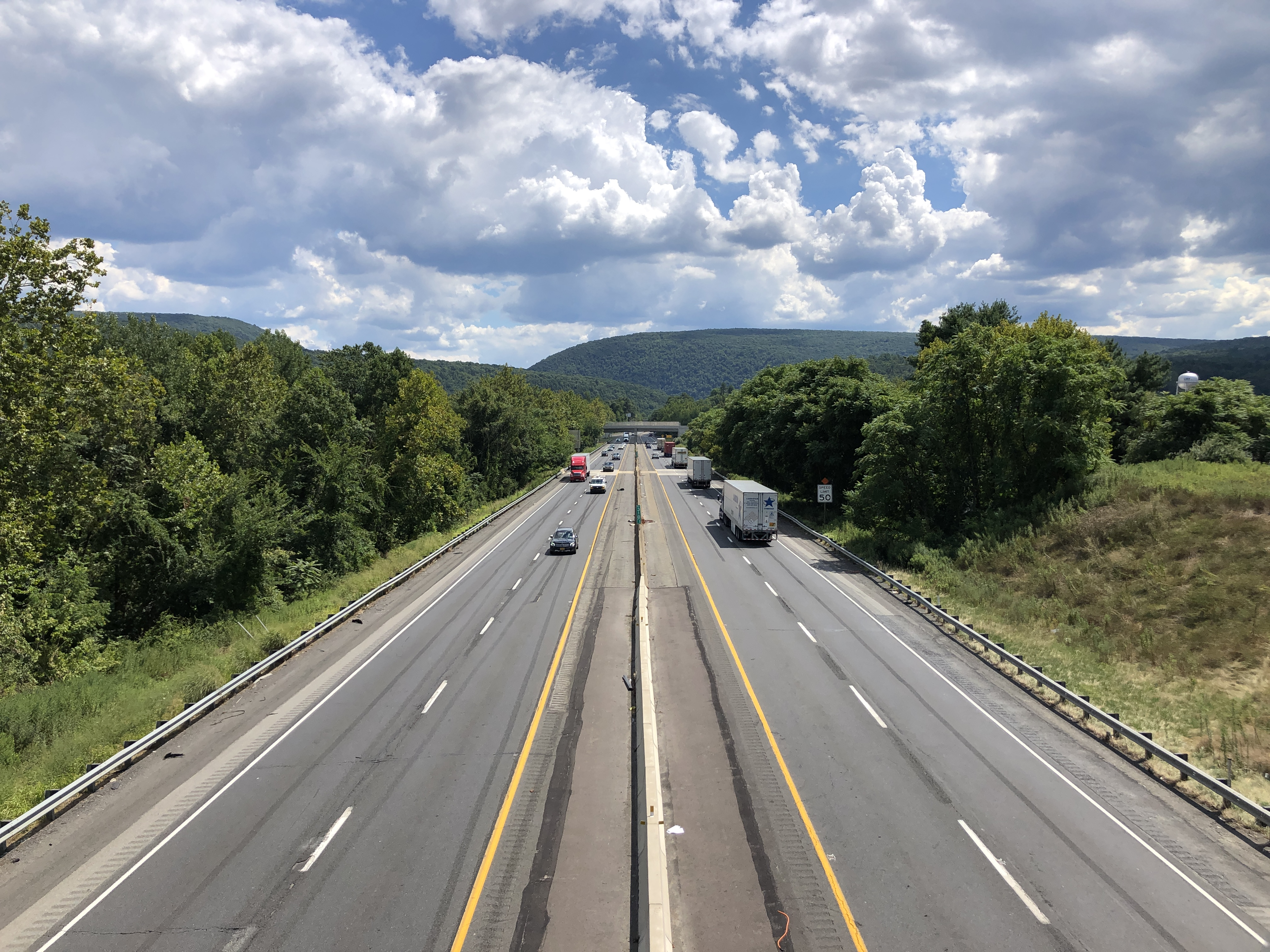
I-80 eastbound in Monroe County

- I-80
- I-380
- US 209
- US 209 Bus.
- PA 33
- PA 115
- PA 191
- PA 196
- PA 314
- PA 390
- PA 402
- PA 423
- PA 435
- PA 447
- PA 507
- PA 534
- PA 611
- PA 715
- PA 903
- PA 940

== Education ==
=== Colleges and universities ===
- East Stroudsburg University of Pennsylvania (in East Stroudsburg)
- Northampton Community College Monroe Campus (in Tannersville)

=== Public school districts ===
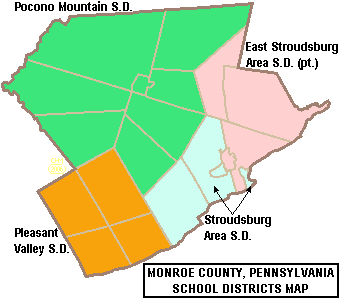
Map of Monroe County public school districts

They are:

- East Stroudsburg Area School District
- Pleasant Valley School District
- Pocono Mountain School District
- Stroudsburg Area School District

=== Charter schools ===
- Evergreen Community Charter School, Cresco

=== Technology schools ===
- Monroe Career and Technical Institute, Bartonsville

=== Private schools ===
- Art Learning Center, East Stroudsburg
- Character Builders Christian Academy, Pocono Pines
- Monsignor McHugh School, Cresco - Roman Catholic Diocese of Scranton, **closed in 2020**
- Notre Dame Elementary School, East Stroudsburg
- Notre Dame High School, East Stroudsburg
- St Pauls Lutheran Pre-School, East Stroudsburg
- Stroudsburg 7th Day Adventists School, Stroudsburg
- Triumphant & Excellence Academy 1, East Stroudsburg
- Triumphant & Excellence Academy 2 TEA Institute, Tobyhanna
- Triumphant Living Heritage, Marshalls Creek
- Victory Baptist Christian School, Brodheadsville
- The Growing Concern Elementary School, Stroudsburg

Private schools are as reported in EdNA school database maintained and published by the Pennsylvania Department of Education, 2011

== Industry ==
The Tobyhanna Army Depot, the U.S. Department of Defense's largest center for the repair and fabrication of electronic systems, is located in Monroe County. It was identified in 2004 as the largest employer in northeastern Pennsylvania.

== Parks and trails ==
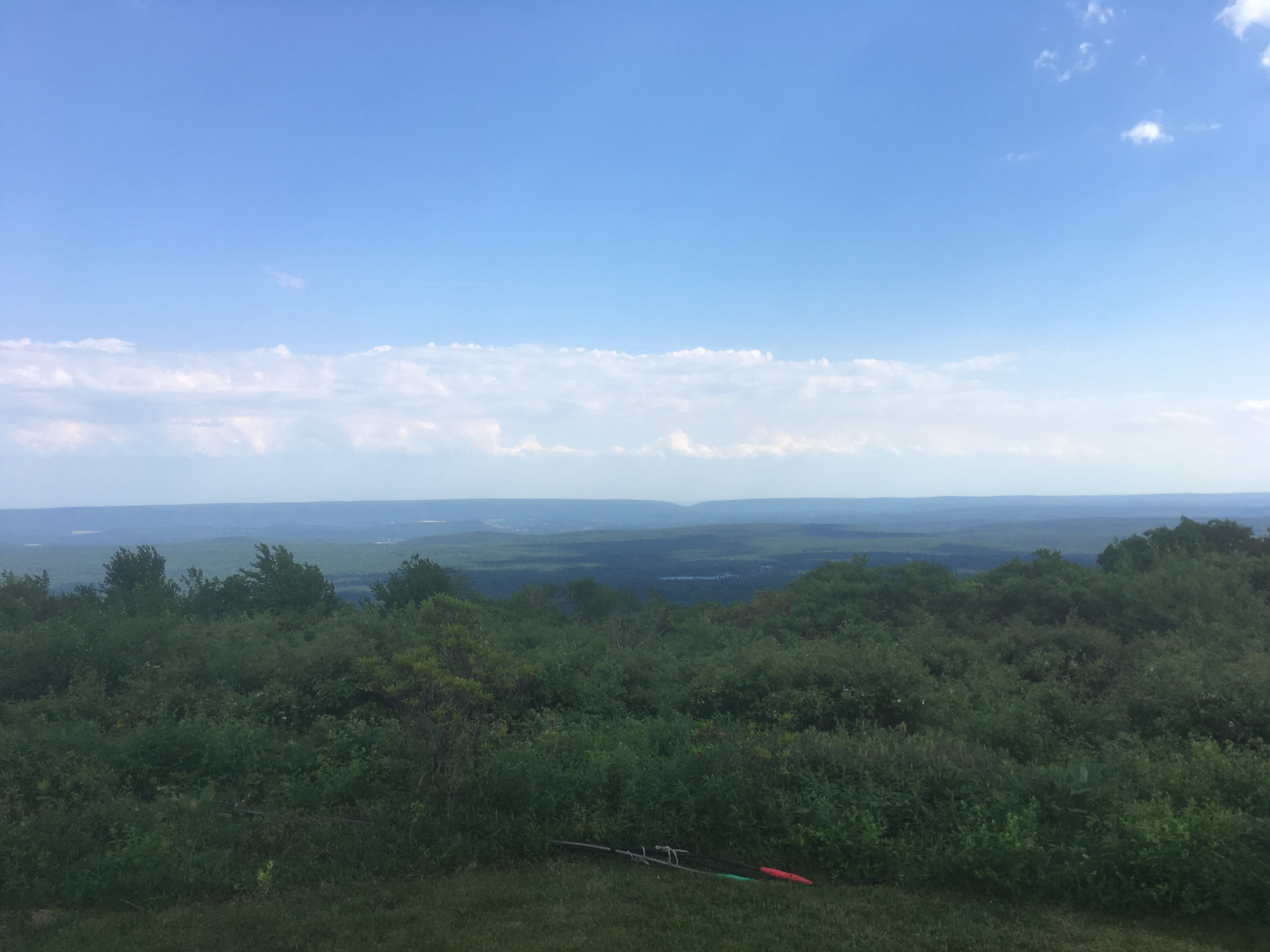
The view from Big Pocono State Park at Camelback Mountain

The Delaware Water Gap National Recreation Area, which "includes nearly 70,000 acres (280 km^{2}) of mountains, valleys and floodplains," is partially located in Monroe County. The county also has Pennsylvania state parks, such as Big Pocono State Park and parts of the Delaware State Forest, Gouldsboro State Park, and Tobyhanna State Park.

The Appalachian Trail passes through Monroe County. David Pierce wrote in the Pocono Record, "The 2,184-mile [3,515 km] public footpath—from Georgia to Maine—has a particularly scenic but rugged section that straddles Monroe County's southern border..." He stated that "trail hiking has long been an integral part of Monroe County's identity..."

During the Revolutionary War in 1779, General John Sullivan marched his troops through Monroe County on their expedition to fight the Iroquois tribe in New York State. There are many historical markers identifying the Sullivan Trail. Sergeant Moses Fellows of the Third New Hampshire Regiment described the area as "...very poor & Barren and I think as never will Be Settled."

The Long Pond Conservation Easement has over 10,000 acres (40 km^{2}) of public access land with numerous trail systems. It's one of the most extensive public access trail systems in Monroe County.

Dixon Miller State Forest – this is an extensive trail system in Long Pond, PA.

Jonas Mountain Nature Preserve is over 300 acres (120 ha) of Trail system that encompasses an old mountain ridge, and Jonas Creek.

Cherry Valley National Wildlife Refuge has elaborate Trail systems, and public access.

Mount Wismer is a scenic hike in Monroe County.

Nothstein Preserve is an elaborate wooded trail system in the Poconos

Chestnut mountain nature preserve is a many acre preserve atop the Plateau.

The county is home to the Tannersville Cranberry Bog, the southernmost boreal bog in the Eastern United States.

== Resorts ==
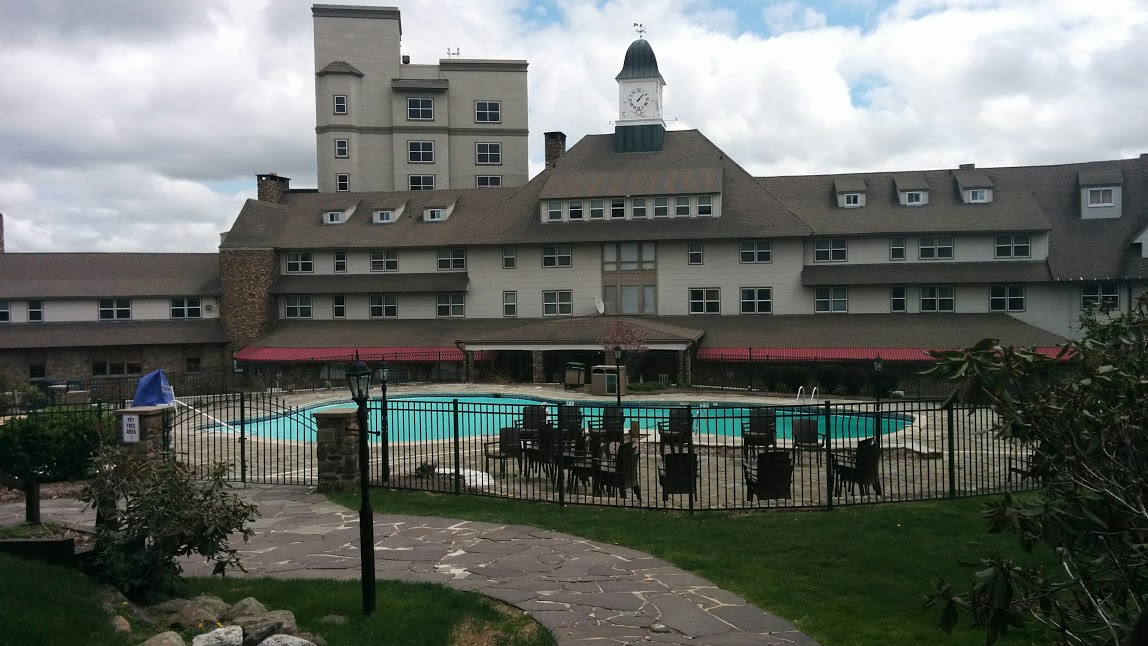
Inn At Pocono Manor in May 2015

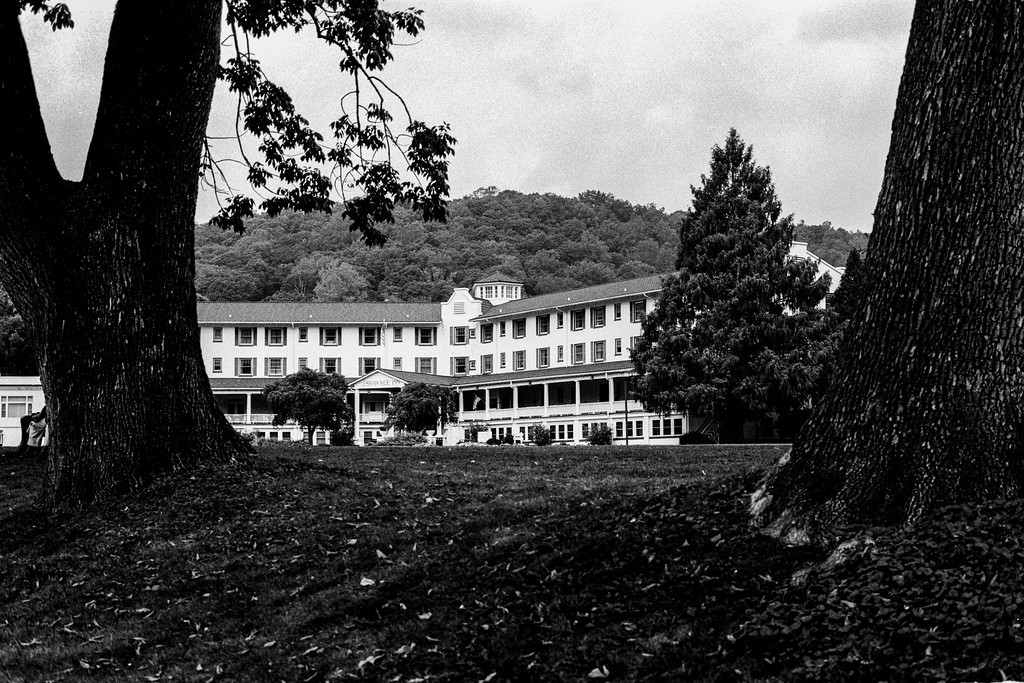
The Shawnee Inn & Golf Resort

Two of the earliest Pocono resorts, founded by rival factions of the Philadelphia Quaker community, were located in Monroe County: Inn at Buck Hill Falls (1901) and Pocono Manor (1902). These resorts did not allow liquor or dancing, and evening dress was discouraged. The Quakers "brought a quiet, unostentatious style to the region," but their hotels later developed from religious retreats into "luxurious mountain resorts." Buck Hill's stone facade became a model for close to 300 stately stone-and-shingle homes in the region. Pocono Manor offers sweeping vistas of the eastern and western Pocono region and has been referred to as the "Grand Lady of the Mountains." Buck Hill closed in 1990 and the Inn at Pocono Manor was mostly destroyed by fire in 2019.

Skytop Lodge, built in 1928, is also located in Monroe County and has been described as a "Dutch Colonial-style manor house." Designed in reaction to the Quaker resorts, it had a dance floor and served liquor in a basement bar. Skytop offers thirty miles of hiking trails, and the main building "is surrounded by 5,000 acres (20 km^{2}) of wood, glacial bogs, hemlock gorges, beaver marshes, and cascading waterfalls."

The Buckwood Inn opened in Monroe County in 1911 and included the first golf course to be designed by renowned golf architect A. W. Tillinghast. Bandleader Fred Waring purchased the resort in 1943, renamed it the Shawnee Inn, and broadcast his radio shows from there. The Shawnee Inn is a Spanish colonial revival building with white-Moorish architecture and Spanish tiled roofs, and it was identified in the 1990s as the only resort on the banks of the Delaware River.

Mount Airy Lodge, which expanded from an eight-room inn into the largest Pocono resort, was located in Monroe County. It heavily advertised in the New York media market with the catchy jingle, "Beautiful Mount Airy Lodge." Headliners, such as Bob Hope, Milton Berle, and Connie Francis, performed in the Crystal Room, Mount Airy's 2,000-seat theater. Comedian Mickey Freeman said, "The food was lousy, but it was a legalized orgy." The 1,200 acres (490 ha) resort's heyday was in the 1960s and 1970s before closing in 2001. In October 2007 the Mount Airy Casino Resort opened on the site.

As of July 2015, there were three resorts in Monroe County with indoor water parks: Great Wolf Lodge, Aquatopia at Camelback Resort, and Kalahari Resort.

== Communities ==
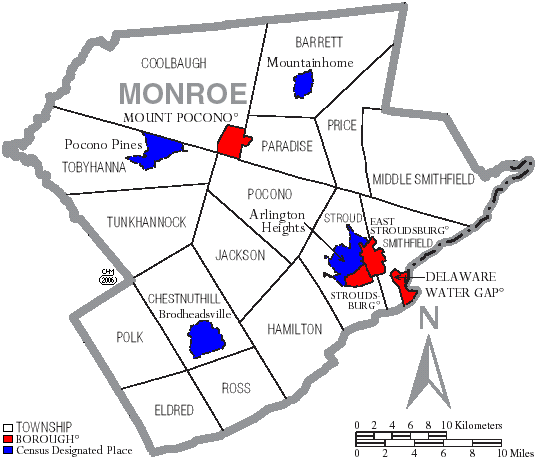
Map of Monroe County, Pennsylvania with Municipal Labels showing Boroughs (red), Townships (white), and Census-designated places (blue).

Under Pennsylvania law, there are four types of incorporated municipalities: cities, boroughs, townships, and, in at most two cases, towns. The only boroughs or towns being over 15,000 in population in the 2020 Census are Coolbaugh, Middle Smithfield and Stroud.

The following cities, boroughs, and townships are located in Monroe County:

=== Boroughs ===
- Delaware Water Gap
- East Stroudsburg
- Mount Pocono
- Stroudsburg (county seat)

=== Townships ===
- Barrett
- Chestnuthill
- Coolbaugh
- Eldred
- Hamilton
- Jackson
- Middle Smithfield
- Paradise
- Pocono
- Polk
- Price
- Ross
- Smithfield
- Stroud
- Tobyhanna
- Tunkhannock

=== Census-designated places ===
Census-designated places are geographical areas designated by the U.S. Census Bureau for the purposes of compiling demographic data. They are not actual jurisdictions under Pennsylvania law.

- Arlington Heights
- Brodheadsville
- Effort
- Emerald Lakes
- Gouldsboro
- Indian Mountain Lake (partially in Carbon County)
- Mountainhome
- Penn Estates
- Pocono Pines
- Saw Creek (mostly in Pike County)
- Saylorsburg
- Sierra View
- Sun Valley

=== Unincorporated communities ===
- Analomink
- Appenzell
- Bartonsville
- Blakeslee
- Bossardsville
- Canadensis
- Cherry Valley
- Cresco
- Hamilton Square
- Henryville
- Jonas
- Kellersville
- Kemmertown
- Kresgeville
- Kunkletown
- Long Pond
- Marshalls Creek
- McIlhaney
- McMichaels
- Meistertown
- Neola
- Paradise Valley
- Pocono Manor
- Pocono Summit
- Reeders
- Sciota
- Scotrun
- Shawnee on Delaware
- Skytop
- Snydersvillle
- South Stroudsburg
- Swiftwater
- Tannersville
- Tobyhanna

=== Population ranking ===
The population ranking of the following table is based on the 2010 census of Monroe County.

† county seat

Rank	City/Town/etc.	Municipal type	Population (2010 Census)
1	East Stroudsburg	Borough	9,840
2	Arlington Heights	CDP	6,333
3	† Stroudsburg	Borough	5,567
4	Sierra View	CDP	4,813
5	Penn Estates	CDP	4,493
6	Indian Mountain Lake (partially in Carbon County)	CDP	4,372
7	Saw Creek (mostly in Pike County)	CDP	4,016
8	Mount Pocono	Borough	3,170
9	Emerald Lakes	CDP	2,886
10	Sun Valley	CDP	2,399
11	Effort	CDP	2,269
12	Brodheadsville	CDP	1,800
13	Pocono Pines	CDP	1,409
14	Mountainhome	CDP	1,182
15	Saylorsburg	CDP	1,126
16	Gouldsboro (mostly in Wayne County)	CDP	890
17	Delaware Water Gap	Borough	746

== Watersheds ==
Monroe County has three major watersheds, all of which are part of the Delaware River Watershed.

The Brodhead Watershed, the Aquashicola Pohopoco Watershed, and the Tobyhanna Tunkhannock Watershed.

== Climate ==
=== Pocono Plateau Region ===
According to the Trewartha climate classification system, the higher elevation Pocono Plateau Region of Monroe County has a Temperate Continental climate (Dc) with warm summers (b), cold winters (o) and year-around precipitation (Dcbo). Dcbo climates are characterized by at least one month having an average mean temperature ≤ 32.0 °F (0.0 °C), four to seven months with an average mean temperature ≥ 50.0 °F (10.0 °C), all months with an average mean temperature < 72.0 °F (22.2 °C) and no significant precipitation difference between seasons. Although most summer days are comfortably humid on the Pocono Plateau, episodes of heat and high humidity can occur with heat index values > 92 °F (33 °C). Since 1981, the highest air temperature was 93.0 °F (33.9 °C) on July 15, 1995, and the highest daily average mean dew point was 70.8 °F (21.6 °C) on January 8, 2006. July is the peak month for thunderstorm activity which correlates with the average warmest month of the year. Since 1981, the wettest calendar day was 6.43 inches (163 mm) on September 30, 2010. During the winter months, the plant hardiness zone is 5b with an average annual extreme minimum air temperature of −11.2 °F (−24.0 °C). Since 1981, the coldest air temperature was −22.9 °F (−30.5 °C) on January 21, 1994. Episodes of extreme cold and wind can occur with wind chill values < −24 °F (−31 °C). The average snowiest month is January which correlates with the average coldest month of the year. Ice storms and large snowstorms depositing ≥ 12 inches (30 cm) of snow occur nearly every year, particularly during nor'easters from December through March.

Climate data for 4 NE Tobyhanna, Elevation 2,087 ft (636 m), 1981–2010 normals, extremes 1981–2018
Month	Jan	Feb	Mar	Apr	May	Jun	Jul	Aug	Sep	Oct	Nov	Dec	Year
Record high °F (°C)	60.9 (16.1)	71.1 (21.7)	80.3 (26.8)	86.4 (30.2)	88.9 (31.6)	88.5 (31.4)	93.0 (33.9)	91.5 (33.1)	89.1 (31.7)	81.4 (27.4)	74.8 (23.8)	65.2 (18.4)	93.0 (33.9)
Mean daily maximum °F (°C)	29.9 (−1.2)	33.3 (0.7)	41.6 (5.3)	54.3 (12.4)	65.4 (18.6)	73.2 (22.9)	77.5 (25.3)	76.0 (24.4)	68.9 (20.5)	57.3 (14.1)	46.1 (7.8)	34.3 (1.3)	54.9 (12.7)
Daily mean °F (°C)	21.9 (−5.6)	25.0 (−3.9)	32.3 (0.2)	44.6 (7.0)	55.2 (12.9)	63.5 (17.5)	68.1 (20.1)	66.8 (19.3)	59.8 (15.4)	48.4 (9.1)	38.5 (3.6)	27.3 (−2.6)	46.0 (7.8)
Mean daily minimum °F (°C)	13.9 (−10.1)	16.6 (−8.6)	23.0 (−5.0)	34.8 (1.6)	45.0 (7.2)	53.8 (12.1)	58.7 (14.8)	57.6 (14.2)	50.7 (10.4)	39.5 (4.2)	30.9 (−0.6)	20.3 (−6.5)	37.2 (2.9)
Record low °F (°C)	−22.9 (−30.5)	−14.1 (−25.6)	−9.0 (−22.8)	10.7 (−11.8)	27.5 (−2.5)	33.2 (0.7)	38.1 (3.4)	34.3 (1.3)	28.2 (−2.1)	17.9 (−7.8)	−0.7 (−18.2)	−16.2 (−26.8)	−22.9 (−30.5)
Average precipitation inches (mm)	3.66 (93)	3.31 (84)	4.27 (108)	4.54 (115)	4.67 (119)	5.13 (130)	4.78 (121)	4.32 (110)	5.14 (131)	5.31 (135)	4.44 (113)	4.25 (108)	53.82 (1,367)
Average snowfall inches (cm)	20.9 (53)	15.0 (38)	15.6 (40)	3.7 (9.4)	0.0 (0.0)	0.0 (0.0)	0.0 (0.0)	0.0 (0.0)	0.0 (0.0)	0.1 (0.25)	3.9 (9.9)	12.5 (32)	71.7 (182)
Average relative humidity (%)	76.0	70.3	66.5	62.3	64.9	74.1	74.0	77.1	78.5	75.2	74.2	77.8	72.6
Average dew point °F (°C)	15.5 (−9.2)	16.7 (−8.5)	22.4 (−5.3)	32.5 (0.3)	43.6 (6.4)	55.1 (12.8)	59.5 (15.3)	59.4 (15.2)	53.1 (11.7)	40.9 (4.9)	31.0 (−0.6)	21.3 (−5.9)	37.7 (3.2)
Source: PRISM

=== Ridge and Valley Region ===
According to the Trewartha climate classification system, the lower elevation Ridge and Valley section of Monroe County has a Temperate Continental climate (Dc) with hot summers (a), cold winters (o) and year-around precipitation (Dcao). Dcao climates are characterized by at least one month having an average mean temperature ≤ 32.0 °F (0.0 °C), four to seven months with an average mean temperature ≥ 50.0 °F (10.0 °C), at least one month with an average mean temperature ≥ 72.0 °F (22.2 °C) and no significant precipitation difference between seasons. Although most summer days are slightly humid in the Ridge and Valley, episodes of heat and high humidity can occur with heat index values > 102 °F (39 °C). Since 1981, the highest air temperature was 100.3 °F (37.9 °C) on July 22, 2011, and the highest daily average mean dew point was 72.7 °F (22.6 °C) on January 8, 2006. July is the peak month for thunderstorm activity which correlates with the average warmest month of the year. The average wettest month is September which correlates with tropical storm remnants during the peak of the Atlantic hurricane season. Since 1981, the wettest calendar day was 6.36 inches (162 mm) on August 10, 2005. During the winter months, the plant hardiness zone is 6a with an average annual extreme minimum air temperature of −5.4 °F (−20.8 °C). Since 1981, the coldest air temperature was −18.0 °F (−27.8 °C) on January 21, 1994. Episodes of extreme cold and wind can occur with wind chill values < −17 °F (−27 °C). The average snowiest month is January which correlates with the average coldest month of the year. Ice storms and large snowstorms depositing ≥ 12 inches (30 cm) of snow occur once every couple of years, particularly during nor'easters from December through March.

Climate data for East Stroudsburg, Elevation 531 ft (162 m), 1981–2010 normals, extremes 1981–2018
Month	Jan	Feb	Mar	Apr	May	Jun	Jul	Aug	Sep	Oct	Nov	Dec	Year
Record high °F (°C)	68.6 (20.3)	77.0 (25.0)	86.3 (30.2)	94.4 (34.7)	94.5 (34.7)	95.3 (35.2)	100.3 (37.9)	98.7 (37.1)	96.3 (35.7)	87.9 (31.1)	79.5 (26.4)	71.1 (21.7)	100.3 (37.9)
Mean daily maximum °F (°C)	36.1 (2.3)	39.8 (4.3)	48.8 (9.3)	61.6 (16.4)	71.9 (22.2)	79.9 (26.6)	83.9 (28.8)	82.3 (27.9)	75.1 (23.9)	63.6 (17.6)	52.3 (11.3)	40.4 (4.7)	61.4 (16.3)
Daily mean °F (°C)	27.0 (−2.8)	29.9 (−1.2)	37.9 (3.3)	49.2 (9.6)	59.3 (15.2)	68.0 (20.0)	72.4 (22.4)	70.9 (21.6)	63.5 (17.5)	51.9 (11.1)	42.3 (5.7)	31.9 (−0.1)	50.4 (10.2)
Mean daily minimum °F (°C)	17.9 (−7.8)	20.1 (−6.6)	27.0 (−2.8)	36.9 (2.7)	46.7 (8.2)	56.1 (13.4)	60.9 (16.1)	59.5 (15.3)	51.9 (11.1)	40.3 (4.6)	32.3 (0.2)	23.4 (−4.8)	39.5 (4.2)
Record low °F (°C)	−18.0 (−27.8)	−8.6 (−22.6)	−0.5 (−18.1)	14.3 (−9.8)	27.1 (−2.7)	36.4 (2.4)	42.6 (5.9)	38.0 (3.3)	29.8 (−1.2)	19.8 (−6.8)	6.1 (−14.4)	−7.1 (−21.7)	−18.0 (−27.8)
Average precipitation inches (mm)	3.40 (86)	2.97 (75)	3.64 (92)	4.11 (104)	4.43 (113)	4.48 (114)	4.52 (115)	4.41 (112)	4.97 (126)	4.77 (121)	4.02 (102)	4.09 (104)	49.81 (1,265)
Average snowfall inches (cm)	11.8 (30)	8.5 (22)	8.8 (22)	2.1 (5.3)	0.0 (0.0)	0.0 (0.0)	0.0 (0.0)	0.0 (0.0)	0.0 (0.0)	0.1 (0.25)	2.2 (5.6)	7.1 (18)	40.6 (103)
Average relative humidity (%)	69.1	64.3	59.6	57.4	61.8	68.9	68.9	71.7	72.8	71.0	69.4	70.5	67.1
Average dew point °F (°C)	18.2 (−7.7)	19.3 (−7.1)	25.1 (−3.8)	34.8 (1.6)	46.2 (7.9)	57.4 (14.1)	61.6 (16.4)	61.3 (16.3)	54.6 (12.6)	42.8 (6.0)	33.0 (0.6)	23.4 (−4.8)	39.9 (4.4)
Source: PRISM

== Ecology ==
=== Long Pond ===
Long Pond is an inland freshwater wetland.

The Nature Conservancy's Hauser Nature Center is a destination for hiking and ecological tourism in Long Pond.

=== Pocono Plateau Region ===
According to the A. W. Kuchler U.S. potential natural vegetation types, the higher elevation Pocono Plateau Region of Monroe County would have a dominant vegetation type of Northern Hardwood (106) with a dominant vegetation form of Northern hardwood forest (26). The peak spring bloom typically occurs in early-May and peak fall color usually occurs in early-October. The plant hardiness zone is 5b with an average annual extreme minimum air temperature of −11.2 °F (−24.0 °C).

=== Ridge and Valley Region ===
According to the A. W. Kuchler U.S. potential natural vegetation types, the lower elevation Ridge and Valley section of Monroe County would have a dominant vegetation type of Appalachian Oak (104) with a dominant vegetation form of Eastern Hardwood Forest (25). The peak spring bloom typically occurs in late-April and peak fall color usually occurs in mid-October. The plant hardiness zone is 6a with an average annual extreme minimum air temperature of −5.4 °F (−20.8 °C).

=== Glacial Till Barrens ===
Located in the vicinity of Big Pocono State Park, Blakeslee, and Long pond. The Glacial Till Barrens are best exeplified by the Long Pond Conservation Easement. Which has public access trail systems. Glacial Till Barrens are found in Dixon Miller State Forest, and within the Bethlehem Authority property. One of the only such ecosystems in the entire state of Pennsylvania. The Glacial till barrens are mesic (meaning moist), and yet have species that are more typical of far northern climates.

== See also ==
- National Register of Historic Places listings in Monroe County, Pennsylvania
