= Pleasant Valley School District (Pennsylvania) =

School district in Pennsylvania

Coordinates: 40.9214°N 75.4189°W

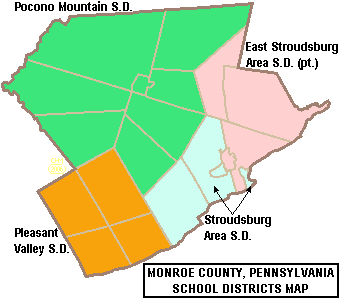
- Pleasant Valley School District shown in orange

Address
- One School Lane Rte. 115 Brodheadsville, Monroe County, Pennsylvania, 18322; United States

District information
- Type: Public
- Grades: K–12

Students and staff
- District mascot: Bears

Other information
- Website: https://www.pvbears.org/

Pleasant Valley School District is a mid-sized, rural, public school district in the west end of Monroe County, Pennsylvania in the United States. The district encompasses approximately 114 square miles (300 km^{2}) including: Chestnuthill, Eldred, Polk, and Ross Townships, as well as communities in them, such as Brodheadsville. As of 2000, the school district served a resident population of 29,051.

By 2010, the U.S. Census Bureau reported the district's population increased to 33,891 people. In 2009, the district residents' per capita income was $19,853, while the median family income was $51,433. In the Commonwealth, the median family income was $49,501 and the United States median family income was $49,445, in 2010. The educational attainment levels for the school district population (25 years old and over) were 89.5% high school graduates and 17.9% college graduates.

== Schools ==
The district operates four schools.

- Pleasant Valley Elementary School K-2
- Pleasant Valley Intermediate School 3-5
- Pleasant Valley Middle School 6-8
- Pleasant Valley High School 9-12

High school students may choose to attend Monroe Career and Tech Institute for training. The Colonial Intermediate Unit IU20 provides the district with a wide variety of services, including specialized education for disabled students and hearing, speech and visual disability services and professional development for staff and faculty.

== Extracurriculars ==
The Pleasant Valley School District offers a wide variety of clubs, activities and an extensive sports program.

=== Sports ===
The district funds:

Varsity

Boys

- Baseball - AAAA
- Basketball- AAAA
- Cross country - AAA
- Football - AAAA
- Golf - AAA
- Lacrosse - AAA
- Soccer - AAA
- Tennis - AAA
- Track and field - AAA
- Wrestling - AAA

Girls

- Basketball - AAAA
- Cheer - AAAA
- Cross country - AAA
- Field hockey - AAA
- Lacrosse - AAA
- Soccer - AAA
- Softball - AAAA
- Tennis - AAA
- Track and field - AAA
- Volleyball - AAA

Middle school sports

Boys

- Basketball
- Cross country
- Football
- Soccer
- Track and field
- Wrestling

Girls

- Basketball
- Cross country
- Field hockey
- Soccer
- Softball
- Track and field
- Volleyball

According to PIAA directory July 2013
