= Brodheadsville, Pennsylvania =

Unincorporated community in Pennsylvania, US

- Census-designated place
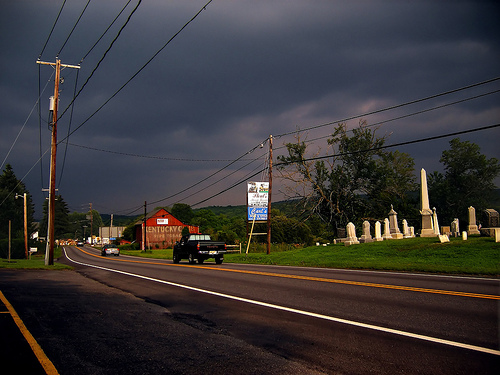
- Entering Brodheadsville

- Location of Brodheadsville in Pennsylvania Brodheadsville, Pennsylvania (the United States)
- Coordinates: 40°55′36″N 75°24′17″W
- Country: United States
- State: Pennsylvania
- County: Monroe
- Township: Chestnuthill

Area
  - Total: 4.32 sq mi (11.18 km^{2})
  - Land: 4.28 sq mi (11.08 km^{2})
  - Water: 0.042 sq mi (0.11 km^{2})
- Elevation: 745 ft (227 m)

Population (2020)
  - Total: 1,700
  - Density: 397.5/sq mi (153.49/km^{2})
- Time zone: UTC-5 (EST)
  - Summer (DST): UTC-4 (EDT)
- ZIP code: 18322
- Area code(s): 570
- FIPS code: 42-09000

Brodheadsville is a census-designated place (CDP) in Chestnuthill Township, Monroe County, Pennsylvania, United States. The population was 1,700 at the 2020 census. The community is served by Pleasant Valley School District.

== Geography ==
Brodheadsville is located at 40°55′36″N 75°24′17″W (40.926724, -75.404707).

According to the United States Census Bureau, the CDP has a total area of 4.3 square miles (11 km^{2}), of which 4.3 square miles (11.1 km^{2}) is land and 0.04 square miles (0.10 km^{2}) (0.93%) is water.

Pennsylvania Route 115 and 715's southern termini are on U.S. Route 209 in Brodheadsville. Route 115 provides access from Wilkes-Barre and 715 provides access from Henryville, while U.S. 209 provides access from Lehighton and Stroudsburg.

== Demographics ==
Historical population
Census	Pop.	Note	%±
2000	1,637		—
2010	1,800		10.0%
2020	1,700		−5.6%
U.S. Decennial Census

As of the census of 2000, there were 1,637 people, 602 households, and 461 families residing in the CDP. The population density was 382.8 inhabitants per square mile (147.8/km^{2}). There were 667 housing units at an average density of 156.0 per square mile (60.2/km^{2}). The racial makeup of the CDP was 93.77% White, 2.50% African American, 0.12% Native American, 1.47% Asian, 0.43% from other races, and 1.71% from two or more races. Hispanic or Latino of any race were 2.87% of the population.

There were 602 households, out of which 35.4% had children under the age of 18 living with them, 64.8% were married couples living together, 9.5% had a female householder with no husband present, and 23.3% were non-families. 18.9% of all households were made up of individuals, and 7.0% had someone living alone who was 65 years of age or older. The average household size was 2.71 and the average family size was 3.10.

In the CDP, the population was spread out, with 26.0% under the age of 18, 8.2% from 18 to 24, 27.3% from 25 to 44, 25.7% from 45 to 64, and 12.8% who were 65 years of age or older. The median age was 38 years. For every 100 females, there were 101.6 males. For every 100 females age 18 and over, there were 93.5 males.

The median income for a household in the CDP was $46,389, and the median income for a family was $52,333. Males had a median income of $47,986 versus $21,250 for females. The per capita income for the CDP was $24,140. About 3.3% of families and 9.2% of the population were below the poverty line, including 6.4% of those under age 18 and none of those age 65 or over.

== Education ==
It is in the Pleasant Valley School District.

== History ==
Brodheadsville, was once known as the village of Shafer's. The village was renamed on June 28, 1852, in honor of Charles D. Brodhead, a Stroudsburg resident and Pennsylvania House representative of Monroe and Pike Counties who moved to Chestnuthill Township and established a post office.

== Transportation ==
Brodheadsville is in the MCTA Orange Flex service area.
