= Shelby (name) =

Shelby is a surname and may also be a given name. The surname's origin is obscure, but may derive from Middle English salwe (“willow, sallow”) + -by (“settlement, farm”).

Notable people with the name include:

== People with the name ==
=== Given name ===
- Shelby (given name)
- Shelby Lee Adams (born 1950), American photographer
- Shelby Babcock (born 1992), American softball player
- Shelby Bach (born 1986), American children's writer
- Shelby Blackstock (born 1990), American racing driver
- Shelby Brewer (1937–2015), American nuclear engineer
- Shelby Chesnes (born 1991), American former Playboy playmate,
- Shelby Bryan (born 1946), American technology executive
- Shelby Chong (born 1948), American comedian, actress, and producer
- Shelby Ivey Christie, American fashion and costume historian
- Shelby Coffey III (born 1946/1947), American journalist and business executive
- Shelby Moore Cullom (1829–1914), member of the U.S. House of Representatives and Senate, and 17th Governor of Illinois
- Shelby Cullom Davis (1909–1994), American investment banker, philanthropist and United States Ambassador to Switzerland
- Shelby Davis (born 1937), American money manager; son of Shelby Cullom Davis
- Shelby Dressel (born 1990), American singer-songwriter
- Shelby Earl (born 1976), American singer-songwriter
- Shelby Fero (born 1993), American comedian and screenwriter
- Shelby Flint (born 1939), American singer-songwriter
- Shelby Foote (1916–2005), American historian and novelist
- Shelby Gaines (fl. mid-1990s), American musician and visual artist
- Shelby Grant (1936–2011), American actress born Brenda Thompson
- Shelby Harris (born 1991), American football player
- Shelby Millard Harrison (1881–1970), American social scientist
- Shelby Hearon (1931–2016), American writer
- Shelby Highsmith (1929–2015), American federal judge
- Shelby Hogan (born 1998), American soccer goalkeeper
- Shelby Holliday (fl. 2008), American television journalist
- Shelby Houlihan (born 1993), American runner
- Shelby Howard (born 1985), American racing driver
- Shelby Hughes (1981–2014), American artist and designer
- Shelby D. Hunt (1939–2022), American business theorist
- Shelby J. (born 1972), American singer-songwriter
- Shelby Jacobs (1935–2022), American engineer
- Shelby James (born 1973), American sport cyclist
- Shelby Jordan (1952–2022), American football player
- Shelby Kisiel (born 1994), American rhythmic gymnast
- Shelby Kutty (fl. 1990s), Indian-born American cardiologist
- Shelby A. Laxson (1913–1982), American politician
- Shelby F. Lewis, American political scientist and scholar
- Shelby Lindley (born 1986), American voice actress
- Shelby Linville (1929–2008), American basketball player
- Shelby Lynne (born 1968), American singer-songwriter
- Shelby Lyons (born 1981), American retired figure skater
- Shelby Metcalf (1930–2007), American basketball coach
- Shelby Miller (born 1990), American baseball pitcher
- Shelby Pierson (fl. mid-1990s), American intelligence official
- Shelby Rabara (born 1983), American actress and dancer
- Shelby Rogers (born 1992), American tennis player
- Shelby Sherritt, Australian ceramicist
- Shelby Singleton (1931–2009), American record producer and record label owner
- Shelby Starner (1984–2003), American singer-songwriter and musician
- Shelby Steele (born 1946), American author, columnist, documentary film maker and academic
- Shelby G. Tilford (1937–2022), American scientist
- Shelby Tracy Tom (1963–2003), Canadian female murder victim
- Shelby Tucker (born 1935), American lawyer and journalist
- Shelby Walker (1937–2006), American boxer
- Shelby Westbrook (1922–2016), American aviator and Tuskegee Airman
- Shelby White (born 1938), American investor, art collector, and philanthropist
- Shelby Whitfield (1935–2013), American sportscaster
- Shelby Wilson (born 1937), American wrestler and 1960 Olympic gold medalist
- Shelby Young (born 1992), American actress

=== Surname ===
- Annette Shelby (1939–2025), American academic
- Carroll Shelby (1923–2012), automobile racer, designer and entrepreneur
- Charlotte Shelby (1877–1957), Broadway actress
- Don Shelby (born 1947), news anchor who popularized the Pratt-Shelby knot, a method for tying a necktie
- Isaac Shelby (1750–1826), first and fifth Governor of Kentucky
- Jane S. Richardson (born 1941), née Shelby, American biophysicist who developed protein ribbon diagrams
- Joseph O. Shelby (1830–1897), Confederate States Army general during the American Civil War
- John Shelby (born 1958), former Major League Baseball player
- Lon R. Shelby (1935–2018), American academic
- Margaret Shelby (1900–1939), American stage and motion picture actress
- Patricia Walton Shelby (1928–2002), American civic leader
- Richard Shelby (born 1934), United States Senator from Alabama, formerly a United States Representative and an Alabama state senator
- Thomas Shelby (disambiguation)

== Fictional characters ==
- Shelby, an earthworm character in the animated series Adventure Time
- Shelby (dog), Clark Kent's dog in the TV series Smallville
- Shelby, the family name of the principal gangsters featured in the BBC TV series Peaky Blinders and the name of their family business
- Tommy Shelby, main character and gangster-politician in Peaky Blinders (TV series)
- Shelby Corcoran, in the TV series Glee
- Shelby Cummings, in the film A Cinderella Story
- Shelby Eatenton-Latcherie, in the play Steel Magnolias and its film adaptation
- Shelby Marcus, from Best Friends Whenever
- Shelby Marx, in the episode iFight Shelby Marx from the Nickelodeon TV series iCarly played by Victoria Justice
- Shelby Merrick, in the TV series Higher Ground
- Shelby Watkins, in the TV series Power Rangers Dino Charge
- Shelby Wyatt, in the TV series Quantico
- Shelby Woo, in the TV series The Mystery Files of Shelby Woo
- Shelby, from The Wolves of Mercy Falls
