= Shelby (given name) =

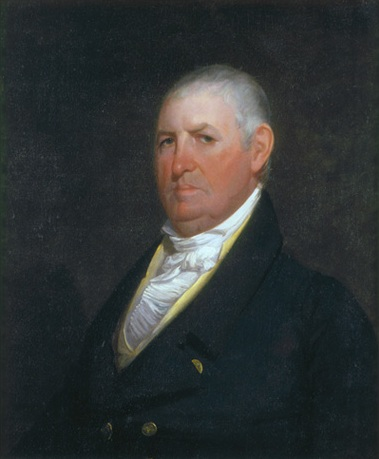
- Isaac Shelby, the first governor of Kentucky.
- Gender: Unisex
- Language: English

Origin
- Meaning: Transferred use of English surname

Shelby is a given name, a transferred use of the northern English surname. Its meaning is uncertain. It has been in use as a given name, mainly in North America, since the 1700s. Initial usage for boys was probably influenced by Isaac Shelby (1750-1826), a United States Revolutionary War commander and later governor of Kentucky. Usage for girls has been influenced by its use for the character Shelby Barret Wyatt in the 1935 film The Woman in Red and the character Shelby Eatonten-Latcherie in the 1989 film Steel Magnolias.

== People ==
=== Men ===
- Shelby Lee Adams (born 1950), American photographer
- Shelby Blackstock (born 1990), American racing driver
- Shelby Brewer (1937–2015), American nuclear engineer
- Shelby Bryan (born 1946), American technology executive
- Shelby Coffey III (born 1946/1947), American journalist and business executive
- Shelby Moore Cullom (1829–1914), member of the U.S. House of Representatives and Senate, and 17th Governor of Illinois
- Shelby Cullom Davis (1909–1994), American investment banker, philanthropist and United States Ambassador to Switzerland
- Shelby Davis (born 1937), American money manager; son of Shelby Cullom Davis
- Shelby Foote (1916–2005), American historian and novelist
- Shelby Gaines (fl. mid-1990s), American musician and visual artist
- Shelby Harris (born 1991), American football player
- Shelby Millard Harrison (1881–1970), American social scientist
- Shelby Highsmith (1929–2015), American federal judge
- Shelby Howard (born 1985), American racing driver
- Shelby D. Hunt (1939–2022), American business theorist
- Shelby Jacobs (1935–2022), American engineer
- Shelby James (born 1973), American sport cyclist
- Shelby Jordan (1952–2022), American football player
- Shelby Kutty (fl. 1990s), Indian-born American cardiologist
- Shelby A. Laxson (1913–1982), American politician
- Shelby Linville (1929–2008), American basketball player
- Shelby Metcalf (1930–2007), American basketball coach
- Shelby Miller (born 1990), American baseball pitcher
- Shelby Singleton (1931–2009), American record producer and record label owner
- Shelby Steele (born 1946), American author, columnist, documentary film maker and academic
- Shelby G. Tilford (1937–2022), American scientist
- Shelby Tucker (born 1935), American lawyer and journalist
- Shelby Westbrook (1922–2016), American aviator and Tuskegee Airman
- Shelby Whitfield (1935–2013), American sportscaster
- Shelby Wilson (born 1937), American wrestler and 1960 Olympic gold medalist

=== Women ===
- Shelby Babcock (born 1992), American softball player
- Shelby Bach (born 1986), American children's writer
- Shelby Chong (born 1948), American comedian, actress, and producer
- Shelby Ivey Christie, American fashion and costume historian
- Shelby Dressel (born 1990), American singer-songwriter
- Shelby Earl (born 1976), American singer-songwriter
- Shelby Fero (born 1993), American comedian and screenwriter
- Shelby Flint (born 1939), American singer-songwriter
- Shelby Grant (1936–2011), American actress born Brenda Thompson
- Shelby Hearon (1931–2016), American writer
- Shelby Hogan (born 1998), American soccer goalkeeper
- Shelby Holliday (fl. 2008), American television journalist
- Shelby Houlihan (born 1993), American runner
- Shelby Hughes (1981–2014), American artist and designer
- Shelby Johnson, known as Shelby J. (born 1972), American singer-songwriter
- Shelby Kimball, American politician
- Shelby Kisiel (born 1994), American rhythmic gymnast
- Shelby F. Lewis, American political scientist and scholar
- Shelby Lindley (born 1986), American voice actress
- Shelby Lynne (born 1968), American singer-songwriter
- Shelby Lyons (born 1981), American retired figure skater
- Shelby Pierson (fl. mid-1990s), American intelligence official
- Shelby Rabara (born 1983), American actress and dancer
- Shelby Rogers (born 1992), American tennis player
- Shelby Sherritt, Australian ceramicist
- Shelby Starner (1984–2003), American singer-songwriter and musician
- Shelby Tracy Tom (1963–2003), Canadian female murder victim
- Shelby Walker (1975-2006), American boxer
- Shelby Young (born 1992), American actress. •{this is a different person} shelby lynn Harrington (2017) english actress
