= Los Angeles Times suburban sections =

Aspect of LA Times publication history

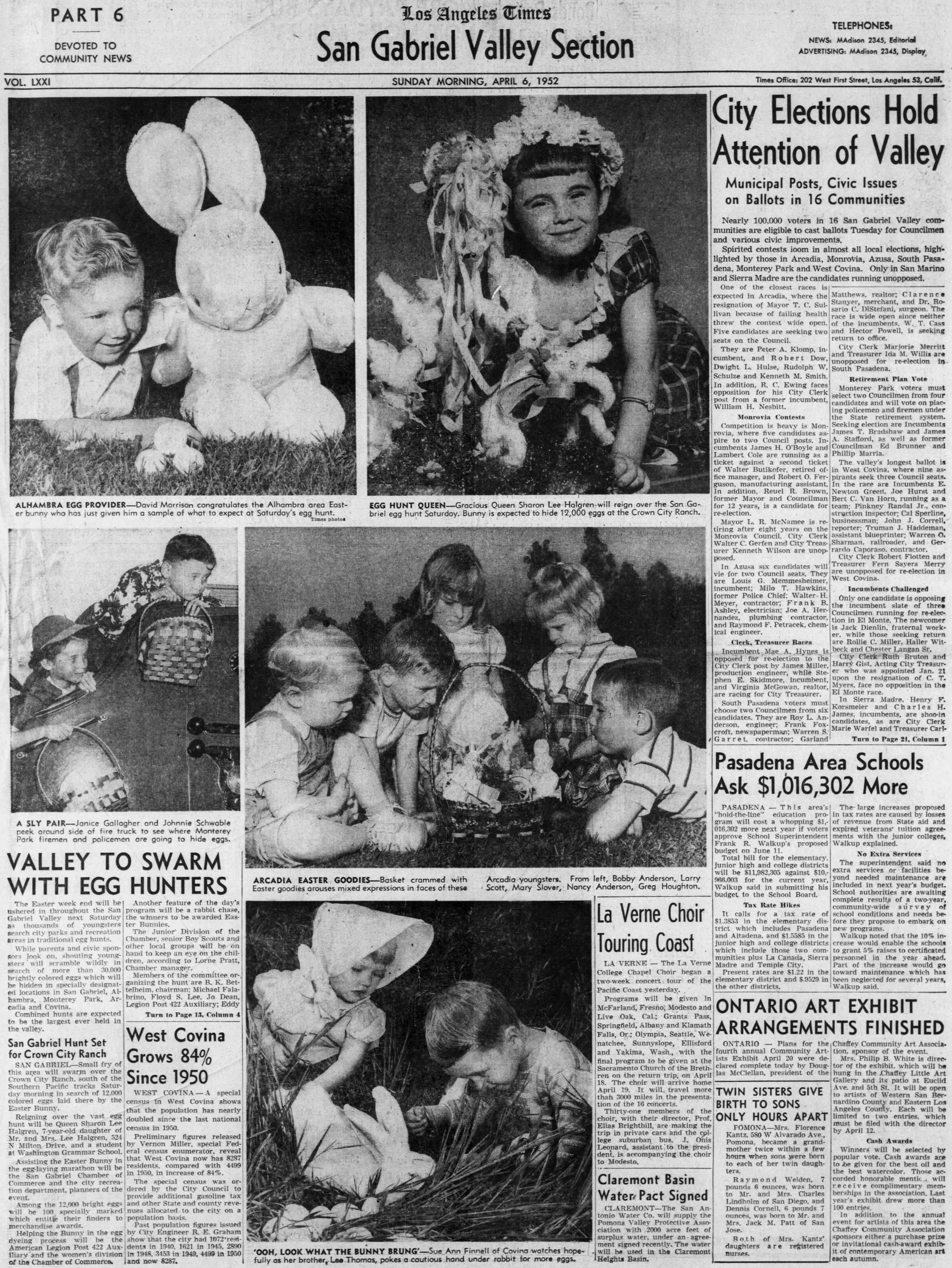
First issue of a Los Angeles Times suburban section, published on April 6, 1952

The Los Angeles Times suburban sections or zone sections were printed between 1952 and 2001 as adjuncts to the main newspaper to cover the news of and sell advertising space in various parts of Southern California that the Times considered to be in the prime part of its circulation area. The giant Los Angeles daily had a "more aggressive zoning policy than perhaps any other newspaper" because its local market was so widespread, a writer for The New York Times opined. But as two of these and six other specialized sections were eliminated in 1995 because of a downturn in newspaper revenues, Times editor Shelby Coffey called them simply "a noble experiment."

== Growth ==
The first zoned section was published on Sundays only for the San Gabriel Valley in April 1952 under the direction of Mike Straszer, who was in charge of all succeeding zoned editions until 1958. An editorial in the Times's San Gabriel Valley section explained that

. . . the Southland has grown so rapidly it has been impossible to pay specific attention to every community in the Sunday paper. . . . Consequently the idea of "zoning" was born. This means that papers delivered to a certain area are to contain a special section devoted to the particular interest of that area. The San Gabriel Valley Section is the first of these.

The next zoned editions were opened in the San Fernando Valley and in the Glendale areas on March 4, 1956. A one-year anniversary layout listed the names of key people working on the San Fernando section as Straszer, Maurice Stoller, Mary Nogueras, Albert Markado, Norman Dash, Richard W. Degnon and Fred Baumberger.

By the end of April 1957, zoned editions were appearing in the San Gabriel Valley (since 1952), Southern Communities (around 1954), Orange County (1954), the San Fernando Valley (1956), Glendale-Verdugo Hills (1956), as well as the newest sections, the Westside (1957) and Centinela-South Bay (1957).

In November 1958, a copy of the Centinela-South Bay section that carried a story about the 50th anniversary of Inglewood, California, was placed in a time capsule beneath the cornerstone of the Inglewood City Hall "with the expectation it will be opened in the year 2008."

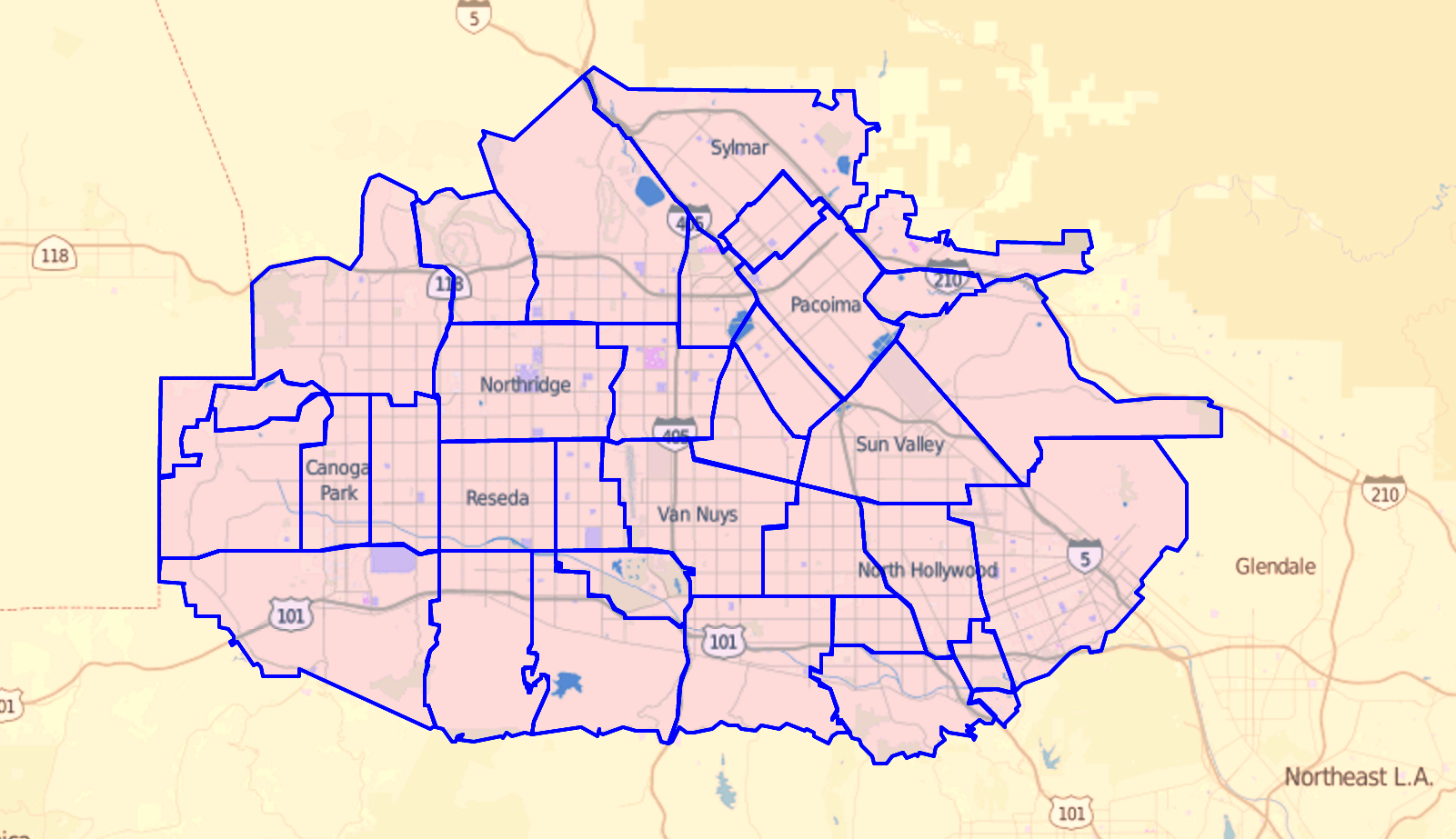
Neighborhoods in the San Fernando Valley

The frequency of the San Fernando Valley section was expanded in April 1960 to twice a week — on Thursdays and Sundays. That same twice-weekly schedule was adopted for the Westside section in April 1961. Times editor Nick B. Williams wrote about the suburban editions in that year:

. . . they publish almost no crime news, no sensational or scandalous information, . . . they concentrate on community development, club news, social news and the normal, active lives of average and above-average citizens.

By 1968, the experience of the weekly zoned editions had generally been positive — but Orange County, to the south of Los Angeles was a different matter. In that year its population stood at 1.29 million and, according to Time magazine,

Times publisher Otis Chandler watched the [suburban sections] process with growing dissatisfaction, then decided that the only solution is for a newspaper to grow the way a modern city-community grows. . . . an ever-expanding circle of satellite towns, with citizens showing an increased interest in local affairs. To give them the local news they want, Chandler decided there was no substitute for being on the spot. The result appeared last week: the Orange County edition, edited, printed and partly written by a 32-man Times satellite staff operating entirely in Orange County.

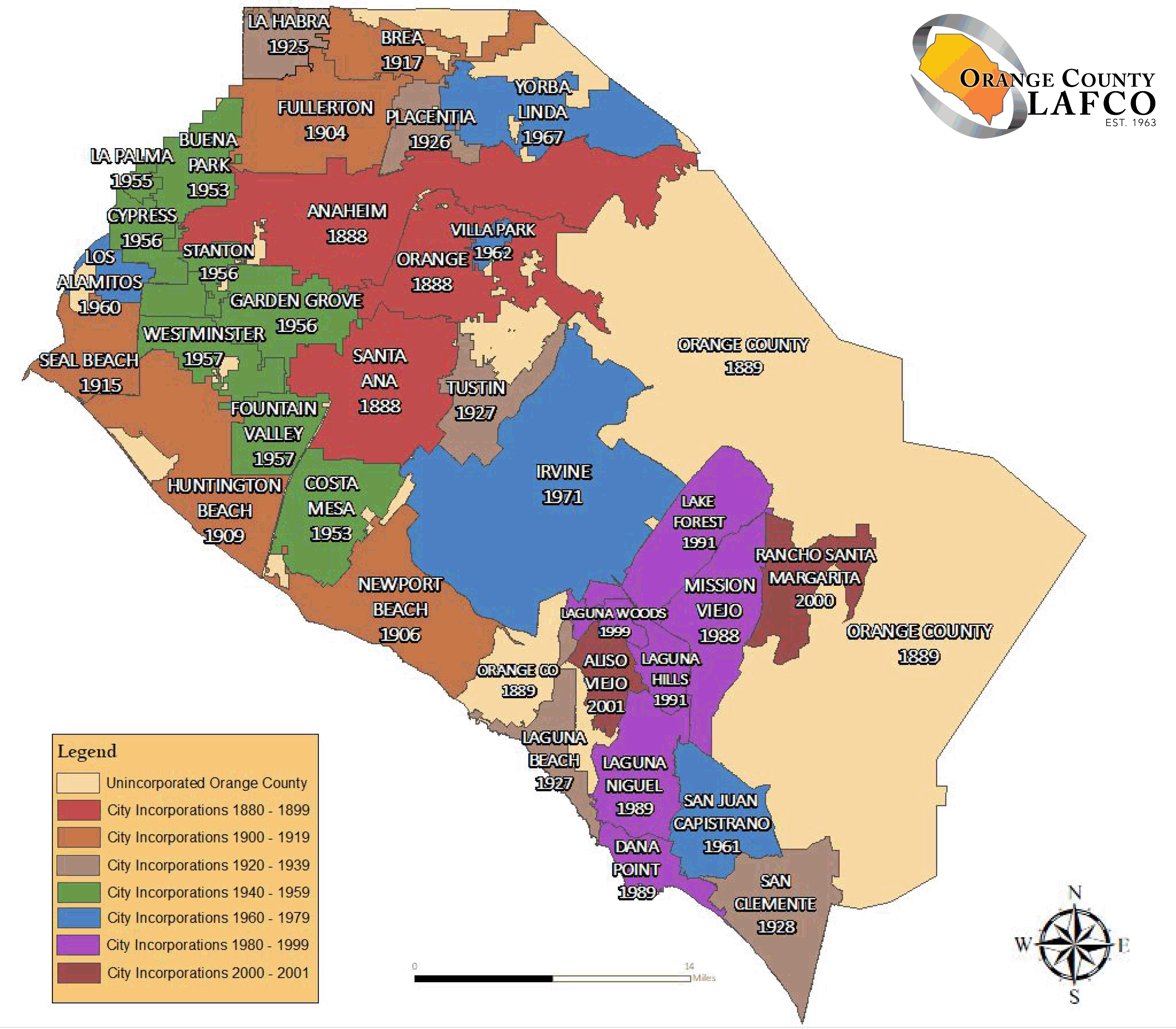
Cities within Orange County, 2008

Under the direction of Orange County managing editor Ted Weegar, a separate editorial staff — including a reporter stationed in Sacramento, the state capital, each day took apart the editorial product prepared in Los Angeles and "Orafied" — or localized — the entire newspaper, from front page to sports, especially for Orange County readers. The result was printed in and distributed from a modern, $7 million printing plant in Costa Mesa in Orange County. The cost was estimated to be some $9.5 million a year "to give suburbanites and exurbanites the feeling that they are reading a world-minded paper with a home-town emphasis." Times publisher Chandler was quoted as saying that satellite publishing, as it was called, "seems to make sense in metropolitan markets, where papers are interested in furthering their economic base, away from the center city."

In April 1978, the Times began a daily San Diego County edition, with a 26-person news staff, plus advertising and circulation employees.

A shake-up in the Times editorial department in April 1981 resulted in the transfer of H. Durant Osborne, 52, from his job as city editor of the main newspaper to "an administrative role in the Suburban Community Sections." Osborne was to work under Reece, who remained Suburban Sections editor. The move, among others, was billed as a way to "intensify coverage." Journalist Leo Wolinsky recalled that Osborne

would assign these ridiculous stories. He once had someone cover the marathon and write stories about runners who would stop to defecate in the bushes. He's have you go out and put a nickel, a dime and a quarter on the sidewalk and when someone would stop and pick one up, you were supposed to interview them and write a story about what they picked up and why. I thought, "This can't be the famous L.A. Times."

In 1983, Robert Rawitch replaced Art Berman as Suburban Sections editor, and by November 1993, William Rood was the editor of the sections.

New York Times reporter Alex S. Jones reported in 1990 that there had developed a struggle between "traditionalists," who wanted all Times subscribers to receive "essentially the same newspaper," and those who sought to "Orafy" the whole paper, "in looks and local focus." In that year, a new edition was started in Ventura County, northwest of Los Angeles, and a weekly Spanish-language publication called El Tiempo was also being planned.

Traditionalists were opposed to expanding the existing San Fernando Valley zoned pages into a semi-independent publication with its own focus and its own printing plant. That circumstance had been completed by 1989, when Jeffrey S. Hall, vice president of marketing for the Times was named to a new position of president of the San Fernando Valley edition, directing business operations there. The editorship remained with Charles Carter, who reported to Suburban Editor Robert Rawitch. The edition had a circulation of 230,827 daily and 266,373 Sundays. In 1997, Julia C. Wilson was named president of both the San Fernando Valley and Ventura editions, succeeding Jeffrey S. Klein.

== Minorities ==
In a 1990 investigation of minority recruitment at the Los Angeles Times, journalism investigative reporter David Shaw found that the zone sections had become "a training ground of sorts for the main paper" and that that practice had "helped create the paper's poor reputation with minorities" because they had to start in a suburban office rather than downtown.

During the 1992 Rodney King Riots, African American reporters who were working on the suburban sections were "hastily dispatched into trouble spots while the predominantly white Metro staff stayed in the newsroom," according to Greg Braxton, one of those black reporters. Many of them felt they were "cannon fodder," Braxton wrote.

"When the danger had largely subsided, most of us were unceremoniously sent back to our offices without thanks," he wrote.

Afterward, Times editor Shelby Coffey III and publisher David Laventhol gave the green light to establishing an entirely new kind of zoned section — City Times, a 28-page tabloid covering the central city neighborhoods "from Hispanic East Los Angeles to Koreatown to mostly black South Central and Southwest Los Angeles." Mary Lou Felton, a 28-year-old Latina who lived in the riot area, was chosen to head the venture editorially. The new section made heavy use of color to distinguish it from the Times' other zoned sections. Sports was covered extensively.

Ed Cray wrote in the American Journalism Review:

The majority of the cover stories deal with cross-community, cross-neighborhood problems: check-cashing services as a banking system for the poor; the true cost of enterprise zones in South Los Angeles; the largely Anglo command of the Los Angeles Police Department; school vandalism; and the pervasive fear of crime on central city bus lines.

City Times cost $1.5 million annually and was not profitable. It had a low penetration in the central city, with many copies just given away.

== Decline ==
On November 6, 1992, the Times announced it would stop publishing its San Diego County edition and eliminate 500 jobs throughout the company through a voluntary buyout and normal attrition. A New York Times reporter called the move "the result of an advertising slump in Southern California" which accompanied "the retrenchment of the military and aerospace industries" and said

San Diego County adjoins the Mexican border at Baja California.

Industry analysts described the actions as drastic. . . . while other papers have scaled back zoned editions, analysts could not name another big newspaper that had closed one. . . . The Times has been unable to stop suburban newspapers from gaining market share in areas like Orange County . . . and the San Fernando Valley . . . regions The Times once presumed were part of its empire. . . . in hard economic times, advertisers cut back their zoned newspaper advertising because they view it as secondary to the coverage they can get in local papers.

"Otis Chandler's dream of being a newspaper from Santa Barbara to Tijuana isn't going to happen in this economy," Phyllis Pfeiffer, the edition's general manager, said.

In January 1994 the zones were downsized again when publication frequency was reduced to once a week from four times in the South Bay and from twice weekly in the San Gabriel and Southeast/Long Beach sections. "The Westside section, serving the city's most affluent areas, including Beverly Hills and Westwood, will continue to appear twice a week," the New York Times reported.

In 1995, the San Fernando Valley staff was reduced "significantly."

By 1999, the suburban sections had been almost entirely supplanted by a new venture, Our Times, a Los Angeles Times subsidiary that published separate community-oriented newspapers in Brea, Conejo Valley, the Crenshaw District in Los Angeles, Montebello and Pico Rivera, Irvine, Laguna Hills, Mission Viejo, Santa Clarita, Santa Monica, Sherman Oaks, Simi Valley and Ventura. But in 2000 the Times announced it would discontinue publication of its 14 Our Times community news sections.

Finally, in September 2001 the Times ended publication of its zoned San Gabriel Valley, South Bay and Westside sections. The cuts "signaled another blow to an ambitious effort by the Times to take on what Publisher John Puerner and Editor John Carroll described as block-by-block community news coverage," according to the trade source NewsInc. The big-city daily would thenceforth leave community coverage up to six smaller newspapers published by a subsidiary, Times Community News.

In 2001, the San Fernando Valley section was replaced by "a new California section that added regional coverage and reduced the Valley emphasis," according to an investigative story about Valley newspaper coverage by David Shaw. "The change eliminated the separate Valley editorials, op-ed articles and some local features."

In 2002, the newspaper was criticized for relegating coverage of the secession movement in the San Fernando Valley to the San Fernando Valley zoned edition. Leo Wolinsky, Times deputy managing editor, said it was the Times' "faulty system" that "Balkanized" the newspaper's local coverage and resulted in "two journalistic bureaucracies fighting each other."

The Times did continue publishing five separate, regionally focused editions for wider geographic areas — the Los Angeles metropolis, the San Fernando Valley, Orange County, Ventura County and the Inland Empire of Riverside and San Bernardino counties.

In December 2005, the newspaper announced it would close its Chatsworth plant, where the San Fernando Valley and Ventura County editions had been published. The Times ended printing at its Costa Mesa Orange County plant in June 2010 but kept its editorial and business operations open there.

== Reputation ==
James O'Shea, the Times editor in 2008, said that suburban section reporters were referred to as "zonies," and reporter Kathy Kristof recalled that "The editors downtown were a little snooty about taking stories from the bureaus." She said that "the zones were considered somewhat of a backwater."

== Notable staffers ==
- Rick Corrales, assigned to the Southeast suburban section and then to Nuestro Tiempo
- Al Martinez, whose columns in the San Fernando Valley and Westside editions made him one of the top three essay columnists named by the National Society of Newspaper Columnists in 1987 He later won a Pulitzer Prize.
