= Shelby Holliday =

American journalist

- Born: Denver, Colorado, United States
- Education: University of San Diego
- Occupations: Video and print journalist
- Organization: The Wall Street Journal

Shelby Holliday is a senior video reporter for the Wall Street Journal, based in New York City, and focusing on that region, on business and finance, and on politics (as of September 2022).

== Early life and education ==
Holliday was born and grew up in Denver, Colorado. After high school, she attended the University of San Diego (USD).

When a freshman-year back injury prevented her from acting on a plan to play basketball with the USD Toreros, she turned to a "wide range" of other student activities. Around a study abroad period (in Spain), she was a member of Alpha Phi sorority, and was involved in producing and anchoring programs for the university's student-run television station, USDtv, a part of USD Media. She also "pursued numerous internships and jobs" alongside her course work, and explored "her passion for broadcast journalism" in an internship at San Diego's NBC station. Holliday earned an undergraduate degree in business administration, graduating in 2008.

== Career ==
As described in interview, Holliday states that she began her post-graduate career as a reporter for Gen-Y news in Columbus, Ohio, for a college network "just getting off the ground", Palestra.net. In her reporting there, she and a co-worker investigated cases of alleged voter fraud in Ohio during the 2008 presidential election. In interview, Holliday describes the experience as formative, in its developing in her "a passion for investigative journalism" and an "appreciation for the power of journalism", noting that "[s]ome... voters were later prosecuted", and that Ohio law was changed "to close problematic loopholes". In that time, which she describes in interview as being "an incredible experience", she states that she was assigned to cover major events that included the 2008 Democratic and Republican National Conventions, the Kentucky Derby, New York Fashion Week, and the Sundance Film Festival, and that in doing so, she was given opportunity to contribute to "various Fox News and Fox Business shows". After Palestra, she reported for UWIRE, a college news network in partnership with News Corp, and appeared on "various Fox News and Fox Business platforms, and... co-hosted the live-streaming Fox News 'Strategy Room' leading up to the 2008 presidential election".

By at least 2010, Holliday had joined Channel One News in New York City, working as a reporter and host, "where she traveled around the world to educate... youth about current events and international affairs", stating in interview that she was "grateful for the opportunity to cover issues affecting our nation's youth". She anchored for them in that period, through 2014, a Channel One role that earlier had been occupied by many individuals—Anderson Cooper, Lisa Ling, Serena Altschul, Tracy Smith, Seth Doane, and Maria Menounos—e.g., that went on to award-winning major media positions. There, international news producing and reporting credits included stories on Typhoon Haiyan in the Philippines, on Nelson Mandela's funeral in South Africa, on military tribunals at the Guantanamo Bay detention center, and on China's rise to global power (2014).

In 2014, Holliday became a reporter for Bloomberg Television, working in New York City. As of September 2022, she was a senior video reporter for the Wall Street Journal, based in New York City, and focusing on that region, on business and finance, and on politics.

== Awards and recognition ==
Holliday won a Bronze Telly award for Channel One in 2014 for a multi-part series reporting on China's rise to global power.

A WSJ team of which Holliday was a part, led by Joe Palazzolo, Michael Rothfeld, and Lukas Alpert, was a nominee and finalist for their reporting over the period of 2016-2018 of the series, "Trump’s Hush Money", for the 2019 Goldsmith Prize for Investigative Reporting, a prize that went, that year, to J. David McSwane and Andrew Chavez of the Dallas Morning News (for their series "Pain and Profit").
