= Bartonsville, Pennsylvania =

Unincorporated community in Pennsylvania, US

- Unincorporated community
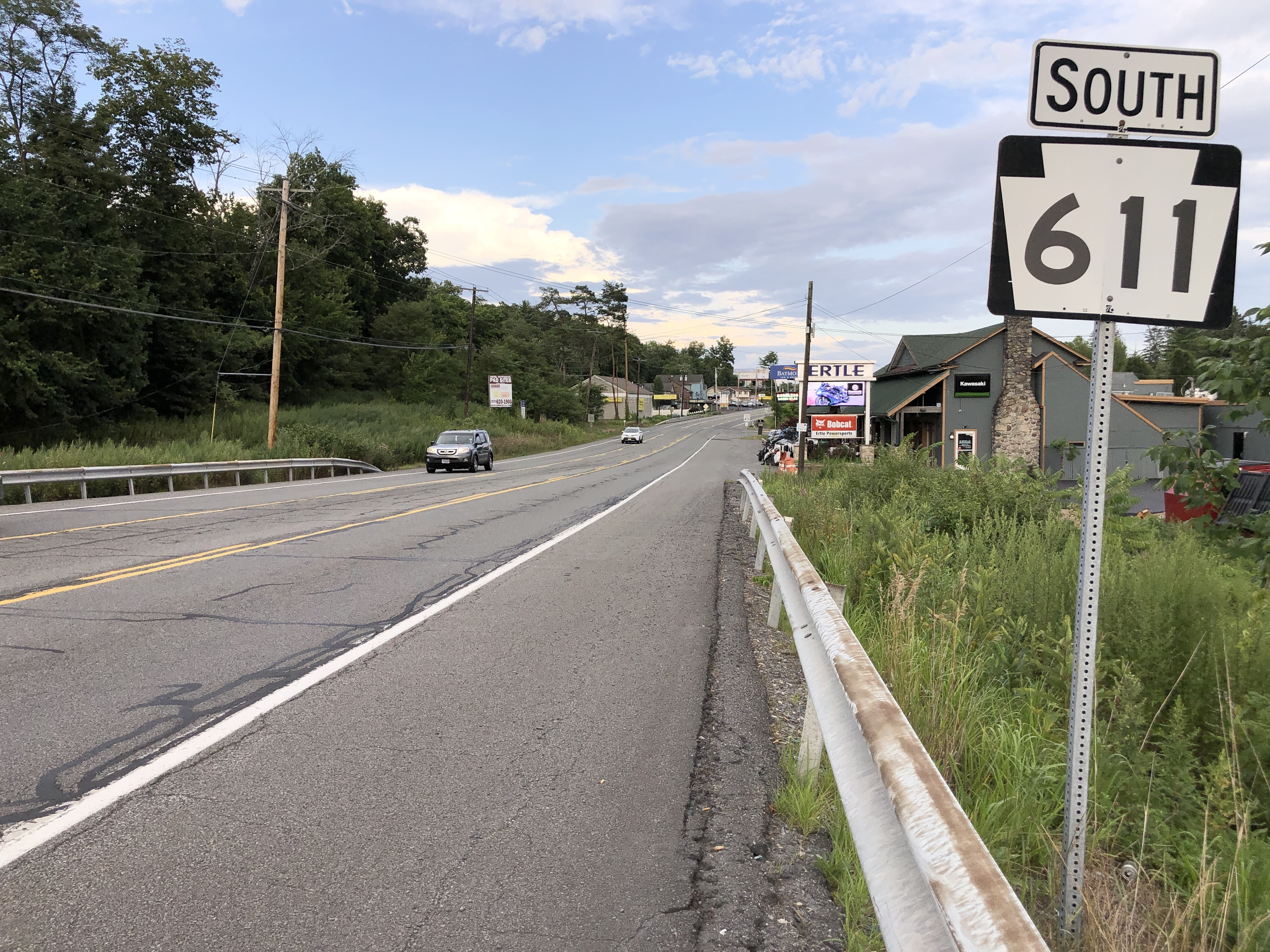
- PA 611 through Bartonsville

- Location within Pennsylvania Location within the United States
- Coordinates: 41°00′18″N 75°16′47″W
- Country: United States
- State: Pennsylvania
- County: Monroe
- Townships: Hamilton, Pocono, Stroud, and Jackson
- Elevation: 774 ft (236 m)
- Time zone: UTC-5 (Eastern (EST))
  - Summer (DST): UTC-4 (EDT)
- ZIP code: 18321
- Area codes: 570 and 272
- GNIS feature ID: 1168787

Bartonsville is an unincorporated community in the Hamilton, Pocono, Jackson, and Stroud townships in Monroe County, Pennsylvania, United States.

== History ==
Bartonsville was founded in 1831 by Colonel Joseph Benjamin Barton when he opened up a hotel and post office along the Easton-Belmont Turnpike stagecoach route. Barton settled along this profitable transportation route after running an ice cream parlor in East Stroudsburg, Pennsylvania for several years. After residing and giving his name to the community, Barton eventually pulled up stakes and travelled further north, eventually founding the borough of Waymart in Wayne County, Pennsylvania. The result of his move is that the only Barton buried in Custard's Cemetery (the principal and one of only two cemeteries in or near the community) is his daughter Lydia Barton, who remained in Bartonsville after his departure, but never married. The community could easily have been called Custardsville, since the Custard family settled in the area shortly after Barton, opening a sawmill on the Pocono Creek, and eventually establishing a Lutheran church (a daughter church of the Hamilton Union Church in Hamilton Square, Pennsylvania). The Custard family also gave land for a school and a cemetery. At the turn of the 20th century, Bartonsville was the typical, small Mid-Atlantic community, including two one-room school houses (due to the multiple townships in which it is located), a gristmill, a tannery and barkshed, a grand, rambling hotel (Barton's by then called the Forest Inn), a creamery, general store, post office and cobbler. The community also boasted a dance hall, brass band and a baseball team.

== Today ==
Today, Bartonsville has become an urbanized bedroom community. Passing through the Bartonsville area is Pennsylvania Route 611, which is lined with modern shopping centers and subdivisions, among them Barton Glen, Tara Hills, Pocono Laurel Lake, Fawn Acres, and Buck Valley. Largely a bedroom community today, retail and hospitality industries make up most of the village's economic activity. The village's ZIP code is 18321, which according to the US Census https://www.census.gov had a population of 1,753 in 2000.

== Notable person ==
- Shelby Starner, singer-songwriter, and musician
