= Thomas Shelby =

Thomas Shelby may refer to:

- Thomas Shelby, musician in the American band Lakeside
- Tom Shelby (fl. 1856, founder of Shelby, Mississippi, U.S.
- Tommie Shelby (born 1967), American philosopher
- Tommy Shelby, a fictional character from Peaky Blinders

== See also ==
- Thomas Shelby House, a historic home near Lexington, in Lafayette County, Missouri, U.S.
