= Michael Rothfeld =

American journalist and writer

- Education: Columbia University (BA, MSJ)
- Occupation: Journalist
- Organization: The New York Times
- Relatives: Eric Rothfeld (brother)
- Awards: George Polk Award (2011)

Michael Rothfeld is an American journalist and writer. He was a leader of The Wall Street Journal reporting team that won the Pulitzer Prize for National Reporting in 2019.

== Biography ==
Rothfeld graduated from Columbia University in 1993 and Columbia University Graduate School of Journalism in 1998.

He started his journalism career by working for the Manhattan Spirit as an unpaid intern, eventually rising to become the newspaper's editor before departing for Columbia's journalism school in 1997. He then joined The Philadelphia Inquirer as a suburban correspondent before spending seven years at Newsday on Long Island, New York covering local and state government.

He was statehouse reporter at The Los Angeles Times from 2007 to 2010. From 2010 to 2019, he was an investigate reporter at The Wall Street Journal. He was among a group of Journal reporters to win a George Polk Award for coverage of insider trading in 2011.

Rothfeld was a lead contributor to the coverage of President Donald Trump’s hush-money payments during the 2016 campaigns to suppress the stories of two women who claimed to have had affairs with him, leading to a 2019 Pulitzer Prize for National Reporting for his reporting team.

In 2019, Rothfeld joined the metro desk of The New York Times as an investigative reporter.

He co-authored the 2020 book The Fixers with his colleague Joe Palazzolo on their Pulitzer-winning coverage.
