= Kathy Kristof =

Kathy Kristof (born February 4, 1960) is an American journalist and author who has covered personal finance, consumer issues, and the gig economy. She has worked for publications and media organizations including the Los Angeles Times, CBS News, Reuters, Forbes, and Kiplinger Personal Finance. She is also the founder of SideHusl.com, a website covering freelance and gig-work platforms.

== Biography ==
After graduating from the University of Southern California, Kristof covered banking for the Los Angeles Business Journal before joining the Los Angeles Times in 1989. She covered personal finance and related subjects, and in 1991 took over Sylvia Porter's syndicated financial column, which was distributed nationally.

After leaving the Los Angeles Times in 2008, Kristof worked as a freelance journalist and contributed to publications including CBS News, Reuters, Forbes, and Kiplinger Personal Finance. She has also written several books, including Kathy Kristof's Complete Book of Dollars and Sense, Investing 101, and Taming the Tuition Tiger.

In 2018, Kristof founded SideHusl.com, a website that reviews and provides information about online freelance and gig-work platforms, including their fees, compensation, and working arrangements.

Kristof has received several journalism and consumer-education awards, including the John Hancock Business Writing Award, the Consumer Federation of America's Betty Furness Consumer Media Service Award,
