= Shelby Babcock =

American softball player

Personal information
- Born: February 26, 1992 (age 34) Broomfield, Colorado, U.S.
- Height: 5 ft 10 in (1.78 m)

Sport
- Country: United States
- Sport: Softball
- College team: Arizona Wildcats

Shelby Jean Babcock (born February 26, 1992) is an American, former collegiate right-handed softball pitcher originally from Broomfield, Colorado. She attended Legacy High School. She attended the University of Arizona, where she was a starting pitcher for the Arizona Wildcats softball team from 2011 to 2014. Babcock currently teaches pitching in Colorado.

== Arizona Wildcats ==
Babcock debuted on February 11, 2011, against the Utah Utes, tossing 5 innings with three strikeouts for a victory. As a sophomore, she set career season bests in nearly every category: wins, strikeouts, shutouts, innings pitched, ERA and WHIP. Babcock opened the 2012 season by beating the McNeese State Cowgirls on February 9 with a career high 9 strikeouts in regulation. On March 3, Babcock no-hit the Charleston Cougars with 6 strikeouts in a run-rule victory. Finally on April 14, Babcock defeated the No. 1 California Golden Bears with a 6 strikeout, three-hitter. In 2013, the junior went 10 innings to best the UCLA Bruins and set a career best with 10 strikeouts on April 18. For her final year in 2014, Babcock pitched in limited appearances but set a career best in strikeout ratio (6.3). She suffered her only loss that year in her final appearance in the NCAA Super Regional for the Wildcats. She tossed 6 innings and struck out 5 against the ULL Ragin' Cajuns on May 24.

== Statistics ==
=== University of Arizona Wildcats ===
| YEAR | W | L | GP | GS | CG | SHO | SV | IP | H | R | ER | BB | SO | ERA | WHIP |
| 2011 | 14 | 8 | 38 | 26 | 13 | 3 | 0 | 170.2 | 179 | 108 | 97 | 129 | 117 | 3.99 | 1.81 |
| 2012 | 20 | 10 | 39 | 31 | 23 | 7 | 1 | 197.0 | 179 | 89 | 85 | 100 | 164 | 3.02 | 1.41 |
| 2013 | 16 | 12 | 36 | 25 | 13 | 1 | 1 | 171.1 | 189 | 121 | 95 | 100 | 132 | 3.88 | 1.69 |
| 2014 | 6 | 1 | 23 | 10 | 3 | 1 | 2 | 62.0 | 74 | 49 | 48 | 45 | 56 | 5.42 | 1.92 |
| TOTALS | 56 | 31 | 136 | 92 | 52 | 12 | 4 | 601.0 | 621 | 367 | 325 | 374 | 469 | 3.78 | 1.65 |
