= Shelby Hughes =

American painter

- Born: 1981
- Died: June 21, 2014 (aged 32–33); Midwest City
- Education: Cooper Union
- Known for: Jynxies Natural Habitat
- Partner: Bryan VanAssche

Shelby L. Hughes (1981 – ca. June 21, 2014) was an American artist and designer. Her works have been exhibited internationally and are included in the collection of the Museum of Modern Art in New York City.

After her death in an unsolved murder in June 2014, Hughes was revealed to have been "Dequincey Jynxie," the founder of Jynxies Natural Habitat, a peer-reviewed blog cataloguing the stamp art on glassine heroin bags and rating the quality of the accompanying product, which had received media attention in the years preceding her death.

== Early life and career ==
Shelby Hughes was born in Maine and lived there until moving to Beverly, Massachusetts at the age of ten. There, she graduated from Beverly High School in 1998. Showing a talent for art from an early age, Hughes pursued art studies at Cooper Union in New York City with a full scholarship. After completing her BFA in 2003, she exhibited her work internationally in New York, Miami, Berlin, and Tokyo and had her exhibitions covered by such publications as Artforum and Village Voice. Six of her works were included in the Judith Rothschild Foundation at the Museum of Modern Art (MOMA) in New York. Hughes subsequently moved to California to work as a designer for Old Navy, before relocating to New York City and eventually Oklahoma, where she continued working as a freelance designer of handbags and accessories.

Hughes developed a heroin habit in the 2000s and is thought to have met her partner, fellow artist Bryan VanAssche, through an online heroin user community.

== Jynxies Natural Habitat ==
In April 2009, under the pseudonym "Dequincey Jynxie," Hughes started Jynxies Natural Habitat, a blog and photo archive of stamps on glassine heroin bags distributed in the Brooklyn and Manhattan area where she lived at the time. Due to her background in fine art, Hughes' original interest was in the stamp art and branding of heroin; however, each entry was also accompanied by a review of the product contained in the bag, with a rating for “count” (the amount in each baggie), “legs,” (the duration of the high), and “rush” (the overall quality). Hughes also opened the blog to entries from readers, seeing it as a form of harm-reduction, as contributors could share their experiences with particularly dangerous brands.

In March 2012, Hughes (under the name of "Dequincey Jynxie" and without revealing her true identity) gave an interview to Vice magazine about her project. More media scrutiny followed in winter 2014, after the death of Philip Seymour Hoffman from an overdose, with dozens of heroin baggies labeled "Ace of Hearts" (a brand positively reviewed on the blog) discovered next to his body. New York Magazine described Jynxies Natural Habitat as being "like Yelp, but for heroin" and published an interview with Dequincey Jynxie. The blog also received coverage from The Toronto Star, which criticized it as "nothing more than brand promotion with product reviews," and The Brooklyn Paper.

By the time Jynxies Natural Habitat became the focus of media attention in 2014, Hughes had left New York and entered recovery, leaving the blog in the hands of an active contributor known as "Eve." After Hughes' death, "Eve" was locked out of the main administrative account but kept the blog running until August 2015, when she announced she would stop updates and keep Jynxies Natural Habitat as a permanent archive.

== Death ==
On June 21, 2014, the bodies of Shelby Hughes and her partner Bryan VanAssche were found by firefighters after the couple's house in Midwest City, Oklahoma had been set on fire. The police stated that the couple had been murdered several days prior to the fire, with Hughes dying from blunt force trauma to the head, and suspected that the deaths had been drug-related. The couple had entered a rehabilitation program shortly before.

The murderer was never found. In 2015, a friend of the couple's pleaded guilty of breaking into their house before the fire and stealing heroin, but was not implicated in the murder.
