= Shelby Earl =

American singer-songwriter

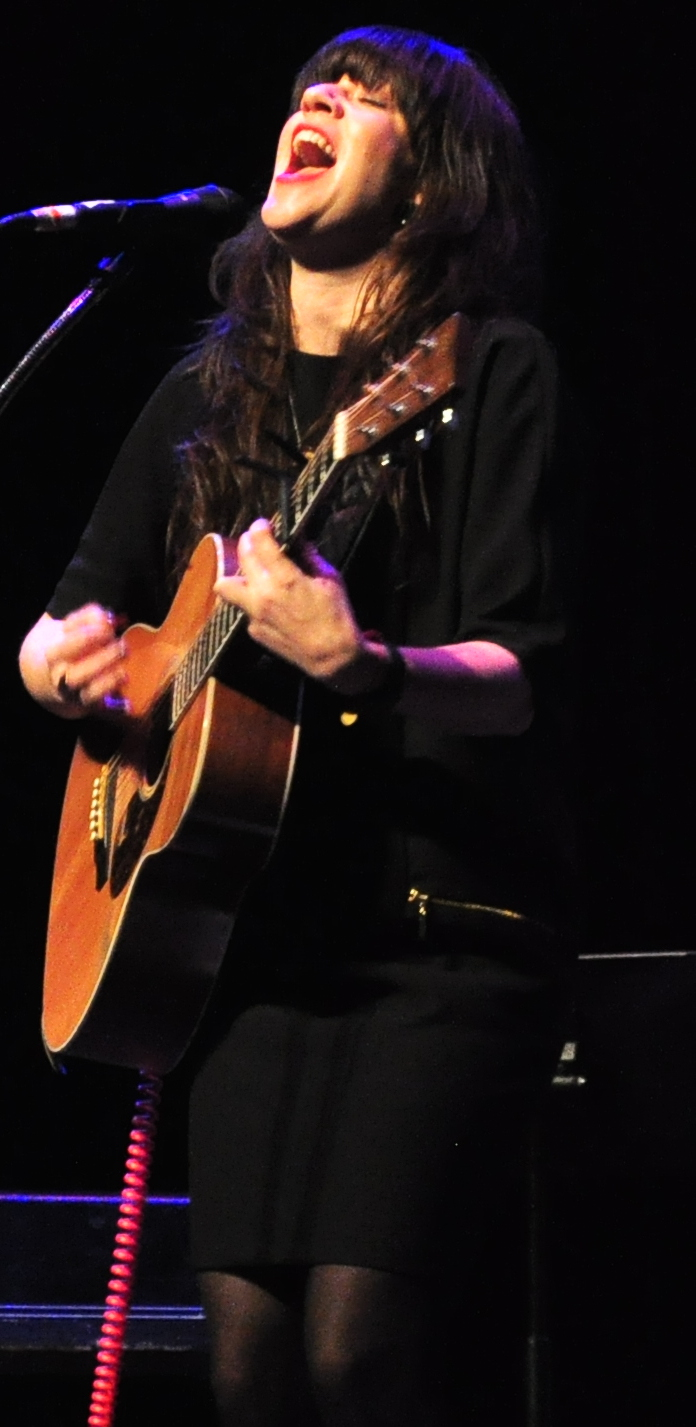
- Shelby Earl performing at the Pantages Theatre (Tacoma, Washington)

Background information
- Born: Olympia, Washington, U.S.
- Genres: Indie Rock, Songwriter
- Occupation: Musician
- Instruments: vocals, guitar
- Years active: 2005 -
- Label: Nine Mile Records
- Website: www.shelbyearl.com

Shelby Earl is an American singer-songwriter and musician based in Seattle, Washington. Earl's first solo album, Burn the Boats, was produced by John Roderick (featuring members of Telekinesis, The Long Winters, Fleet Foxes and more) and released on Local 638 Records (owned and operated by Visqueen's Rachel Flotard). In 2011 NPR's Ann Powers named Earl her "new favorite songwriter" and Amazon.com dubbed her album the "#1 Outstanding 2011 Album You Might Have Missed".

== Career ==
Since the release of her debut album, Earl has opened for Benjamin Gibbard of Death Cab For Cutie, Loudon Wainwright III, Rhett Miller of the Old 97s, Crooked Fingers, Lavender Diamond, The White Buffalo, Felice Brothers, Tom Brosseau, Aaron Lee Tasjan and more.

In April 2013, Rolling Stone suggested Earl's song "Everyone Belongs to Someone" be included on Zach Braff's Garden State follow-up film.

Earl released her second solo album, Swift Arrows, produced by Seattle indie folk artist Damien Jurado, in July 2013. The album was recorded live at Seattle's Columbia City Theater and was well received by such outlets as NPR ("Music For Folks Who've Been Through a Few Things"), Salon.com ("SXSW: Meet Shelby Earl, the singer you need to know"), and Rolling Stone ("Shelby Earl Comes Out Firing in 'Swift Arrows").

Earl's version of Michael Jackson's "P.Y.T. (Pretty Young Thing)" was featured on the “Everything I Try to Do, Nothing Seems to Turn Out Right” episode of Grey's Anatomy (season 10, episode 23), which aired on May 8, 2014. Jackson was very influential in Earl becoming an artist. The song was produced by Eric Howk.

In May 2014, Earl performed at the Sasquatch! Music Festival and was highlighted in an article as one of "4 Puget Sound Bands to Watch at Sasquatch." In the article she stated: “I've never even submitted to (festival organizer) Adam Zacks before because I just knew that it wasn't time yet. So our conversation where he went ‘Yes, I was gonna ask you,’ was so incredibly exciting for me,” she said. “It definitely feels like a sort of rite of passage to that next level and just a huge honor.”

After Earl's performance, BestNewBands.com listed her in their "6 Great New Bands We Saw At Sasquatch! Day 3" article. In it, they wrote "She’s a raw, refreshing blend of folk, rock, and country, and performs with a very talented backing band who keeps her away from typical singer-songwriter territory (which can get stale for live performances). Earl’s pure voice, capable guitar playing, and strong songwriting should push her to the forefront of Seattle’s folk-rock scene."

Earl's third solo album, The Man Who Made Himself a Name, was released in 2017.
