= Murder of Shelby Tracy Tom =

Murder of a Canadian transgender woman

Shelby Tracy Tom
- Born: 1963
- Died: May 27, 2003 (aged 39–40); North Vancouver, British Columbia, Canada
- Cause of death: Strangulation
- Body discovered: May 31, 2003
- Education: Simon Fraser University

Shelby Tracy Tom (1963–May 27, 2003) was a Canadian transgender woman who was strangled to death in North Vancouver, British Columbia, after 29-year-old Jatin Patel discovered that Tom was transgender during a sexual encounter.

== Personal life ==
Tom lived in Vancouver, British Columbia where she was working as a sex worker in Vancouver's Downtown Eastside. Tom's friends and those who knew her best described her as an intelligent and generous person who loved life and loved her friends.

Tom was often helping those who were underprivileged in the Downtown Eastside and had completed a degree in history from Simon Fraser University the same year of her murder, in hopes of leaving her job as a sex worker and becoming a social worker to help others in the transgender community. Tom's family supported her and loved her deeply.

== Murder ==
On May 27, 2003, Jatin Patel was deported from the United States after completing a jail sentence in that country. Patel was characterised as a man at the time of the murder; she subsequently came out as a transgender woman. On the same day Patel arrived in Canada, she met Tom at a nightclub in Vancouver's Downtown Eastside and Patel stated that she would pay Tom $400 for sex. The two then relocated to Room 214 at the Travelodge Hotel in North Vancouver. While performing oral sex on her, Patel became aware of scarring on Tom's body that she recognized to be from gender confirmation surgery and became enraged, strangling Tom to death.

Patel proceeded to hide Tom's body inside of a closet while she went to find another woman to have sexual relations with. When they arrived back to the hotel, Patel told the second woman that she was considering disposing of Tom's body by throwing it in the ocean, burning it, or chopping it up. Tom's body remained in the closet for 3 days until Patel wrapped her body in a mattress cover and left it in a shopping cart behind a dry cleaning establishment nearby. Tom's body was found on May 31, 2003, four days after her murder.

== Trial and controversy ==
On July 26, 2005, BC Supreme Court Justice Patrick Dohm rejected the application that Tom's murder was a hate crime under the premise that Patel did not intentionally target Tom because of her gender identity, because Patel did not know that Tom identified as a transgender woman when they initially met. This resulted in anger and outrage from the many who believe that this crime was committed with a bias that resulted entirely because of Tom's gender identity and status as a sex worker.

Patel's defense argued that Patel's encounter with Tom caused her to feel rage, betrayal, and personal violation, which ultimately caused her to suffer from posttraumatic stress disorder. The defense also stated that Patel had been sexually assaulted during her sentences over the past 14 years in different U.S. jails, which explained her raging reaction to Tom.

Patel's defense issued a plea bargain for her charge to be dropped from second-degree murder down to manslaughter. This request was approved and Patel was sentenced to a total of 9 years in prison. However, in 2009, after a total of 4 years of jail time, Patel was released from jail and relocated to a halfway house, after she was granted double-time credit for the time she previously served in jail following Tom's murder. Patel was later taken back into police custody after failing to return to the halfway house before curfew. Police suspect Patel was on the Downtown Eastside around other sex workers.

== Remembrance ==
Tom's murder resulted in a great upset for the transgender community and its alliances. A candlelight vigil was held in Tom's honour in Vancouver in June 2013.

== See also ==
- List of solved missing person cases (post-2000)
