= Shelby A. Laxson =

American politician

Shelby Allen Laxson Sr.

Member of the Alabama House of Representatives from the 3rd district
- In office November 9, 1966 – November 4, 1970
- Preceded by: District Created
- Succeeded by: Douglas V. Hale

Member of the Alabama Senate from the 4th district
- In office Abt. 1957 – November 5, 1958
- Preceded by: Vacant
- Succeeded by: David R. Archer

Personal details
- Born: January 16, 1913 Madison County, Alabama
- Died: February 22, 1982 (aged 69)
- Party: Democratic
- Spouse: Valerie Vernon
- Children: 4; 1 died in 1964
- Parent(s): Walter Robert Laxson; Carrie Sewell

Shelby Allen Laxson Sr. (January 16, 1913 - February 22, 1982), also known as Billy Laxson, was an American politician who served as a member of the Alabama House of Representatives from 1966 to 1970.

== Life ==
Laxson was born on January 16, 1913, to Walter Robert Laxson and Carrie Sewell in Huntsville, Alabama. He was educated at the University of Alabama. He married Valerie Vernon on July 21, 1934. They had 4 children together, one of them dying in 1964.

Laxson worked for 30 years as a cotton broker for the Laxson Cotton Company, a family owned business. In his later life he worked as a real estate broker. For 20 years he served as chairman of the Madison County Democratic Executive Committee. He served terms in the Alabama Senate and Alabama House of Representatives (representing district 5).

He died in Huntsville on February 22, 1982, at the age of 69. The cause of death was suicide from a self inflicted gun shot wound to the stomach.

== Politics ==
=== State Senate ===
In about 1957, he finished the unexpired term of Thomas Herman Vann for District 4.

=== State House ===
He was elected for District 3 in 1966. Laxson served in Place 5 of the District. He only served one term.
