= Joe Palazzolo =

American investigative journalist (born 1981)

- Born: Joseph Palazzolo; September 21, 1981 (age 45); St. Louis, Missouri, U.S.
- Education: St. Louis University; Masters degree in journalism from the University of Maryland
- Occupation: Journalist
- Organization: The Wall Street Journal
- Awards: Pulitzer Prize 2019, 2023, and 2025

Joe Palazzolo (born September 21, 1981) is an American investigative journalist. He started working for The Wall Street Journal as a reporter in 2010.

He has investigated corporate misconduct, uncovered conflicts of interest within government, and exposed instances of bribery involving companies pursuing international contracts.

== Biography ==
Palazzolo started his career as a news editor for SLU’s University News and interned at the Baltimore Sun in Washington DC After working as a journalist for Main Justice, covering the US Justice Department he joined the Wall Street Journal in 2010. In 2019, Palazzolo moved to the investigations team of the Wall Street Journal.

Palazzolo and his colleagues at The Wall Street Journal received the Pulitzer Prize in 2019 for National Reporting for their work on payments made during Donald Trump’s 2016 presidential campaign to suppress allegations of sexual misconduct. In 2023, the team was again awarded a Pulitzer for uncovering how senior U.S. officials owned shares in companies they were tasked with regulating. In 2025, Palazzolo earned a third Pulitzer for reporting on Elon Musk, including his political ties, communications with Russian leadership, drug use, and undisclosed financial contributions.

Palazzolo and his colleague Michael Rothfeld were the first to report on the Stormy Daniels payment, launching over a year of follow-up reporting with dozens of exclusives and in-depth investigations. Together they published the book The Fixers on their Pulitzer-winning coverage.

On July 17, 2025 Joe Palazzolo and Khadeeja Safdar published an article alleging that in 2003, Ghislaine Maxwell compiled a leather‑bound album of risqué letters for Jeffrey Epstein’s 50th birthday. Among the contributors was Donald Trump, according to documents obtained by the WSJ. The next day, Trump filed a defamation lawsuit in the U.S. District Court for the Southern District of Florida against The Wall Street Journal, News Corp., and several reporters, including Joseph Palazzolo. The suit references the article. Trump denies authoring the letter and claims the article was intended to damage his reputation.

== Awards ==
- 2019 - Pulitzer Prize for National Reporting
- 2023 - Pulitzer Prize for Investigative Reporting
- 2025 - Pulitzer Prize for National Reporting
