= Shelby G. Tilford =

American scientist (1937–2022)

- Born: January 11, 1937; Kentucky, U.S.
- Died: June 10, 2022 (aged 85)
- Education: Western Kentucky University, Vanderbilt University
- Known for: Science program administration Earth Observing System; U.S. Global Change Research Program
- Awards: Presidential Rank Award; NASA Exceptional Scientific Achievement Medal; William T. Pecora Award
- Scientific career
- Fields: Spectroscopy; Earth science Remote Sensing
- Workplaces: Naval Research Laboratory; National Aeronautics and Space Administration

Shelby G. Tilford (January 11, 1937 – June 10, 2022) was an American atmospheric spectroscopist, Earth scientist, and science program administrator. He retired in 1994 after a long career with the National Aeronautics and Space Administration, most recently serving as the Acting Associate Administrator of NASA's Office of Mission to Planet Earth. He is recognized as one of the main initiators of the Earth system science concept and NASA's Mission to Planet Earth program, which represented NASA's contribution to the U.S. Global Change Research Program (USGCRP).

== Education ==
Tilford majored in chemistry, math and physics at Western Kentucky University, and went on to graduate school at Vanderbilt University where he completed a PhD thesis on spectra of dinitrogen substituted benzene rings. He then moved to the Naval Research Laboratory (NRL) in Washington, DC where he conducted research on spectral lines of atmospheric molecules in the region above 1000 angstroms.

== Career ==
In 1976 Tilford went to NASA Headquarters as a detailee in the Solar Physics program, which led to a position as head of NASA's newly established Upper Atmosphere Research Program (UARP). An important science issue for the UARP was to understand the nature and causes of atmospheric ozone depletion and the impact of chlorofluorocarbons (CFCs). After several years, CFCs were eventually banned on a global scale (see Montreal Protocol). By late 1978, NASA had consolidated all its Earth science research observation components, including atmosphere, oceans, land, solar-terrestrial physics, and the aircraft observations into an integrated Earth Science Division in the Office of Space Science, under Tilford's purview.

At UNISPACE '82 in Vienna (a conference of the United Nations Committee on the Peaceful Uses of Outer Space), Tilford and colleagues, in a NASA delegation led by Administrator James Beggs, proposed a Global Habitability initiative as an international cooperative research effort to obtain data on the Earth's environment, hoping to obtain international support for the concept. However, it was not generally well received. Following this Tilford, with top agency officials formulated the Earth System Science Committee (ESSC) of the NASA Advisory Council, chaired by Francis Bretherton, to put together the foundation for a new comprehensive NASA initiative in Earth science from space. After extensive deliberations amongst the scientific community a final report was released in 1988 (Earth System Science: A Closer View). This set the stage for Tilford's development and leadership of NASA's Earth Observing System (EOS) and the associated data system, the EOS Data and Information System (EOSDIS). As preparation for EOS got underway, Tilford and counterparts in other U.S. agencies with responsibilities in Earth science created the U.S. Global Change Research Program (USGCRP). The USGCRP was established by Presidential initiative in 1989. EOS subsequently received budgetary funding as a new start in 1990, and a new NASA Office of Mission to Planet Earth was created with Tilford as Acting Associate Administrator.

== Awards ==
- Presidential Rank Award (Distinguished Executive), 1993
- William T. Pecora Award, 1992
- NASA Exceptional Scientific Achievement Medal, 1980
- National Council for Science and the Environment (NCSE) Lifetime Achievement Award, 2014
