= Shelby Sherritt =

Australian ceramics artist

- Education: Sydney University
- Occupation: Ceramist

Instagram information
- Page: Shelby Sherritt
- Years active: 2018–present
- Followers: 397 thousand

TikTok information
- Page: Shelby Sherritt
- Years active: 2022–present
- Followers: 1.9 million

YouTube information
- Channel: Shelby Sherritt
- Years active: 2020–present
- Subscribers: 418 thousand
- Views: 124 million
- Last updated: October 13, 2025

Shelby Sherritt is an Australian ceramics artist and TikToker from Ballarat.

== Early life and education ==
Sherritt was raised in Ballarat. Growing up, she enjoyed art as a hobby. She attended Damascus College. As a student she was involved with Aussie Action Abroad and CanTeen Bandanna Day.

Sherritt attended Sydney University.

== Art career ==
Sherritt was diagnosed with a rare form of appendiceal and bowel cancer in 2016, when she was 20. She began working on pottery while undergoing treatment, and went into remission later that year. Her pottery focuses on flora and fauna motifs inspired by the Australian bush, and she has donated to the Australian Wildlife Conservancy.

In April 2020 Sherritt made pottery her full-time job, leaving her job as a social worker. Her business grew during the COVID-19 pandemic. In late 2021 she began selling DIY paint-your-own-pottery kits.

== Online presence ==
Sherritt began posting videos to TikTok in 2022, where she gained traction for her series on mystery slip-cast molds which she got for free on Gumtree. By March 2021 she had accumulated 620,000 followers; by October, this had increased to 1.4 million.

== Awards ==
- 2019: Ballarat Youth Awards, Young Influential Artist
