= Shelby F. Lewis =

American political scientist

- Education: Southern University; University of Massachusetts; University of New Orleans
- Scientific career
- Fields: Political science
- Workplaces: University of New Orleans; Southern University; Atlanta University; University of Zambia; National University of Lesotho; Dillard University; Morris Brown College

Shelby Faye Lewis is an American political scientist and African studies scholar. She was a professor at a series of academic institutions and also worked as an international development consultant, ultimately becoming professor emerita at Clark Atlanta University, where she has also served multiple times as the Interim Dean of the School of Arts and Sciences. In 2010, President Barack Obama appointed her to the J. William Fulbright Foreign Scholarship Board.

== Education ==
Lewis was born in Shreveport, Louisiana. As an undergraduate she attended Southern University, earning a BA in political science in 1960. Upon graduating in 1960, she was named a Woodrow Wilson Fellow by the Woodrow Wilson National Fellowship Foundation. She then earned an MA in political science at the University of Massachusetts in 1963, followed by a PhD in political science from the University of New Orleans in 1973.

== Career ==
Throughout Lewis' professional career, her primary area of research has been applied policy research with a specific focus on the intersection of gender, education, and development policies in developing countries. Lewis believed that Jewel Limar Prestage was her strongest influence as a political scientist due to nurturing her interest in women and politics, gender, education, and development policies. Lewis began her professional career as an education officer for USAID projects in Uganda. In 1962, Lewis became an Education Officer at the Ministry of Education in Uganda, and then from 1965 until 1967 was a Director at the Tororo Girls School in Tororo, Uganda. While in Uganda, she was also part of the Teachers for East Africa Program. She taught at Nabumali High School and worked with British, Ugandan, and American teachers from 1962-1964. Then, she was recruited as Director of Guidance at Tororo Girls' School in Tororo, Uganda from 1965-1967. Even though she studied African history and politics prior to her positions, she had no formal teaching training outside of 1 year as a graduate teaching assistant.

From the late 1960s until the early 1980s, Lewis was a faculty member at a series of institutions, including the University of New Orleans, Southern University, Atlanta University, and the University of Zambia. In 1968, Lewis was on the faculty of Southern University and met Mae King for the first time as a PhD student there. Together, they worked on a conference on African International Studies in Ethiopia as well as research on Hurricane Katrina. In 1983, she was a Senior Fulbright Lecturer at the National University of Lesotho, where she helped to establish the Women's Research Collective. Throughout the 1980s, Lewis taught graduate courses on Education and Development and the Politics of Education.

After a year as a Distinguished Faculty Fellow at the United Negro College Fund, Lewis became an international development consultant, assuming a series of leadership roles in organizations like the Council for International Exchange of Scholars. In 1988 she returned to academia, becoming a professor at Dillard University. In 1989, she moved to Clark Atlanta University, where she would ultimately become a professor emerita. Lewis was twice the Interim Dean of the School of Arts and Sciences at Clark Atlanta University: once from 1989 to 1990, and again in 1993. Between 1995 and 1997, Lewis worked at Morris Brown College as Vice President for Academic Affairs.

In 2010, United States President Barack Obama appointed Shelby F. Lewis to the 12-person J. William Fulbright Foreign Scholarship Board which supervises programs like the Fulbright Program under the Fulbright–Hays Act of 1961.

Lewis served on the inaugural Editorial Advisory Board of the National Review of Black Politics, while affiliated with the African Renaissance and Diaspora Network Board.

In 2018, NAFSA: Association of International Educators awarded Lewis the NAFSA International Education Award for Leadership and Collaboration, which "honors the contributions of an international educator to international exchange on a global scale".
