= Shelby Kutty =

Indian-born American cardiologist and professor

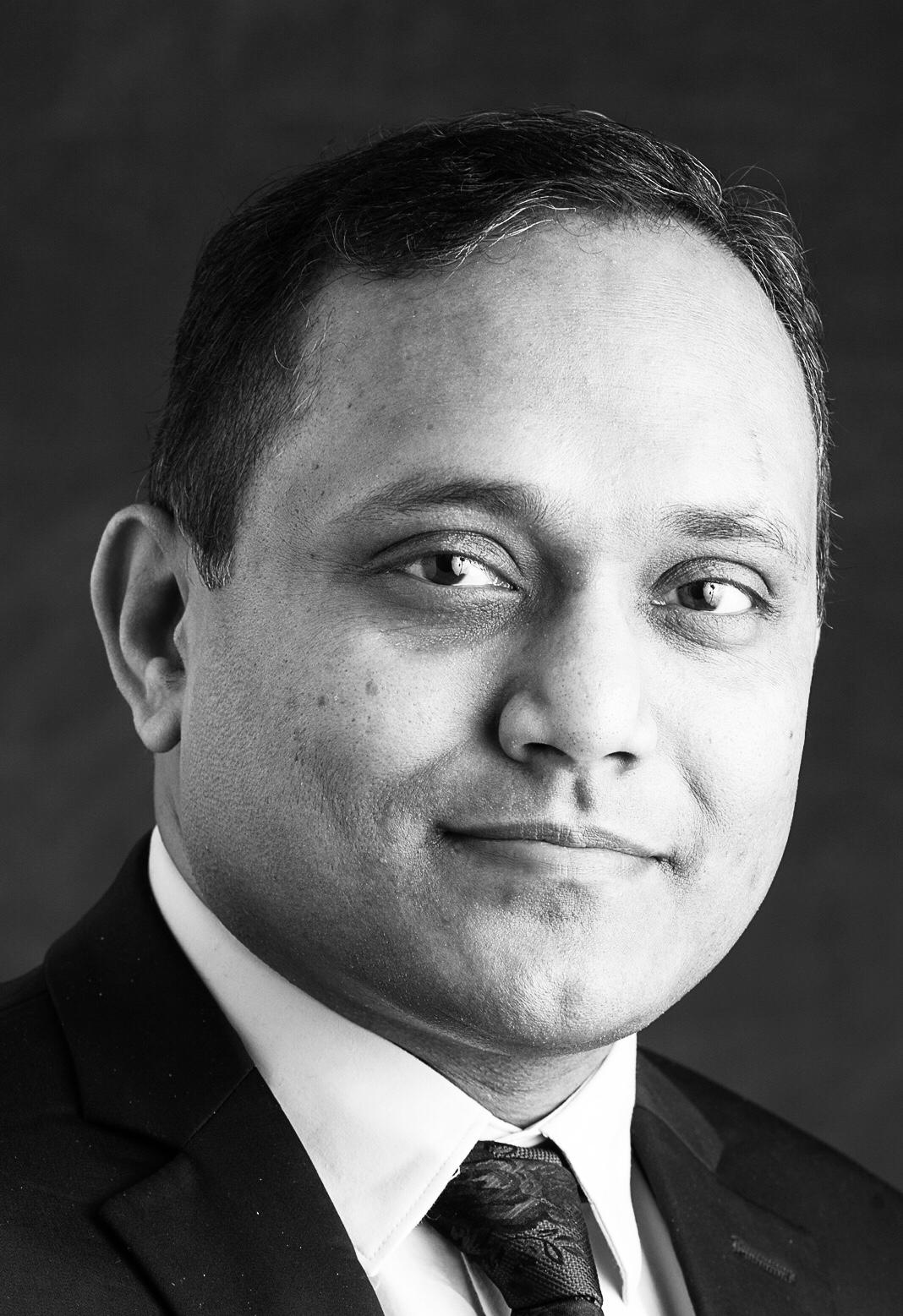
- Born: India
- Education: University of Calicut (MBBS, 1995); Manipal Academy of Higher Education (MD, 1998); University of Nebraska Medical Center (PhD, 2015)
- Occupations: Cardiologist, academic and healthcare executive
- Years active: 1999–present
- Organization: BayCare Health System

Shelby Kutty is an Indian born American cardiologist, academic, and healthcare executive. He currently serves as the System Vice President and Chief Academic Officer at BayCare Health System in Clearwater, Florida.

He has also previously held the titles of assistant dean for research and development and vice chair of pediatrics at the University of Nebraska Medical Center College of Medicine.

At BayCare, Kutty is responsible for academic integrity, graduate medical education expansion, and translational research leadership across a 16 hospital system, in collaboration with Northwestern Medicine, a nonprofit healthcare system affiliated with the Northwestern University Feinberg School of Medicine, in Chicago, Illinois.

Kutty specializes in cardiovascular imaging for children and adults with congenital heart disease, including echocardiography, magnetic resonance imaging (MRI), computed tomography (CT), and preventive cardiology.

== Early life and education ==
Shelby Kutty was born and raised in India.

Kutty obtained his MBBS from the University of Calicut in Kerala, India, an MD from the Manipal Academy of Higher Education in Karnataka and a PhD from the University of Nebraska Medical Center.

== Career ==
=== Early training and career ===
Kutty was a fellow of cardiology at The Royal Children's Hospital in Melbourne, Australia in 1999.

He went to Toronto, Ontario in Canada where he trained as a Departmental Clinical Fellow of Cardiology at the Hospital for Sick Children.

He received his Pediatrics residency training at the Nicklaus Children's Hospital in Miami, Florida and his fellowship training at the Cleveland Clinic in Cleveland, Ohio. He trained at the Boston Children's Hospital as a Fellow of cardiovascular magnetic resonance imaging.

From 2006 to 2007, he was an instructor of pediatrics (cardiology) at the Medical College of Wisconsin in Milwaukee.

From 2008 to 2011, he was an Assistant Professor of Pediatrics (Cardiology), Internal Medicine and Radiology at the University of Nebraska Medical Center.

=== Later career ===
From 2011 to 2017, Kutty was an Associate Professor of Pediatrics, Medicine, and Radiology, as well as the Director of Cardiac Imaging and Research at the University of Nebraska Medical Center and the Children's Hospital & Medical Center in Omaha, Nebraska. From 2017 to 2018, he served as a Professor of Pediatrics, Medicine, Physiology & Radiology, and as the Director of Cardiac Imaging and Research at the University of Nebraska College of Medicine. He was promoted to Vice Chair of Pediatrics in early 2017 and later became the Assistant Dean for Research and Development at the Center.

Kutty left the University of Nebraska College of Medicine in 2018 after an 11-year tenure as a clinician-scientist, following his appointment at Johns Hopkins School of Medicine to lead the Pediatric and Congenital Cardiology program. He contributed to the development of the Blalock-Taussig-Thomas Heart Center at Johns Hopkins Medicine in 2019 and served as co-director. He was the Director of the Helen B. Taussig Heart Center and chair of Cardiovascular Analytic Intelligence Initiative at the Johns Hopkins Hospital, and held an appointment at the Johns Hopkins Bloomberg School of Public Health. Since December 2024, he has been the System Vice President and Chief Academic Officer at BayCare Health System.

== Research and scientific work ==
Kutty's research focuses on investigating myocardial function, right heart disease, and the application of new ultrasound techniques. He has led numerous clinical trials and serves on the editorial boards of international cardiology journals. His work on microbubble contrast agents, ultrasound-mediated cavitation, and targeted ultrasound therapies was funded by the American Heart Association and the National Institute of Health from 2011 to 2018. In 2020 and 2021, Kutty’s team was awarded grants from the National Institutes of Health to lead data science approaches to manage Multisystem Inflammatory Syndrome in Children (MIS-C) and post-acute sequelae associated with SARS-CoV-2 infection.

He serves as the editor of the American Journal of Physiology: Heart and Circulatory Physiology and Cardiology in the Young and as consulting editor for the Journal of Clinical Investigation. Additionally he sits on the editorial boards of several cardiology journals including World Journal of Pediatric and Congenital Heart Surgery, Journal of the American College of Cardiology: Imaging, Journal of the American Society of Echocardiography and Circulation:Cardiovascular Imaging.

== Honors and recognition ==
- Arthur E. Weyman Young Investigator Award (2010) – Awarded by the American Society of Echocardiography for excellence in cardiovascular imaging research.
- Distinguished Scientist Award (2016) – Presented by the University of Nebraska Medical Center for sustained achievement in scientific research.
- Outstanding Achievements in Medicine Award (2022) – Awarded by the Indian American Kerala Cultural and Civic Center (New York) for international impact in cardiovascular care, innovation, and academic medicine.

== Personal life ==
Kutty is originally from Kochi in Kerala, India and currently resides in the United States.

== Selected publications ==
- Kutty, Shelby; Jones, Philip G.; Karels, Quentin; Joseph, Navya; Spertus, John A.; Chan, Paul S. (2 January 2018). "Association of Pediatric Medical Emergency Teams With Hospital Mortality". Circulation. 137 (1): 38–46. doi:10.1161/CIRCULATIONAHA.117.029535. PMC 5839663. PMID 28978554. Keenan, John (2 November 2017). "Study examines efficacy of rapid-response teams" (Press release). University of Nebraska Medical Center.
- Bhaskar, S; Sinha, A; Banach, M; Mittoo, S; Weissert, R; Kass, J S; Rajagopal, S; Pai, A. R; Kutty, S (July 10, 2020) Cytokine storm in COVID-19—immunopathological mechanisms, clinical considerations, and therapeutic approaches: the REPROGRAM consortium position paper. Frontiers in immunology. 11. Frontiers Media SA: 1648.
- Morton, G; Schuster, A; Jogiya, R; Kutty, S; Beerbaum, P; Nagel, E (January 1, 2012) Inter-study reproducibility of cardiovascular magnetic resonance myocardial feature tracking. Journal of Cardiovascular Magnetic Resonance. Vol 14. Issue 1. Elsevier: 34.
- Schuster, A; Hor, K. N; Kowallick, J. T; Beerbaum, P; Kutty, S (April 2016) Cardiovascular magnetic resonance myocardial feature tracking: concepts and clinical applications. Circulation: Cardiovascular Imaging. Vol 9. Issue 4. Lippincott Williams & Wilkins: e004077.
- Porter, T. R; Mulvagh, S. L; Abdelmoneim, S. S; Becher, H; Belcik, J; Bierig, M; Choy, J; Gaibazzi, N; Gillam, L. D; Janardhanan, R; Kutty, S; Leong-Poi, H, Lindner, J. R; Main, M. L; Mathias Jr, W; Park, M. M; Senior, R; Villanueva, F (March 1, 2018) Clinical applications of ultrasonic enhancing agents in echocardiography: 2018 American Society of Echocardiography guidelines update. Journal of the American Society of Echocardiography. Vol 31. Issue 3. Mosby: 241-274.
- Poterucha, J. T; Kutty, S; Lindquist, R. K; Li, L; Eidem, B. W (July 1, 2012) Changes in left ventricular longitudinal strain with anthracycline chemotherapy in adolescents precede subsequent decreased left ventricular ejection fraction. Journal of the American Society of Echocardiography Vol 25. Issue 7. Mosby: 733-740.
- Van den Eynde, Jef; Kutty, Shelby; Danford, David A.; Manlhiot, Cedric (January 2022). "Artificial intelligence in pediatric cardiology: taking baby steps in the big world of data". Current Opinion in Cardiology. 37 (1): 130–136. doi:10.1097/HCO.0000000000000927. PMID 34857721.
- Van den Eynde, Jef; Lachmann, Mark; Laugwitz, Karl-Ludwig; Manlhiot, Cedric; Kutty, Shelby (July 2023). "Successfully implemented artificial intelligence and machine learning applications in cardiology: State-of-the-art review". Trends in Cardiovascular Medicine. 33 (5): 265–271. doi:10.1016/j.tcm.2022.01.010. PMID 35101642.
- Reddy RG, Danford DA, Kutty S. “Leveraging Artificial Intelligence to Bridge the Gap Between Evidence and Practice in Cardiology”. JACC Advances. May 2025
