= Shelby Jacobs =

American engineer

Shelby B. Jacobs (April 27, 1935 – September 5, 2022) was an American engineer known for adapting camera technology that shot the iconic film of the separation between the first and second stages of the Saturn V rocket.

== Career ==
Jacobs spent most of his career at Rockwell (under contract to NASA), starting at Rocketdyne in Canoga Park, California, a division of North American Aviation which became Rockwell International. Jacobs designed engine components, hydraulics, pneumatics and propulsion systems at Rocketdyne for half a decade before transferring to Rockwell Space Division (Downey) as a mechanical engineer in Rocket Propulsion Systems on Apollo/Saturn-II.

In 1965, he was given a special assignment to work on a camera system to film the rocket separation of the Apollo 6 launch. NASA provided the Camera Systems used on prior low Earth orbit programs and requested Rockwell to install camera systems for visual confirmation of extensive Separation Systems analyses and tests. The camera was first launched on Apollo 4, however the film from the Apollo 6 launch on April 4, 1968, coincidentally, the same day civil rights movement leader Martin Luther King Jr. was assassinated, became one of NASA's most known. This footage not only achieved its primary purpose of confirming the performance of Interstage Separation but was among the first to show the curvature of the Earth.

The camera systems were attached to the aft thrust structure of the Saturn-II (second stage); after shooting the film, the camera was ejected. It fell to the ground with parachutes.

Jacobs was also one of the first black engineers hired by NASA and prime contractors. After Apollo Jacobs joined the Space Shuttle program, where he served as Project Engineer responsible for the Space Shuttle Main Engine (SSME) including orbiter/external tank disconnect systems umbilicals. Jacobs was team leader on a proposal for continued production of external tank umbilicals (200 ship-sets) by Rockwell, which led to a promotion to Orbiter Program Office (Executive level) for the final fifteen years of his 40-year aerospace career.

== Recognition ==
Jacobs was celebrated in an exhibition at the Columbia Memorial Space Center in Downey, California.

== Personal life and education ==
Jacobs was born in Texas but spent his childhood in Val Verde, California. He was recognized in high school as an outstanding student, class president, and promising athlete. After scoring well on an aptitude test after high school, he earned a scholarship to UCLA, where he graduated in 1953.

Jacobs was committed to racial justice. As one of few black engineers, Jacobs faced unequal pay and unfair treatment professionally. In 1965, he spent two weeks registering voters in Alabama.

He died in Oceanside, California, on September 5, 2022.
