= Shelby Millard Harrison =

American writer (1881–1970)

Shelby Millard Harrison (1881–1970) was a director of the Russell Sage Foundation, in charge of the Babe Ruth Foundation, as well as a writer. During his career, Harrison also joined the staff of The Survey, lectured at Columbia University's School of Social Work between 1922 and 1932 and directed social studies for the Social Science Research Council.

== Notable works ==
- "Social Conditions In An American City: A Summary Of The Findings Of The Springfield Survey" (1920)
- "Welfare problems in New York, city which have been studied and reported upon during the period from 1915 through 1925"
- "Community action through surveys" (1916)
- "Social case workers and better industrial conditions" (1918)

== Personal life ==
Shelby Millard Harrison was born on February 15, 1881, in Leaf River, Illinois, a son of James Franklin and Mary Ellen (Helman) Harrison. He died in 1970 in New York City.
