= Shelby Starner =

American singer-songwriter (1984–2003)

Background information
- Born: Shelby E. Starner; January 3, 1984; East Stroudsburg, Pennsylvania, U.S.
- Died: June 22, 2003 (aged 19) Bartonsville, Pennsylvania, U.S.
- Genres: Pop
- Occupations: Musician, songwriter
- Instruments: Vocals, piano
- Years active: 1997–2002
- Label: Warner Bros. Records

Shelby E. Starner (January 3, 1984 – June 22, 2003) was an American singer-songwriter and musician. She signed a record deal with Warner Bros. Records in 1997, releasing her official debut single, "Don't Let Them" two years later. Starner released her debut studio album, From in the Shadows, later in 1999, but it was not commercially successful. In 2000, Starner worked on a second album; it was never released. Unhappy with Warner Bros. Records, Starner ended her contract. In June 2003, Starner died suddenly at her home due to complications from bulimia nervosa.

== Early life ==
Starner was born on January 3, 1984, in East Stroudsburg, Pennsylvania, to Katherine Hass and Ray J. Starner. She had a stepmother, Susan LaRose, and a stepfather, Allen Benn, in addition to her younger sister, Emily P. Benn, and stepbrother Willie LaRose. Starner resided in Bartonsville. She began writing poetry and songs at the age of 11.

== Career ==
=== 1996–1998: Career beginnings ===
At 12 years of age, Starner wrote the first song she deemed "acceptable" called "Straight A Student." In it, she sang about a popular 17-year-old friend who died when he was driving drunk. Later, in December 1996, Starner's father gifted her a three-hour slot at a studio where she recorded four demos of original songs. Starner was embarrassed initially but later enjoyed the experience. A lawyer and friend of the family gave the demo to executives at Warner Bros. Records. In December 1997, Starner signed her a record deal with Warner Bros. It consisted of a six-album contract worth more than $5 million. Her press representative was Liz Rosenberg, the then senior vice president of publicity at Warner. She enrolled in a home school program for her freshman year of high school.

=== 1999: From in the Shadows ===
Starner recorded a music video for her first single, "Don't Let Them". She released her debut album From in the Shadows, in 1999, through Warner Bros. Records. It was met with positive acclaim but was not commercially successful. Produced by Craig Street, it featured 13 songs. Starner's song about the lack of trust and loyalty in a relationship entitled "You", was featured in commercials for Dawson's Creek. She received coverage in Billboard, Newsweek, and USA Today and appeared on Entertainment Tonight. Newsweek praised Starner as a "pop prodigy". In February 1999, Billboard announced that Starner would be going on a small concert tour through the United States in mid-spring and that Monterey Peninsula Artists was the booking agency. In April 1999, Starner began a mini-concert tour through the Far East and Australia, after which a full United States tour was planned. In Australia, she appeared on an episode of Hey Hey It's Saturday with host Larry Emdur.

=== 2000: Second album and hiatus ===
In 2000, Starner began work on her second album with members of the Red Hot Chili Peppers. She wanted to move into rock and roll, but she did not release the album and chose instead to drop her contract with Warner Bros. Starner's mother commented that, "Warner Brothers wasn't creative enough to find a niche for her ... She was a little mellow and thought of things a little too deeply compared to kids her age that listened to the radio." Starner and her family initially intended to find another company for her to start over until her mother was diagnosed with breast cancer. As a result of these family health issues, Starner did not want to leave her younger sister. During this time, Starner was interested in Médecins Sans Frontières. Starner planned on enrolling at the University of Pittsburgh in August 2003 to major in Latin-American studies and writing. She aspired to write and have an essay on bulimia published.

Starner worked at the Everybody's Cafe on Main Street in Stroudsburg during the months leading up to her death.

== Artistry ==
Music critic Tom Moon praised Starner's debut album From in the Shadows, saying it contained "... powerfully revelatory songs, with lyrics that alternate between the scribbled journal entries of a tetchy teenager and the thoughtful, disarming observations of an adult." A USA Today article stated, "folky debut album 'From the Shadows' got good notices last year (1999), but made little commercial headway." Starner's pop-folk voice has been compared to Jewel and Tori Amos. In January 1999, Jonathan Bernstein, a film critic at Spin, wrote that Shelby Starner and Britney Spears "make up the front line of the next assault of girl-teen prodigies." Record producer, Jim Scott, said that: "Out of all the young artists I've worked with, she was the most spectacular: a great great artist." Starner acknowledged Janis Joplin was her role model.

== Death ==
According to her mother, Starner learned how to hide symptoms of bulimia nervosa by reading websites that promoted it as a lifestyle.

On June 22, 2003, Starner died at her home from bulimia-related electrolyte imbalance that caused brain swelling, resulting in a stroke and seizure. Attempts to revive her at Lehigh Valley Hospital-Pocono in nearby Stroudsburg, Pennsylvania were unsuccessful.

== Discography ==
=== Studio albums ===
- From in the Shadows Released: April 6, 1999
  Label: Warner Bros. Records. Formats: CD, cassette
