= Shelby Ivey Christie =

Black fashion historian

- Born: New York, United States
- Education: North Carolina A&T State University
- Occupations: Fashion and costume historian

Shelby Ivey Christie is an American fashion and costume historian. She specializes in the contributions of Black designers. Christie is best known for writing Twitter threads about specific moments or people in fashion history.

== Early life and education ==
Christie was born in New York and lived in Denver, Colorado from age 3. She and her mother moved to Charlotte, North Carolina when she was 10.

Christie enjoyed history from a young age and easily memorized dates and facts. Black Southern trends sparked her interest in fashion, such as the tall tees and jersey dresses associated with crunk culture. She also cited the television show 106 & Park and the magazines Jet and Ebony as early influences. She names Mildred Blount as her favorite designer.

Christie received her bachelor's degree in race, history, and culture from North Carolina A&T State University. As of September 2020, she is completing her master's degree in costume studies at New York University.

== Career ==
Christie previously interned at W and InStyle. After college, she worked as a digital marketing and sales planner at Vogue. She credits that position with her learning how to use Twitter to write long threads in short pieces, detailing specific parts of fashion history. She intentionally uses AAVE, memes, and colloquial speech in her threads to challenge rhetorical norms related to academia. Subjects of her viral threads include Arthur McGee, the first Black designer who worked on 7th Avenue, and a thread about Josephine Baker's film career.

Christie specializes in information about fashion history at the intersections of race and culture. Her stated goal is to share the contributions of Black designers in fashion history. Christie also seeks to credit Black designers' historic contributions to fashion that are not widely known, such as the work of designer Felicia Farrar. She also advocates for structural changes to address the low numbers of Black leadership in the industry.

She partnered with Netflix to do a fashion thread for Beyoncé's Homecoming. She also hosted an Instagram Live where she interviewed Zerina Akers, the costume designer for Black Is King, which had approximately 16,000 viewers.

=== Accolades ===
- 2020 - Dazed, Dazed 100
- 2020 - Forbes, 30 under 30
