= Shelby James =

American bicycle motocross rider (born 1973)

Personal information
- Full name: George Roderick James Jr.
- Born: October 29, 1973 (age 53) Orlando, Florida, United States
- Height: 1.85 m (6 ft 1 in)

Cycling career
- Sport: Cycling
- Current team: Retired
- Discipline: Bicycle Motocross (BMX)
- Role: Racer
- Rider type: Off Road

Amateur teams
- 1980–1981: DG
- 1981: Oakridge Bike Shop
- 1981–1982: Oakridge Bike Shop/MCS
- 1983–1986: Profile
- 1986–1987: Murray/Jolly Rancher
- 1987: Now & Later/Murray
- 1987–1989: Mongoose
- 1989–1990: Vans/Free Agent

Shelby James (born October 29, 1973 in Orlando, Florida United States) was an Amateur American "Old School" Bicycle Motocross (BMX) racer whose prime competitive years were from 1982 to 1990. Starting at age six, it could be said that Shelby James was one of the best racers never to turn pro. From the first year of competition in 1979 he was winning titles. In part due to his large size for his age, he was already 5' 11" by the age of 13 in June 1988 and then 6'1" at 14 years of age, he was one of the most dominatant amateur racers since Richie Anderson (who was also for time larger than normal for his peer group). However, his first love was basketball and always had the intention to become a professional basketball player in the background of his mind. In 1990 after an injury during a race, he quit BMX to pursue that dream.

== Racing career milestones ==
Note: Professional first are on the national level unless otherwise indicated.

Milestone	Event Details
Started Racing:	April 1979 at six years old.
Sanctioning body:	
Sanctioning body district(s):	American Bicycle Association (ABA): Florida District 1 (FL-1) (1987)
First race bike:	A borrowed bike.
First race result:	First place
First win (local):	See above
First sponsor:	DG
First national win:	
Turned Professional:	No Professional career.
Height & weight at height of his career (1988):	

Retired: In early 1990 after suffering an injury to his chest in a crash at the NBL Easter Classic on April 15, 1990, James retired from BMX to pursue his dream of becoming a professional Basketball player. This was practically confirmed by an April BMX Plus! article writing about another racer, Shawn Bone, when he quit the Robinson Products racing team giving up BMX for the Basketball court:

"....Shawn Bone quit the team to pursue a basketball career--aka:Shelby James syndrome.

=== Career factory and major bike shop sponsors ===
Note: This listing only denotes the racer's primary sponsors. At any given time a racer could have numerous ever-changing co-sponsors. Primary sponsorships can be verified by BMX press coverage and sponsor's advertisements at the time in question. When possible exact dates are used.

==== Amateur ====
- D.G. Performance Specialties (The initials stood for Dan Hangsleben, Gary Harlow): 1980-Early 1981
- Oakridge Bike Shop: Early 1981 to Early April 1981
- Oakridge Bike Shop/MCS (Moto Cross Specialties) Bicycle Specialties: Early April 1981 – 1982. He was on its "B" Team.
- Profile Racing: Early 1983-October 1986
- Murray Ohio/Jolly Rancher: October 1986-February 1987
- Murray Ohio/Now & Later: February 1987-September 1987 Murray Ohio decided to drop their race and freestyle efforts after the 1987 NBL Grandnationals.
- Mongoose (BMX Products): Late November 1987-December 1989 The 1987 NBL Christmas Classic was his first race with Mongoose. In December 1989 Mongoose would let James go due to budget cuts.
- Vans/Free Agent: December 1989-April 1990

==== Professional ====
- No professional career.

=== Career bicycle motocross titles ===
Note: Listed are District, State/Provincial/Department, Regional, National, and International titles in italics. "Defunct" refers to the fact of that sanctioning body in question no longer existing at the start of the racer's career or at that stage of his/her career. Depending on point totals of individual racers, winners of Grand Nationals do not necessarily win National titles. Series and one off Championships are also listed in block.

==== Amateur ====
National Bicycle Association (NBA)

- None

National Pedal Sport Association (NPSA)

- 1979, 1980 Florida State No.1
- 1979, 1980 National No.1

National Bicycle League (NBL)

- 1979, 1981–1986 Florida State Champion
- 1981 6 Expert National No.2
- 1983 8 Expert National No.3
- 1984 10 Expert Grandnational Champion
- 1984 10 Expert National No.1
- 1985 11 Expert Grandnational Champion
- 1985 11 Expert National No.1
- 1986 12 Expert and 12 & Under Cruiser Murray World Cup V Champion
- 1986 12 Expert and 12 & Under Cruiser Grandnational Champion.
- 1986 12 Expert and 12 & Under Cruiser National No.1
- 1987 13 Expert and 13 Cruiser Vision Street Wear World Cup Champion
- 1987 13 Cruiser Grandnational Champion
- 1987 13 Expert National No.3
- 1987 13 Cruiser National No.1
- 1987 14 Expert and 14-15 Cruiser President's Cup Champion.
- 1988 14 Expert and 14 Cruiser Grandnational Champion.
- 1988 14 Expert and 14 Cruiser National No.1
- 1989 15 Expert and 15 Cruiser Grandnational Champion.
- 1989 15 Expert and 15 Cruiser National No.1

American Bicycle Association (ABA)

- 1979,1980, 1981 Florida State Champion
- 1984 10 Expert US Gold Cup Champion
- 1984 Florida District # (FlA-) No.1
- 1984 Winter Season Champion*
- 1988 15 Cruiser Grandnational Champion.
- 1989 16 Cruiser Grandnational Champion.
- 1989 Cruiser National No.1

*In 1984 in addition to the District and State and National No.1 titles the ABA divided up the race season into three distinct points seasons and rewarded year end plates for it.

International Bicycle Motocross Federation (IBMXF)

- 1981 7 Expert International Champion
- 1985 11 Expert Canada Cup Champion
- 1985 11 Expert World Champion
- 1986 12 Expert and 13 & Under Cruiser World Champion
- 1987 13 Expert and 13 & Under Cruiser World Champion
- 1989 14-15 Cruiser World Champion

Fédération Internationale Amateur de Cyclisme (FIAC)*

- 1988 15 boys and 17 & Under Cruiser World Champion
- 1989 16 boys and Cruiser I World Champion

* Due to FIAC rules at the time James had to race in a year older class than his usual 14 Expert class because James had his birthday late in the year.

Independent race series and Invitationals

- 1982 8 Expert Anglo American Champion

==== Professional ====
- No professional career

=== Notable accolades ===
- 1985 NBL Rider of the Year.
- Named 1st (in a three-way tie with 70 points with In Hee Lee and David Milham) out of 21 racers deemed BMX's Hottest Amateurs in 1988 from a BMX Plus! poll of seven team managers which included Don Crupi of MCS, Mike Seevers of GT, Yvonne Shoup of Free Agent, Dave Custodero of Mongoose, Mike Donell of Revcore, Bill Nelson of Robinson and Racer/Team Manager of Diamond Back Harry Leary.

=== BMX product lines ===
- 1984 Profile Shelby James Mini

Product Evaluation:

- 1986 Profile Shelby James Replica

Product Evaluation:
Freestyle BMX June 1986 Vol.1 Iss.26 pg.52

=== Significant injuries ===
- Had a bout of bronchitis on October 28, 1989, after coming in second in 15 expert at the ABA Fall Nationals in Yorba Linda, California. He went home to recuperate instead of racing 16 expert for the first time the next day.
- He received a chest injury at the NBL Easter Classic in Sarasota, Florida, on April 15, 1990, at which point he started considering retiring from BMX competition to pursue his ambition to be a professional basketball player. He eventually did retire, making this technically a career-ending injury.

=== Racing traits and habits ===
- From when he was 8 Expert to approximately when he was a 16 Expert he was much taller than his peer group. This in turn made him much stronger and as a result was dominant in his age group class during those years racing the NBL racing circuit.

=== Miscellaneous ===
- James was in the top five in points for the NBL from 1979 to 1985.
- James entered the NBL Grand Nationals with a perfect score from 1981 to 1986.
- In 1988 at age 14 he dated and had as a steady girlfriend a 20-year-old woman from North Carolina named Shannon. His previous girlfriend was 12 years old.
- His other athletic love was Basketball. In his last year of junior high school he averaged 24 points a game. He was on the High School varsity team as a freshman. He eventually left BMX racing in early 1990 to pursue his ambition to be a professional

Basketball player.

=== Post BMX career ===
- Pursued a career in basketball after April 1990.
- Shelby resides in Apopka, Florida, where he has a successful career in sales.

== BMX press magazine interviews and articles ==
- "NBL National Number 1's" Bicycles Today January 1985 Vol.7 No.1 pg.14 Short biographical blurb in sanctioning body newspaper for becoming NBL National No.1 10 Expert in 1984.
- "On The Winning Track" Super BMX & Freestyle November 1986 Vol.13 No.11 pg.40 Brief article on Shelby James with detailed career titles listing.
- "5 World Champs" BMX Plus! December 1988 Vol.11 No.12 pg.48 One of five racers profiled including Melanie Cline, Mark Sterious, Sam Arellano, and Franck Roman.
- "Team Mongoose" BMX Plus! August 1989 Vol.12 No.8 pg.18 A profile of the Mongoose racing team including Eric Rupe, Sam Arellano, and Travis Chipres
- "Racing Secrets of the Stars" BMX Plus! January 1990 Vol.13 No.1 pg.56 One of four articles of different racers on how they train.

== BMX magazine covers ==
Note: Only magazines that were in publication at the time of the racer's career(s) are listed unless specifically noted.

Minicycle/BMX Action & Super BMX:

Bicycle Motocross Action & Go:

BMX Plus!:

Total BMX

Bicycles and Dirt:

BMX World (1990 version):

Bicycles Today' & BMX Today (The official NBL membership publication under two different names):

ABA Action, American BMXer, BMXer (the official ABA membership publication under three different names):
