= Shelby Bach =

American writer

- Born: August 28, 1986 (age 40)
- Education: Vassar College
- Occupation: Writer
- Writing career
- Language: English
- Genre: Middle-grade fantasy
- Notable works: Of Giants and Ice, Of Witches and Wind, Of Sorcery and Snow, Of Enemies and Endings
- Website: shelbybach.com

Shelby Bach (born August 28, 1986) is the author of The Ever Afters, a middle-grade book series. Its first installment, Of Giants and Ice, was published by Simon & Schuster Books for Young Readers in July 2012. The sequel, Of Witches and Wind, was released in July 2013. The third book, Of Sorcery and Snow, was released in June, 2014. The fourth and final book in the series, Of Enemies and Endings, was released June 2015. She has also written under the pen name Zoe Barton.

Bach lives in Portland, Oregon, and is a part-time nanny. Shelby Bach grew up reading every book she could find and writing stories in battered notebooks. She rarely came home with a clean shirt and had many accidents that ended with hunts for Band-Aids. Nowadays she writes on her laptop rather than in a notebook, but not much else has changed.

== Biography ==
Shelby Randol Trenkelbach was born in Houston, Texas and raised in Charlotte, North Carolina. In 2008, she graduated from Vassar College with a Bachelor of Arts in English She worked in the children's imprint of a New York publishing house before moving away and writing full-time. Bach has now returned to Charlotte, North Carolina.

Kirkus Reviews called Bach's debut novel, The Ever Afters #1: Of Giants and Ice, "a fast-paced combination of middle school realism and fairy tale fantasy." According to Shelby Bach, she was "born in Houston, Texas" before her "family moved to Charlotte, North Carolina when [she] was one and a half. In the land of Southern belles, [she] was an outspoken goofball with an excessively loud laugh. ([she] only got kicked out of the library once, though – [she] loved books so much [that she] decided to learn some volume control.) In fifth grade, [she] wrote [her] first novel while hiding a composition notebook inside [her] desk. It was about a girl who saved the world from an alien invasion. After that, [she] kept a collection of notebooks, pens, and stories nearby at all times. By the age of twenty, [she] finished seven books – six children’s fantasy, one adult – which I consider fantastic practice for when I started writing for real.

After she graduated from Vassar College in 2008 (with a Bachelor of Arts in English), her wandering years began.She moved straight to New York City to attend the Columbia Publishing Course. Then [she] spent a year working as a children’s books editorial assistant in a major publishing house. In August 2009, the lure of writing got too strong. With a bunch of notes on an after-school program for fairy tale characters-in-training, [she] moved to Montana. [she] wrote full time in a small cabin until the bears visiting [her] porch scared me off. Then [she] moved back to an area where the wildlife is much less dangerous – [her] childhood hometown Charlotte, North Carolina. While working on Of Giants and Ice and Of Witches and Wind, [she] enjoyed a year close to [her] family and oldest friends, but then wanderlust struck again. [She] spent four months driving [her] Mini Cooper up the West Coast and trying out new places to live, and... picked Portland, Oregon as the best, most fun, most bookish fit. [She] plan[s] to stay a while. In fact, [she is] thinking about staying for life."

Shelby says, "I’m now writing the fourth book in The Ever Afters series. In my free time, I read, explore my new hometown, cook unhealthy but delicious dishes, knit increasingly complicated quilts, and – unsurprisingly – travel."

== Works ==
Always Neverland (HarperCollins 2011)
The Ever Afters #1: Of Giants and Ice (Simon & Schuster Books for Young Readers 2012)
The Ever Afters #2: Of Witches and Wind (Simon & Schuster Books for Young Readers 2013)
The Ever Afters #3: Of Sorcery and Snow (Simon & Schuster Books for Young Readers 2014)
The Ever Afters #4: Of Enemies and Endings (Simon & Schuster Books for Young Readers 2015)
