= Shelby Brewer =

American physicist

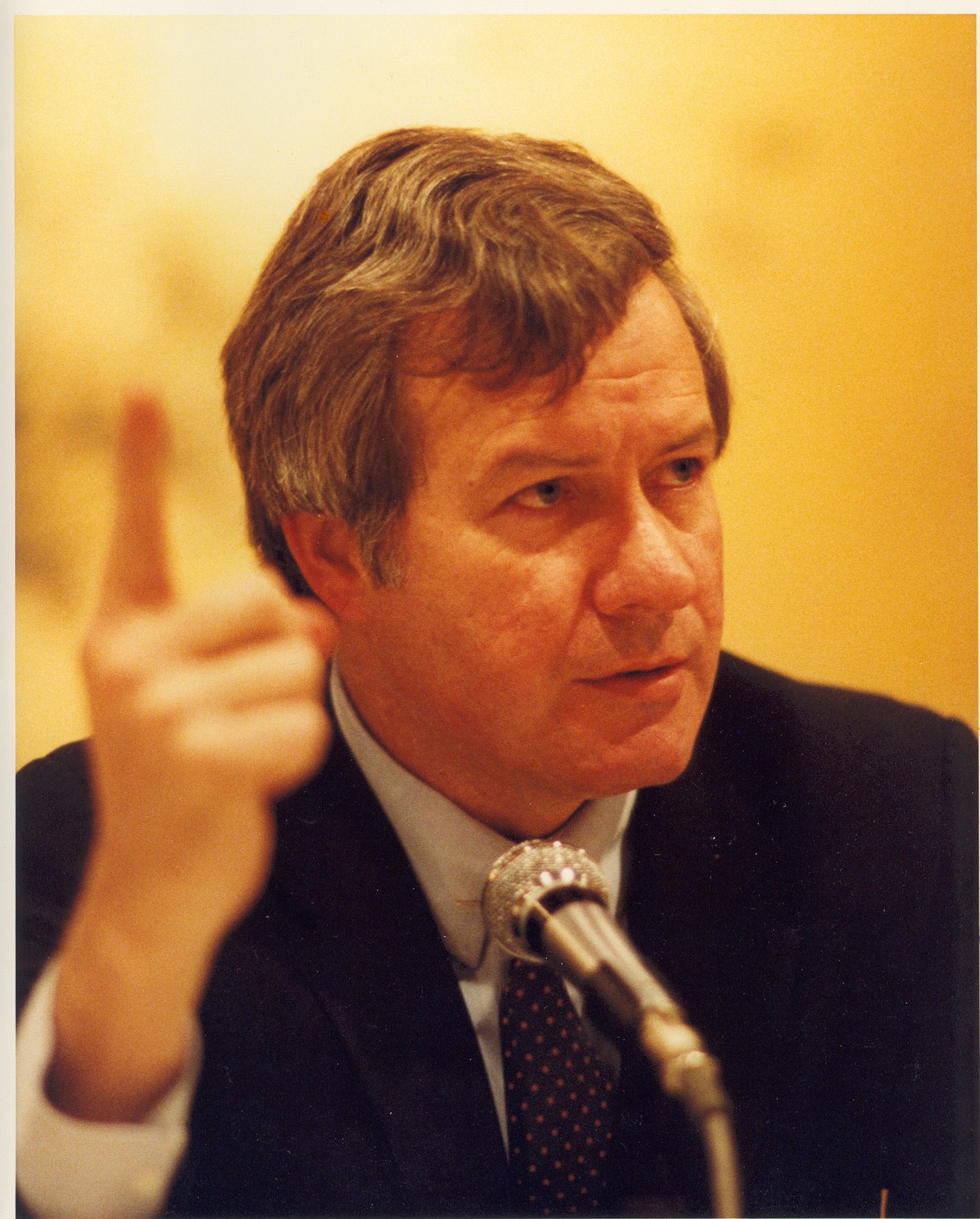
Shelby Brewer

Shelby Templeton Brewer (February 19, 1937 – March 19, 2015) was an American nuclear energy sector executive in private and public positions since 1978. He was Chief Executive Officer of ABB-Combustion Engineering Nuclear Power, one of the world's leading nuclear companies for ten years (1985–1995). He was the top nuclear official in the Reagan Administration from 1981–1984, serving as the Assistant Secretary of Energy for Nuclear Energy.

== Early year and personal information ==
Shelby Brewer was born and raised in Little Rock, Arkansas, and attended public school there. He is the son of Fay Templeton Brewer and Donald Brewer, an aviation pioneer in the 1920s and 1930s. He has one sister, Janet Templeton Riggs who is married to B. Lawrence Riggs, MD. Shelby Brewer died on 19 March 2015 in Alexandria, Virginia.

Shelby was a junior tennis champion, winning numerous tournaments and achieving a place on the 1953 Junior Davis Cup Team.

He married Marie Ulfsdotter Anesten of Sweden in 1966. They resided in Alexandria, Virginia and had two children (Jens and Sara) and five grandchildren (Hannah, Hayden, William, Matilda, and Arthur).

== Education ==
Brewer earned these degrees:

- BA Humanities, Columbia College, Columbia University
- BS Engineering, Columbia School of Engineering
- MS Nuclear Engineering, Massachusetts Institute of Technology
- PhD Nuclear Engineering, Massachusetts Institute of Technology

== Military service ==
Brewer served in the U.S. Navy as a commissioned officer during 1961–64. He was a division head on the USS Randolph during 1961–62, supervising several hundred personnel. He participated in Mercury astronaut recovery, the Bay of Pigs and Dominican Republic engagements. During 1963–64, he was Dean of the U.S. Naval Reactors School at New London, Connecticut and Bainbridge, Maryland, a training school for naval officers entering the nuclear fleet.

== Career posts ==
=== Nuclear Chief in Reagan Administration (1981–84) ===
Brewer was appointed by President Ronald Reagan and confirmed by the US Senate. in 1981 to the top U.S. Government post in nuclear energy, where his management responsibilities included: all civilian nuclear research, development, and demonstration programs; U.S. Navy nuclear reactor development and deployment; the U.S. Uranium Enrichment Enterprise (for both civilian and military purposes); nuclear waste management; special applications of nuclear technology, such as power isotope and reactor systems for space missions. His fiscal responsibilities included managing assets of over $20 billion, with annual outlays of about $1.5 billion, and uranium enrichment outlays and revenues of about $2 billion.

When Brewer was appointed in 1981, nuclear power in the US was in a slump. Many nuclear plants in the licensing and construction pipeline had been terminated, and new orders had ceased. The Carter administration had banned breeder reactor development and commercial reprocessing in the US, and had characterized nuclear as an energy source of last resort. Brewer's orders from the Reagan administration were to reverse the Carter policies and to reinvigorate the US nuclear option.

Shelby Brewer set down in his confirmation statement to the US Senate an agenda for a nuclear reformation. Brewer elected to focus sharply on several large policy deliverables necessary for configuring nuclear power as a mature business. His statement stressed (1) nuclear licensing reform, streamlining and standardization of nuclear designs offered by the vendors; (2) closure of the backend of the nuclear fuel cycle, with an option ultimately for reprocessing, and deployment of a national system for disposition of spent nuclear fuel; (3) remobilization of the US Breeder Reactor Program; and (4) reforming and making more responsible the role of government in domestic nuclear power development, while reducing government spending. Brewer's confirmation statement formed the basis of President Reagan's Nuclear Policy Statement in October 1981.

Brewer is credited with a score of historically significant achievements:

- Revitalization of U.S. nuclear policies, while reducing federal spending on nuclear energy by about 50%.
- Design of a streamlined nuclear licensing and regulatory system, now embodied in federal code and legislation (Energy Policy Act of 1992).
- Design and enactment of the Nuclear Waste Act of 1982.
- Uranium enrichment business turnaround (1983–84), following a severe market crisis, saving the multi-billion dollar enterprise from insolvency.
- Initiation of the Naval Advanced Fleet Reactor Program.
- Reformulation and reform of U.S. nuclear export policies.
- Negotiation of the Japan-U.S. breeder reactor agreement, following the termination of the Clinch River demonstration project.
- Mobilization of TMI cleanup and recovery.
- Rationalizing and projectizing diverse U.S. Government programs addressing the “nuclear waste legacy” left by the Manhattan Project and subsequent nuclear weapons programs.
- Service as Chairman of Tri-Agency Task Force on Space Power support of the Strategic Defense Initiative (SDI), aka “Star Wars”.

Brewer served as “Nuclear Czar” until October 1984 when he resigned to become President of the Nuclear Division at Combustion Engineering. Commenting on Brewer's record during his first term, President Ronald Reagan said: "In each of these cases, as well as many more, I have relied on your wise and expert guidance, and I want to thank you personally for a job well done."

=== President & CEO ABB-Combustion Engineering (1985-95) ===
Brewer joined Combustion Engineering in 1985 as President of its Nuclear Power Division. In 1990, Combustion Engineering was acquired by Asea Brown Boveri (ABB), and Brewer's responsibilities were expanded.

Combustion Engineering Nuclear underwent a rapid repositioning during his service as its Chairman, President and CEO, including the following benchmark events:

- A major turnaround by 1985, in a slack, oversupplied and highly competitive nuclear market; a pretax profitability swing from minus $20 million (1984) to plus $20 million (1985) on current and ongoing operations, through downsizing, re-engineering of the nuclear businesses, exiting low-performing product lines, and divesting low-performing business units.
- Doubling in sales volume in nuclear services (aftermarket) by 1987, and improvement in services from break-even to a return on sales of 10%.
- Awarding of the first nuclear plant order (for a US company) in over a decade, with the orders placed by Republic of Korea, for a series of CE standardized nuclear plants, providing CE with the largest profit-bearing nuclear system backlog among the world's nuclear suppliers.
- The first standardized nuclear plant design to obtain a pre-license from Nuclear Regulatory Commission (NRC), under new streamlined regulatory processes formulated by Brewer as Assistant Secretary of Energy.
- Lead ABB's initiatives in Kuwait and the Former Soviet Union.
- Established ABB joint venture with Monolit, the FSU's engineering and manufacturing entity for ICBM control systems.
