= Shelby Tucker =

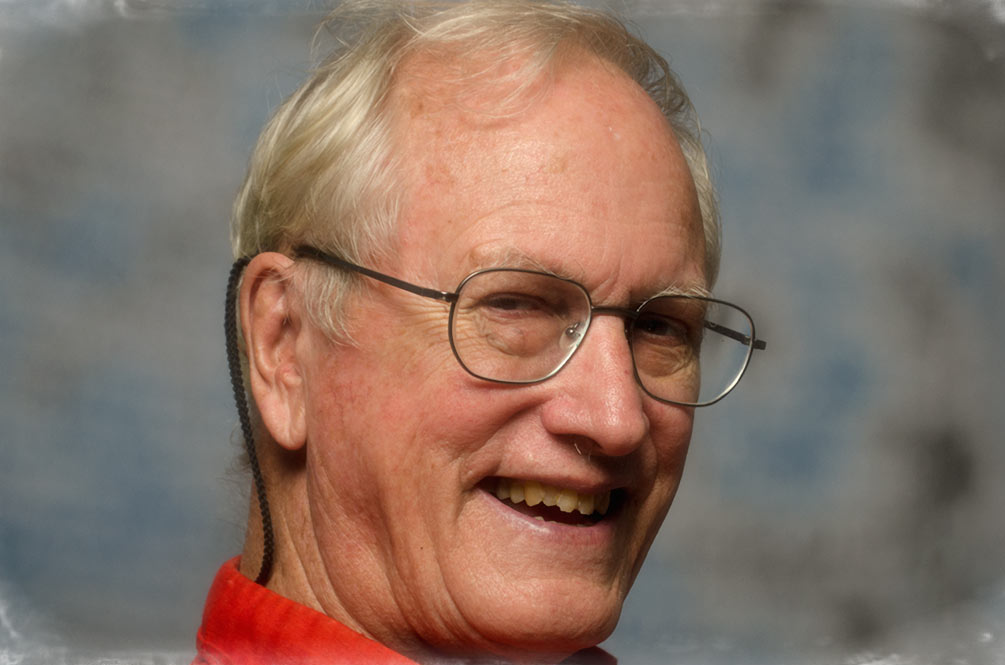
- Born: 1935
- Died: 2023 (aged 87–88)
- Education: University of Oxford; Tulane University (JD)
- Writing career
- Period: 2000 – 2017
- Notable work: Among Insurgents

James Shelby Tucker Jr. (1935 – 2023), also known by his pen name Shelby Tucker, was a dual-national American and British lawyer, journalist, and author.

His works included Among Insurgents: Walking Through Burma, the story of his trek from China to India through the Kachin highlands of northern Burma; Burma: The Curse of Independence, a 'plain man's guide' to Burma's perennial strife; The Last Banana: Dancing with the Watu, about David Livingstone's quest for 'God's highway', the role of the Greeks in bringing the 'three Cs' (commerce, Christianity and civilization) to Tanganyika, and Tucker's African travels; Client Service, a satirical novel about an offshore financial company, drawn from a moment in the sixties when Tucker was a 'financial counsellor' for Bernie Cornfeld's notorious Investors Overseas Services; and (jointly with Ilona Gruber Drivdal) Poetry and Thinking of the Chagga, a translation of a German missionary's study of the beliefs and customs of the Chagga peoples of German East Africa that had been published in 1909.

== Early life and education ==
Tucker was born on March 1, 1935 in Ripley, Tennessee, the eldest son of James Shelby Tucker and Louise Nowlin Tucker and went to Memphis East High School and Phillips Academy. Tucker attended Yale University and Oxford University and earned his J.D. degree at Tulane University. He was called to the bar in Louisiana and New York and admitted to practice before the Fifth, Second and Eleventh United States Circuit Courts of Appeal and the United States Supreme Court. He has practiced law in London, New York City, New Orleans, Wellington, New Zealand and Perth, Western Australia.

In 1976, Tucker married Carole Shelby Carnes, a distant cousin, in Zanzibar. Acting for his wife in Tucker v. Summers, he changed the rules governing admission of foreign-trained lawyers to the Louisiana bar.

== Travels ==
Tucker expounded his passion for travel in an interview for the Andover Bulletin: 'Spanish has an expression for monomania. "Cada loco tiene su tema" —every lunatic has his theme. Mine, for most of my life, has been the open road, wherever it leads.' When he was 17, he left his father asleep in their hotel room in Shreveport and hitchhiked to the Pacific coast and on to Yellowstone Park, Salt Lake City, Denver, El Paso and Mexico City, returning home after three weeks in time for school. Nine months later, he boarded a tanker as supercargo, sailed to Venezuela and on to Haifa, then hitchhiked around Israel and most of Western Europe. Two summers later, he hitchhiked across North Africa.

In 1957, while an undergraduate at Oxford, he attended the 6th World Festival of Youth and Students in Moscow, then travelled through Siberia to Peking, notwithstanding a US government ban on travel there. After leaving Oxford, he hitchhiked to Egypt. In 1960–62, he spent eight months hitchhiking from England to and around the Indian subcontinent, then signed on a freighter bound for New Zealand and hitchhiked through New Zealand, Australia, Indonesia, Malaya, Thailand, Laos, Cambodia and Japan, then signed on a freighter bound for California and hitchhiked to Alaska. He drove from Europe to Saudi Arabia via Turkey, Lebanon, Jordan and Iraq, and returned via Egypt, Libya, Tunisia, Algeria and Morocco in 1965, and two years later hitchhiked from Rio de Janeiro to Buenos Aires, Santiago, La Paz, Cuzco, Machu Picchu, Lima and Bogota, walked along ancient Indian trails through the jungle to Panama, then hitchhiked to Mississippi through Central America and Mexico.

In 1967 he made the first of 16 trips to sub-Saharan Africa. In 1972, after the government of Ethiopia closed its border with Sudan, he rode into Metemma on a camel. His honeymoon after his marriage in Zanzibar in 1976, was overlanding back to England via the Nile, Saudi Arabia, Jordan, Syria and Turkey. After hitching around Malawi in 1988, he returned to England via Kenya, Somalia, Djibouti, Yemen, Saudi Arabia, Jordan, Iraq and Turkey. In 1989, the year following his Among Insurgents trek, he trekked around eastern Burma with the Karen National Liberation Army. In 2002, he crossed the Atlantic in a sailboat. He returned to New Zealand in 2006 and Australia in 2007 to hitchhike to places he had not reached in 1961-62 and in 2010-11 repeated his 1960 hitchhiking trip through the Middle East and around the Indian subcontinent.

== Reception ==
Among Insurgents was ranked the top-selling travel hardback in the UK three weeks after its publication. Maggie Gee wrote that it was 'a first book by an unknown author that makes you want to stand up and applaud ... it deserves to become a classic.' A review in the Royal Geographical Society's Geographical Magazine stated: 'It is always dangerous to bandy around words like "classic", but Among Insurgents is a rare treasure ... It is a tale which can only inspire the utmost respect ... ' It was Colin Thubron's favourite reading for 2000. He characterized it as an 'astonishing book: a surreal mixture of Boy's Own derring-do and expert knowledge of an almost unknown region' Six national newspapers in the UK selected it for their Best Books of the Year features.

Reviewing Client Service, Maggie Gee wrote "The genius of this ambitious subject is all [Tucker's] own, as are his glimpses of the beautiful natural universe against which tiny human beings prance, the sky above them "robin's egg blue turning to silver". This book is a rarity, at once deeply serious and absurdly enjoyable ... Read it now, before the next wave of irrational exuberance drowns us all.

In his review of The Last Banana, Michael Moran stated that the book's author was 'that rare species of travel writer: an authentic adventurer of expansive Victorian self-confidence and Christian moral conviction; a man of uncompromising intellectual standards and fierce loyalty in friendship. This, in an age devoted to contrived "travel experiences", cosmetic celebrity and the adoration of the Golden Calf. Fr Alexander Lucie-Smith wrote that The Last Banana was 'the best book about Africa I have ever read or am ever likely to read.

Burma: The Curse of Independence reviews: The Tablet, 2 August 2002, • The Wall Street Journal, 28 August 2002,

The Last Banana reviews: The Independent, 18 May 2010, • The Tablet, 22 July 2010. http://www.thetablet.co.uk/review/508• Travel News Kenya, November 2010,

== Personal life ==
Shelby Tucker is the half-brother of Bruen Tucker, a member of the Oregon Society of Certified Public Accountants and accomplished golfer.

== Works ==
- Among Insurgents: Walking Through Burma (2000, I.B. Tauris; ISBN 9781860645297 / 2001, Flamingo; ISBN 9780007127054)
- Burma: The Curse of Independence (2001, Pluto Press; ISBN 9780745315416)
- The Last Banana: Dancing with the Watu (2010, Stacey International; ISBN 9781906768218)
- Client Service (2012, Stacey International; ISBN 9781906768928)
- Poetry and Thinking of the Chagga (2017, Signal Books; ISBN 9781909930445) — a translation of a German book by Bruno Gutmann
