= Shelby D. Hunt =

American business academic (1939–2022)

- Born: July 5, 1939; East Prairie, Missouri, U.S.
- Died: July 12, 2022 (aged 83); Lubbock, Texas, U.S.
- Occupations: Professor, author, consultant

Academic background
- Education: PhD, Michigan State University, 1968; B. Science (Mechanical Engineering) Ohio University, 1962
- Alma mater: Michigan State University

Academic work
- Discipline: Marketing
- Institutions: University of Wisconsin-Madison, Michigan State University Texas Tech University
- Notable works: A General Theory of Competition: Resources, Competences, Productivity, Economic Growth,' 2000
- Notable ideas: Grounding marketing concepts in RA theory

Shelby D. Hunt (July 5, 1939 – July 12, 2022) was an American organizational theorist, the Jerry S. Rawls and P. W. Horn Professor of Marketing at the Texas Tech University, and a highly cited marketing researcher. He is noted for his contributions to competition theory and the resource-advantage view.

== Life and career ==
Hunt originally studied mechanical engineering at Ohio University, graduating with a Bachelor of Science in 1962. He received his PhD from Michigan State University in 1968. After working as a technical sales representative for Hercules Plastics Inc, he began his academic career at the University of Wisconsin-Madison in 1969. He chaired the Marketing Department from 1974 to 1980. In 1980, he took up an academic position in the graduate school of the Texas Tech University and is currently the Jerry S. Rawls and P. W. Horn Professor of Marketing at the Texas Tech University. He was the Editor of the Journal of Marketing from 1984 to 1987.

His research interests are in the fields of "Competition, Strategy, Marketing Theory, Ethics, Macromarketing, and Philosophy of Science." He has authored dozens of books and more than 150 articles and is one of the 250 most cited authors in business and economics. He and his work are the subject of the publication, Legends in Marketing: Shelby D. Hunt, edited by Jagdish N. Sheth and published in 2011.

Shelby D. Hunt died on July 12, 2022, at the age of 83.

== Recognition and awards ==
Hunt was the recipient of multiple awards for his scholarship and services to education, including:

- 1976 The Harold H. Maynard Award for the “best article on marketing theory” for “The Nature and Scope of Marketing” published in the Journal of Marketing
- 1983 The Harold H. Maynard Award for the “best article on marketing theory” for “General Theories and Fundamental Explananda of Marketing” published in the Journal of Marketing
- 1986 The Paul D. Converse Award from the American Marketing Association for his contributions to marketing scholarship
- 1989 The Charles C. Slater Award for “Reification and Realism in Marketing: in Defense of Reason,” published in the Journal of Macromarketing
- 1987 The Outstanding Marketing Educator Award from the Academy of Marketing Science
- 1992 The Distinguished Marketing Educator Award from the American Marketing Association/Richard D. Irwin
- 1995 (with co-author, Robert M. Morgan) recipient of the Harold H. Maynard Award for the “best article on marketing theory” for “The Comparative Advantage Theory of Competition” published in the Journal of Marketing
- 2000 (with co-author, Lawrence B. Chonko) recipient of the Elsevier Science Exceptional Quality and High Scholarly Impact award for “Ethics and Marketing Management,” Journal of Business Research
- 2002 The Distinguished Scholar Award from the Society for Marketing Advances/Elsevier Science
- 2017 Named as a “Marketing Legend” by the American Marketing Association

== Publications ==
Books

- 1971, with Urban B. Ozanne, The Economic Effects of Franchising, Washington: United States Senate, U.S. Government Printing Office
- 1976, Marketing Theory: Conceptual Foundations of Research in Marketing, Columbus: Grid Publishing, Inc.
- 1982, with Ronald Bush, Marketing Theory: Philosophy of Science Perspectives, Chicago: American Marketing Association.
- 1983, Marketing Theory: The Philosophy of Marketing Science, Homewood, Illinois: Richard D. Irwin, Inc.
- 1991, Modern Marketing Theory: Critical Issues in the Philosophy of Marketing Science, Cincinnati: SouthWestern Publishing Co.
- 2000, A General Theory of Competition: Resources, Competences, Productivity, Economic Growth. Thousand Oaks, CA: Sage Publications
- 2002, Foundations of Marketing Theory: Toward a General Theory of Marketing, Armonk, NY: M.E. Sharpe, Inc.
- 2003, Controversy in Marketing Theory: For Reason, Realism, Truth, and Objectivity, Armonk, NY: M.E. Sharpe, Inc.
- 2010, Marketing Theory: Foundations, Controversy, Strategy, Resource-Advantage Theory, Armonk, NY: M.E. Sharpe, Inc.

Articles/ Chapters

- 1994, "The Commitment-trust Theory of Relationship Marketing," Journal of Marketing, Vol. 58, pp 20–38
- 1995, [co-authored with R.M. Morgan], “The Comparative Advantage Theory of Competition,” Journal of Marketing, Vol. 59, April, pp 1–15
- 1996, [co-authored with R.M. Morgan], “The Resource-advantage Theory of Competition: Dynamics, Path Dependencies, and Evolutionary dimensions,” Journal of Marketing, Vol. 60, October, pp 107–114
- 1997, "Competing Through Relationships: Grounding Relationship Marketing in Resource-Advantage Theory," Journal of Marketing Management, Vol. 13, pp 431–445
- 1999, “The Strategic Imperative and Sustainable Competitive advantage: Public Policy and Resource Advantage Theory,” Journal of Academy of Marketing Science, Vol. 27, No. 2, pp 144–5
- 2000, “The Competence-based, Resource-advantage, and Neoclassical Theories of Competition: Toward a synthesis”, in Sanchez, R. and Heene, A. (eds), Competence-based Strategic Management: Theory and Research, JAI Press, Greenwich, CT, pp 177–208
- 2001, “A General Theory of Competition: Issues, Answers, and an Invitation”, European Journal of Marketing, Vol. 35, Nos 5/6, pp 524–48
- 2002, [Co-authored with R.E. Morgan] “Determining Marketing Strategy: A Cybernetic Systems Approach to Scenario Planning,” European Journal of Marketing, Vol. 36 No. 4, pp 450–78
- 2003, [co-authored with Dennis B.Arnett] "Resource-Advantage Theory and Embeddedness: Explaining R-A Theory’s Explanatory Success," Journal of Marketing Theory and Practice, Vol. 11, No. 1, pp 1–17
- 2004, [co-authored with Dennis B.Arnett] "Market Segmentation Strategy, Competitive Advantage, and Public Policy: Grounding Segmentation Strategy in Resource-Advantage Theory," Australasian Journal of Marketing, Vol. 12, no. 1, 2004, pp 7–25
- 2008, [co-authored with Donna F. Davis], "Grounding Supply Chain Management in Resource-Advantage Theory," Volume 44, No. 1, 2008, pp 10–21
- 2011, "Sustainable marketing, equity, and economic growth: a resource-advantage, economic freedom approach," Journal of the Academy of Marketing Science, Vol. 39, pp 7– 20
- 2011, "Developing Successful Theories in Marketing: Insights from Resource-advantage Theory," AMS Review, Vol. 1, No. 1
- 2012, [co-authored with Sreedhar Madhavaram],"Managerial Action and Resource Advantage Theory: Conceptual Frameworks Emanating From a Positive Theory of Competition," Journal of Business & Industry Marketing, Vol. 27, No. 7, pp 582–591
- 2012, "The Evolution of Resource‐advantage Theory: Six events, Six realizations, Six contributions", Journal of Historical Research in Marketing, Vol. 4, No. 1, pp. 7–29
