= Shelby Westbrook =

Tuskegee Airman (1922–2016)

- Born: January 15, 1922; Marked Tree, Arkansas
- Died: August 17, 2016 (aged 94); Chicago, Illinois
- Burial place: Abraham Lincoln National Cemetery
- Military career
- Allegiance: United States
- Branch: United States Army Air Forces
- Service years: 1943–1946
- Rank: First Lieutenant
- Units: 99th Fighter Squadron, 332nd Fighter Group
- Conflicts: World War II
- Awards: Distinguished Flying Cross; Air Medal (6); Legion of Honor (France)

Shelby F. Westbrook (January 15, 1922 – August 17, 2016) was a Tuskegee Airman who served in World War II.

== Early life ==
Shelby Westbrook was born in the small town of Marked Tree, Arkansas, on January 15, 1922. When he was twelve years old, his parents died. Shortly after, Westbrook moved to Toledo, Ohio, to live with his older brother. He attended Libbey High School, an integrated high school, graduating in 1939.

== United States Army Air Forces ==
=== Training ===
In March 1943, Westbrook enrolled in aviation cadet training at Tuskegee Army Air Field. He knew he did not want to be in the infantry, despite the fact he had never been in an airplane before. On February 8, 1944, he completed his pilot training (class 44-b) and was sent to Selfridge Air Field near Detroit, Michigan. During his time here, Second Lieutenant Westbrook trained in single-engine fighter planes.

=== Combat ===
Westbrook was attached to the 99th Fighter Squadron of the 332nd Fighter Group. This was one of the first all Black units formed by the Army Air Corps. After further training in South Carolina, the 99th Fighter Squadron was sent to Italy in July 1944. As a combat pilot, he flew 60 missions over 12 countries in Europe. Westbrook was promoted to first lieutenant, and served in the 332nd Fighter Group from July 1944 to May 1945.

On his 31st mission, his P-51 Mustang developed engine trouble. Westbrook was forced to land in Yugoslavia with his wingman, and was rescued by a group of Marshal Josip Broz Tito's Partisans. They were sent to a group of British Intelligence officers led by Randolph Churchill and Evelyn Waugh. About one month later he was back on duty.

On a strafing mission over southern France, Westbrook witnessed fellow pilot Richard Macon crash into a building near Montpellier. Because it happened so quickly, the U.S. had no record of it. More than fifty years later, Westbrook was able to confirm this happened as he was doing research with French-language materials. Macon had crashed into a German command outpost with more than 40 officers inside.

Westbrook traveled to Naples, Rome, and Vatican City on leave. He met the Pope when his group visited the Sistine Chapel.

== Awards ==
For his service in Europe, Westbrook was awarded the Distinguished Flying Cross, the Air Medal with five oak leaf clusters, the Presidential Unit Citation, the 15th Air Force Certificate of Valor, and five Battle Stars, as well as an air-to-air victory over a German Bf 109 fighter on October 4, 1944.

In 2007, Westbrook accepted a Congressional Gold Medal, which is the highest civilian award given by the United States Congress. On November 8, 2013, Westbrook was presented the French Legion of Honor, along with five other Chicago-area World War II veterans, for their "extraordinary bravery in liberating France during World War II."

== Later years ==
Westbrook returned to the United States in 1945. He had planned to attend engineering school, but was turned down by the director of the school as it would not accept black students. After this setback, Westbrook moved to Chicago and earned his Bachelor of Science degree in Electronics from the American Television Institute of Technology.

He was employed as an electrical engineer at W. R. Grace & Co., which was a major manufacturing facility that made packaging machines. During his 18 years there, Westbrook designed various types of electronic control circuits. He is listed as the co-inventor of a patented processing system that is still used.

He was the editor of the book, Tuskegee Airmen 1941–1945. Shelby Westbrook also wrote and published a book Bolo Pacha; the story of a double spy during World War I.

== Personal life ==
Shelby Westbrook married Lulu Bell Leonard in 1952. They resided on the South Side of Chicago in the same house until her death in 2006.

Westbrook died on August 17, 2016. His papers are held by the Chicago Public Library.

== External links and further reading ==
- Number of air craft lost by Tuskegee questioned at Air Force Times
- Shelby Westbrook at Army Air Corps Library and Museum
- Tuskegee Airmen watch their history on silver screen at ABC7 news
- McKissack, Patricia; McKissack, Fredrick (1995). Red-Tail Angels: The Story of the Tuskegee Airmen of World War II. New York: Walker and Company. ISBN 0-8027-8292-2.
- Westbrook, Shelby, ed. (1992). Tuskegee Airmen 1941–1945. Chicago: Tuskegee Airmen Inc.
