= Shelby Coffey III =

Journalist and business executive

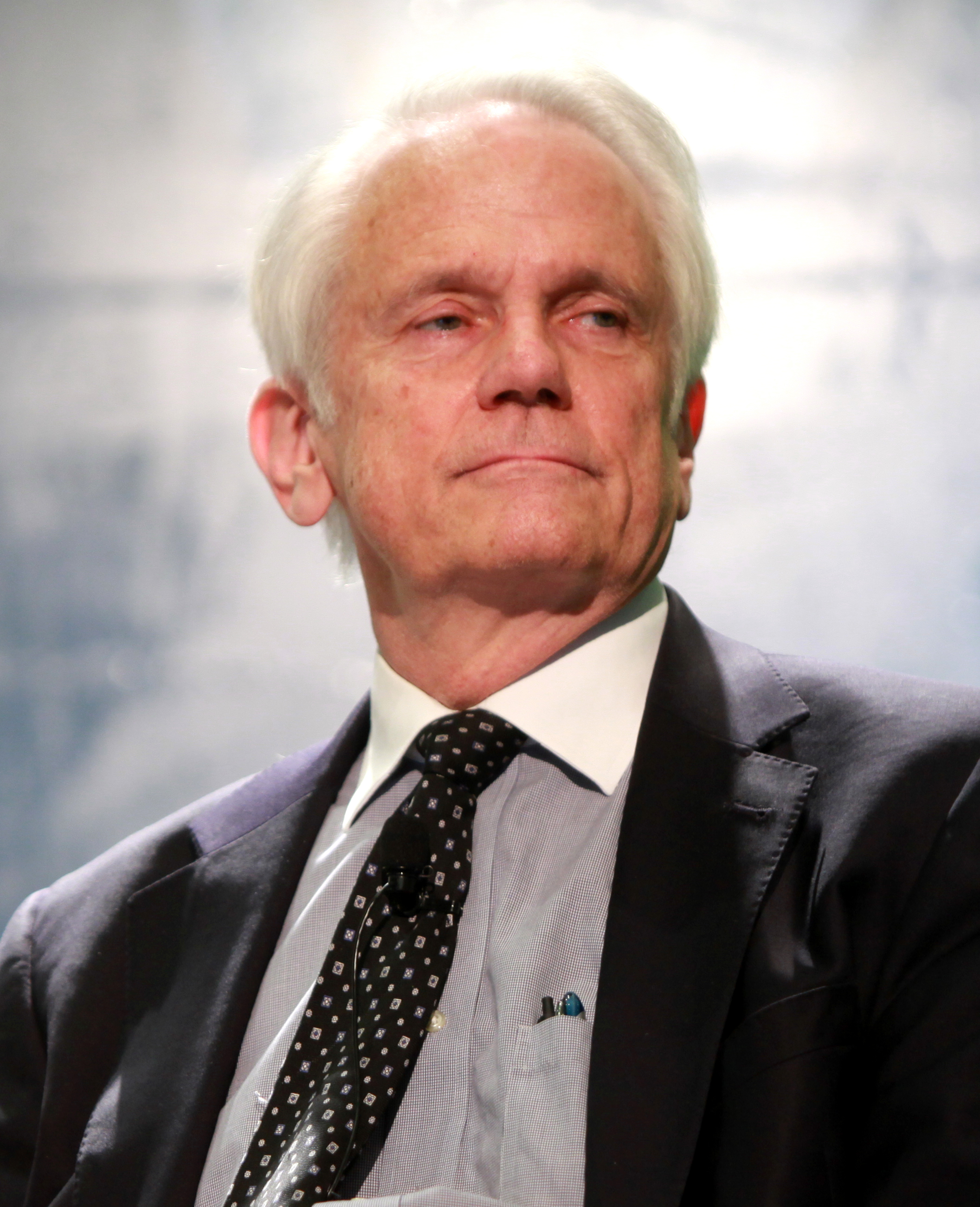
Coffey in 2014

Charles Shelby Coffey III (born either 1946 or 1947) is a journalist and business executive from Lookout Mountain, Tennessee, who is now a senior fellow of the Freedom Forum and a trustee of the Newseum in Washington, D.C. He was editor and executive vice president of the Los Angeles Times from 1989 to 1997. He has also been executive vice president of ABC News and was president of CNN Business News and CNNfn.

Earlier, Coffey was a reporter and editor at the Washington Post, where he spent 17 years, and then editor of U.S. News & World Report. He was also senior vice president and editor of the Dallas Times-Herald.

== Awards ==
In 1995 The National Press Foundation named Coffey as its Editor of the Year in recognition of coverage by the Los Angeles Times of the 1992 Los Angeles riots, the 1994 Northridge earthquake and the 1994 O.J. Simpson Trial.

He received the Ida B. Wells Award in 1995 "for exemplary achievement in the hiring and advancement of minorities in the news media."

== Memberships ==
Coffey is a member of the Council on Foreign Relations and the International Press Institute. He was on the board of the Pacific Council on International Policy.

== Controversies ==
During Coffey's time as editor of the L.A. Times, the paper published a lengthy three-part series examining the claims made in Gary Webb's 1996 "Dark Alliance" newspaper series. Webb had claimed that members of the Contra rebels in Nicaragua played a major role in creating the U.S. crack cocaine trade, using their smuggling profits to support their guerrilla war against Nicaragua's Sandinista government. The Times series found the "Dark Alliance" claims overstated, but was itself criticized, icncluding by its own journalists, for using anonymous sources, taking government claims too credulously, and failing to pursue Webb's story further.

== Publications ==
- The Art of Leadership in News Organizations
