= Marshall Creek =

Marshall Creek or Marshalls Creek may refer to:

- Marshall Creek (Tomichi Creek), a stream in Colorado
- Marshall Creek (North Moreau Creek), a stream in Missouri
- Marshall Creek, Texas, a neighborhood of Roanoke, Texas
- Marshall Creek (Latah Creek), a stream in Washington
- Marshalls Creek (Pennsylvania), a stream in Pennsylvania
- Marshalls Creek, Pennsylvania, an unincorporated community in Pennsylvania

== See also ==
- Marshallkreek, Suriname
