= Mountain Lake House =

Resort in Smithfield Township, Pennsylvania, USA

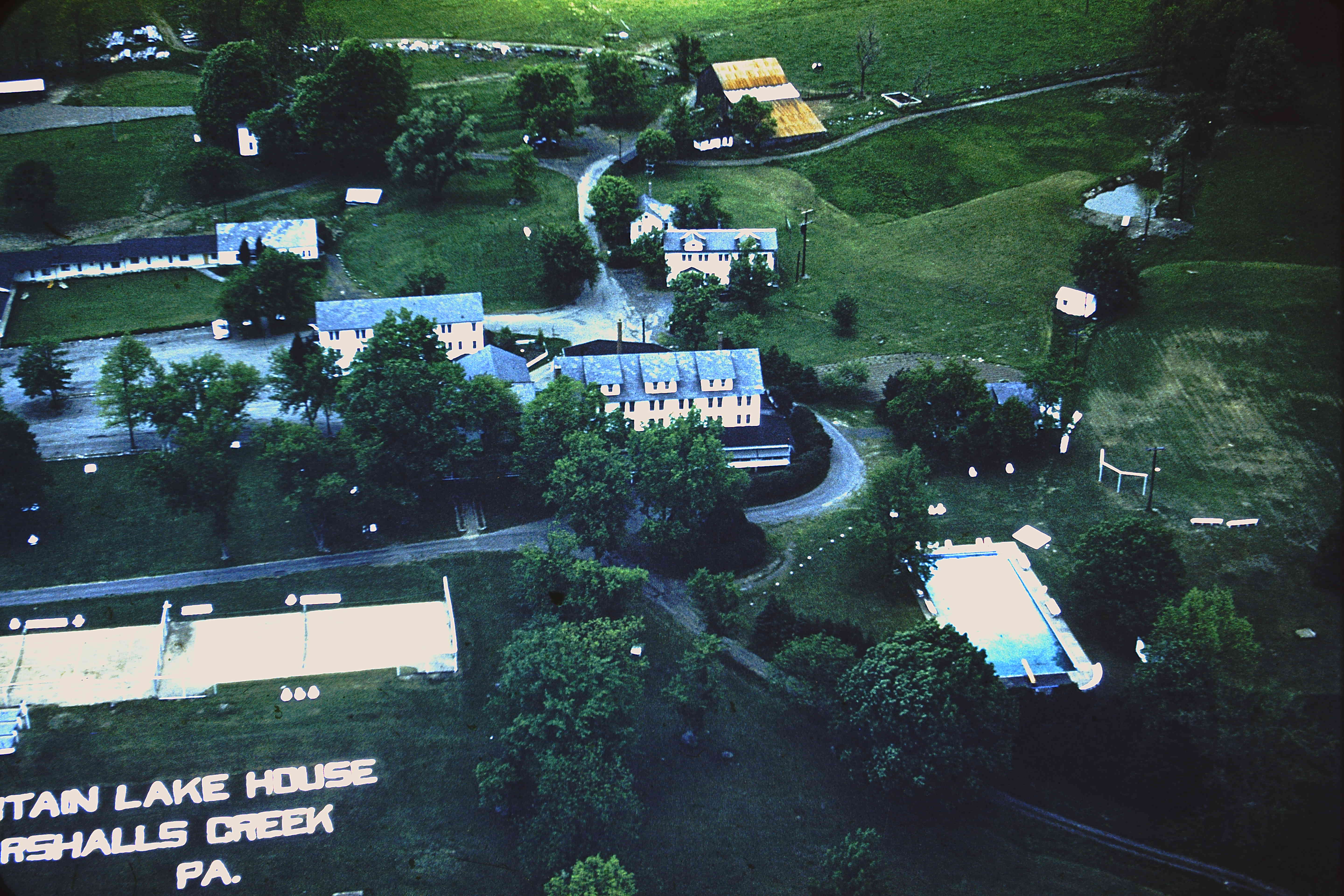
- Interactive map of the Mountain Lake House area

General information
- Location: Smithfield Township, Monroe County, Pennsylvania
- Coordinates: 41.046°N 75.124°W
- Opened: 1915

Mountain Lake House (MLH) is a former resort situated in Smithfield Township, Monroe County, Pennsylvania, at the junction of U.S. Route 209 and Pennsylvania Route 402 in Marshalls Creek, Pennsylvania. The location is situated approximately five miles (8.0 km) northeast of Stroudsburg. An Environmental Impact Study conducted in 1999 assessed the potential impact of a proposed road and described the Mountain Lake House as an estate spanning about 80.8 acres (32.7 ha), including approximately 18 outbuildings such as a musician's cabin, recreational hall, guest house, workshop, and others. It is currently closed.

== History ==
The history of Mountain Lake House can be traced back to 1902, when Harvey Huffman bought 113 acres of land outside Marshalls Creek village. One or two farmhouses were present on the north side of Pond Creek, which would later become Marshall Lake. A 12-room boarding house suitable for 30 guests was the main house described in 1915. Harvey's father, E.D. Huffman, managed several businesses in Marshalls Creek, including a hotel and general store. Norman, Harvey's brother, managed a lumber mill in Marshalls Creek, and Jay, another brother, ran a horse and carriage livery. Ice harvesting was a lucrative industry in the Poconos, so Harvey, Jay, and Norman planned to dam Pond Creek to harvest ice. They built a dam between 1904 and 1906 on the lands of Norman Huffman. Ice-harvesting continued until the 1920s. Jay Huffman acquired ownership of 34 acres of the original estate in 1906. The core of the Mountain Lake House was located on this lot. Jay and his wife Edith established the Lake Marshall Hotel as a summer boarding house and winter ice harvesting facility. Farmers who worked in ice harvesting operations typically lived in boarding houses during the winter. The name changed from Lake Marshall Hotel to Mountain Lake House between 1910 and 1911. The early tourists in the area came for cycling or motoring along the Milford Road, "taking the healing waters," swimming, boating, fishing, and hunting. Initially, the boarding house was managed by proprietors, including George Transue in 1911 and Farley Pipher who ran the business from 1914 to 1918. Jay Huffman took over the management of Mountain Lake House himself in 1918 and added a major addition to the east side of the original boarding house. With the help of his wife, Edith, and eight children, Mountain Lake House became one of the premiere full-service resorts in the Poconos. Between 1918 and 1924, many new buildings were added to the complex, including stables, auto and carriage liveries, the dance hall, the tennis courts, and additional guest quarters. The famous letters “Mountain Lake House” were added to the front lawn in the early 1930s. Shortly after “Marshalls Creek, Pa” was added beneath the Mountain Lake House letters.

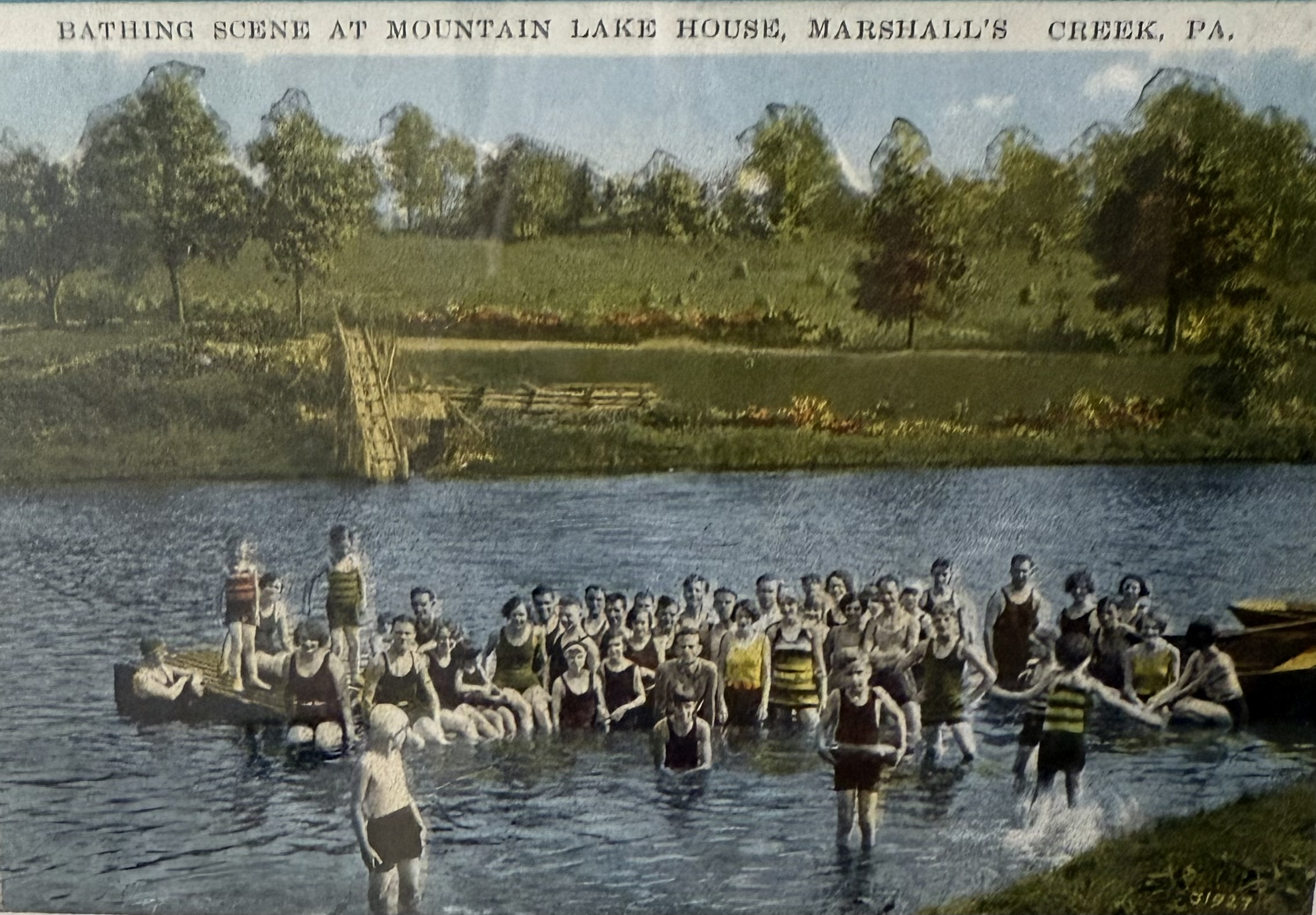
Resort guests swimming in Marshalls Lake in the early 1930s

The pool was added in 1937, and before that, guests swam in Marshall Lake.

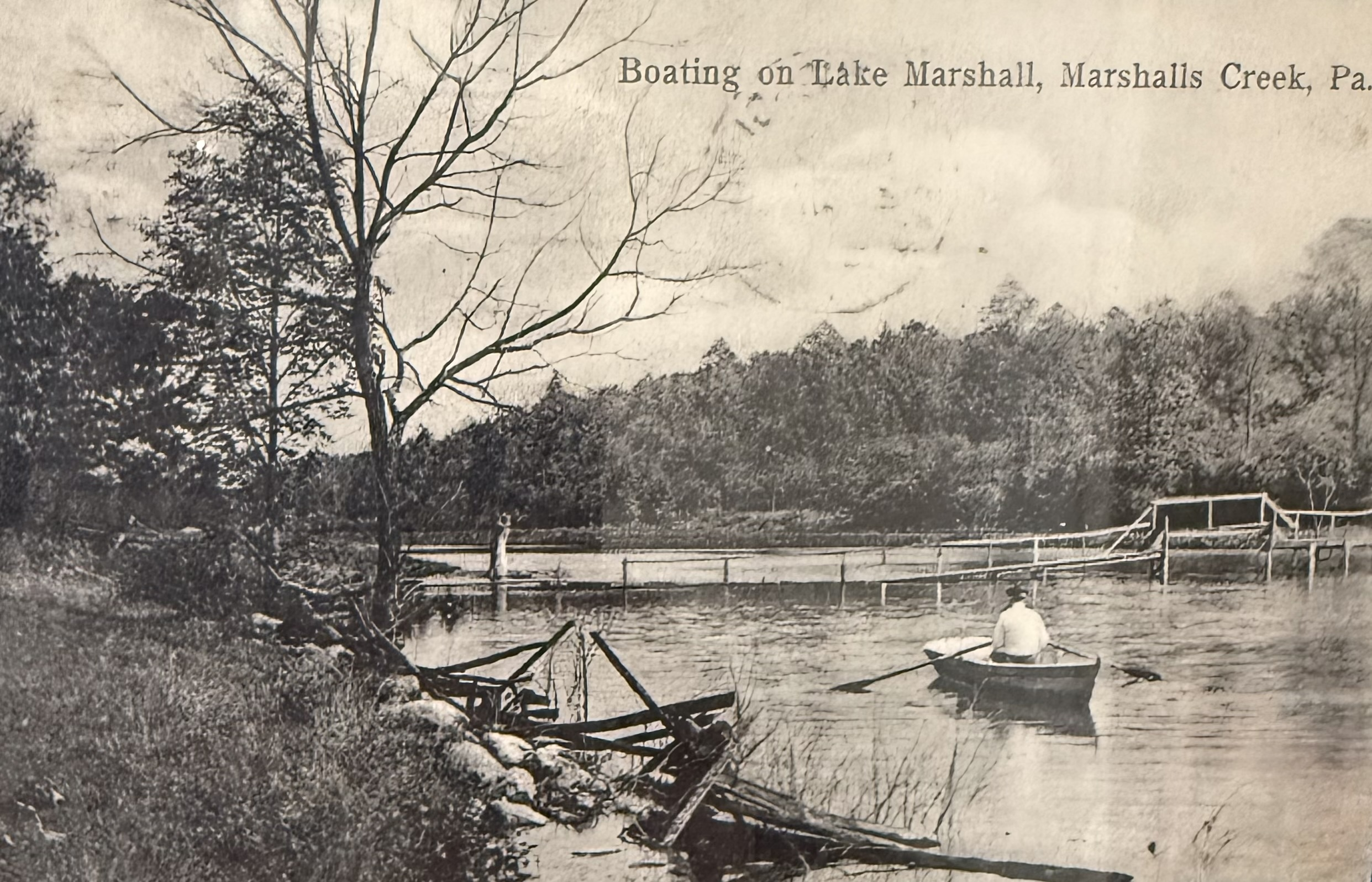
1911 Photo of Boating on Marshalls Lake in front of Mountain Lake House with footbridge in the background

There was even a swim platform out in the lake. From the very beginning of the lake, row boating was extremely popular. Even guests from neighboring hotels would come to use the row boats on the lake. A wooden footbridge, with an elevated section to allow boats to pass under, crossed over the lake from at least 1908 until perhaps the early 1950s. The footbridge followed the path of an old lane that crossed Pond Creek, leading from the Milford Road (Route 209) to the Mountain Lake House prior to the construction of the dam.

The cottage colony, consisting of eight bungalows off Route 402, was constructed in 1925, and each bungalow was named after one of Jay's children. It had none of the amenities of Mountain Lake House, but its residents enjoyed the use of the facilities that Mountain Lake House offered. In 1940, Jay Huffman died, and the ownership of MLH passed to his wife, Edith. Jay's son, Elwood, took over the management of Mountain Lake House at this time. Around 1943, Edith added the property known as "The Marshalls Falls House" to the family's growing resort business. They changed the name of the building to "The Village Inn," a luxury country accommodation that could house 140 guests and had a gift shop and ornate billiards room. It was managed by Norman Huffman until it was replaced by a shopping center in February 1980.

In 1961, Norman Huffman, Jay’s son and Elwood’s brother, added management of Mountain Lake House to his already busy schedule. During the 1960s the Lake Side Motel was added. Norman continued to manage the property until his brother, Carlyle, purchased the Mountain Lake House holdings from the rest of the family and installed his son, Bob, as manager in 1971.

In 1982, Carlyle Huffman sold Mountain Lake House to the Farda family. They changed the name of the property to "Mountain Lake Resort" at that time, but the famous letters remained the same. In the 1980s the Fardas built an indoor pool addition on the West side of the original main building. They also added a small mini golf course and playground.

Mountain Lake House officially closed its doors for the last time in September 2000. The resort remained idle until it was sold to Richard Blewitt in 2004. Mr. Blewitt's dream of reopening the resort (to be called Rich's Promise) as a haven for the families of active-duty military personnel was never to be realized.

In 2004 vandals burned down the Rec Hall and in 2006 the Marshalls Creek Volunteer Fire Department demolished the remaining wood-frame structures in a controlled burn.

The only remaining structures on the property are the pool, a barn, the tennis courts and the Lakeside Motel. Vegetation is quickly taking over the site and hiding what little remains. The asphalt lanes and parking lots are the only areas resistant to the growth of vegetation, otherwise the site is largely unrecognizable and inaccessible.

== Historic activities ==
The Mountain View Trolley Line had a stop at the resort.

Big Band leader Harry James was one of the celebrities who visited Mountain Lake House.

The Mountain Lake House provided various recreational activities such as tennis courts, volleyball, shuffleboard, an arcade, bocci ball, basketball, softball, golfing, putt-putt golf, boating, a pool, a dance hall, and a movie room. In the late 1980s, an indoor pool and sauna/hot tub were added.

== Preservation ==
The Pennsylvania Historical Museum Commission's Bureau for Historic Preservation recognized the Mountain Lake House Resort as eligible for protection.

== See also ==
- Monroe County, Pennsylvania
- U.S. Route 209 Business (Stroudsburg, Pennsylvania)
