= Pennsylvania Route 402 =

State highway in Pennsylvania, US

Pennsylvania Route 402
- PA 402 in red and PA 402 Truck in blue

Route information
- Maintained by PennDOT
- Length: 29.240 mi (47.057 km)
- Existed: 1928–present

Major junctions
- South end: US 209 Bus. in Smithfield Township
- I-84 in Blooming Grove Township
- North end: US 6 in Palmyra Township

Location
- Country: United States
- State: Pennsylvania
- Counties: Monroe, Pike

Highway system
- Pennsylvania State Route System; Interstate; US; State; Scenic; Legislative
| ← PA 401 | → PA 403 |

Pennsylvania Route 402 (PA 402) is a 29.24-mile (47.06 km) north–south state route in the Pennsylvania counties of Monroe and Pike. The southern terminus of the route is at U.S. Route 209 Business (US 209 Bus.) in the Smithfield Township village of Marshalls Creek. The northern terminus is at US 6 in Palmyra Township.

PA 402 was designated in 1928 between US 611 north of Delaware Water Gap and US 6 in Palmyra Township. The route at the southern terminus became PA 612 in the 1930s before PA 402 was extended south to US 611 (now PA 611 in Delaware Water Gap in the 1940s, replacing a portion of PA 612. PA 402 was realigned to end at an interchange with Interstate 80 (I-80) and US 611 in Delaware Water Gap by 1961. The southern terminus was cut back to US 209 in Marshalls Creek in the summer of 1962, with most of the former route south of there becoming a realigned US 209.

In 1991, a proposal to realign PA 402 and US 209 around the village of Marshalls Creek was proposed. Originally, PA 402 ended at a junction with US 209 and US 209 Business in Marshalls Creek. Over the years, the junction and the village had become heavily congested and a bypass was the only way to relieve traffic. After numerous delays for environmental issues, PA 402's new alignment had construction begin in 2005. Construction was suspended in 2008 and abandoned as PennDOT wanted a new bypass constructed without a realignment of PA 402. The new bypass was completed in June 2012, when US 209 was realigned away from the southern terminus of PA 402, which ended at US 209 Bus. instead.

== Route description ==
PA 402 begins at a junction with US 209 Bus. (Milford Road or SR 2012) in the village of Marshalls Creek in Smithfield Township. PA 402 proceeds north along Resica Falls Road, leaving the village of Marshalls Creek after crossing the namesake tributary. Soon crossing into Middle Smithfield Township, PA 402 bends northeast, crossing south of White Heron Lake and through the lakeside residential area. At Oak Grove Drive, PA 402 bends northward again, passing a small pond and bypassing Pocono Highlands Lake after turning northeast at Coolbaugh Drive.

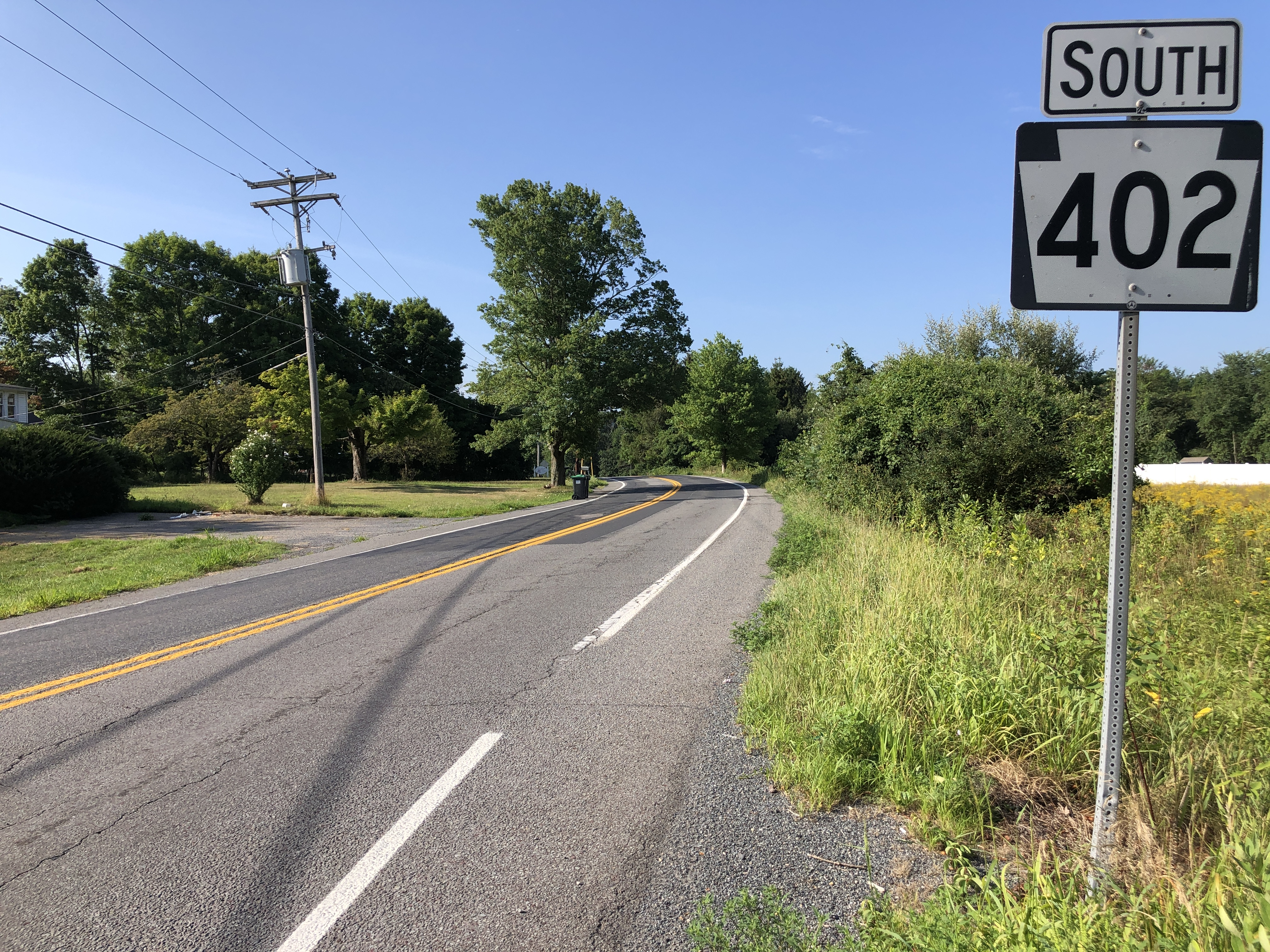
PA 402 southbound in Middle Smithfield Township

PA 402 soon reaches the village of Poplar Bridge, reaching the Middle Smithfield Township Park at the north end of the village. Passing the Country Club of the Poconos, the route turns northward through a residential area surrounded by woods. This soon recedes to just woods, soon crossing over the Bush Kill, right next to Resica Falls, which drop less than a 0.25-mile (0.40 km) from the roadway. North of the Bush Kill, the route passes Timber Mountain Drive and soon returns to the dense woods before crossing the county line from Monroe County to Pike County. Now in Porter Township, crossing through the dense woods until passing Twelvemile Pond.

The route winds northward through woods in Porter Township for several miles, passing a small parking lot and a junction with Old Bushkill Road. After a bend to the northwest, PA 402 reaches Porters Lake, a large lake marking the center of Porter Township. The route then moves northwest and crosses Pickerel Lake. PA 402 continues northwest through more woodlands, soon reaching the village of Pecks Pond, a residential community on the southwest end of the namesake pond. At the junction with Ness Road, PA 402 turns northeast along the lakeshore, soon passing a junction with a former alignment of itself. The route crosses into Blooming Grove Township, continuing northwest through the rural portions of Pike County.

The route soon bends north, passing through woods east of Lake Scott, soon reaching an interchange with I-84 (exit 30; formerly 8). Just north of the interchange, PA 402 intersects with SR 4004, which connects to PA 434 and PA 739 at its eastern terminus. The route winds northward through Blooming Grove Township, passing White Deer Lake Access, soon bending northwest again. The route bends northward, crossing into Palmyra Township, soon reaching a clearing and a junction with US 6. This junction serves as the northern terminus of PA 402, just east of the junction with PA 507.

== History ==
PA 402 was assigned by the Pennsylvania Department of Highways in the 1928 renumbering of state highways in the commonwealth of Pennsylvania. The route at the time of designation, was assigned from US 611 at the Brodhead Creek north of Delaware Water Gap to US 6 in Palmyra Township, just outside the village of Friendly Acres, crossing US 209 in the village of Marshalls Creek. At this time, the entire length of the route was unpaved. However, the route, not up to state standards, was completely under construction to meet said standards, with the portion between Marshalls Creek and Snowhill Road at Twelvemile Pond being completed in 1931. The following year, 1932, the portion between Twelvemile Pond and US 6 was completed. The section between Delaware Water Gap and Marshalls Creek was completed in the 1930s. By this time, the southern terminus was at PA 612 after that route swapped alignments with US 611. PA 402 was extended south along Paper Mill Road to end at US 611 (now PA 611) in Delaware Water Gap in the 1940s after the PA 612 designation was decommissioned. By 1961, PA 402 was realigned to use River Road between an interchange with I-80 and US 611 in Delaware Water Gap and north of the Brodhead Creek. On June 1, 1962, the southern terminus of PA 402 was cut back to US 209 in Marshalls Creek, with the section between Minisink Hills and Marshalls Creek becoming a realigned US 209 while the former alignment south of there is now unnumbered River Road and Gap View Drive.

=== Marshalls Creek Bypass ===
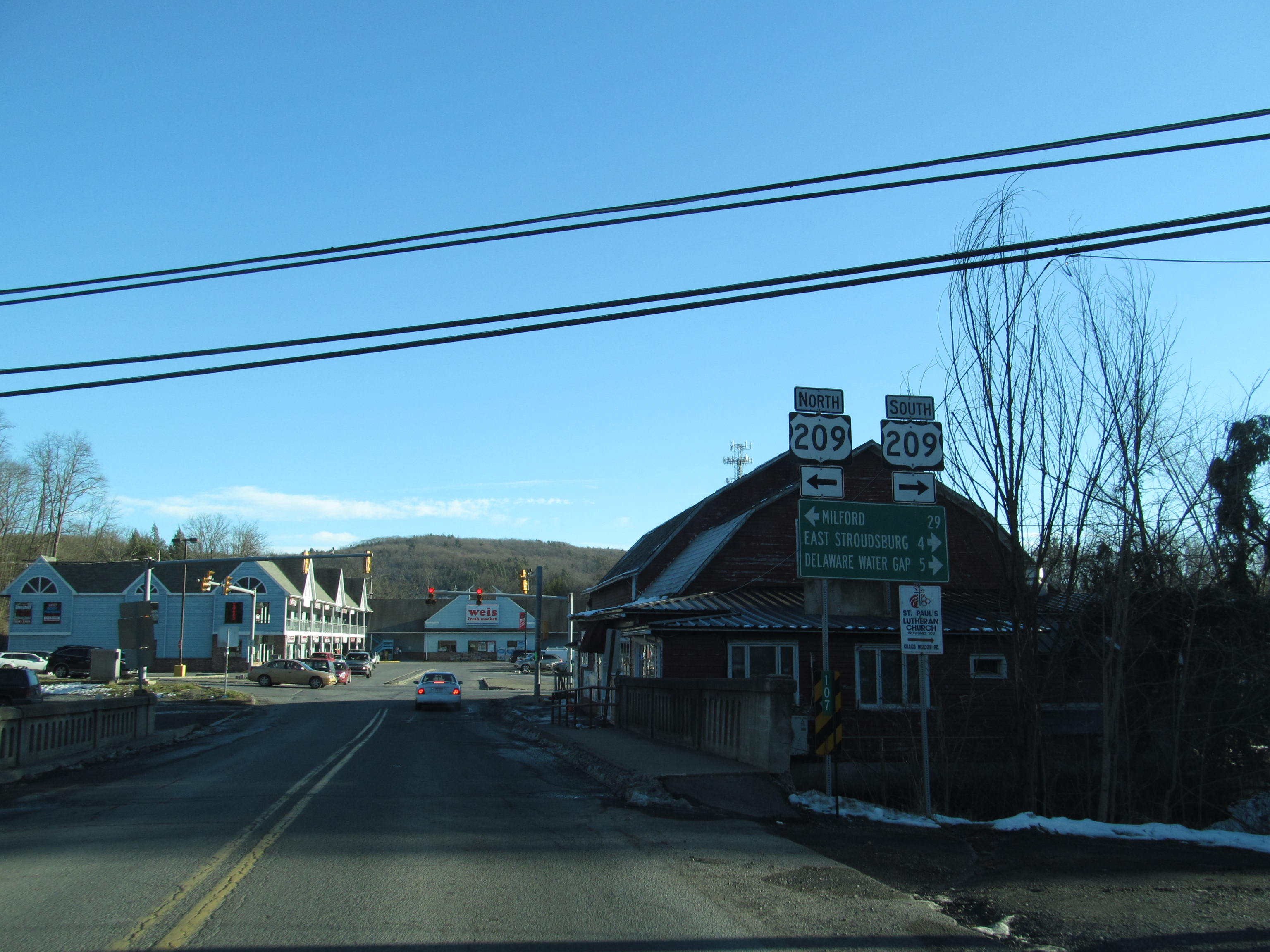
The southern terminus of PA 402 as seen in January 2013. US 209 signage had not been replaced by US 209 Bus. signage, but has since

A bypass of the southern terminus of PA 402 was proposed in 1991 to deter traffic off the congested intersection with US 209 and US 209 Bus. in the village of Marshalls Creek. The same year, the Pennsylvania Department of Transportation (PennDOT) got involved in the feasibility study, and preliminary engineering work was finished in 1995. The project, notorious for delays, first hit a barrier in 1997, when a pair of species of endangered fish (Bridle shiners and Iron-colored shiners) were found in Marshalls Creek. In 2000, after a Final Environmental Impact Statement had been completed, the route was approved by the Federal Highway Administration. In 2004, a delay was created again, when pyrite was found in the area, which led to engineers finding a way to not harm the fish in Marshalls Creek.

By that point, the project had been delayed to opening in 2008, 17 years after the proposal had been developed. Construction began on the new bypass of Marshalls Creek in 2005, with Phase I of the project, which wrapped up in 2007 under the eye of J.D. Eckman Inc., an Atglen-based contractor. The original bypass plan had PA 402 being realigned at the junction with Oak Grove Drive, onto a new alignment that would have crossed over the Marshalls Creek and terminated at an interchange with US 209 at the northern end of the bypass. In 2008, officials at PennDOT thought about a smaller bypass proposal, which would connect US 209 and US 209 Bus. and not cross Pond Creek.

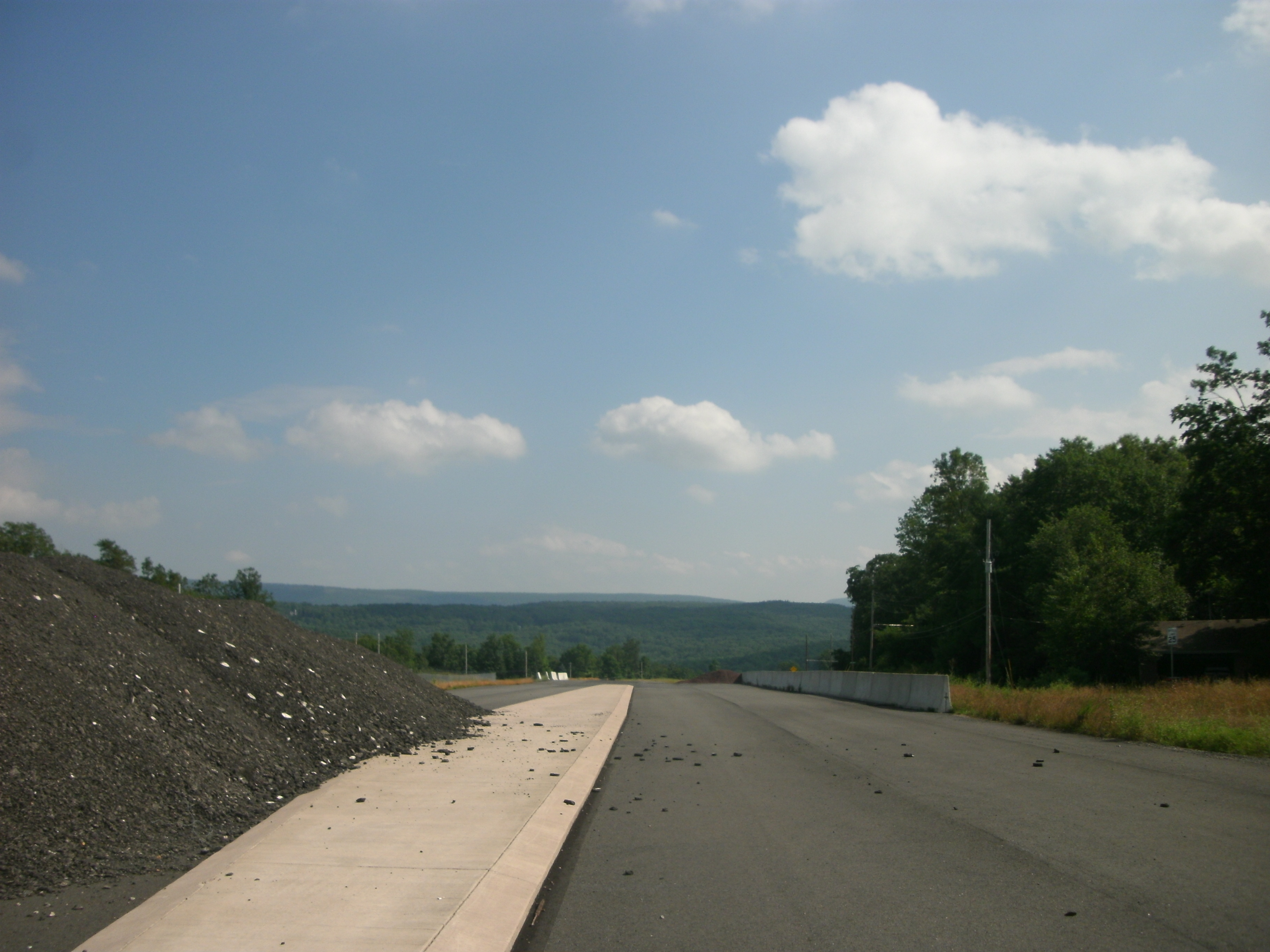
The abandoned alignment of PA 402 in Middle Smithfield Township

At the same time, work was suspended in April for rising costs of the new bypass. Instead of costing $68 million (2008 USD), the cost of the new bypass had inflated to $200 million and the future of the project came into question. This upset local residents, who sold their land for the construction of the 3.5-mile-long (5.6 km) bypass, which was partially constructed for PA 402. Locals, some of whom who had been in the area for decades, started comparing the bypass shutdown as another version of the Tocks Island Dam project from 1956–1992, which led to numerous demonstrations to protect the Delaware River. At this point, PennDOT had to scale down the project and had no intent of the new PA 402 alignment to an interchange being finished, after grading and paving for the new alignment had already been started on the new alignment.

The Marshalls Creek Bypass was redesigned as a new project with a new park and ride at the Pocono Bazaar to the northeast of Marshalls Creek with an extended Oak Grove Drive, which would run around the back of the Bazaar and come to a new intersection with US 209 and a new bypass of the village of Marshalls Creek of US 209 only. Construction on the park and ride began in 2009, marking the beginning of the third and final phase of the project. Construction on the US 209 bypass was slated for Spring 2010, with a 2.5 year span of completion at the cost of $20 million (2009 USD). The bypass opened on June 11, 2012, and PA 402's southern terminus became US 209 Bus. as US 209 was rerouted onto the new bypass.

== Major intersections ==
| County | Location | mi | km | Destinations | Notes |
|---|---|---|---|---|---|
| Monroe | Smithfield Township | 0.000 | 0.000 | US 209 Bus. (Milford Road) – Milford, East Stroudsburg, Delaware Water Gap | Southern terminus; village of Marshalls Creek |
| Pike | Blooming Grove Township | 24.616– 24.660 | 39.616– 39.686 | I-84 – Scranton, Milford | Exit 30 (I-84). Formerly exit 8. |
| Pike | Palmyra Township | 29.240 | 47.057 | US 6 | Northern terminus |
1.000 mi = 1.609 km; 1.000 km = 0.621 mi

== PA 402 Truck ==
Pennsylvania Route 402 Truck
- Location: Pike County, Pennsylvania
- Existed: 2013–present

Pennsylvania Route 402 Truck is a truck route around a weight-restricted bridge over the Shohola Creek on which trucks over 34 tons and combination loads over 40 tons are prohibited. It follows Silver Lake Road, PA 739. and I-84. The route was signed in 2013.

== See also ==
- Mountain Lake House
