= Johann Eyer =

American painter

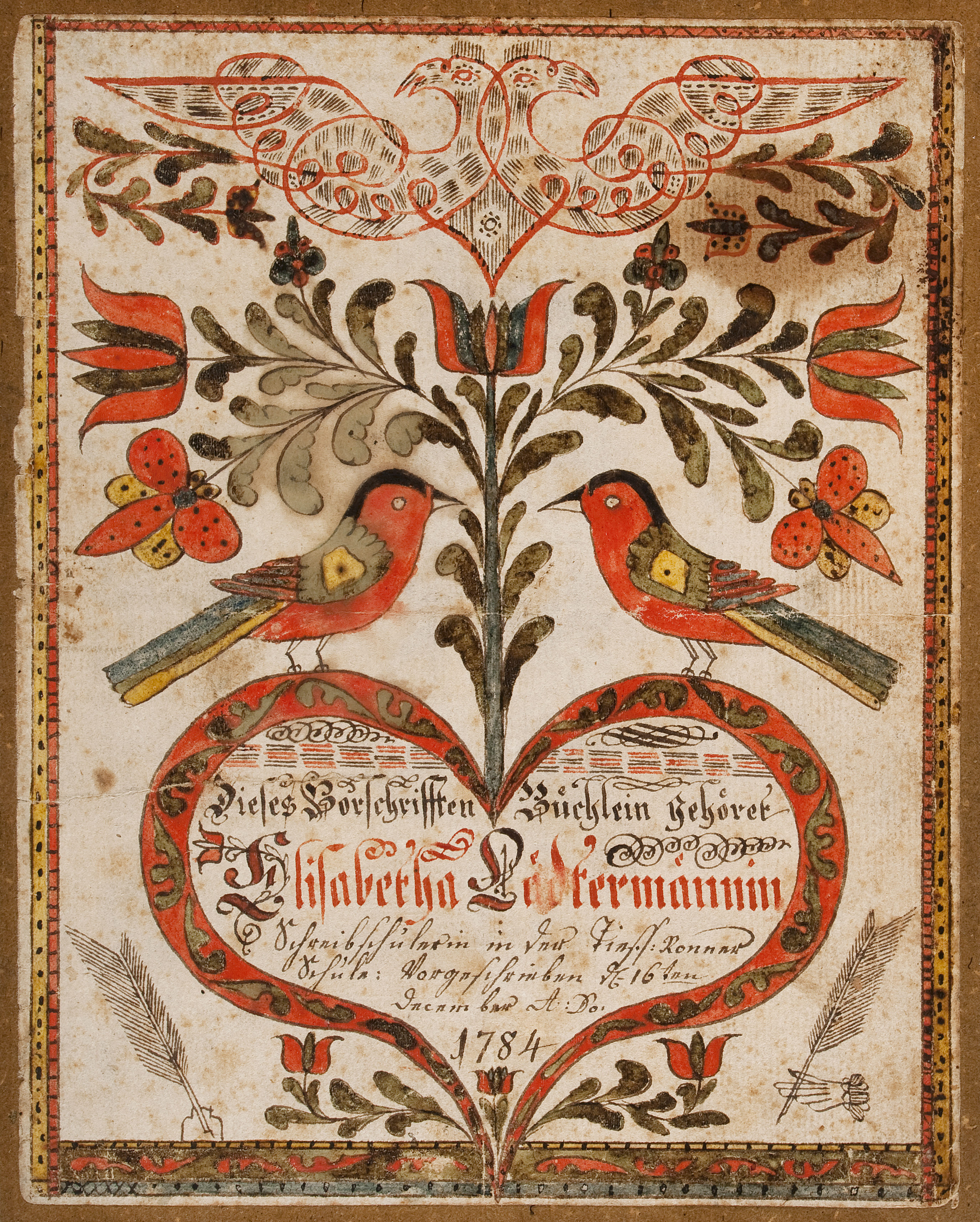
Cover for a Book of Copy Models, in the Barnes Foundation collection in Philadelphia

Johann Adam Eyer (1755–1837) was an American fraktur artist.

== Early life and education ==
Eyer was a native of Bedminster Township in Bucks County, Pennsylvania. During his career, he taught school in Chester and Lancaster Counties, but in 1786 moved with his entire family to Upper Mount Bethel Township in Northampton County, where he took a position at the Lutheran school. The family moved again in 1801, settling in Hamilton Township in Monroe County, Pennsylvania.

== Career ==
Eyer became a schoolteacher and clerk at Christ Hamilton Lutheran Church in Hamilton Township, Pennsylvania. He never married and remained in Hamilton Township until his death; during his career he taught in Mennonite and Lutheran schools.

Eyer was the eldest son of the family, and in this position presided over the estate of his parents. With his brother Ludwig acting as agent, he founded and developed the town of Bloomsburg, Pennsylvania in 1802. Another brother, Johann Frederick, was a schoolmaster and organist who also produced fraktur. Eyer was friends as well with Andreas Kolb, another fraktur artist and Mennonite minister, with whom he exchanged artworks. In addition to his teaching activities, he was a successful businessman.

Eyer produced hundreds of pieces of fraktur during his career, initially copying pieces produced by Mennonite or Schwenkfelder artists who created writing samples for their students. These he would fold to make a booklet, with four pages and a cover. Cutting a larger sheet in half lengthwise allowed him to produce a book of musical notation, a skill which he passed on to his pupils as well. Later in life he also produced hymnal bookplates, baptismal records, and presentation drawings, as well as illustrated poems. Also extant is a drawing of a soldier's wedding. The Mennonite Heritage Center owns several of his works. Three works are held by the American Folk Art Museum, while 14 are in the Winterthur Museum. Twelve pieces are owned by the Philadelphia Museum of Art, or have been promised to the museum.

Eyer's school roster book survives and has been translated for publication.
