= Christ Hamilton United Lutheran Church and Cemetery =

Historic church in Pennsylvania, United States

- U.S. National Register of Historic Places
- U.S. Historic district
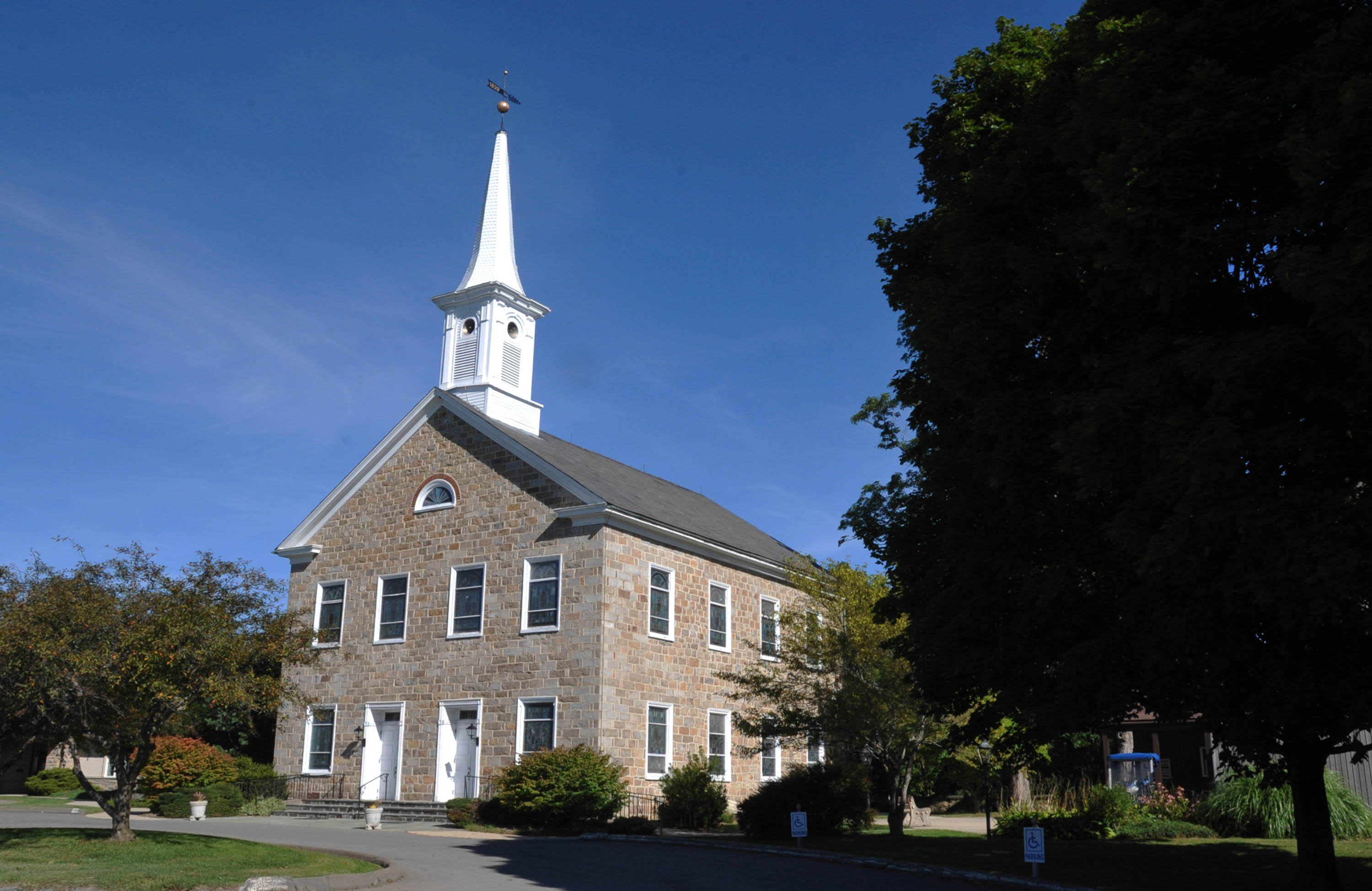

- Location within Pennsylvania Location within the United States
- Location: Bossardsville Rd., Hamilton Township, Pennsylvania
- Coordinates: 40°55′33″N 75°17′24″W
- Built: 1829
- Architect: Henry Fenner, Peter Kester
- NRHP reference No.: 80003573
- Added to NRHP: June 11, 1980

Christ Hamilton United Lutheran Church and Cemetery is a national historic district consisting of a Lutheran / Reformed church and cemetery in Hamilton Township, Monroe County, Pennsylvania. The church was built in 1829, and is a 2 1/2-story, fieldstone building measuring 50 feet by 40 feet. It features a slate roof and rectangular steeple with delicate spire. Church records indicate that the cemetery was laid out in 1775, making it the oldest cemetery in Stroudsburg. The cemetery has 105 limestone headstones inscribed mostly in German. Burials date from 1793 to 1875. Fraktur artist Johann Adam Eyer was a clerk and teacher at the church.

The church and cemetery were added to the National Register of Historic Places in 1980.
