= Quiet Valley Farm =

- U.S. National Register of Historic Places
- U.S. Historic district
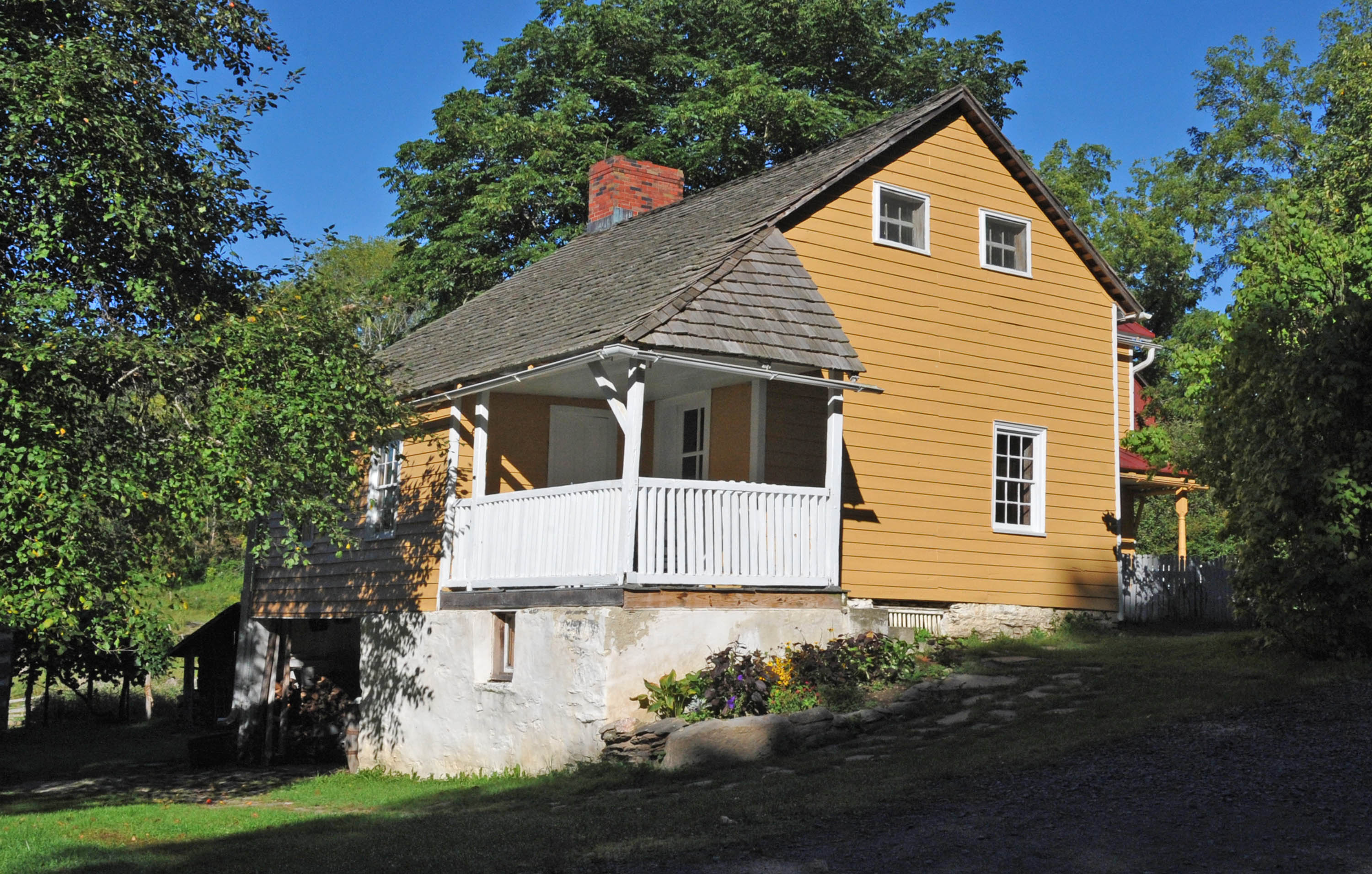

- Location within Pennsylvania Location within the United States
- Location: Southwest of Stroudsburg off U.S. Route 209, Hamilton Township, Pennsylvania
- Coordinates: 40°57′25″N 75°15′03″W
- Area: 72 acres (29 ha)
- Built: 1765
- Architectural style: Bank Barn Style
- NRHP reference No.: 73001642
- Added to NRHP: April 23, 1973

The Quiet Valley Farm is an historic working farm in Hamilton Township, Monroe County, Pennsylvania, United States. It is operated as an open-air museum. Open seasonally, costumed interpreters operate the farm and explain family life from the 1760s to 1913.

It was added to the National Register of Historic Places in 1973.

== History and notable features ==
The farm is a national historic district located in Hamilton Township, Monroe County, Pennsylvania, United States. It includes nine contributing buildings that were located on a homestead that was purchased by Johan Peter Zepper (Topper) in 1765. It remained in the Zepper family until 1958, and is now operated as a nineteenth-century, living history farm known as the Quiet Valley Living Historical Farm.

Contributing buildings are the main house (c. 1765), the springhouse (c. 1765), a bank barn (1850), the frame wash house, a fruit drying house, a smoke house, an ice house, a storage shed, and a wagon shed.
