= Marshalls Creek, Pennsylvania =

Unincorporated community in Pennsylvania, US

- Unincorporated community
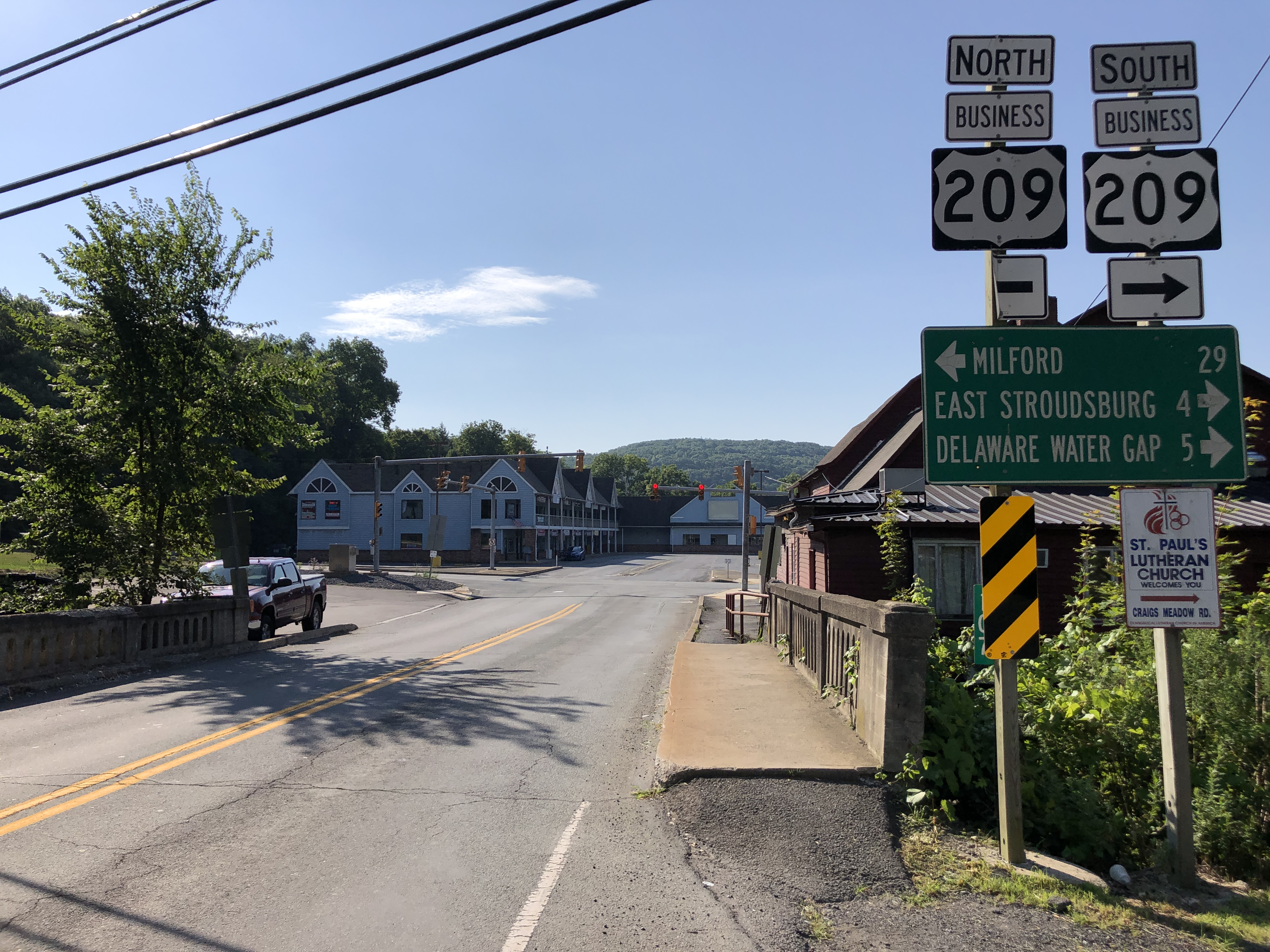
- PA 402 at US 209 Bus. in Marshalls Creek

- Location within Pennsylvania Location within the United States
- Coordinates: 41°02′35″N 75°07′39″W
- Country: United States
- State: Pennsylvania
- County: Monroe
- Township: Smithfield
- Elevation: 479 ft (146 m)
- Time zone: UTC-5 (Eastern (EST))
  - Summer (DST): UTC-4 (EDT)
- ZIP code: 18335
- Area codes: 570 and 272
- GNIS feature ID: 1180465

Marshalls Creek is an unincorporated community in Monroe County, Pennsylvania, United States. It is located on Business U.S. Route 209 at the southern terminus of Route 402 in Smithfield Township. It is named after the creek that flows southward through it into the Delaware River. Business 209 joins the 209 bypass just east of the village. A roundabout is located just south of the village where the Bypass and Seven Bridges Road meet. Although the village has its own box post office with the zip code of 18335, some residents are served by the East Stroudsburg PO with the zip code of 18301 or 18302.

== 1964 explosion ==
On June 26, 1964, Marshalls Creek was the site of a dynamite truck that exploded and killed six people. After the truck had blown two tires, the driver pulled off the road in front of a reptile farm, without realizing that the tires were smoldering, and went to find a pay phone. Three volunteer firemen were killed in the blast, along with a nearby resident, a passing motorist, and another truck driver who had spotted the fire.

== See also ==
- Mountain Lake House
