= Hamilton Township, Monroe County, Pennsylvania =

Township in Pennsylvania, US

- Township
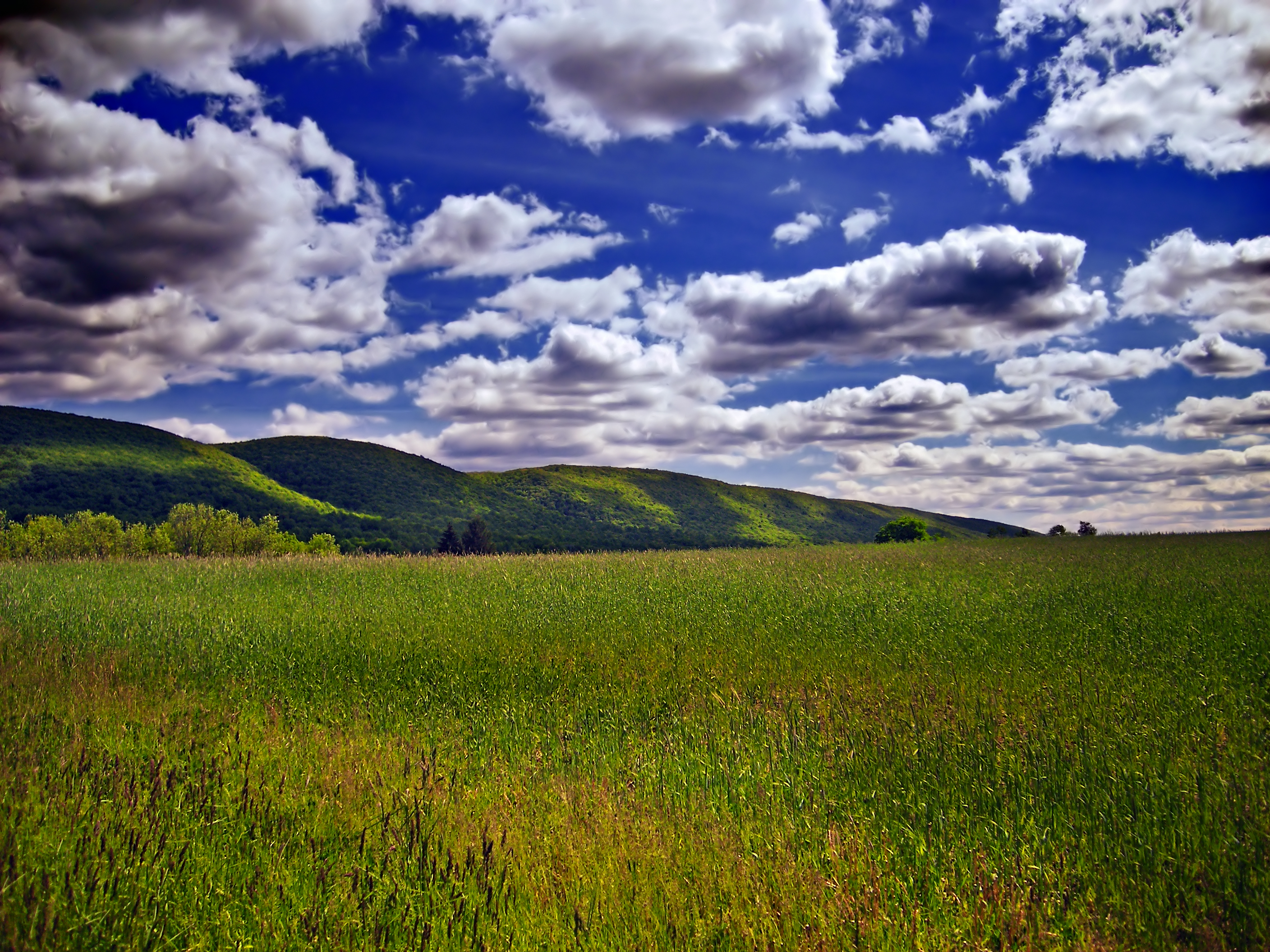
- A Hamilton Township vista

- Location of Pennsylvania in the United States
- Coordinates: 40°52′29″N 75°16′59″W
- Country: United States
- State: Pennsylvania
- County: Monroe

Area
  - Total: 38.50 sq mi (99.72 km^{2})
  - Land: 38.32 sq mi (99.25 km^{2})
  - Water: 0.18 sq mi (0.47 km^{2})
- Elevation: 1,286 ft (392 m)

Population (2020)
  - Total: 8,635 ▼
  - Estimate (2021): 8,678
  - Density: 229.1/sq mi (88.45/km^{2})
- Time zone: UTC-5 (EST)
  - Summer (DST): UTC-4 (EDT)
- Area code: 570
- FIPS code: 42-089-32176
- Website: www.hamiltontwp.org

Hamilton Township is a township in Monroe County, Pennsylvania, United States. The population was 8,635 at the 2020 census.

== History ==
The Christ Hamilton United Lutheran Church and Cemetery, Fenner–Snyder Mill, and Quiet Valley Farm are listed on the National Register of Historic Places.

== Geography ==
According to the United States Census Bureau, the township has a total area of 38.5 square miles (100 km^{2}), of which 38.3 square miles (99 km^{2}) is land and 0.2 square miles (0.52 km^{2}) (0.42%) is water. The township contains the unincorporated communities of Blue Mountain Pines, Bossardsville, Hamilton Square, Kellersville, Kemmererville, Sandhill, Sciota, Snydersville, and Stormville, plus a portion of Saylorsburg.

== Demographics ==
Historical population
Census	Pop.	Note	%±
2000	8,235		—
2010	9,083		10.3%
2020	8,635		−4.9%
2021 (est.)	8,678		0.5%
U.S. Decennial Census

As of the census of 2000, there were 8,235 people, 2,947 households, and 2,207 families residing in the township. The population density was 215.0 inhabitants per square mile (83.0/km^{2}). There were 3,299 housing units at an average density of 86.1 per square mile (33.2/km^{2}). The racial makeup of the township was 94.92% White, 2.43% African American, 0.10% Native American, 1.00% Asian, 0.05% Pacific Islander, 0.67% from other races, and 0.84% from two or more races. Hispanic or Latino of any race were 2.78% of the population.

There were 2,947 households, out of which 33.6% had children under the age of 18 living with them, 63.9% were married couples living together, 7.3% had a female householder with no husband present, and 25.1% were non-families. 19.5% of all households were made up of individuals, and 7.4% had someone living alone who was 65 years of age or older. The average household size was 2.64 and the average family size was 3.05.

In the township the population was spread out, with 23.8% under the age of 18, 6.3% from 18 to 24, 29.6% from 25 to 44, 26.8% from 45 to 64, and 13.4% who were 65 years of age or older. The median age was 40 years. For every 100 females, there were 102.0 males. For every 100 females age 18 and over, there were 100.9 males.

The median income for a household in the township was $47,327, and the median income for a family was $54,955. Males had a median income of $42,847 versus $26,141 for females. The per capita income for the township was $22,153. About 5.1% of families and 6.4% of the population were below the poverty line, including 7.7% of those under age 18 and 8.8% of those age 65 or over.

United States presidential election results for Hamilton Township, Monroe County, Pennsylvania
Year	Republican		Democratic		Third party(ies)	
Year	No.	%	No.	%	No.	%
2024	2,809	56.27%	2,131	42.69%	52	1.04%
2020	2,610	53.98%	2,160	44.67%	65	1.34%
2016	2,373	56.62%	1,688	40.28%	130	3.10%
2012	1,921	51.75%	1,747	47.06%	44	1.19%
2008	1,909	49.19%	1,921	49.50%	51	1.31%
2004	1,890	54.11%	1,580	45.23%	23	0.66%
2000	1,583	52.07%	1,347	44.31%	110	3.62%

== Climate ==
According to the Trewartha climate classification system, Hamilton Township has a Temperate Continental climate (Dc) with hot summers (a), cold winters (o) and year-around precipitation (Dcao). Dcao climates are characterized by at least one month having an average mean temperature ≤ 32.0 °F (0 °C), four to seven months with an average mean temperature ≥ 50.0 °F (10 °C), at least one month with an average mean temperature ≥ 72.0 °F (22 °C) and no significant precipitation difference between seasons. Although most summer days are slightly humid in Hamilton Township, episodes of heat and high humidity can occur with heat index values > 101 °F (38 °C). Since 1981, the highest air temperature has been 99.8 °F (38 °C), on July 22, 2011, and the highest daily average mean dew point was 72.5 °F (23 °C) on August 28, 2018. July is the peak month for thunderstorm activity, which correlates with the average warmest month of the year. The average wettest month is September, which correlates with tropical storm remnants during the peak of the Atlantic hurricane season. Since 1981, the wettest calendar day has been 6.22 inches, (158 mm) on October 8, 2005. During the winter months, the plant hardiness zone is 6a, with an average annual extreme minimum air temperature of −6.8 °F (−22 °C). Since 1981, the coldest air temperature has been−18.2 °F (−28 °C) on January 21, 1994. Episodes of extreme cold and wind can occur, with wind chill values < −19 °F (−28 °C). The average snowiest month is January, which correlates with the average coldest month of the year. Ice storms and large snowstorms depositing ≥ 12 inches (30 cm) of snow occur once every couple of years, particularly during nor’easters from December through March.

Climate data for Hamilton Twp, Elevation 676 ft (206 m), 1981-2010 normals, extremes 1981-2018
Month	Jan	Feb	Mar	Apr	May	Jun	Jul	Aug	Sep	Oct	Nov	Dec	Year
Record high °F (°C)	67.6 (19.8)	76.6 (24.8)	85.6 (29.8)	93.1 (33.9)	93.7 (34.3)	94.2 (34.6)	99.8 (37.7)	98.1 (36.7)	95.7 (35.4)	87.7 (30.9)	78.4 (25.8)	70.5 (21.4)	99.8 (37.7)
Mean daily maximum °F (°C)	35.6 (2.0)	39.3 (4.1)	48.3 (9.1)	60.8 (16.0)	71.2 (21.8)	79.3 (26.3)	83.4 (28.6)	81.8 (27.7)	74.7 (23.7)	63.1 (17.3)	51.9 (11.1)	39.9 (4.4)	60.9 (16.1)
Daily mean °F (°C)	26.9 (−2.8)	29.7 (−1.3)	37.8 (3.2)	48.9 (9.4)	58.9 (14.9)	67.7 (19.8)	72.1 (22.3)	70.5 (21.4)	63.2 (17.3)	51.6 (10.9)	42.1 (5.6)	31.7 (−0.2)	50.2 (10.1)
Mean daily minimum °F (°C)	18.2 (−7.7)	20.1 (−6.6)	27.2 (−2.7)	36.9 (2.7)	46.6 (8.1)	56.0 (13.3)	60.7 (15.9)	59.2 (15.1)	51.7 (10.9)	40.2 (4.6)	32.3 (0.2)	23.4 (−4.8)	39.5 (4.2)
Record low °F (°C)	−18.2 (−27.9)	−8.2 (−22.3)	0.3 (−17.6)	14.5 (−9.7)	29.4 (−1.4)	36.6 (2.6)	42.4 (5.8)	37.9 (3.3)	30.6 (−0.8)	19.7 (−6.8)	6.1 (−14.4)	−6.6 (−21.4)	−18.2 (−27.9)
Average precipitation inches (mm)	3.43 (87)	2.94 (75)	3.67 (93)	4.13 (105)	4.37 (111)	4.61 (117)	4.49 (114)	4.26 (108)	4.88 (124)	4.62 (117)	3.92 (100)	4.05 (103)	49.37 (1,254)
Average snowfall inches (cm)	12.7 (32)	9.0 (23)	9.4 (24)	2.3 (5.8)	0.0 (0.0)	0.0 (0.0)	0.0 (0.0)	0.0 (0.0)	0.0 (0.0)	0.1 (0.25)	2.4 (6.1)	7.6 (19)	45.2 (115)
Average relative humidity (%)	69.9	64.8	59.9	57.8	62.5	69.1	69.1	72.2	73.3	71.5	69.9	71.1	67.6
Average dew point °F (°C)	18.4 (−7.6)	19.3 (−7.1)	25.1 (−3.8)	34.7 (1.5)	46.1 (7.8)	57.2 (14.0)	61.4 (16.3)	61.1 (16.2)	54.5 (12.5)	42.7 (5.9)	33.0 (0.6)	23.4 (−4.8)	39.8 (4.3)
Source: PRISM

== Transportation ==
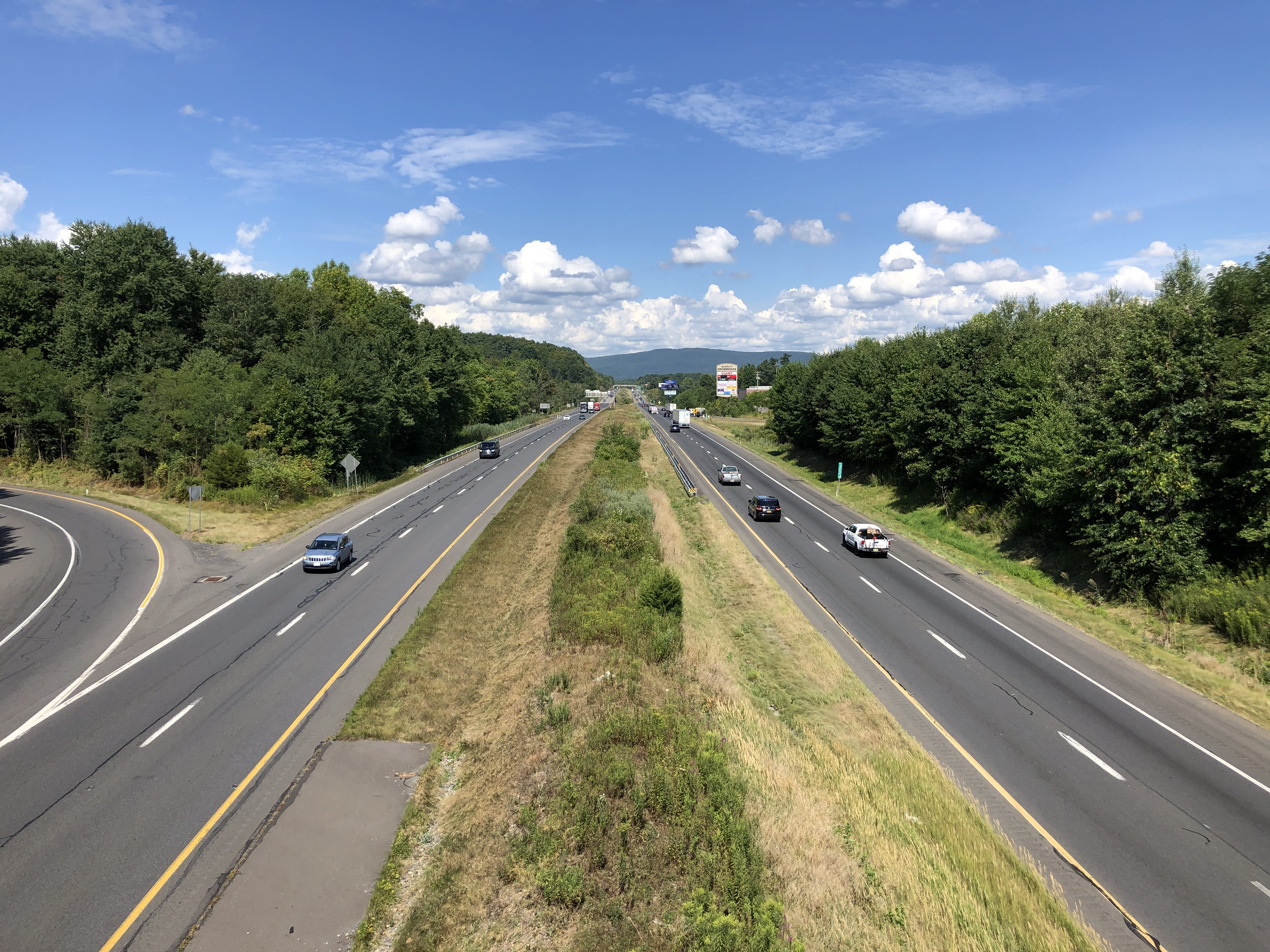
I-80 westbound in Hamilton Township

As of 2013, there were 140.03 miles (225.36 km) of public roads in Hamilton Township, of which 58.93 miles (94.84 km) were maintained by the Pennsylvania Department of Transportation (PennDOT) and 81.10 miles (130.52 km) were maintained by the township.

Multiple highways serve Hamilton Township. The most prominent of these is Interstate 80, which follows the Keystone Shortway along a northwest-southeast alignment across the northern corner of the township. U.S. Route 209 follows a southwest-northeast alignment across the middle of the township. U.S. Route 209 Business starts at US 209 in the western section of the township and heads northeastward just northwest of US 209. Pennsylvania Route 33 follows a north-south alignment through the middle of the township, including a concurrency with US 209. Finally, Pennsylvania Route 611 follows a northwest-southeast alignment across the northern tip of the township, just north of I-80.

=== Tornado ===
On Wednesday, July 29, 2009, an EF2 tornado touched down in Hamilton Township and tore through the landscape for five miles across Hamilton Township and neighboring Stroud Township. Three minor injuries, five homes damaged, and multiple farm buildings were destroyed because of the tornado.

== Ecology ==
According to the A. W. Kuchler U.S. potential natural vegetation types, Hamilton Township would have a dominant vegetation type of Appalachian Oak (104) with a dominant vegetation form of Eastern Hardwood Forest (25). The peak spring bloom typically occurs in late-April and peak fall color usually occurs in mid-October. The plant hardiness zone is 6a with an average annual extreme minimum air temperature of −6.8 °F (−22 °C).

== Notable person ==
- Johann Adam Eyer, fraktur artist
