= Snydersville, Pennsylvania =

Unincorporated community in Pennsylvania, US

- Unincorporated community
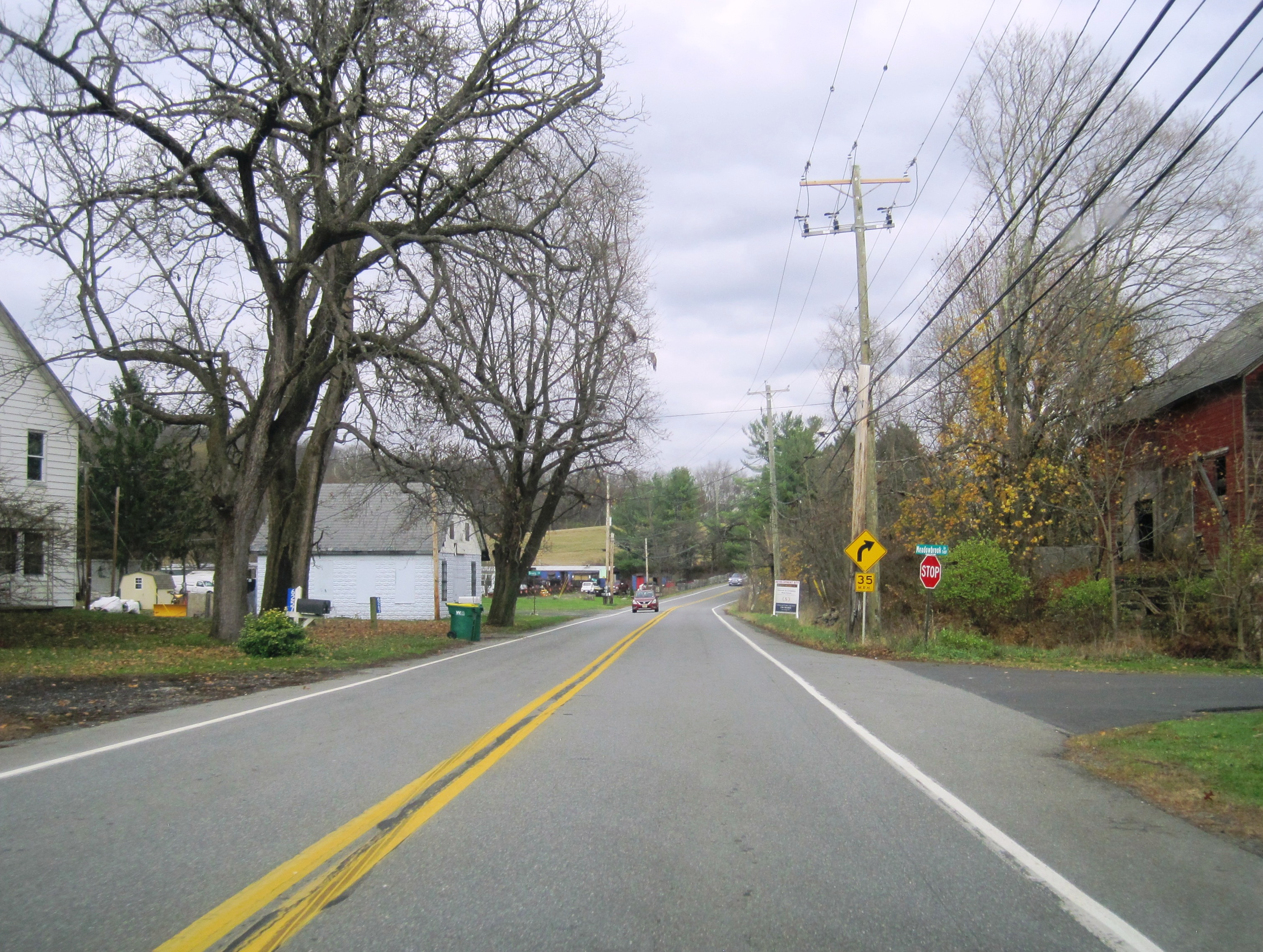
- Along Hamilton East Road

- Location within Pennsylvania Location within the United States
- Coordinates: 40°57′30″N 75°17′30″W
- Country: United States
- State: Pennsylvania
- County: Monroe
- Township: Hamilton
- Elevation: 495 ft (151 m)
- Time zone: UTC-5 (Eastern (EST))
  - Summer (DST): UTC-4 (EDT)
- ZIP code: 18360
- Area codes: 570 and 272
- GNIS feature ID: 1187967

Snydersville is an unincorporated community in Hamilton Township in Monroe County, Pennsylvania, United States. Snydersville is located at the intersection of U.S. Route 209 Business, Rimrock Road, Pensyl Creek Road, and Middle Easton Belmont Pike.
