= Marshall Creek (North Moreau Creek tributary) =

Stream in the American state of Missouri

Coordinates: 38°34′34″N 92°31′37″W

Marshall Creek is a stream in Moniteau County in the U.S. state of Missouri. It is a tributary of North Moreau Creek.

Marshall Creek has the name of the original owner of the site.
