= U.S. Route 209 =

Highway in Pennsylvania and New York

U.S. Route 209
- US 209 highlighted in red, US 209 Bus. in blue

Route information
- Auxiliary route of US 9
- Maintained by PennDOT, NYSDOT, NPS, and JIBC
- Length: 211.74 mi (340.76 km)
- Existed: 1926–present

Major junctions
- South end: PA 147 in Millersburg, PA
- I-81 near Tremont, PA; I-476 Toll / Penna Turnpike NE Extension near Weissport, PA; PA 33 in Snydersville, PA; I-80 in Stroudsburg, PA; US 206 near Milford, PA; US 6 from Milford, PA to Port Jervis, NY; I-84 in Matamoras, PA; Future I-86 / NY 17 in Wurtsboro, NY; US 44 / NY 55 near Kerhonkson, NY; NY 28 in Kingston, NY
- North end: US 9W / NY 199 in Ulster, NY

Location
- Country: United States
- States: Pennsylvania, New York
- Counties: PA: Dauphin, Schuylkill, Carbon, Monroe, Pike; NY: Orange, Sullivan, Ulster

Highway system
- United States Numbered Highway System; List; Special; Divided
- Pennsylvania State Route System; Interstate; US; State; Scenic; Legislative
- New York Highways; Interstate; US; State; Reference; Parkways
← PA 208	PA	→ PA 210
← NY 208	NY	→ NY 210

U.S. Route 209 (US 209) is a 211.74-mile (340.76 km) long U.S. Highway in the states of Pennsylvania and New York. Although the route is a spur of US 9, US 209 never intersects US 9, coming within five miles of the route and making the short connection via New York State Route 199 (NY 199). The southern terminus of the route is at Pennsylvania Route 147 (PA 147) in Millersburg, Pennsylvania. The northern terminus is at US 9W north of Kingston in Ulster, New York, where the road continues east as NY 199.

In Pennsylvania, the highway travels through the length of the Delaware Water Gap National Recreation Area, along the southern part of the Poconos in Monroe and Carbon counties through Jim Thorpe and along parts of the defunct historic Lehigh Canal and Lehigh Valley Railroad then over the divide near Nesquehoning into the Schuylkill Valley along Panther Creek. For part of its route in New York, US 209 runs alongside the defunct Delaware and Hudson Canal, which ran from Port Jervis to Kingston, in each case, following the old land road connections connecting the anthracite coal fields of Northeastern Pennsylvania with the industries and heating customers in New York City.

US 209 is one of the original highways in the 1926 U.S. Highway System plan. The route was initially an intrastate highway contained entirely within Pennsylvania. It began at an intersection with US 11 (now US 22 / US 322) in Clarks Ferry (east of Duncannon) and ended at US 6 in Milford. US 209 was extended northward to US 9W in Kingston, New York, in April 1935 and truncated to Millersburg, Pennsylvania, by 1938. The portion of US 209 in New York north of Port Jervis was previously designated as US 6 from 1926 to 1928, U.S. Route 6N from 1928 to 1933, and New York State Route 279 from 1933 to 1935.

US 209 was realigned onto limited-access highways in two locations along its routing during the 1950s. The first is in the Stroudsburg, Pennsylvania, area. Originally just a bypass of Stroudsburg, a portion of this expressway is now also part of Interstate 80 (I-80) while another portion is now also part of PA 33, with the southern end and the portion between I-80 and PA 33 still just US 209. The second is in the Kingston, New York, area. Serving as a bypass of Kingston that connects to the Kingston- Rhinebeck area Kingston-Rhinecliff Bridge, the highway begins west of Kingston along US 209 south of NY 28 in Ulster and ends north of Kingston, at a cloverleaf interchange with US 9W and NY 199, still in Ulster. This also serves as the current northern terminus of US 209, replacing the old terminus at US 9W in Downtown Kingston. When the expressways were finished, US 209's former routing through downtown Stroudsburg was redesignated as US 209 Business, and NY 28 was extended over US 209’s former alignment through downtown Kingston.

== Route description ==
Lengths
	mi	km
PA	150.60	242.37
NY	61.14	98.40
Total	211.74	340.76

Although signed as a north–south route in both states for its entire length, US 209 actually runs closer to east–west along its southern sections in Pennsylvania, only gently trending northward. Only at Stroudsburg does it begin to turn more to the north as it begins to follow the Delaware River. In New York it runs almost due northeast for its entire length.

Much of the highway in both states is a two-lane road, running through narrow mountain valleys, but there are expressway portions. In Pennsylvania, one near Stroudsburg connects concurrencies with PA 33 and Interstate 80 (I-80); in New York, the north end is an expressway.

=== Millersburg to Jim Thorpe ===
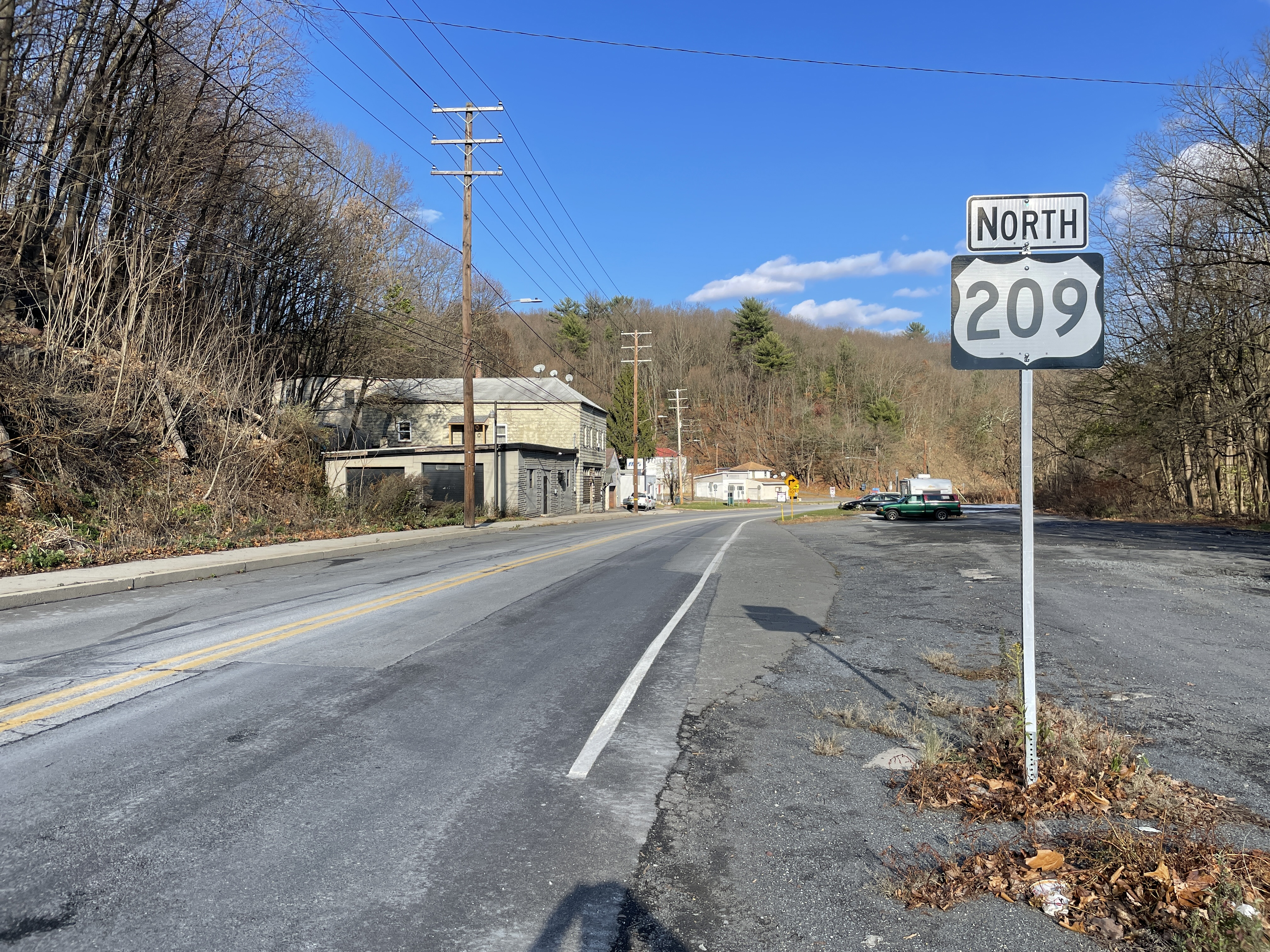
US 209 northbound in Pottsville

From the southern terminus at PA 147 in Millersburg, US 209 runs alongside the Berry Mountain ridge through the Lykens Valley in northern Dauphin County, a rural valley that is home to an Amish community. In the Lykens Valley, the route passes through Elizabethville before continuing east through Lykens and Williamstown. The road continues into Schuylkill County, finally climbing a valley headwall near Tower City to intersect I-81 on the other side, then continues on to Tremont. Beyond that, the generally straight route starts to curve a little more frequently into Pottsville, after which it follows the upper Schuylkill River as it heads into lightly populated areas in the Coal Region such as Port Carbon, Cumbola, New Philadelphia, and Middleport on its way to Tamaqua.

Several miles beyond, US 209 crosses into Carbon County at Lansford, where it nestles between Nesquehoning, Sharp, and Pisgah mountains until it finally turns slightly to the north just before Nesquehoning. From there it follows the Nesquehoning Creek valley down to the Lehigh River, which US 209 follows southeasterly through Jim Thorpe to Lehighton. At the south end of the town, it crosses the river and resumes its north-trending eastward course, which brings it to an interchange at I-476 (Pennsylvania Turnpike Northeast Extension).

=== Jim Thorpe to Matamoras ===
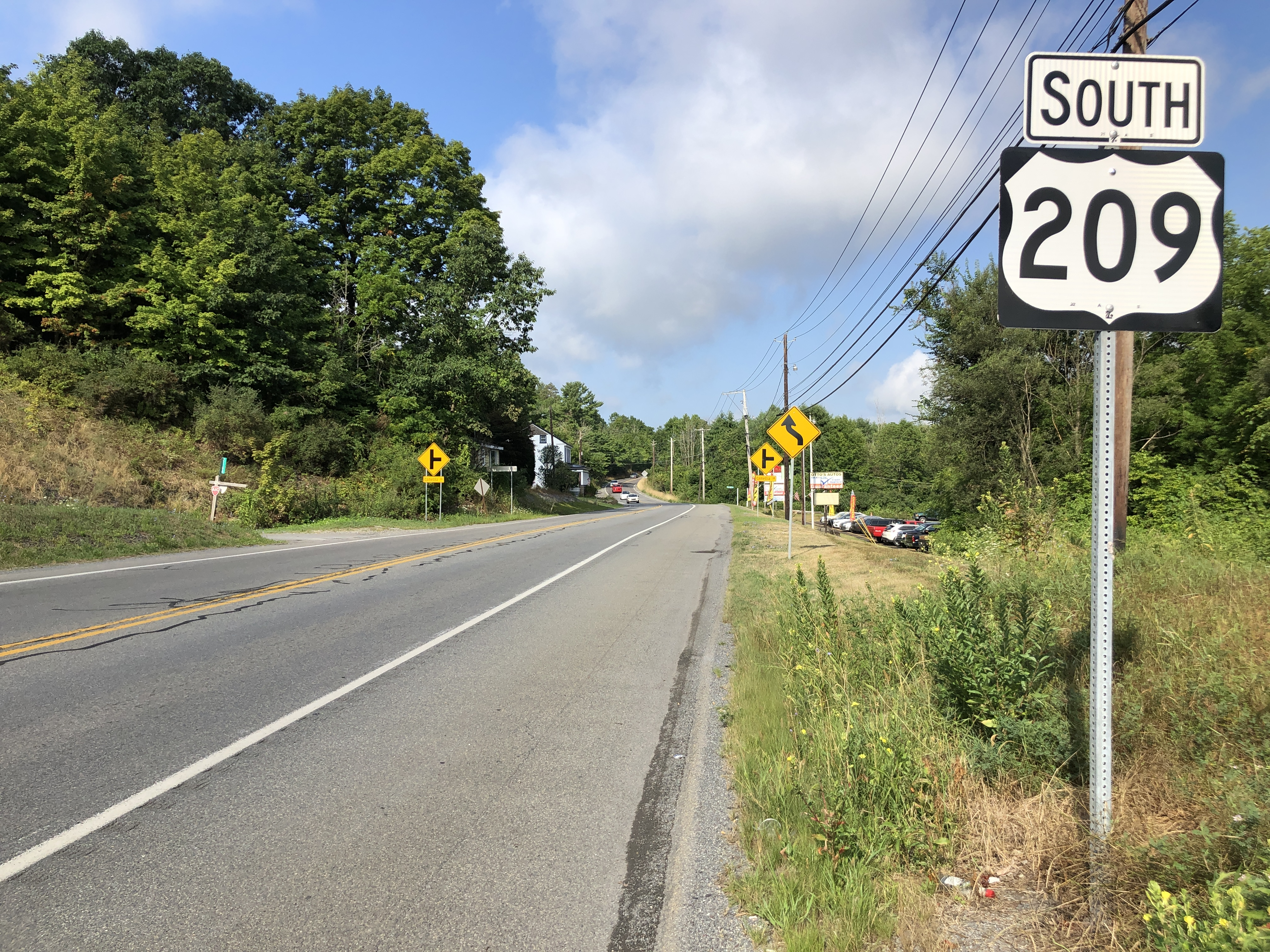
US 209 southbound in Chestnuthill Township

Once again, there are no major settlements along US 209 as it heads through isolated valleys, this time with more agricultural use evident, into Monroe County and eventually to its absorption into PA 33. US 209 Bus. leaves the road at Sciota for travelers wishing to bypass the expressway.

At the next exit, US 209 takes its own short branch of expressway several miles to I-80 just outside Stroudsburg. It stays with the Interstate through the borough and neighboring East Stroudsburg from exits 304 to 309, one of the last exits before the state line.

From this point on, US 209 runs much more northerly, reconnecting with US 209 Bus. after several miles and taking its more firmly northeast bearing to eventually run along the Delaware River shortly after entering Pike County, its last in the state. This 20-mile (32 km) segment provides access to New Jersey via toll bridges at Dingman's Bridge and Milford Crossing, where US 206 comes to its northern end. Just beyond the latter bridge, the road reaches Milford, where US 6 joins it.

The two highways eventually start to run alongside I-84, and development picks up as they approach Matamoras, the easternmost town in the state. After crossing under the interstate at its final Pennsylvania interchange, they form the borough's main street along Pennsylvania Avenue and cross into New York via the Mid-Delaware Bridge.

=== Mid-Delaware Bridge to Kingston ===
US 6 and US 209 remain concurrent as they enter Port Jervis, but after less than a mile US 209 strikes out to the northeast again on its own. After leaving the city, it enters the valley between the Shawangunk Ridge and the Catskill Plateau to its west, following the Neversink River until crossing it just prior to the hamlet of Cuddebackville. The scenery is rural and the settlements along the road are few, with only one blinker between Port Jervis and the Sullivan County line. In Wurtsboro, shortly after the NY 17 (future I-86) interchange, the route reaches a traffic light at Sullivan Street.

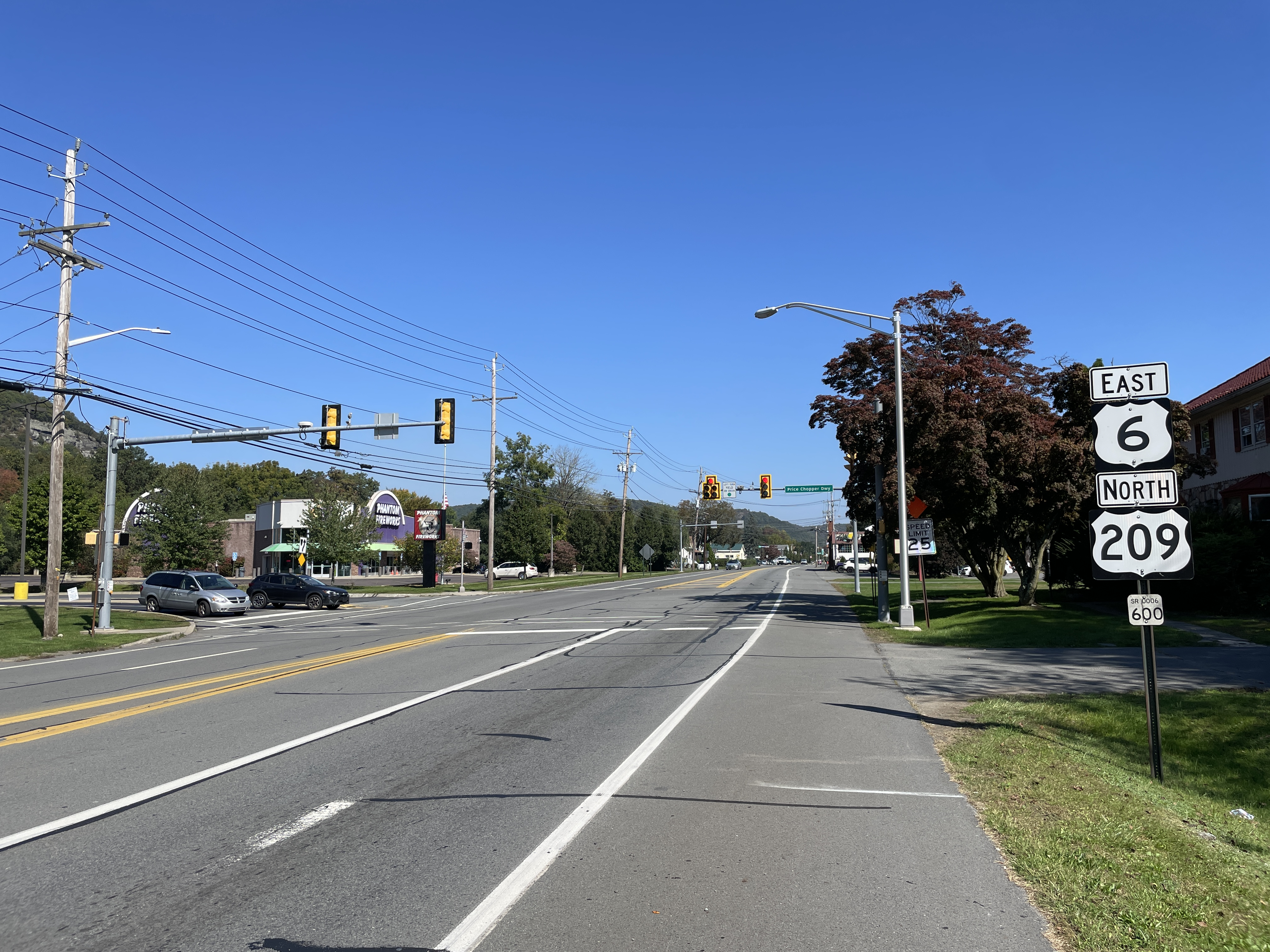
US 6 eastbound/US 209 northbound past I-84 in Matamoras

The road follows along some of the old Delaware and Hudson Canal, a National Historic Landmark and passes Wurtsboro Airport, out of the county into Ulster County, and eventually reaches another village, more bustling Ellenville. Just past it, in the hamlet of Napanoch, it picks up its first concurrency partner since US 6, NY 55. These two routes run together as Rondout Creek crosses and eventually runs alongside the road.

At another small hamlet, Kerhonkson, NY 55 leaves to join US 44 at the latter's western terminus. US 44 and NY 55 offer access ultimately to Poughkeepsie, 30 miles (48 km) to the east. The valley begins to widen as another road, NY 213, joins for a mile before leaving at a blinker in downtown Stone Ridge. To the north, the road eventually becomes a two-lane expressway, then a four-lane freeway just short of NY 28 just west of Kingston, just inside the Catskill Park.

After turning to the east again, US 209 crosses the New York State Thruway (I-87) but does not have an exit. The eastbound highway remains a freeway to the Kingston–Rhinecliff Bridge. US 209, however, does not make it that far, becoming NY 199 where it crosses over US 9W.

== History ==
US 209 follows a straight, northeasterly course for almost its entire length within New York. This corridor, first used for long-distance transport by the Old Mine Road in colonial times and then the historic Delaware and Hudson Canal in the early 19th century, keeps it in the scenic valley between the Catskill Plateau and the Shawangunk Ridge. Except for the freeway section at the northern end—the remnant of a much more ambitious plan to make the entire roadway one—US 209 remains a two-lane rural road for much of its length in the state. The small communities along it are separated by great distances, and the road is a vital access link.

=== Pennsylvania ===
Before the advent of the U.S. Highway System, the alignment of US 209 in Pennsylvania carried several designations. By 1920, the Gap Way was signed to run from Philadelphia to East Stroudsburg, where it met the modern alignment of U.S. 209, running along that road to the New York border. On May 31, 1911, as part of the Sproul Road Bill, the highway was assigned several Legislative Route numbers, each corresponding to a specific section of what would become US 209. The segment of the route from Duncannon north to Millersburg was part of Legislative Route 1. From Millersburg east to Pottsville, the highway was referenced as LR 199. Between Pottsville and Lehighton, the road carried LR 162. The section connecting Lehighton to Stroudsburg was given LR 164. Lastly, the segment from Stroudsburg to Milford was designated LR 167. The future US 6 / US 209 concurrency between Milford and the state line carried LR 8.

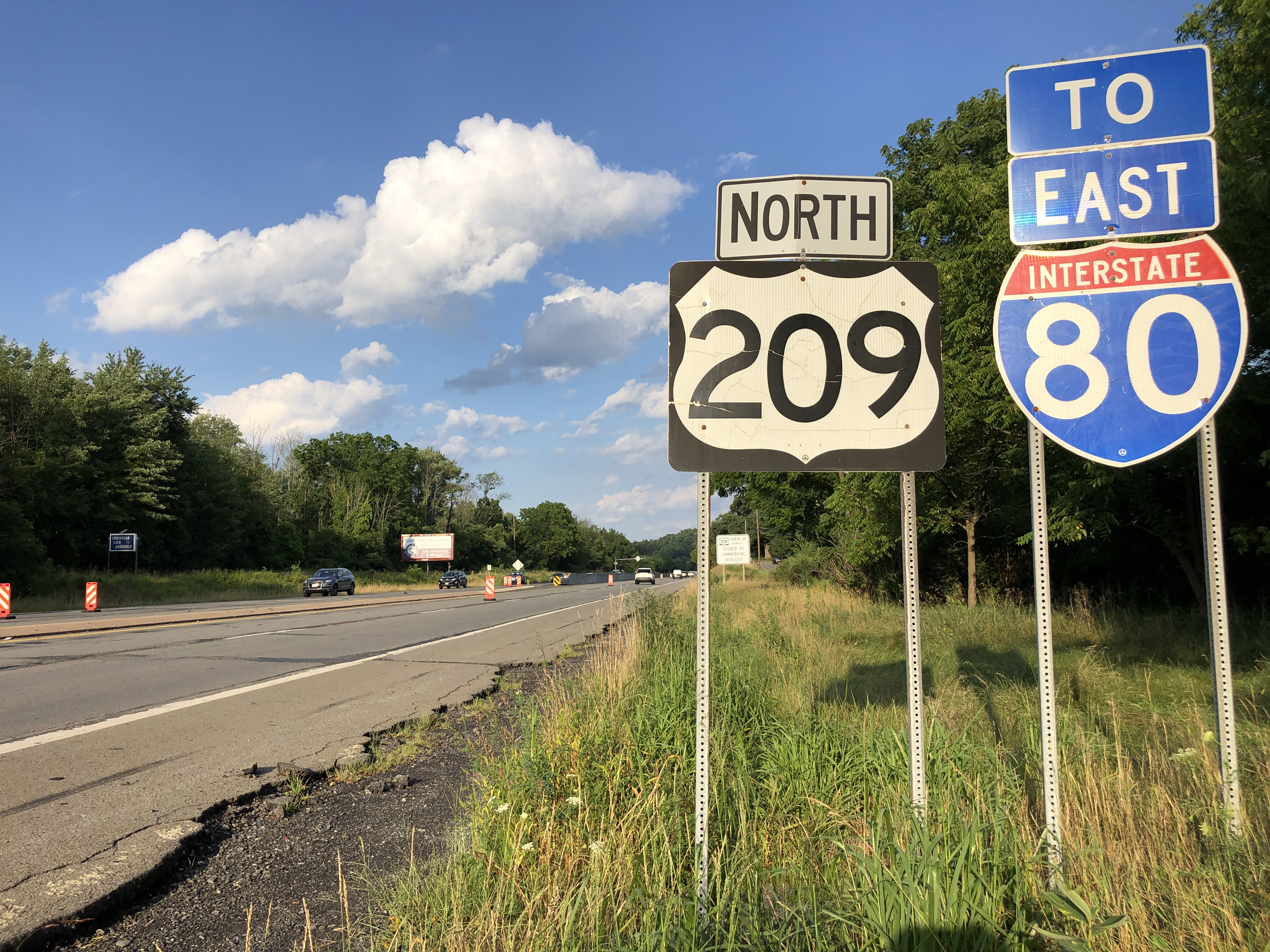
The US 209 expressway northbound in Stroud Township

The Pennsylvania portion of US 209 dates back to the formation of the U.S. Highway System in 1926. At the time, US 209 began at US 11 (today US 22 / US 322) east of Duncannon and ended at US 6 in Milford. Northeast of Milford, US 6 continued alone to Matamoras and across the Delaware River into New York. Between Duncannon and Millersburg, US 209 was routed along the eastern banks of the Susquehanna River on what is now PA 147. In the Poconos, US 209 ran along the modern US 209 Business. US 209 was extended northward to Kingston, New York, c. 1935, creating an overlap with US 6 from Milford to the state line. Meanwhile, US 209 was truncated by 1938 to end in Millersburg while the former routing of US 209 from Clarks Ferry to Millersburg became part of an extended US 15.

In the summer of 1962, the routing of US 209 was altered in the vicinity of Stroudsburg. At what is now the interchange between US 209 and US 209 Business, US 209 broke from its previous alignment and continued east to a newly built freeway (modern PA 33). PA 115, which was concurrent with US 209 from Brodheadsville to the freeway, continued south on the expressway while US 209 proceeded north. At the present-day split between PA 33 and US 209, US 209 followed the east fork, leaving the west fork with no designation. US 209 then followed its current alignment around Stroudsburg, running concurrent to I-80 from exit 46A to exit 52 (now exits 304 and 309, respectively). It left I-80 at exit 52 and rejoined its previous alignment northeast of the borough. The old alignment through the borough was redesignated as US 209 Business. Part of US 209's new alignment east of Stroudsburg was previously part of PA 402. By 1972, PA 115 was truncated to Brodheadsville and the length of the north–south freeway near Stroudsburg was designated PA 33, overlapping US 209 for roughly two miles.

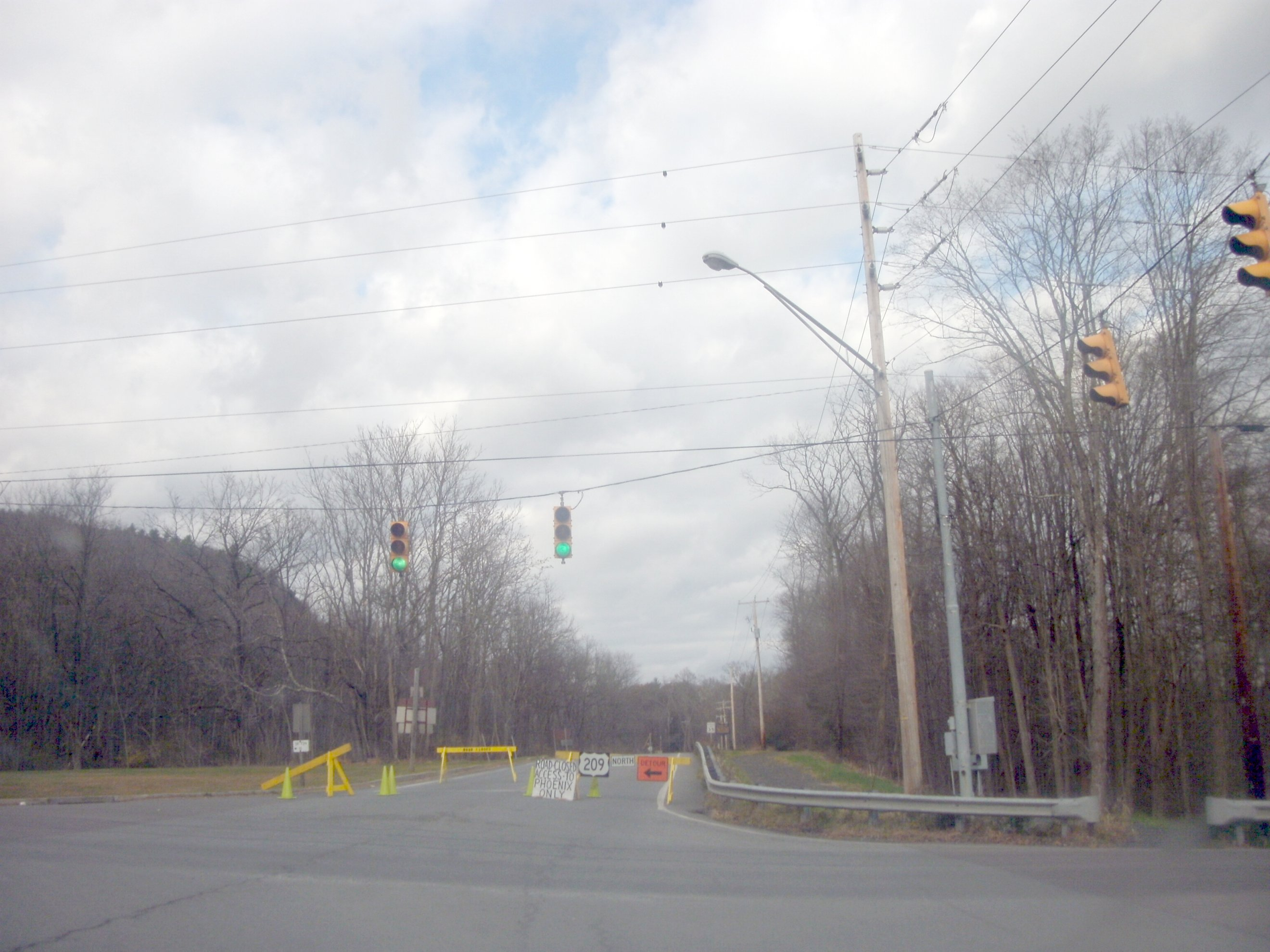
Signage of US 209 closed at PA 739 in Dingmans Ferry in November 2011

The National Park Service began the rule of no trucks along the Delaware Water Gap National Recreation Area on US 209 in August 1983. The bill was passed by President Ronald Reagan on the 1st of the month. It was projected to begin in April 1983, but the bill was delayed 180 days. In 1995, commercial vehicles began running in the area again, as long as they pay fee at two toll booths, one in Bushkill and one just south of downtown Milford. Prices began in 1995 and charged from $3.00 for 2-axles to $18.00 for 5 or more axles.

In 2011, after rains from Hurricane Irene in August and Tropical Storm Lee in September, the grounds under the highway were saturated and after a landslide occurred on October 21, the National Park Service closed US 209 between PA 739 in Dingmans Ferry and the North Contact Station just south of the Milford–Montague Toll Bridge. Due to the approach of winter, the National Park Service can only get engineering done with outside contractors. The detour set in place takes motorists across the Dingmans Ferry Bridge and Old Mine Road or via PA 739 and State Route 2001 (Milford Road) to access Milford. Delaware Township has asked the Pennsylvania Department of Transportation (PennDOT) to keep PA 739 near US 209 clear of snow, due to the importance of the intersection. US 209, however, was slated to be closed through the winter and likely into summer of 2012. The project was then slated to be finished in fall 2012, a delay from the original spring/summer repair.

The project was completed on November 21, 2012 and US 209 was re-opened to traffic. With the construction, new guard rails were instituted and the road was stabilized and repaved. The reconstruction of the McDade Recreational Trail was slated for completion in spring 2013.

There are plans to construct two roundabouts along US 209 in Brodheadsville - one at Pleasant Valley Lane and the other at PA 115 - in order to alleviate traffic congestion. Construction on the roundabouts is projected to cost $11.5 million. In February 2021, PennDOT opened construction bids for the proposed roundabouts.

==== Marshalls Creek Bypass ====
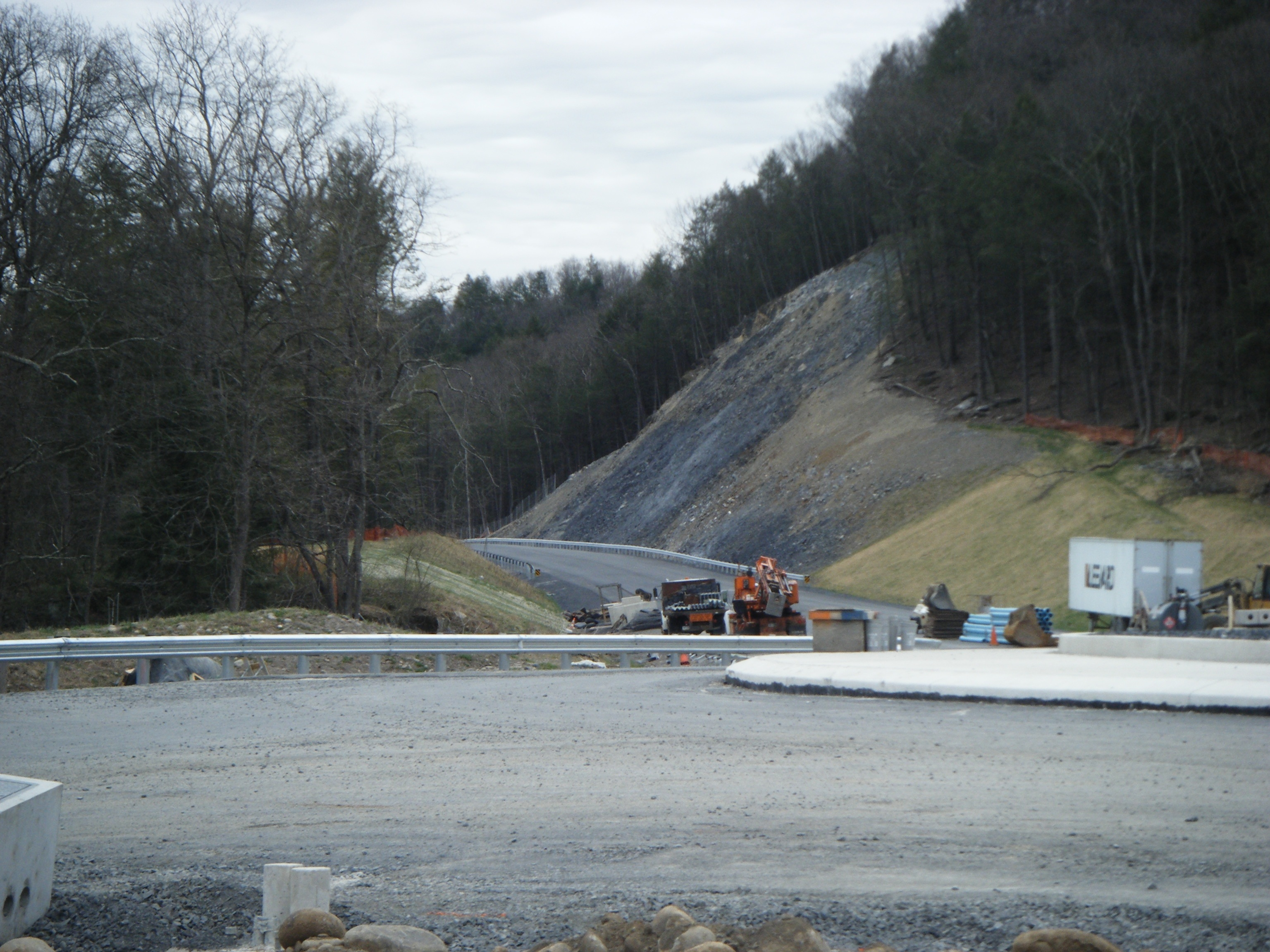
Marshalls Creek Bypass under construction in 2012

The junction where US 209 intersects with PA 402 in the hamlet of Marshalls Creek within Middle Smithfield Township was plagued with traffic for several decades. In 1990, studies were launched to investigate construction of a new bypass of the hamlet. The new bypass was approved in October 2004 and was originally projected to cost $70 million (2004 USD). The bypass was designed to be 3.5 miles (5.6 km) in length and have an asphalt surface. Nine new signalized intersections were proposed for the bypass construction: seven on US 209, one on PA 402, and one on River Road. The first of three phases of construction was completed in mid-2007 and cost $14.2 million. Phase two, which was projected to start in fall of 2007, was originally projected to cost $17 million for constructing a new 400-space park and ride lot on US 209 and relocating Oak Grove Drive and Mount Nebo Roads, was completed in 2009 at only a cost of $6.3 million.

The third stage of construction of the bypass was originally projected to be completed in late 2012, but opened on June 11, 2012 with a ribbon cutting ceremony. With the opening, US 209 was realigned onto the new bypass, US 209 Business was extended from Seven Bridges Road to the new US 209 interchange east of Marshalls Creek and old US 209 along Seven Bridges Road was renumbered to State Route 1019 (SR 1019). Upon opening, Seven Bridges Road was closed for two to three months for bridge replacement, while the junction with US 209 Business was reconstructed. That portion of the project was slated for completion in early 2013, with a final stage three cost of $18.2 million.

=== New York ===
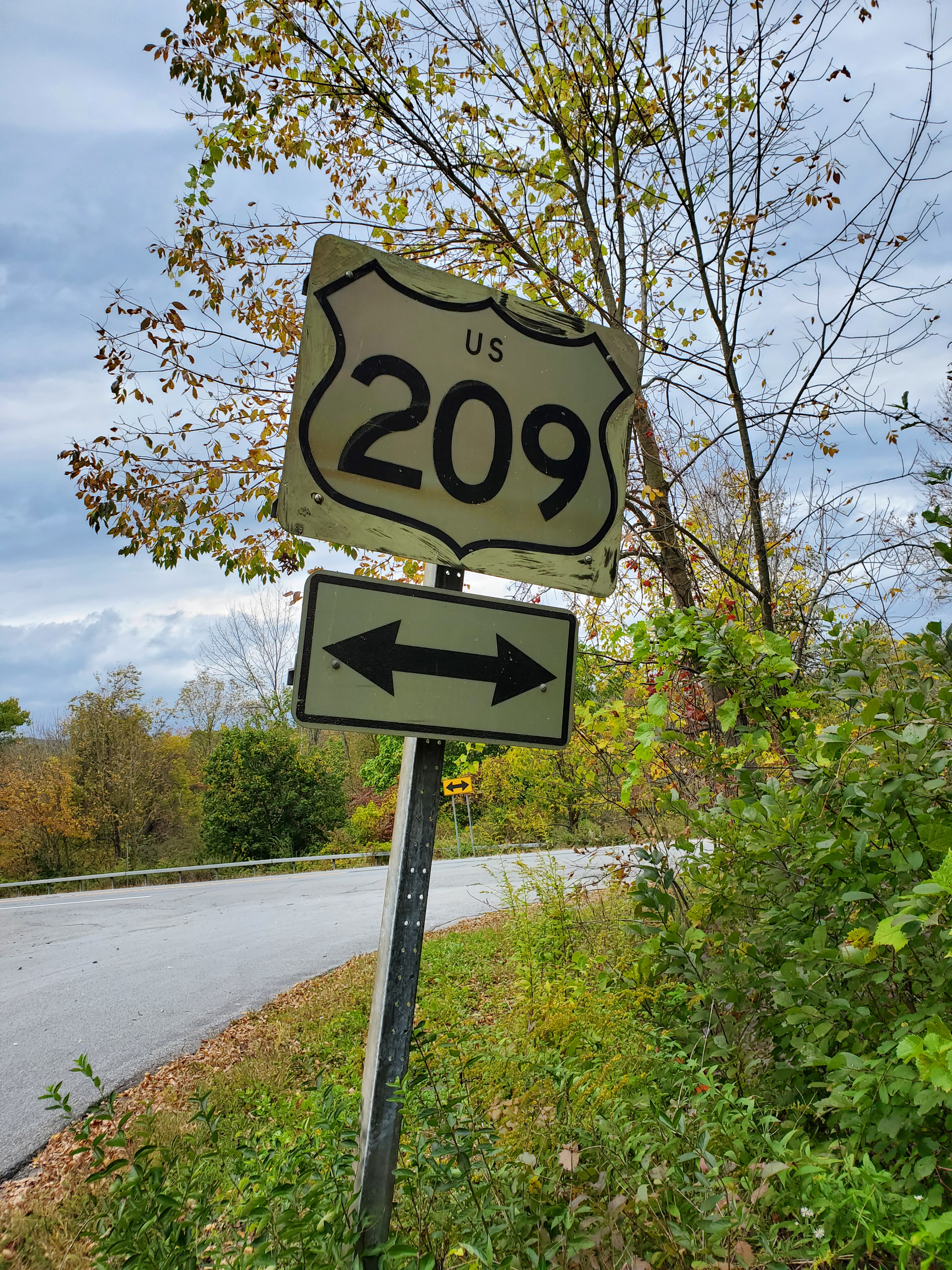
1958 specification US 209 shield in Sullivan County

Before the designation of the New York highway system, what is now US 209 was part of the Gap Way, which ran from the Pennsylvania border at Port Jervis to Kingston. In the mid-1920s, a highway connecting PA 7 at Port Jervis to NY 10 (now US 9W) in Kingston via Wurtsboro and Napanoch was designated as NY 50. In 1927, the first official route log published by AASHO included the NY 50 alignment as part of US 6. A year later, AASHO modified the definition of US 6, placing the route along a new alignment farther south in the state. In turn, the Port Jervis–Kingston highway was redesignated US 6N. The designation remained in place until 1933, when it was removed. The former US 6N was then redesignated as NY 279. The road changed designations for the final time in April 1935, rejoining the U.S. Highway System and becoming part of an extended US 209.

The portion of US 209 south of Kingston has remained virtually unchanged, with the exception of local realignments. Two such reroutings were in the vicinity of the hamlets of Spring Glen and Napanoch, where US 209 was initially routed on Phillipsport Road and Main Street, respectively. US 209 was realigned to bypass Napanoch c. 1962, by which time construction had begun on a bypass of Spring Glen. It was opened to traffic by 1964.

US 209 initially entered Kingston on what is now Old Route 209 and Hurley Avenue. Within the city, the route followed North Front Street, and Clinton, Albany, and Ulster Avenues to a terminus at East Chester Street (US 9W). At the time, US 209 had an overlap with NY 32 from Broadway to Flatbush Avenue. Construction began in the early 1960s on a new four-lane freeway bypassing downtown Kingston to the northwest. The highway began at US 209 south of Hurley and ended at an interchange with US 9W north of Kingston and south of Lake Katrine, where it met the western terminus of NY 199. The new route was completed by 1964 and became a realignment of US 209.

== Future ==
Due to increasing suburbanization and a rapidly increasing population in the Stroudsburg area, I-80 is to be widened to three lanes in each direction from its current two between I-380 (exit 293) in Pocono Pines and the Delaware Water Gap Bridge (New Jersey state line), and part of this project includes the entirety of US 209’s concurrency with I-80. The project had a completion date of 2023, has been approved by PennDOT and USDOT and is in the final design phase. The project will widen I-80 to three lanes in each direction between exit 298 and exit 308, as well as reconstruct all interchanges included in this part of the project. This section of road was built in the 1920s and is one of the oldest stretches of the US highway in the US, starting out as a simple bypass of Stroudsburg for US 209 before becoming part of I-80. It has one of the highest accident rates in Pennsylvania due to major issues such as most entrances not having acceleration lanes, multiple overpasses that are structurally deficient, and shoulders that are as narrow as one tenth the required length for Interstate highways. Exits 304 and 305 on the westbound side are close together that they are only a quarter of the length apart required between exits, according to Interstate standards. Exits 303, 304, and 306 all do not provide full access. US 209 is a designated route, so all lanes had to be open during construction. In addition, this stretch of highway has large local usage, with 100% of drivers that enter at exit 307 getting off at either exit 306, exit 305 or exit 304, some of the current connections must be preserved to prevent local opposition.

The details of the project include widening I-80 to three lanes in each direction between exit 298 and exit 308 and rebuilding exits 298, 299, 303, 306, 307, and 308 to create full access between US 209, I-80 and PA 611. Exits 307 and 308 will both be reconstructed.

== Major intersections ==
State	County	Location	mi	km	Exit	Destinations	Notes
Pennsylvania	Dauphin	Millersburg	0.00	0.00		PA 147 (Market Street) – Halifax, Harrisburg, Sunbury	Southern terminus
Pennsylvania	Dauphin	Millersburg	0.45	0.72		PA 25 east (Johnson Street) – Berrysburg	Western terminus of PA 25
Pennsylvania	Dauphin	Elizabethville	8.06	12.97		PA 225 (Market Street)	
Pennsylvania	Schuylkill	Tower City	22.87	36.81		PA 325 west (10th Street) – Clarks Ferry	Eastern terminus of PA 325
Pennsylvania	Schuylkill	Frailey Township	29.04	46.74		I-81 (American Legion Memorial Highway) – Hazleton, Harrisburg	Exit 107 on I-81
Pennsylvania	Schuylkill	Tremont	31.76	51.11		PA 125 north (Spring Street) – Shamokin	South end of PA 125 concurrency
Pennsylvania	Schuylkill	Tremont	32.05	51.58		PA 125 south (Swatara Avenue) to I-81 south – Pine Grove	North end of PA 125 concurrency
Pennsylvania	Schuylkill	Newtown	34.53	55.57		PA 25 west (West Pine Street) to I-81 – Hegins	Eastern terminus of PA 25
Pennsylvania	Schuylkill	Norwegian Township	40.66	65.44		PA 901 west (Minersville–Pottsville Highway) – Minersville	South end of PA 901 concurrency
Pennsylvania	Schuylkill	Pottsville	41.52	66.82		PA 901 east (Gordon Nagle Trail) – Cressona	North end of PA 901 concurrency
Pennsylvania	Schuylkill	Pottsville	44.33	71.34		PA 61 (Claude A. Lord Boulevard) – St. Clair, Reading	
Pennsylvania	Schuylkill	Tamaqua	59.90	96.40		PA 309 (North Railroad Street/Mauch Chunk Street/Center Street) – Hazleton, Allentown	
Pennsylvania	Carbon	Lansford	65.20	104.93		PA 902 east (Spring Garden Street) – Summit Hill	Western terminus of PA 902
Pennsylvania	Carbon	Nesquehoning	69.68	112.14		PA 54 west (Stock Street) – Mahanoy City	Eastern terminus of PA 54
Pennsylvania	Carbon	Nesquehoning	71.27	114.70		PA 93 north (Hunter Street) – Hazleton	Southern terminus of PA 93
Pennsylvania	Carbon	Jim Thorpe	74.21	119.43		PA 903 north (River Street) – Lake Harmony, Blakeslee	Southern terminus of PA 903
Pennsylvania	Carbon	Lehighton	78.47	126.29		PA 443 west (Blakeslee Boulevard) – Tamaqua	Eastern terminus of PA 443
Pennsylvania	Carbon	Weissport	78.79	126.80		PA 248 east (Parryville Bypass) – Allentown, Easton	Western terminus of PA 248
Pennsylvania	Carbon	Franklin Township	80.54	129.62		I-476 Toll / Penna Turnpike NE Extension	Exit 74 (Mahoning Valley) on I-476 / Penna Turnpike NE Extension; former PA 9
Pennsylvania	Monroe	Kresgeville	90.98	146.42		PA 534 west (Scenic Drive) – Jonas, Hickory Run State Park	Eastern terminus of PA 534
Pennsylvania	Monroe	Brodheadsville	96.42	155.17		PA 115 north – Blakeslee	Southern terminus of PA 115
Pennsylvania	Monroe	Brodheadsville	96.69	155.61		PA 715 north – McMichaels, Reeders, Tannersville	Southern terminus of PA 715
Pennsylvania	Monroe	Hamilton Township	100.00	160.93	Southern end of limited-access section		
Pennsylvania	Monroe	Hamilton Township	100.96	162.48		US 209 Bus. north (Hamilton East Road) – Sciota	Southern terminus of US 209 Business
Pennsylvania	Monroe	Hamilton Township	101.88	163.96		PA 33 south – Bethlehem, Easton	South end of PA 33 concurrency
Pennsylvania	Monroe	Hamilton Township	103.55	166.65		Snydersville	Access via Manor Drive
Pennsylvania	Monroe	Hamilton Township	104.27	167.81		PA 33 north to I-80 west – Bartonsville, Hazleton	Northbound exit and southbound entrance; north end of PA 33 concurrency
Pennsylvania	Monroe	Stroud Township	106.3	171.1		Shafers Schoolhouse Road	Right-in/right-out connections only
Pennsylvania	Monroe	Arlington Heights	108.43	174.50	304	I-80 west – Hazleton	Southbound exit and northbound entrance; south end of I-80 concurrency
Pennsylvania	Monroe	Stroudsburg	108.80	175.10	305	US 209 Bus. (Main Street)	
Pennsylvania	Monroe	Stroudsburg	109.44	176.13	306	Dreher Avenue	Westbound exit and eastbound entrance
Pennsylvania	Monroe	Stroudsburg	109.90	176.87	307	PA 611 (Park Avenue) to PA 191	Eastbound exit and entrance
Pennsylvania	Monroe	Stroudsburg	110.40	177.67	307	PA 191 (Broad Street) to PA 611	Westbound exit and entrance
Pennsylvania	Monroe	East Stroudsburg	111.11	178.81	308	East Stroudsburg	Access via Prospect Street; access to East Stroudsburg University
Pennsylvania	Monroe	Smithfield Township	112.43	180.94	309	I-80 east – Delaware Water Gap	North end of I-80 concurrency
Pennsylvania	Monroe	Smithfield Township	112.43	180.94	Northern end of limited-access section		
Pennsylvania	Monroe	Smithfield Township	112.70	181.37		PA 447 north (Independence Road) – Analomink, Canadensis	Southern terminus of PA 447
Pennsylvania	Monroe	Marshalls Creek	116.50	187.49		US 209 Bus. south (Milford Road) to PA 402 – Marshalls Creek	Northern terminus of US 209 Bus.
Pennsylvania	Pike	Dingmans Ferry	135.67	218.34		PA 739 (Bethany and Dingmans Choice Turnpike) – Layton, Childs Park, Dingmans Ferry, Lords Valley	Southern terminus of PA 739
Pennsylvania	Pike	Dingman Township	143.07	230.25		US 206 south (Milford–Montague Toll Bridge) – New Jersey, New York	Northern terminus of US 206
Pennsylvania	Pike	Milford	143.91	231.60		US 6 west (Harford Street) to I-84 – Hawley, Scranton	South end of US 6 concurrency
Pennsylvania	Pike	Westfall Township	149.28	240.24		I-84 – Scranton, Port Jervis	Exit 53 on I-84
Delaware River			150.60 0.00	242.37 0.00	Mid-Delaware Bridge; Pennsylvania–New York state line		
New York	Orange	Port Jervis	0.30	0.48		Port Jervis Station	Interchange
New York	Orange	Port Jervis	0.61	0.98		NY 42 north / NY 97 north – Monticello, Barryville	Southern terminus of NY 42 / NY 97
New York	Orange	Port Jervis	0.86	1.38		US 6 east to I-84 east – Middletown, Beacon	North end of US 6 concurrency
New York	Orange	Town of Deerpark	8.91	14.34		NY 211 east – Otisville, Middletown	Western terminus of NY 211; hamlet of Cuddebackville
New York	Sullivan	Mamakating	17.60	28.32		Future I-86 / NY 17 (Quickway) – New York City, Monticello	Exit 113 on Future I-86 / NY 17
New York	Ulster	Ellenville	30.80	49.57		NY 52 – Woodbourne, Walker Valley, Pine Bush	NY 52 intersects at both Canal and Center streets
New York	Ulster	Wawarsing	32.54	52.37		NY 55 west – Grahamsville	South end of NY 55 concurrency; hamlet of Napanoch
New York	Ulster	Wawarsing	36.92	59.42		US 44 east / NY 55 east – New Paltz, Poughkeepsie	North end of NY 55 concurrency; western terminus of US 44; hamlet of Kerhonkson
New York	Ulster	Marbletown	47.59	76.59		NY 213 east – Rosendale, High Falls	South end of NY 213 concurrency
New York	Ulster	Marbletown	48.43	77.94		NY 213 west – Olivebridge	North end of NY 213 concurrency; hamlet of Stone Ridge
New York	Ulster	Hurley			Southern end of limited-access section		
New York	Ulster	Ulster	57.51	92.55		NY 28 – Pine Hill, Kingston, Woodstock	Access to Kingston Hospital
New York	Ulster	Ulster	59.81	96.25		CR 31 (Sawkill Road)	
New York	Ulster	Ulster	60.57	97.48		CR 157 (Enterprise Drive)	
New York	Ulster	Ulster	61.14	98.40		US 9W – Kingston, Saugerties	
New York	Ulster	Ulster	61.14	98.40		NY 199 east – Rhinecliff Bridge, Rhinebeck, Red Hook	Continuation east
1.000 mi = 1.609 km; 1.000 km = 0.621 mi: Concurrency terminus; Electronic toll collection; Incomplete access

== Special routes ==
US 209 has four special bannered routes, all of which are located in Pennsylvania.

=== Truck routes ===
==== Pottsville–Tamaqua truck route ====
U.S. Route 209 Truck
- Location: Pottsville–Tamaqua, Pennsylvania

U.S. Route 209 Truck (US 209 Truck) is a truck route of US 209 that bypasses a weight-restricted bridge over the Wabash Creek in Tamaqua, Pennsylvania, on which trucks over 28 tons are prohibited. The route follows PA 61, I-81, PA 54, and PA 309.

Major intersections

The entire route is in Schuylkill County.

Location	mi	km	Exit	Destinations	Notes
Pottsville				US 209 / PA 61 south – Reading, Harrisburg, Tamaqua, Tremont	Southern terminus
Blythe Township				Schuylkill Mall Road	Interchange
Ryan Township				PA 61 north / I-81 south – Frackville, Harrisburg	Northern terminus of PA 61 concurrency; southern terminus of I-81 concurrency; no exit number northbound
Mahanoy Township				I-81 north / PA 54 west – Hazleton, Mahanoy City	Northern terminus of I-81 concurrency; southern terminus of PA 54 concurrency; no exit number southbound
Hometown				PA 54 east / PA 309 north to I-81 – Jim Thorpe, Hazleton	Northern terminus of PA 54 concurrency; southern terminus of PA 309 concurrency
Tamaqua				US 209 south / PA 309 – Allentown, Coaldale, Lansford, Pottsville	Northern terminus
1.000 mi = 1.609 km; 1.000 km = 0.621 mi: Concurrency terminus

==== Kresgeville–Brodheadsville truck route ====
U.S. Route 209 Truck
- Location: Kresgeville–Brodheadsville, Pennsylvania

U.S. Route 209 Truck (US 209 Truck) is a truck route of US 209 that bypasses a weight-restricted bridge over the Middle Creek in Kresgeville, Pennsylvania, on which trucks over 25 tons and combination loads over 38 tons are prohibited. The route follows PA 534, PA 903, and PA 115.

Major intersections

County	Location	mi	km	Destinations	Notes
Monroe	Kresgeville			US 209 – Stroudsburg, Lehighton PA 534 begins	Southern terminus of PA 534
Carbon	Albrightsville			PA 534 west / PA 903 south – Hickory Run State Park, Jim Thorpe	Northern terminus of PA 534 concurrency; southern terminus of PA 903 concurrency
Monroe	Lake Harmony			PA 115 north to I-80 – Blakeslee, Wilkes-Barre PA 903 ends	Northern terminus of PA 903; southern terminus of PA 115 concurrency
Monroe	Brodheadsville			US 209 to PA 715 – Stroudsburg, Easton, Lehighton PA 115 ends	Roundabout; Southern terminus of PA 115
1.000 mi = 1.609 km; 1.000 km = 0.621 mi: Concurrency terminus

==== East Stroudsburg–Marshalls Creek truck route ====
U.S. Route 209 Truck
- Location: East Stroudsburg–Marshalls Creek, Pennsylvania

U.S. Route 209 Truck (US 209 Truck) is a truck route of US 209 that bypasses a weight-restricted bridge over the Marshall Creek in Smithfield Township, Pennsylvania, on which trucks over 35 tons and combination loads over 40 tons are prohibited. The route follows PA 447 and US 209 Bus.

Major intersections

The entire route is in Monroe County.

Location	mi	km	Destinations	Notes
East Stroudsburg	0.00	0.00	US 209 to I-80 – Marshalls Creek, Milford, Delaware Water Gap, Stroudsburg	Southern terminus of PA 447
East Stroudsburg			US 209 Bus. south (Courtland Street)	Southern terminus of US 209 Business concurrency
East Stroudsburg			PA 447 north (Paradise Trail)	Northern terminus of PA 447 concurrency
Marshalls Creek			PA 402 north – Resica Falls, Hawley	Southern terminus of PA 402
Marshalls Creek			US 209 – Milford, Port Jervis, Delaware Water Gap	Northern terminus of US 209 Business
1.000 mi = 1.609 km; 1.000 km = 0.621 mi: Concurrency terminus

=== Business routes ===
==== Stroudsburg business route ====
U.S. Route 209 Business
- Location: Stroudsburg, Pennsylvania
- Existed: June 1, 1962–present

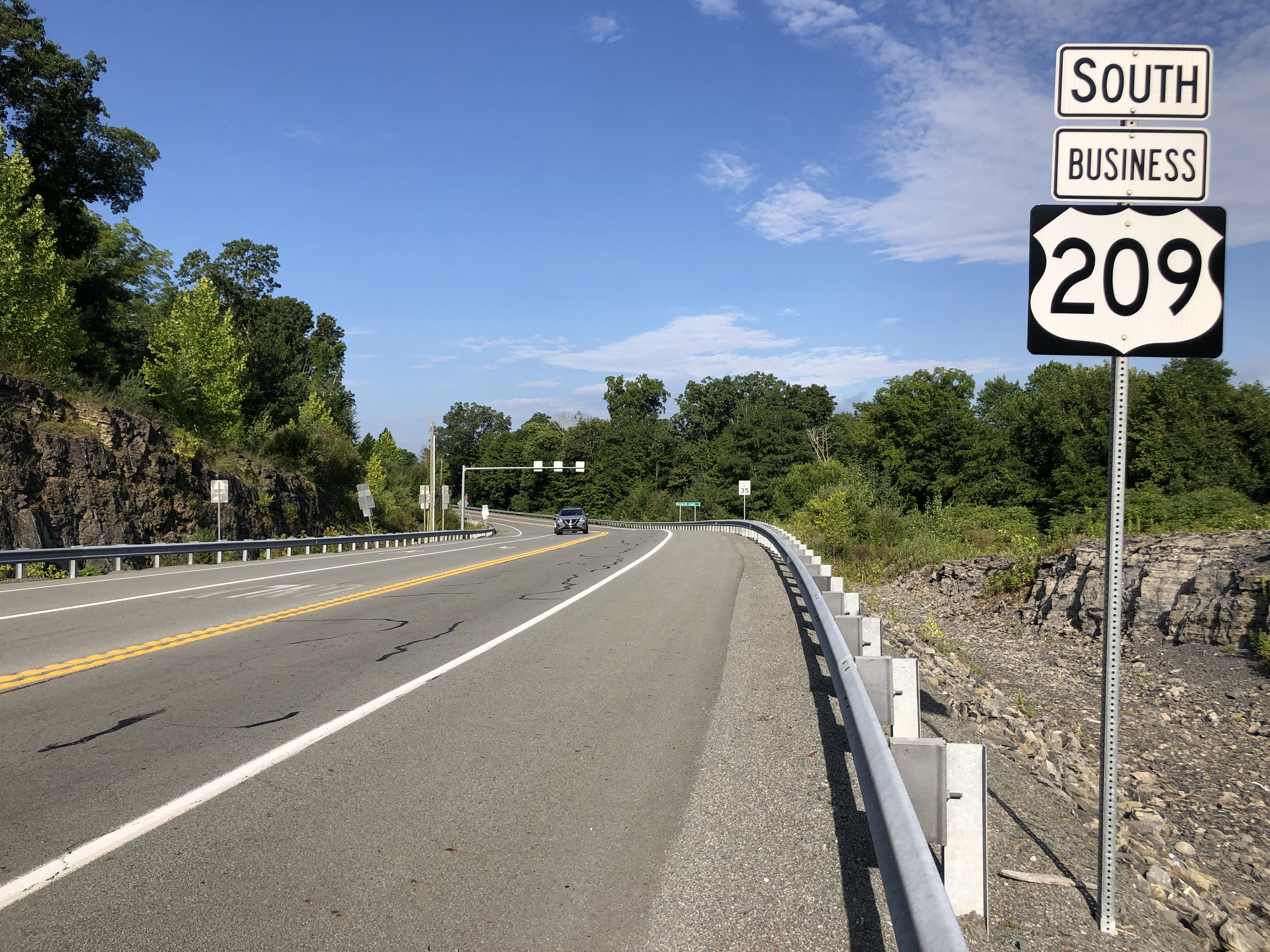
US 209 Bus. southbound past US 209 in Marshalls Creek

U.S. Route 209 Business (US 209 Bus.) is a business route of US 209 in eastern Pennsylvania. The southern terminus of the route is at US 209 in the Hamilton Township hamlet of Sciota. The northern terminus is at US 209 in the Smithfield Township hamlet of Marshalls Creek.

US 209 Bus. follows the pre-1962 alignment of US 209 before it was moved onto I-80 between Marshalls Creek and present-day I-80 exit 305 in Stroudsburg, allowing US 209 Bus. to occupy the former alignment of US 209. In 1963, the Pennsylvania Highways Department recommended that US 209 Bus. be designated on the bypassed section of US 209 between Stroudsburg and Sciota. US 209 Bus. was extended southward to its current southern terminus in 1964 when US 209 was relocated onto a bypass paralleling its former alignment between Stroudsburg and Sciota. In 1974, the portion of this bypass from the mile-long connecting freeway to what was PA 611 up to exit 305 became designated as Interstate 80—the Interstate and US 209 run concurrently today between Stroudsburg and East Stroudsburg.

Major intersections

The entire route is in Monroe County.

Location	mi	km	Destinations	Notes
Sciota	0.0	0.0	US 209 to PA 33 – Stroudsburg, Lehighton	Interchange; road continues south as South Hamilton Road/State Route 3019
Snydersville	3.9	6.3	PA 33 north – Bartonsville	Interchange, southbound exit and northbound entrance
Snydersville	5.4	8.7	To US 209 south	Right in/right out via Shafers Schoolhouse Road
Stroudsburg	7.2	11.6	I-80 / US 209 – Hazleton, Delaware Water Gap	Exit 305 (I-80 / US 209)
Stroudsburg	8.0	12.9	PA 611 north (9th Street)	South end of PA 611 concurrency
Stroudsburg	8.3	13.4	PA 611 south (7th Street) to I-80	North end of PA 611 concurrency
Stroudsburg	8.5	13.7	PA 191 south (5th Street) to I-80	South end of PA 191 concurrency
Stroudsburg	8.6	13.8	PA 191 north (4th Street)	North end of PA 191 concurrency
East Stroudsburg	10.7	17.2	PA 447 south (6th Street) – Delaware Water Gap	South end of PA 447 concurrency
East Stroudsburg	10.8	17.4	PA 447 north (Paradise Trail) – Analomink, Cresco, Canadensis	North end of PA 447 concurrency
Marshalls Creek	14.2	22.9	PA 402 north (Resica Falls Road) – Resica Falls, Hawley	Southern terminus of PA 402
Marshalls Creek	14.7	23.7	US 209 (Milford Road/Marshalls Creek Bypass) – Milford, Port Jervis, Delaware Water Gap	
1.000 mi = 1.609 km; 1.000 km = 0.621 mi: Concurrency terminus; Incomplete access

== See also ==
- List of county routes in Ulster County, New York
