= Marshalls Creek (Pennsylvania) =

Coordinates: 40°59′50″N 75°08′28″W

Marshalls Creek is a 13.3-mile-long (21.4 km) tributary of the Brodhead Creek in the Pocono Mountains in Northeastern Pennsylvania in the United States.

Marshalls Creek was named after Edward Marshall, a pioneer citizen. Variant names were "Marshall Creek" and "Marshall's Creek".

== See also ==
- List of rivers of Pennsylvania
