= Tannersville =

Tannersville may refer to the following places in the United States:

- Tannersville, New York
- Tannersville, Pennsylvania
- Tavennersville, West Virginia
