= Pennsylvania Route 314 =

State highway in Monroe County, Pennsylvania, US

Pennsylvania Route 314

Route information
- Maintained by PennDOT
- Length: 7.265 mi (11.692 km)
- Existed: 1964–present

Major junctions
- West end: PA 940 in Pocono Summit
- PA 611 in Swiftwater
- East end: PA 715 in Pocono Township

Location
- Country: United States
- State: Pennsylvania
- Counties: Monroe

Highway system
- Pennsylvania State Route System; Interstate; US; State; Scenic; Legislative
← PA 313	→ PA 315

Pennsylvania Route 314 (PA 314) is an 7.26-mile (11.68 km) state highway located in Monroe County, Pennsylvania. The western terminus is at PA 940 in Pocono Summit. The eastern terminus is at PA 715 in Pocono Township. The route is a two-lane undivided road that passes through forested areas of the Pocono Mountains. In Swiftwater, PA 314 has a short concurrency with PA 611. The road between Pocono Summit and U.S. Route 611 (US 611) in Swiftwater was designated as PA 15 in 1927 and became PA 115 a year later. PA 940 replaced the PA 115 designation on this stretch in 1935. PA 314 was designated to its current alignment in 1964, replacing this section of PA 940 which was rerouted to the north.

== Route description ==
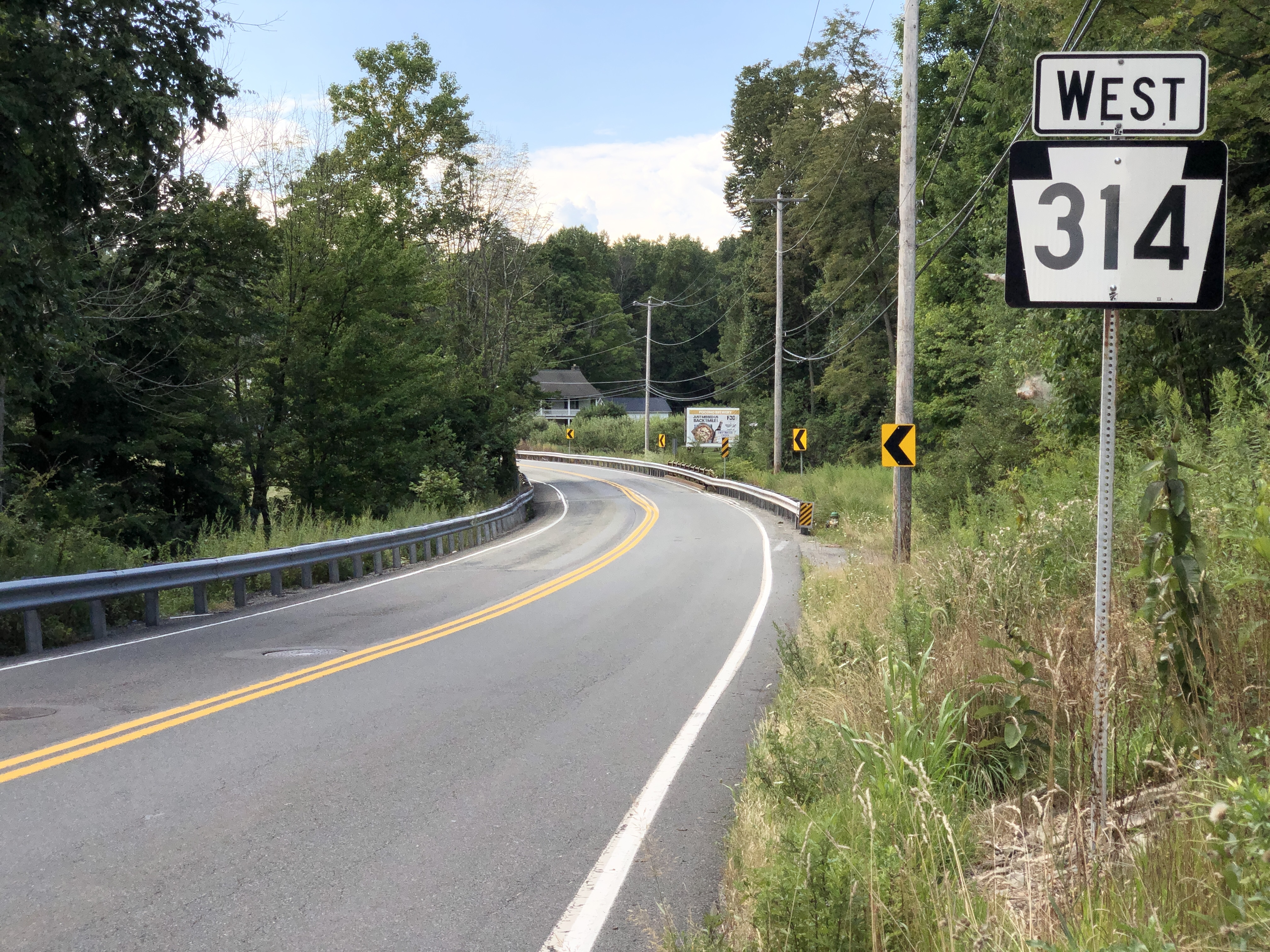
PA 314 westbound past PA 611 in Swiftwater

PA 314 begins at an interchange with PA 940 and Woodland Drive, which reaches old PA 940, in the community of Pocono Summit in Tobyhanna Township. Known as Manor Drive, PA 314 heads south through heavily forested areas, turning to the east as it intersects Kalahari Boulevard, which leads southwest to Kalahari Resorts and Conventions Poconos. The route crosses into Pocono Township and continues eastward through the wooded residential community of Pocono Manor. The first intersection is with SR 4007, also known as Fairview Avenue. The route passes through more dense forests before reaching an intersection with PA 611. At this point, PA 314 merges southeast onto PA 611 the two roads become concurrent for a short distance on a four-lane divided highway. PA 314 leaves PA 611 by heading eastward on a two-lane undivided road and entering Swiftwater. Now known as Lower Swiftwater Road, PA 314 heads into Paradise Township and makes continuous turns through wooded areas with some homes. The route turns southeast onto Club House Road, with Lower Swiftwater Road continuing eastward as SR 1004. PA 314 crosses back into Pocono Township and enters Meisertown, where it ends at PA 715.

== History ==
When routes were first legislated in Pennsylvania in 1911, what is now PA 314 west of Swiftwater was designated as part of Legislative Route 171. The segment of road between Pocono Summit and US 611/PA 2 in Swiftwater became the easternmost part of PA 15 in 1927; a year later the route was renumbered to PA 115. The section of PA 115 between PA 615 in Pocono Summit and US 611 in Swiftwater was a paved road, while the road east of Swiftwater was an unnumbered, unpaved road. In 1935, PA 940 replaced the PA 115 designation between Pocono Summit and Swiftwater. The unnumbered road east of Swiftwater was paved in the 1930s. PA 314 was designated to its current alignment between PA 940 and PA 715 in 1964, replacing the PA 940 designation between Pocono Summit and Swiftwater. PA 940 was rerouted at Pocono Summit to head east through Mount Pocono to Paradise Valley.

== Major intersections ==
The entire route is in Monroe County.

Location	mi	km	Destinations	Notes
Tobyhanna Township	0.000	0.000	PA 940 (Pocono Summit Road) to I-380 – Blakeslee, Mount Pocono	Interchange; western terminus
Pocono Township	3.282	5.282	PA 611 north – Mount Pocono	West end of PA 611 overlap
Pocono Township	3.502	5.636	PA 611 south – Tannersville	East end of PA 611 overlap
Pocono Township	7.265	11.692	PA 715 – Tannersville, Henryville	Eastern terminus
1.000 mi = 1.609 km; 1.000 km = 0.621 mi: Concurrency terminus
