= Pennsylvania Route 715 =

State highway in Monroe County, Pennsylvania, US

Pennsylvania Route 715

Route information
- Maintained by PennDOT
- Length: 17.656 mi (28.415 km)
- Existed: April 8, 1963–present

Major junctions
- South end: US 209 in Chestnuthill Township
- I-80 in Pocono Township; PA 611 in Pocono Township; PA 314 in Pocono Township
- North end: PA 191 in Paradise Township

Location
- Country: United States
- State: Pennsylvania
- Counties: Monroe

Highway system
- Pennsylvania State Route System; Interstate; US; State; Scenic; Legislative
← PA 713	→ PA 718

Pennsylvania Route 715 (PA 715) is a 17.7-mile-long (28.5 km) north–south state route located entirely in Monroe County, Pennsylvania. Its southern terminus is at U.S. Route 209 (US 209) in the Chestnuthill Township hamlet of Brodheadsville. The northern terminus is at PA 191 in the Paradise Township hamlet of Henryville. PA 715 also intersects Interstate 80 (I-80) in Tannersville at Exit 299. The route is a two-lane undivided road running through forested areas of the Pocono Mountains. The road was paved between 1930 and the 1940s. PA 715 was designated to its present alignment in 1963.

== Route description ==
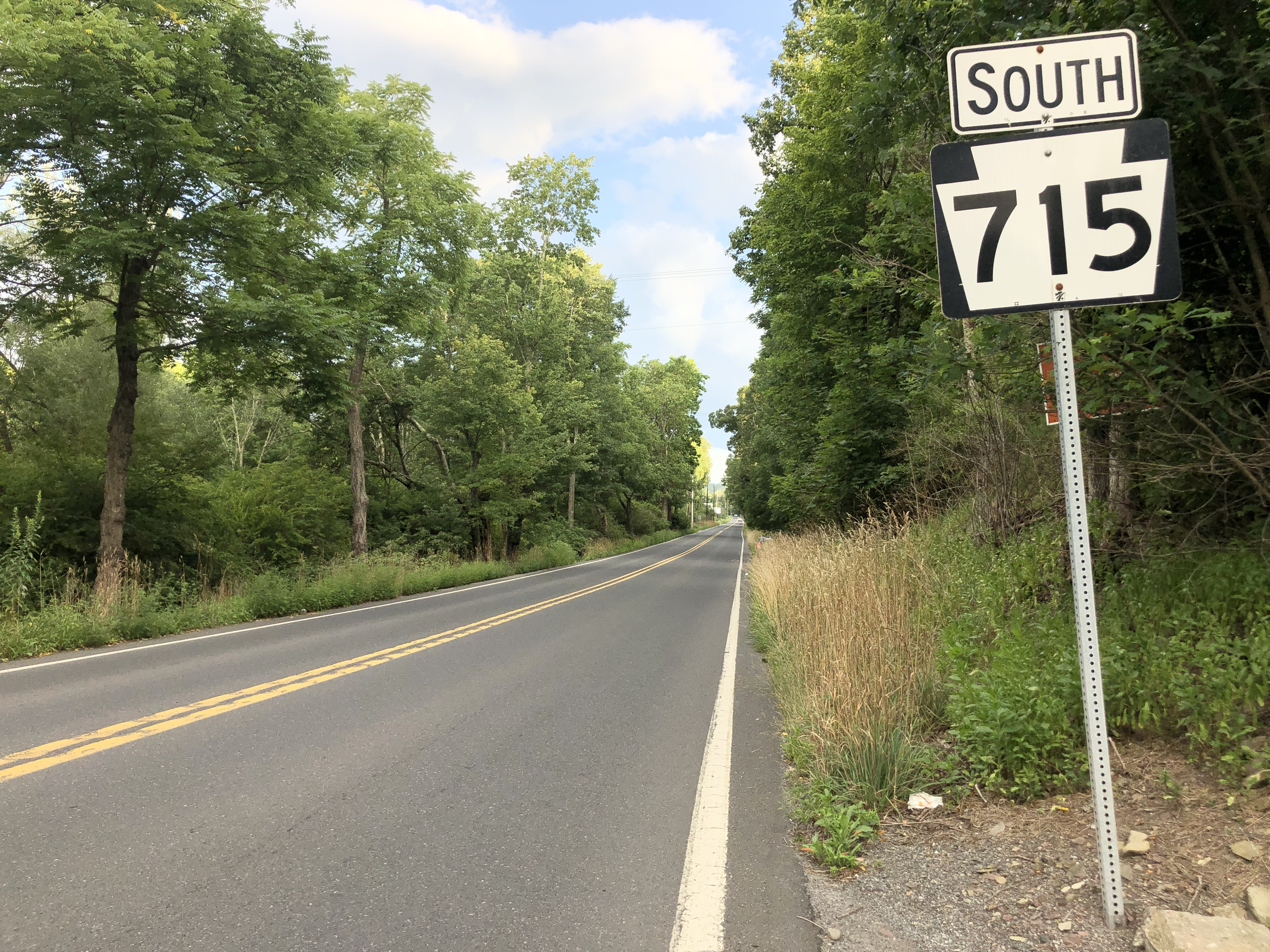
PA 715 southbound in McMichaels

PA 715 begins at an intersection with US 209 in Brodheadsville in Chestnuthill Township, heading north on a two-lane undivided road. The road passes a mix of rural homes and fields before crossing McMichael Creek and running parallel to the east of the creek. PA 715 continues into forested areas with a few housing developments. Farther north, the route passes a mix of farms, woods, and homes, crossing the creek again. The road comes to McMichaels and makes a sharp turn to the east, heading across McMichael Creek a third time. PA 715 enters Jackson Township and heads into wooded areas of residential subdivisions as it turns northeast and passes Grubers Lake and Trout Lake. After the latter, the road heads more to the north and passes through Reeders. The route heads northeast into Pocono Township and runs through woods with some commercial development, passing to the southeast of the Northampton Community College Monroe Campus before reaching to an interchange with I-80.

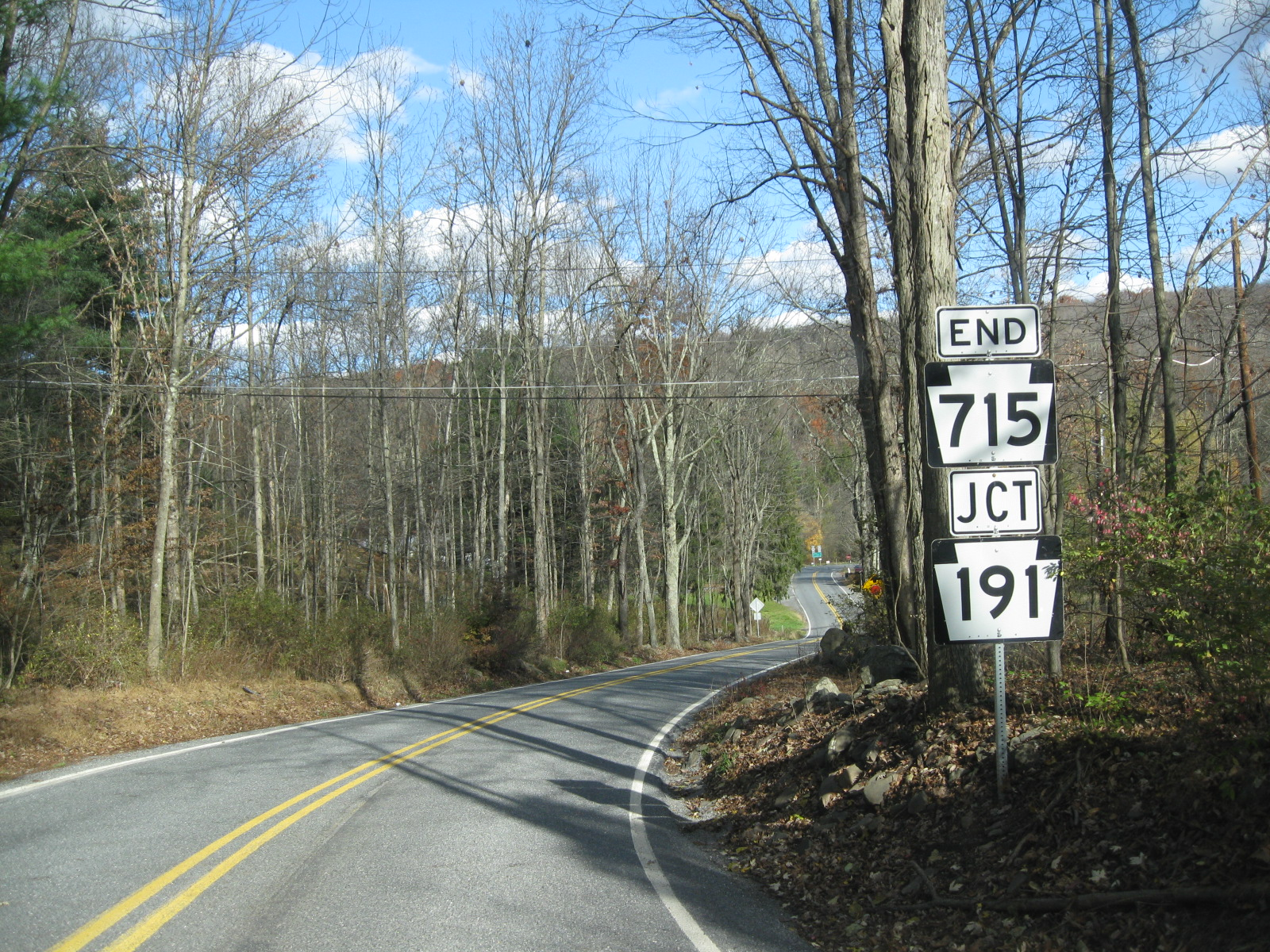
PA 715 at its northern terminus with PA 191 in Paradise Township

From here, PA 715 intersects Sullivan Trail, which provides access to the Pocono Premium Outlets, Camelback Mountain Resort, Big Pocono State Park, and westbound I-80. After this, the route crosses Pocono Creek and forms a short wrong-way concurrency with PA 611 in Tannersville. Past PA 611, the highway continues northeast through dense forests with occasional areas of wooded housing developments. In Meisertown, PA 715 intersects the eastern terminus of PA 314. Following this intersection, the route continues into Paradise Township and passes through more forests before ending at PA 191 in Henryville.

== History ==
When routes were first legislated in Pennsylvania in 1911, what is now PA 715 was not given a number. By 1930, the present-day route was an unpaved road between US 209 in Brodheadsville and McMichaels and a paved road between McMichaels and US 611 in Tannersville. The road between US 611 in Tannersville and PA 90 (now PA 191) in Henryville existed as a paved road by 1940. In the 1940s, the road between Brodheadsville and McMichaels was paved. PA 715 was designated on April 8, 1963 to follow its current alignment between US 209 in Brodheadsville and PA 191 in Henryville. PA 715 was signed in order to provide a route number at the I-80 interchange in Tannersville.

== Major intersections ==
The entire route is in Monroe County.

Location	mi	km	Destinations	Notes
Chestnuthill Township	0.000	0.000	US 209 – Stroudsburg, Lehighton	Village of Brodheadsville; southern terminus
Pocono Township	11.820– 11.848	19.022– 19.068	I-80 – Stroudsburg, Hazleton	Village of Tannersville; exit 299 (I-80); access to I-80 west via Sullivan Trail
Pocono Township	12.243	19.703	PA 611 north – Mount Pocono	South end of PA 611 overlap
Pocono Township	12.312	19.814	PA 611 south – Bartonsville	North end of PA 611 overlap
Pocono Township	15.872	25.544	PA 314 west (Club House Road) – Swiftwater	Village of Meisertown; eastern terminus of PA 314
Paradise Township	17.656	28.415	PA 191 – Cresco, Mount Pocono, Stroudsburg	Village of Henryville; northern terminus
1.000 mi = 1.609 km; 1.000 km = 0.621 mi: Concurrency terminus

== PA 715 Truck ==
Pennsylvania Route 715 Truck
- Location: Tannersville

Pennsylvania Route 715 Truck is a truck route of PA 715 that bypasses a weight-restricted bridge over the Pocono Creek in Pocono Township, on which trucks over 21 tons and combination loads over 25 tons are prohibited. The northbound truck route follows Sullivan Trail, I-80 west, and PA 611 south. The southbound truck route follows PA 611 south, PA 33 south, and I-80 west. It was signed in 2013.
