= 1948 United States presidential election in Kentucky =

- November 2, 1948

All 11 Kentucky votes to the Electoral College

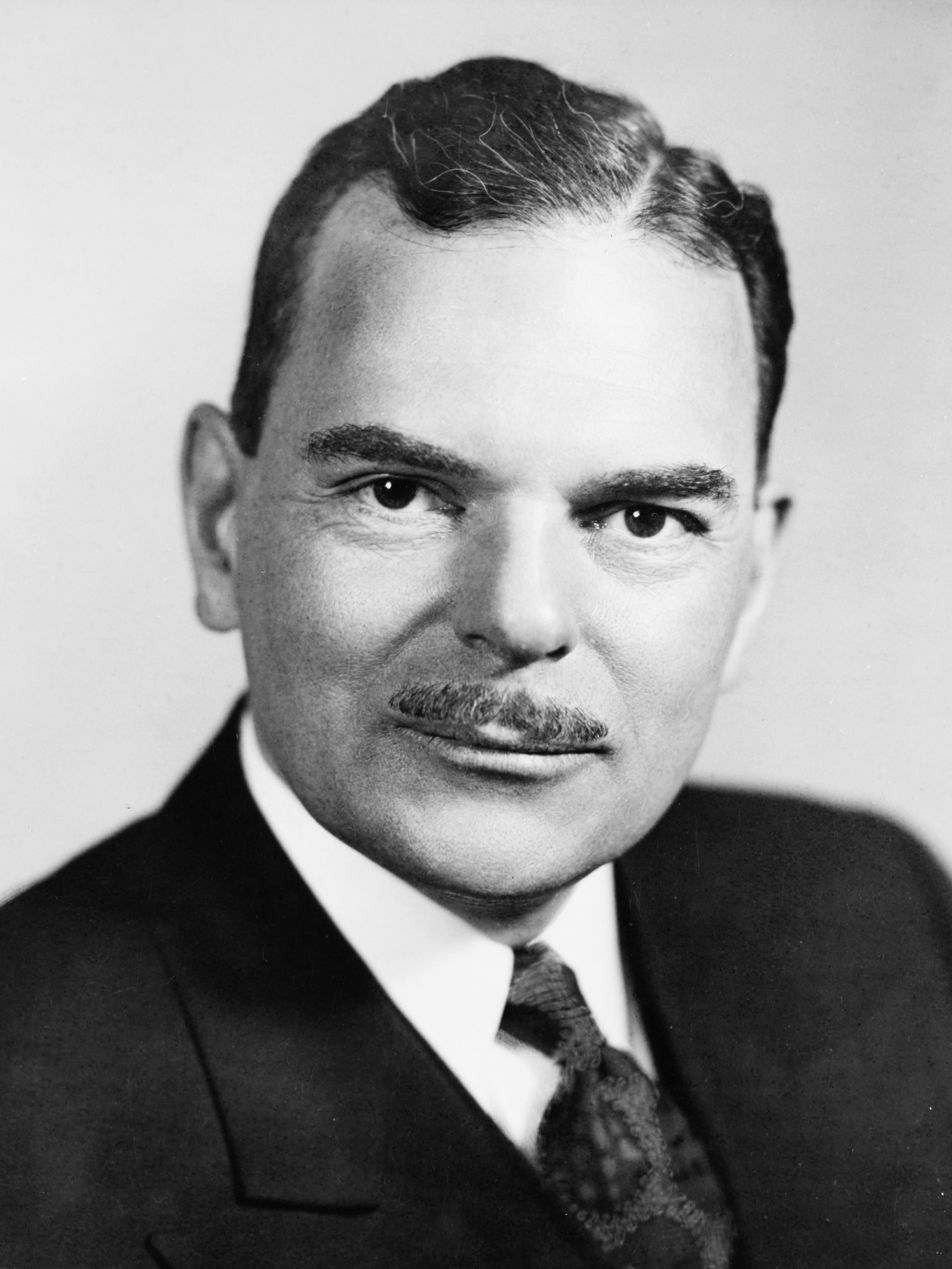
Nominee	Harry S. Truman	Thomas E. Dewey
Party	Democratic	Republican
Home state	Missouri	New York
Running mate	Alben W. Barkley	Earl Warren
Electoral vote	11	0
Popular vote	466,756	341,210
Percentage	56.74%	41.48%
County results
Truman
40–50%
50–60%
60–70%
70–80%
80–90%
Dewey
50–60%
60–70%
70–80%
80–90%
President before election
Harry S. Truman
Democratic
Elected President
Harry S. Truman
Democratic

The 1948 United States presidential election in Kentucky took place on November 2, 1948, as part of the 1948 United States presidential election. Kentucky voters chose 11 representatives, or electors, to the Electoral College, who voted for president and vice president.

Kentucky was won by incumbent President Harry S. Truman (D–Missouri), running with Senator Alben W. Barkley, with 56.74 percent of the popular vote, against Governor Thomas E. Dewey (R–New York), running with Governor Earl Warren, with 41.48 percent of the popular vote.

Dewey performed worse than he had four years previously, with both his margin of loss increasing, and the percentage of the vote he received decreasing, even as he fared much better nationally than he had four years prior. This discrepancy was at least in part due to the choice of President Truman's running mate, Senator Barkley, who himself came from Kentucky.

== Results ==
Presidential candidate	Running mate	Party	Electoral vote (EV)	Popular vote (PV)	
Harry S. Truman of Missouri	Alben Barkley	Democratic	11	466,756	56.74%
Thomas E. Dewey	Earl Warren	Republican	0	341,210	41.48%
J. Strom Thurmond	Fielding Wright	State's Rights	0	10,411	1.27%
Henry A. Wallace	Glen H. Taylor	New Progressive	0	1,567	0.19%
Norman Thomas	Tucker P. Smith	Socialist	0	1,284	0.16%
Claude Watson	Dale H. Learn	Prohibition	0	1,245	0.15%
Edward A. Teichert	Stephen Emery	Socialist Labor	0	185	0.02%

=== Results by county ===
County	Harry S. Truman Democratic		Thomas E. Dewey Republican		Strom Thurmond Dixiecrat		Henry A. Wallace Progressive		Various candidates Other parties		Margin		Total votes cast
County	#	%	#	%	#	%	#	%	#	%	#	%	Total votes cast
Adair	2,144	42.57%	2,839	56.37%	35	0.69%	1	0.02%	17	0.34%	-695	-13.80%	5,036
Allen	1,605	40.28%	2,280	57.21%	48	1.20%	2	0.05%	50	1.25%	-675	-16.93%	3,985
Anderson	2,135	67.69%	971	30.79%	35	1.11%	6	0.19%	7	0.22%	1,164	36.90%	3,154
Ballard	2,702	84.57%	454	14.21%	35	1.10%	0	0.00%	4	0.13%	2,248	70.36%	3,195
Barren	4,095	60.98%	2,437	36.29%	148	2.20%	5	0.07%	30	0.45%	1,658	24.69%	6,715
Bath	2,287	63.69%	1,276	35.53%	19	0.53%	3	0.08%	6	0.17%	1,011	28.16%	3,591
Bell	5,708	56.38%	4,327	42.74%	57	0.56%	8	0.08%	24	0.24%	1,381	13.64%	10,124
Boone	2,320	65.85%	1,151	32.67%	44	1.25%	0	0.00%	8	0.23%	1,169	33.18%	3,523
Bourbon	3,562	67.18%	1,610	30.37%	121	2.28%	2	0.04%	7	0.13%	1,952	36.81%	5,302
Boyd	9,006	56.84%	6,707	42.33%	79	0.50%	19	0.12%	33	0.21%	2,299	14.51%	15,844
Boyle	3,338	62.56%	1,897	35.55%	72	1.35%	5	0.09%	24	0.45%	1,441	27.01%	5,336
Bracken	1,863	59.44%	1,239	39.53%	24	0.77%	0	0.00%	8	0.26%	624	19.91%	3,134
Breathitt	3,295	77.27%	957	22.44%	1	0.02%	1	0.02%	10	0.23%	2,338	54.83%	4,264
Breckinridge	2,623	51.33%	2,407	47.10%	48	0.94%	5	0.10%	27	0.53%	216	4.23%	5,110
Bullitt	1,681	70.48%	673	28.22%	21	0.88%	2	0.08%	8	0.34%	1,008	42.26%	2,385
Butler	1,105	30.21%	2,494	68.18%	42	1.15%	4	0.11%	13	0.36%	-1,389	-37.97%	3,658
Caldwell	2,210	55.46%	1,626	40.80%	137	3.44%	8	0.20%	4	0.10%	584	14.66%	3,985
Calloway	4,896	86.38%	681	12.01%	73	1.29%	7	0.12%	11	0.19%	4,215	74.37%	5,668
Campbell	13,008	51.56%	11,851	46.97%	216	0.86%	96	0.38%	60	0.24%	1,157	4.59%	25,231
Carlisle	1,899	86.36%	279	12.69%	11	0.50%	4	0.18%	6	0.27%	1,620	73.67%	2,199
Carroll	2,626	78.51%	639	19.10%	70	2.09%	3	0.09%	7	0.21%	1,987	59.41%	3,345
Carter	3,082	46.86%	3,472	52.79%	2	0.03%	7	0.11%	14	0.21%	-390	-5.93%	6,577
Casey	1,495	30.44%	3,380	68.83%	9	0.18%	4	0.08%	23	0.47%	-1,885	-38.39%	4,911
Christian	5,582	58.75%	3,242	34.12%	633	6.66%	7	0.07%	38	0.40%	2,340	24.63%	9,502
Clark	3,292	67.07%	1,508	30.73%	95	1.94%	7	0.14%	6	0.12%	1,784	36.34%	4,908
Clay	1,468	31.39%	3,142	67.19%	41	0.88%	1	0.02%	24	0.51%	-1,674	-35.80%	4,676
Clinton	709	23.26%	2,295	75.30%	16	0.52%	2	0.07%	26	0.85%	-1,586	-52.04%	3,048
Crittenden	1,497	43.25%	1,927	55.68%	24	0.69%	0	0.00%	13	0.38%	-430	-12.43%	3,461
Cumberland	794	28.61%	1,947	70.16%	18	0.65%	2	0.07%	14	0.50%	-1,153	-41.55%	2,775
Daviess	8,682	63.25%	4,873	35.50%	126	0.92%	8	0.06%	38	0.28%	3,809	27.75%	13,727
Edmonson	1,031	33.83%	1,984	65.09%	15	0.49%	2	0.07%	16	0.52%	-953	-31.26%	3,048
Elliott	2,095	83.40%	410	16.32%	0	0.00%	4	0.16%	3	0.12%	1,685	67.08%	2,512
Estill	1,937	47.89%	2,056	50.83%	19	0.47%	4	0.10%	29	0.72%	-119	-2.94%	4,045
Fayette	13,202	52.48%	10,959	43.57%	773	3.07%	96	0.38%	125	0.50%	2,243	8.91%	25,155
Fleming	2,722	56.10%	2,088	43.03%	23	0.47%	4	0.08%	15	0.31%	634	13.07%	4,852
Floyd	8,823	73.43%	3,127	26.02%	18	0.15%	28	0.23%	20	0.17%	5,696	47.41%	12,016
Franklin	6,679	75.71%	1,962	22.24%	169	1.92%	2	0.02%	10	0.11%	4,717	53.47%	8,822
Fulton	2,497	80.29%	450	14.47%	161	5.18%	1	0.03%	1	0.03%	2,047	65.82%	3,110
Gallatin	1,381	79.78%	342	19.76%	8	0.46%	0	0.00%	0	0.00%	1,039	60.02%	1,731
Garrard	1,725	47.18%	1,890	51.70%	31	0.85%	1	0.03%	9	0.25%	-165	-4.52%	3,656
Grant	2,633	69.23%	1,154	30.34%	7	0.18%	1	0.03%	8	0.21%	1,479	38.89%	3,803
Graves	8,682	84.49%	1,442	14.03%	134	1.30%	7	0.07%	11	0.11%	7,240	70.46%	10,276
Grayson	2,174	42.69%	2,880	56.56%	18	0.35%	6	0.12%	14	0.27%	-706	-13.87%	5,092
Green	1,628	42.18%	2,186	56.63%	30	0.78%	1	0.03%	15	0.39%	-558	-14.45%	3,860
Greenup	4,186	56.52%	3,168	42.78%	19	0.26%	18	0.24%	15	0.20%	1,018	13.74%	7,406
Hancock	1,146	53.38%	985	45.88%	7	0.33%	4	0.19%	5	0.23%	161	7.50%	2,147
Hardin	3,990	61.89%	2,297	35.63%	126	1.95%	5	0.08%	29	0.45%	1,693	26.26%	6,447
Harlan	9,158	66.80%	4,402	32.11%	113	0.82%	29	0.21%	8	0.06%	4,756	34.69%	13,710
Harrison	3,494	72.76%	1,224	25.49%	64	1.33%	6	0.12%	14	0.29%	2,270	47.27%	4,802
Hart	2,495	51.28%	2,311	47.50%	43	0.88%	3	0.06%	13	0.27%	184	3.78%	4,865
Henderson	5,499	71.92%	1,904	24.90%	167	2.18%	13	0.17%	63	0.82%	3,595	47.02%	7,646
Henry	3,398	73.23%	1,193	25.71%	33	0.71%	2	0.04%	14	0.30%	2,205	47.52%	4,640
Hickman	2,143	83.58%	326	12.71%	87	3.39%	2	0.08%	6	0.23%	1,817	70.87%	2,564
Hopkins	6,149	65.65%	2,608	27.85%	572	6.11%	6	0.06%	31	0.33%	3,541	37.80%	9,366
Jackson	429	13.31%	2,781	86.31%	1	0.03%	1	0.03%	10	0.31%	-2,352	-73.00%	3,222
Jefferson	70,756	48.18%	69,645	47.42%	1,965	1.34%	617	0.42%	646	0.44%	1,111	0.76%	143,629
Jessamine	2,301	59.33%	1,414	36.46%	117	3.02%	7	0.18%	39	1.01%	887	22.87%	3,878
Johnson	2,378	37.20%	3,993	62.47%	5	0.08%	10	0.16%	6	0.09%	-1,615	-25.27%	6,392
Kenton	18,918	61.60%	10,771	35.07%	359	1.17%	98	0.32%	54	0.18%	8,147	26.53%	30,711
Knott	4,660	86.07%	754	13.93%	0	0.00%	0	0.00%	0	0.00%	3,906	72.14%	5,414
Knox	2,814	39.51%	4,241	59.54%	18	0.25%	34	0.48%	16	0.22%	-1,427	-20.03%	7,123
LaRue	1,864	58.14%	1,277	39.83%	49	1.53%	4	0.12%	12	0.37%	587	18.31%	3,206
Laurel	2,187	34.57%	4,107	64.92%	14	0.22%	6	0.09%	12	0.19%	-1,920	-30.35%	6,326
Lawrence	2,372	52.47%	2,117	46.83%	16	0.35%	3	0.07%	13	0.29%	255	5.64%	4,521
Lee	1,058	45.66%	1,233	53.22%	14	0.60%	7	0.30%	5	0.22%	-175	-7.56%	2,317
Leslie	783	24.38%	2,397	74.65%	8	0.25%	4	0.12%	19	0.59%	-1,614	-50.27%	3,211
Letcher	4,741	56.96%	3,560	42.77%	6	0.07%	3	0.04%	14	0.17%	1,181	14.19%	8,324
Lewis	1,449	34.73%	2,708	64.91%	2	0.05%	3	0.07%	10	0.24%	-1,259	-30.18%	4,172
Lincoln	2,920	52.01%	2,593	46.19%	67	1.19%	3	0.05%	31	0.55%	327	5.82%	5,614
Livingston	1,622	70.19%	671	29.04%	11	0.48%	3	0.13%	4	0.17%	951	41.15%	2,311
Logan	4,355	74.25%	1,352	23.05%	126	2.15%	8	0.14%	24	0.41%	3,003	51.20%	5,865
Lyon	1,505	69.84%	582	27.01%	42	1.95%	7	0.32%	19	0.88%	923	42.83%	2,155
Madison	5,344	52.62%	4,619	45.48%	110	1.08%	18	0.18%	65	0.64%	725	7.14%	10,156
Magoffin	2,253	54.49%	1,882	45.51%	0	0.00%	0	0.00%	0	0.00%	371	8.98%	4,135
Marion	3,008	71.20%	1,171	27.72%	31	0.73%	7	0.17%	8	0.19%	1,837	43.48%	4,225
Marshall	2,942	80.10%	711	19.36%	12	0.33%	2	0.05%	6	0.16%	2,231	60.74%	3,673
Martin	911	31.44%	1,964	67.77%	1	0.03%	8	0.28%	14	0.48%	-1,053	-36.33%	2,898
Mason	3,620	58.31%	2,519	40.58%	53	0.85%	6	0.10%	10	0.16%	1,101	17.73%	6,208
McCracken	11,183	75.80%	3,251	22.03%	254	1.72%	26	0.18%	40	0.27%	7,932	53.77%	14,754
McCreary	933	23.45%	3,031	76.19%	1	0.03%	3	0.08%	10	0.25%	-2,098	-52.74%	3,978
McLean	2,104	64.30%	1,112	33.99%	43	1.31%	2	0.06%	11	0.34%	992	30.31%	3,272
Meade	1,915	70.28%	773	28.37%	29	1.06%	2	0.07%	6	0.22%	1,142	41.91%	2,725
Menifee	1,112	71.10%	435	27.81%	11	0.70%	1	0.06%	5	0.32%	677	43.29%	1,564
Mercer	2,682	61.47%	1,599	36.65%	70	1.60%	4	0.09%	8	0.18%	1,083	24.82%	4,363
Metcalfe	1,683	50.30%	1,640	49.01%	8	0.24%	1	0.03%	14	0.42%	43	1.29%	3,346
Monroe	1,249	30.49%	2,812	68.64%	20	0.49%	0	0.00%	16	0.39%	-1,563	-38.15%	4,097
Montgomery	2,731	68.96%	1,083	27.35%	133	3.36%	1	0.03%	12	0.30%	1,648	41.61%	3,960
Morgan	3,488	77.74%	987	22.00%	4	0.09%	6	0.13%	2	0.04%	2,501	55.74%	4,487
Muhlenberg	4,426	55.11%	3,478	43.31%	72	0.90%	22	0.27%	33	0.41%	948	11.80%	8,031
Nelson	3,556	66.64%	1,715	32.14%	46	0.86%	9	0.17%	10	0.19%	1,841	34.50%	5,336
Nicholas	1,885	68.75%	815	29.72%	27	0.98%	0	0.00%	15	0.55%	1,070	39.03%	2,742
Ohio	2,721	44.56%	3,300	54.05%	55	0.90%	5	0.08%	25	0.41%	-579	-9.49%	6,106
Oldham	1,703	60.20%	1,036	36.62%	76	2.69%	4	0.14%	10	0.35%	667	23.58%	2,829
Owen	3,056	85.29%	504	14.07%	15	0.42%	2	0.06%	6	0.17%	2,552	71.22%	3,583
Owsley	437	20.22%	1,718	79.50%	0	0.00%	0	0.00%	6	0.28%	-1,281	-59.28%	2,161
Pendleton	1,958	58.03%	1,373	40.69%	24	0.71%	5	0.15%	14	0.41%	585	17.34%	3,374
Perry	5,614	59.39%	3,755	39.72%	44	0.47%	21	0.22%	19	0.20%	1,859	19.67%	9,453
Pike	11,423	58.16%	8,097	41.22%	56	0.29%	27	0.14%	39	0.20%	3,326	16.94%	19,642
Powell	975	56.92%	719	41.97%	11	0.64%	1	0.06%	7	0.41%	256	14.95%	1,713
Pulaski	3,844	33.40%	7,549	65.59%	68	0.59%	8	0.07%	41	0.36%	-3,705	-32.19%	11,510
Robertson	864	65.75%	442	33.64%	6	0.46%	1	0.08%	1	0.08%	422	32.11%	1,314
Rockcastle	1,309	28.68%	3,236	70.90%	8	0.18%	1	0.02%	10	0.22%	-1,927	-42.22%	4,564
Rowan	2,097	57.90%	1,502	41.47%	18	0.50%	3	0.08%	2	0.06%	595	16.43%	3,622
Russell	1,191	32.96%	2,404	66.54%	5	0.14%	2	0.06%	11	0.30%	-1,213	-33.58%	3,613
Scott	3,548	70.76%	1,352	26.96%	91	1.81%	4	0.08%	19	0.38%	2,196	43.80%	5,014
Shelby	3,840	68.30%	1,626	28.92%	141	2.51%	6	0.11%	9	0.16%	2,214	39.38%	5,622
Simpson	2,752	76.04%	762	21.06%	74	2.04%	4	0.11%	27	0.75%	1,990	54.98%	3,619
Spencer	1,298	71.63%	493	27.21%	19	1.05%	0	0.00%	2	0.11%	805	44.42%	1,812
Taylor	2,415	52.72%	2,087	45.56%	42	0.92%	4	0.09%	33	0.72%	328	7.16%	4,581
Todd	2,929	75.10%	827	21.21%	121	3.10%	4	0.10%	19	0.49%	2,102	53.89%	3,900
Trigg	2,485	73.46%	816	24.12%	69	2.04%	2	0.06%	11	0.33%	1,669	49.34%	3,383
Trimble	1,746	88.72%	194	9.86%	9	0.46%	1	0.05%	18	0.91%	1,552	78.86%	1,968
Union	3,607	81.87%	744	16.89%	37	0.84%	11	0.25%	7	0.16%	2,863	64.98%	4,406
Warren	6,768	60.49%	3,919	35.03%	451	4.03%	7	0.06%	44	0.39%	2,849	25.46%	11,189
Washington	2,121	53.53%	1,813	45.76%	19	0.48%	2	0.05%	7	0.18%	308	7.77%	3,962
Wayne	2,029	44.61%	2,480	54.53%	14	0.31%	11	0.24%	14	0.31%	-451	-9.92%	4,548
Webster	3,288	73.74%	1,087	24.38%	57	1.28%	3	0.07%	24	0.54%	2,201	49.36%	4,459
Whitley	2,932	33.88%	5,611	64.84%	57	0.66%	23	0.27%	30	0.35%	-2,679	-30.96%	8,653
Wolfe	1,918	70.18%	813	29.75%	0	0.00%	2	0.07%	0	0.00%	1,105	40.43%	2,733
Woodford	2,175	61.18%	1,229	34.57%	142	3.99%	3	0.08%	6	0.17%	946	26.61%	3,555
Totals	466,756	56.74%	341,210	41.48%	10,411	1.27%	1,567	0.19%	2,714	0.33%	125,546	15.26%	822,658

==== Counties that flipped from Republican to Democratic ====
- Bell
- Breckinridge
- Campbell
- Fleming
- Hancock
- Lawrence
- Magoffin
- Metcalfe
- Muhlenberg
- Taylor
- Washington

== See also ==
- United States presidential elections in Kentucky
