= Harry Warner (baseball) =

American baseball player and coach (1928–2015)

- Coach
- Born: December 11, 1928; Monroe County, Pennsylvania, U.S.
- Died: April 11, 2015 (aged 86); Reeders, Pennsylvania, U.S.
- Batted: Left Threw: Right

Teams
- As coach: Toronto Blue Jays (1977–1979; 1980); Milwaukee Brewers (1981–1982)

Harry Clinton Warner (December 11, 1928 – April 11, 2015) was an American coach in Major League Baseball and a former first baseman and manager at the minor league level.

== Biography ==
Warner served as a coach for the Toronto Blue Jays during their first three seasons (1977–79) in the American League, then was a member of the Milwaukee Brewers' staff in 1982, the first and only Brewers team to win an American League pennant.

Warner's 17-year playing career (1946–62) peaked at the Double-A level. He spent much of his active career in the farm systems of the Boston Braves/Milwaukee Braves and the Washington Senators. In his finest season, 1954, he batted .317 with 17 home runs for the Salem Senators of the Class A Western International League. Overall, he hit .279 in 1,671 minor league games with 147 home runs. Warner batted left-handed and threw right-handed, stood 6 feet 2 inches (1.88 m) tall and weighed 195 pounds (88 kg).

His managing career began in 1960 with the Class D Erie Sailors of the New York–Penn League, a Washington affiliate. He remained with the organization (the Minnesota Twins after the 1960 campaign) and managed at all levels of the minor leagues through 1976. The following season, he joined the coaching staff of the first Blue Jay manager, Roy Hartsfield, and worked with him for three seasons. In 1980, Hartsfield was succeeded by Bobby Mattick as Toronto's manager, and Warner managed the Jays' Triple-A Syracuse Chiefs farm club of the International League before rejoining the Toronto coaching staff for the final month of the season.

In 1981, he became the third-base coach of the Brewers and in his two seasons in that post the Brewers made the 1981 playoffs, then won the 1982 AL pennant. His managing career concluded with a return to the Twins' organization in 1983, when he led the Class A Visalia Oaks of the California League to a division title. One of his players that season was future Twins star and Baseball Hall of Fame member Kirby Puckett.

All told, Warner accumulated 1,129 wins and 1,067 losses (.514) in 19 seasons as a minor league manager. Later in the 1980s, Warner scouted for the Twins and then the San Diego Padres, based in Reeders, Monroe County, Pennsylvania.

== Death ==
Warner died at age 86 in Reeders.
