= Meisertown, Pennsylvania =

Unincorporated community in Pennsylvania, US

- Unincorporated community
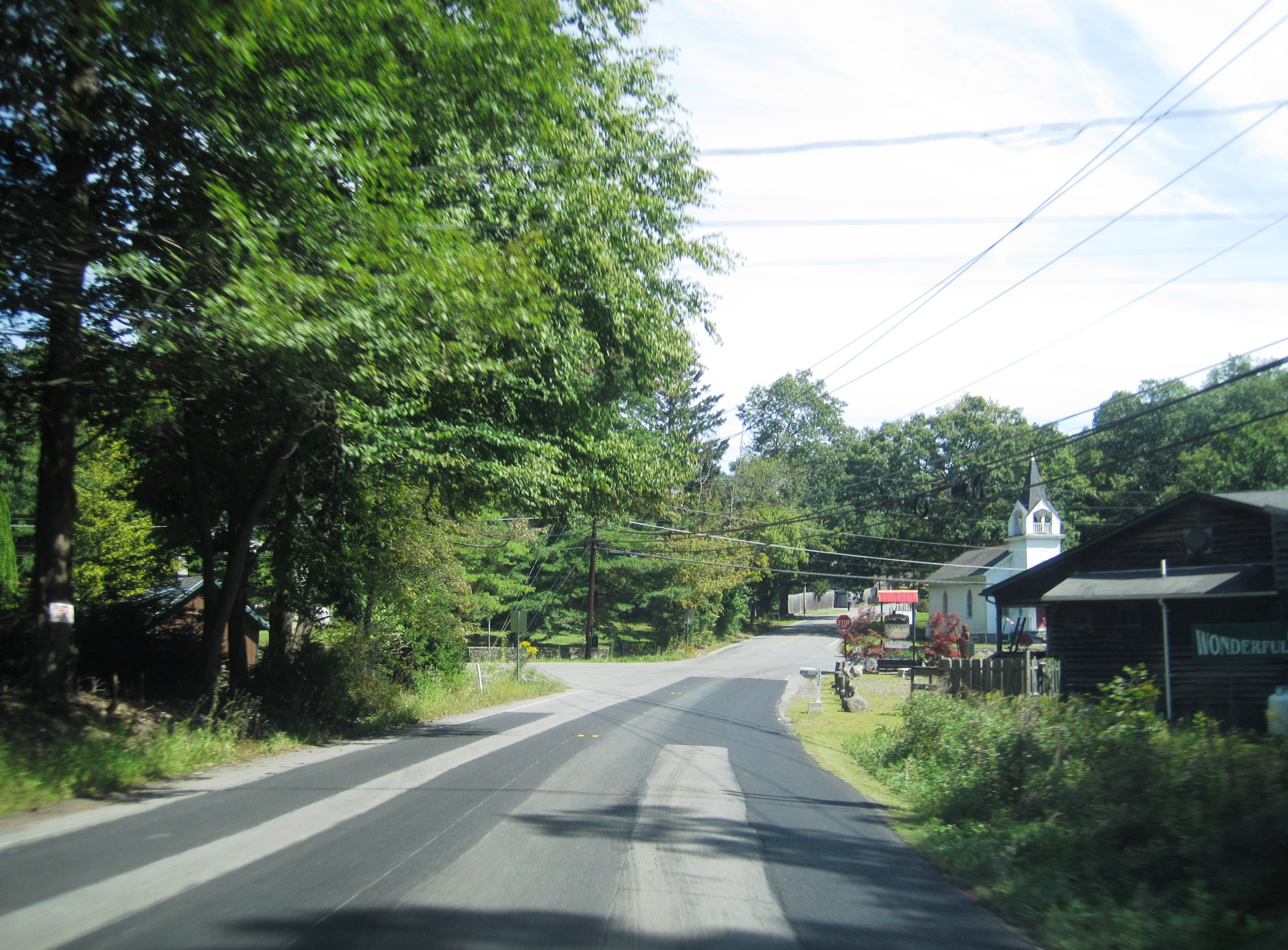
- Meisertown from northbound PA 715

- Location within Pennsylvania
- Coordinates: 41°4′50″N 75°16′7″W
- Country: United States
- State: Pennsylvania
- County: Monroe
- Township: Pocono
- Elevation: 1,099 ft (335 m)
- Time zone: UTC-5 (Eastern (EST))
  - Summer (DST): UTC-4 (EDT)
- ZIP code: 18332
- Area codes: 570 and 272
- GNIS feature ID: 1180873

Meisertown is an unincorporated community in Pocono Township in Monroe County, Pennsylvania, United States. It is located at the intersection of state routes 314 and 715.
