= Tannersville Cranberry Bog =

Sphagnum bog on the Cranberry Creek in Tannersville, Pennsylvania, U.S.

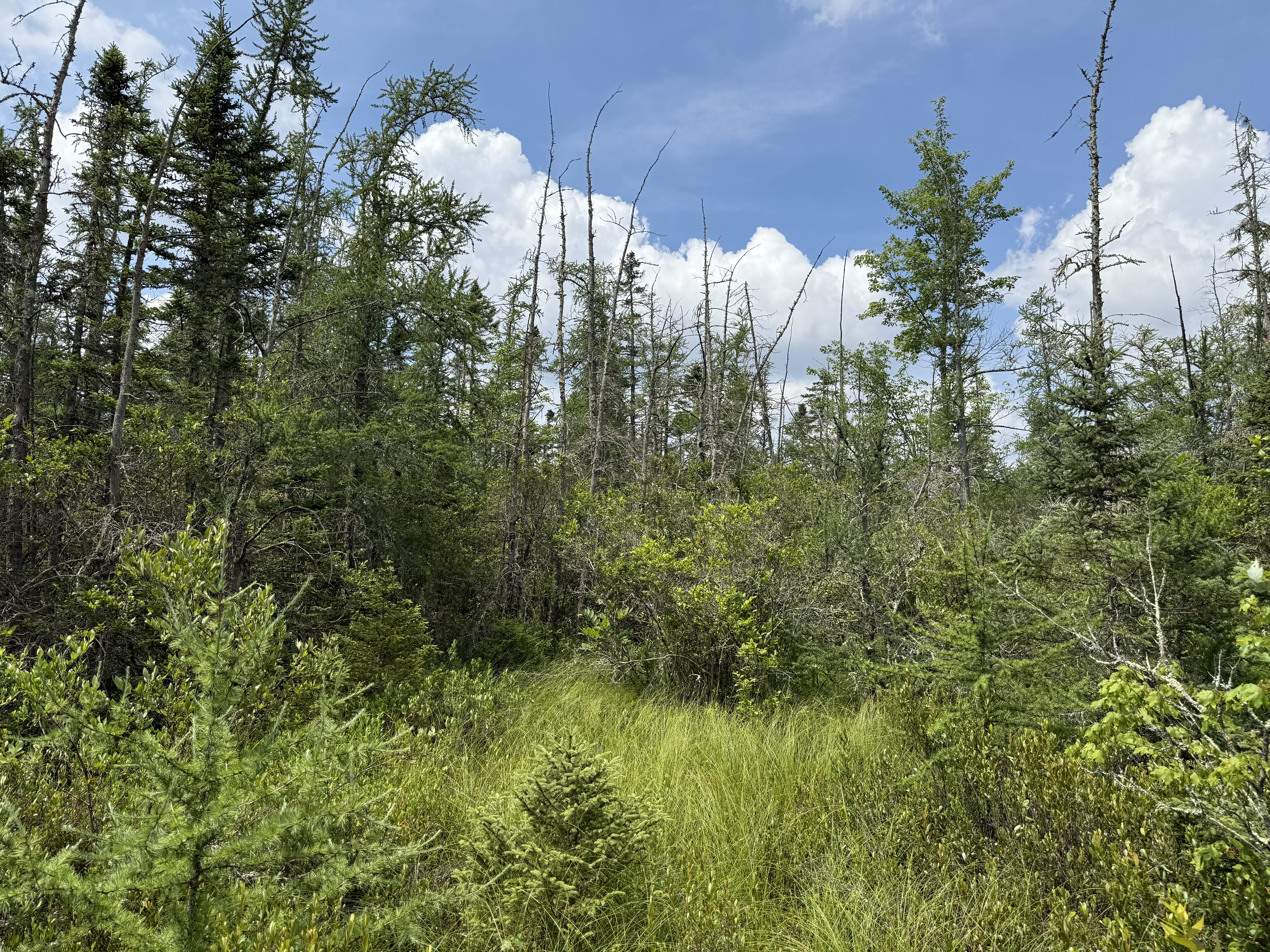
- Black spruce and tamarack growing near the bog's center

- Location within Pennsylvania Location within the United States
- Location: Tannersville, Pocono Township, Monroe County, Pennsylvania
- Coordinates: 41°02′32″N 75°15′32″W
- Area: 1,000 acres (400 ha)
- Established: 1956
- Governing body: The Nature Conservancy
- Website: Website

U.S. National Natural Landmark
- Designated: 1974

The Tannersville Cranberry Bog or Cranberry Swamp is a sphagnum bog on the Cranberry Creek in Tannersville, Pocono Township, Monroe County, Pennsylvania. It is the southernmost boreal bog east of the Mississippi River, containing many black spruce and tamarack trees at the southern limit of their ranges. Technically, it can be classed as an acid fen, as it receives some groundwater flow. The site was designated a National Natural Landmark in December 1974. It was purchased by The Nature Conservancy and the Conservation and Research Foundation in 1957. Like many bogs, its terrain presents an image of solidity, but a liquid mass of decaying peat lies beneath a six-inch (152 mm) layer of sphagnum and a network of supporting tree roots. However, this bog may be viewed from a floating walkway.

== History ==
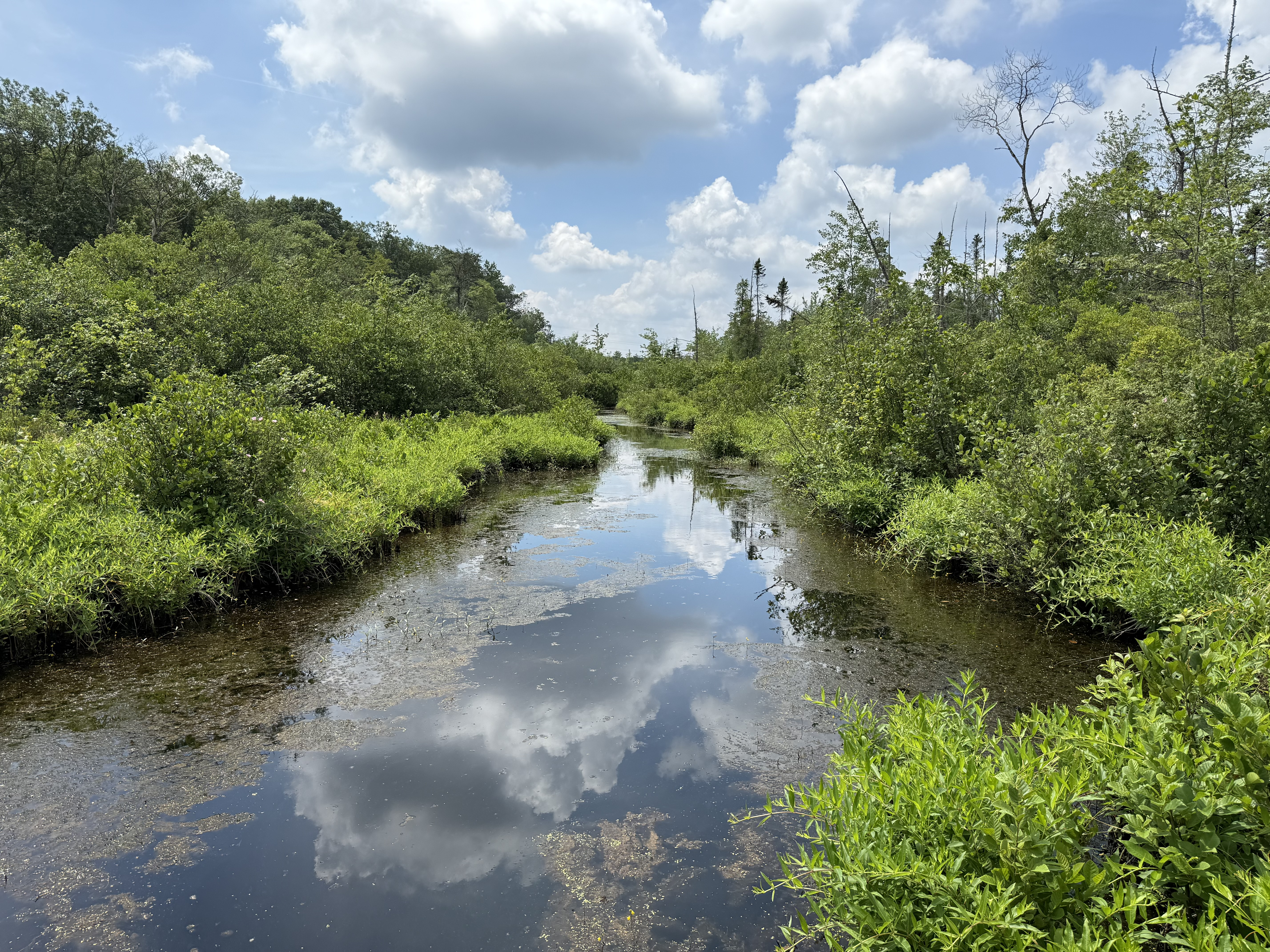
Cranberry Creek

The bog began as a "kettle lake" formed approximately 10,000 years ago by a portion of the retreating Wisconsin Glacier, which initially covered a depth up to the top of the current forest canopy. With restricted air and nutrient flow, sphagnum moss grew out into the lake, eventually forming a layer of peat over 40 feet (12 m) thick. While young bogs may contain an "eye" of open water where sphagnum has not yet reached, no such feature remains in the Tannersville Cranberry Bog. However, a narrow strip of open water marks the course of the Cranberry Creek, where the water is less acidic.

== Flora ==
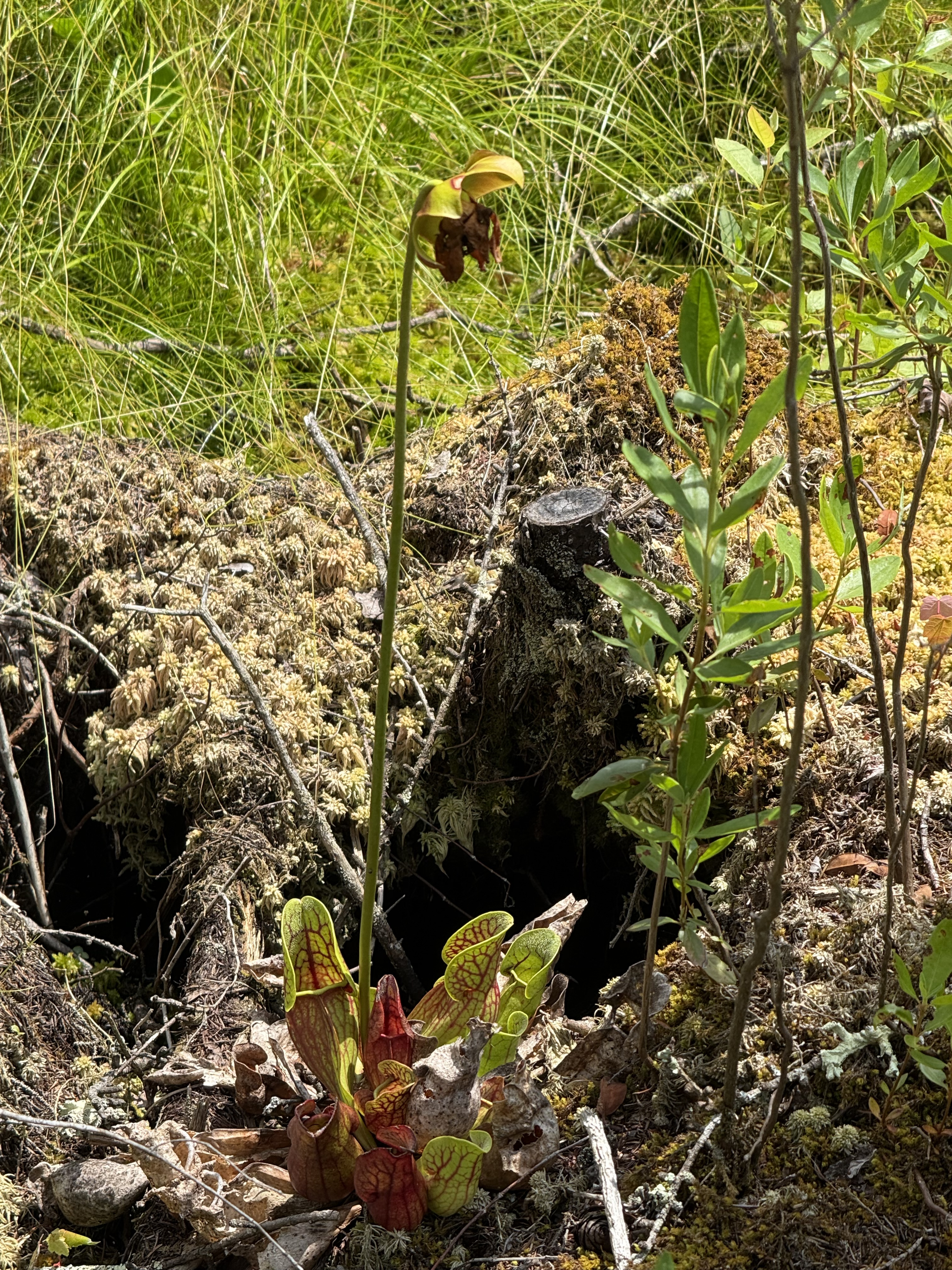
Pitcher plant (Sarracenia purpurea) amidst sphagnum and sedge

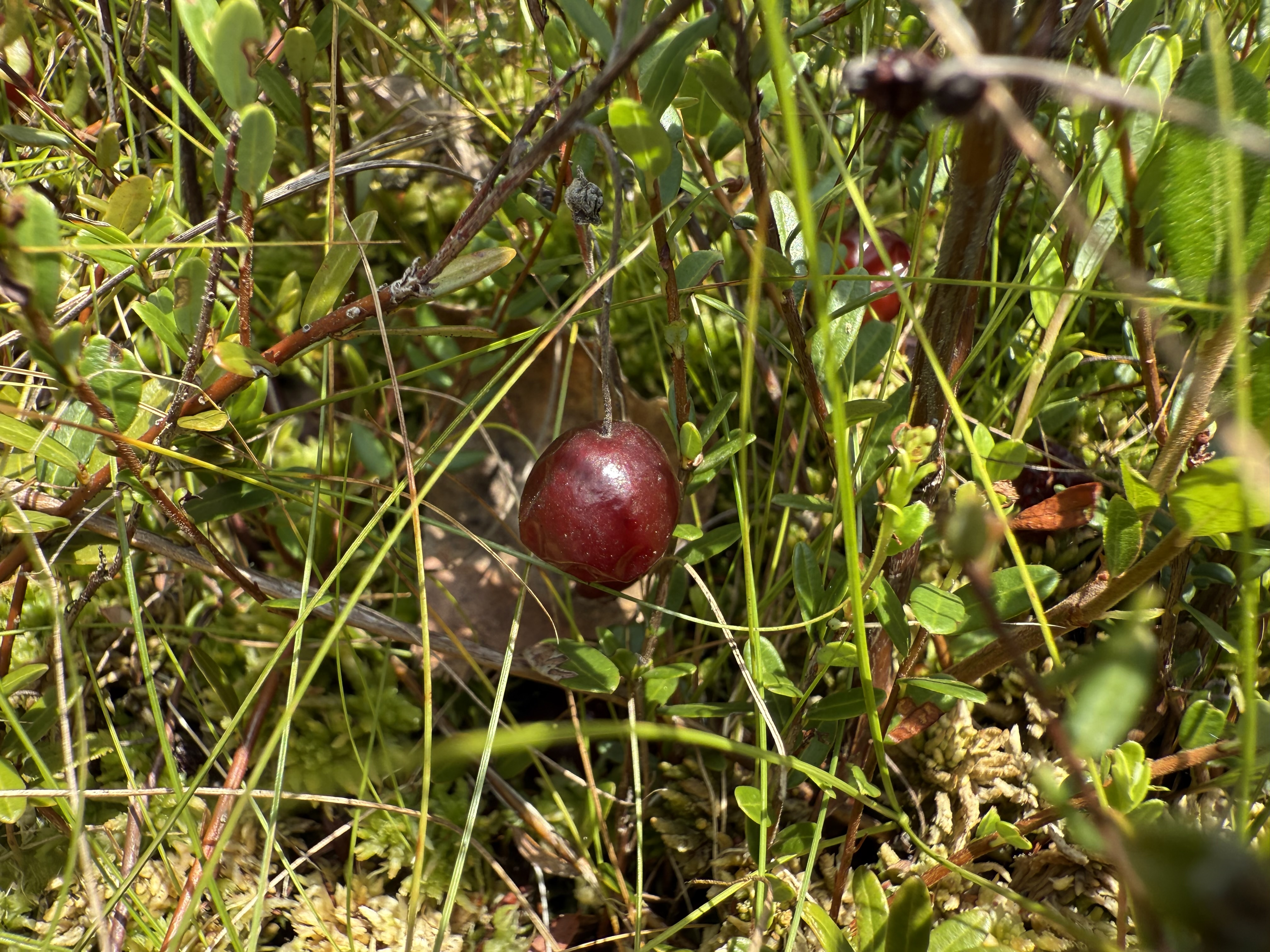
The bog's namesake, a ripe cranberry

- Sphagnum moss
- Conifers
  - black spruce
  - tamarack ("American larch", a deciduous conifer that lends a brilliant yellow hue in autumn)
- Heath plants
  - highbush blueberry
  - leatherleaf
  - cranberry
  - sheep laurel
  - bog-laurel
  - swamp azalea
  - rhododendron
  - bog rosemary
  - swamp loosestrife
  - beggar's tick
- Parasitic plants
  - dodder (on swamp loosestrife)
  - dwarf mistletoe (on black spruce)
- Grasses
  - sedges (in more nutrient-rich areas)
  - cotton grass
  - yellow-eyed grass
- Insectivorous plants
  - pitcher plant
  - sundew
- Sun-loving plants (these are giving way to natural succession as heath plants predominate)
  - Labrador tea
  - golden-club (Orontium aquaticum)
  - hartford fern (Lygodium palmatum)
  - Orchids
    - grass pink
    - white-fringed orchid
    - rose pogonia
    - yellow lady's slipper
    - heart-leaf twayblade (not seen in recent years)
- wild calla
- gold thread
- winterberry
- sumac
  - poison sumac
  - poison ivy

== Fauna ==
- Carnivora
  - black bear
  - bobcat
  - coyote
  - gray fox
  - mink
  - river otter (Cranberry Creek)
- Rodents
  - snowshoe hare
  - beaver
  - porcupine
- Breeding birds
  - brown creeper
  - Nashville warbler
  - Canada warbler
  - wild turkey
  - barred owl
- Others
  - bog turtle
  - pickerel (Cranberry Creek)
  - crayfish (Cranberry Creek)
  - bog copper butterfly (Lycaena epixanthe) (endangered)

== Preservation ==
The call for preservation of this habitat began with William Niering, who as a child visited the bog as the nephew of its owner and was moved ultimately to become a widely recognized authority on bog ecology. The practical benefits of the bog were evident during the Flood of 1955, when bridges downstream of the bog were spared from the massive damage done in much of the Poconos. In 1956 The Nature Conservancy acquired the first 62.5 acres (253,000 m^{2}) for protection. The area held by this organization has increased by gifts and purchases to over 1,000 acres (4.0 km^{2}), and adjoins on additional public lands.

== Public visitation ==
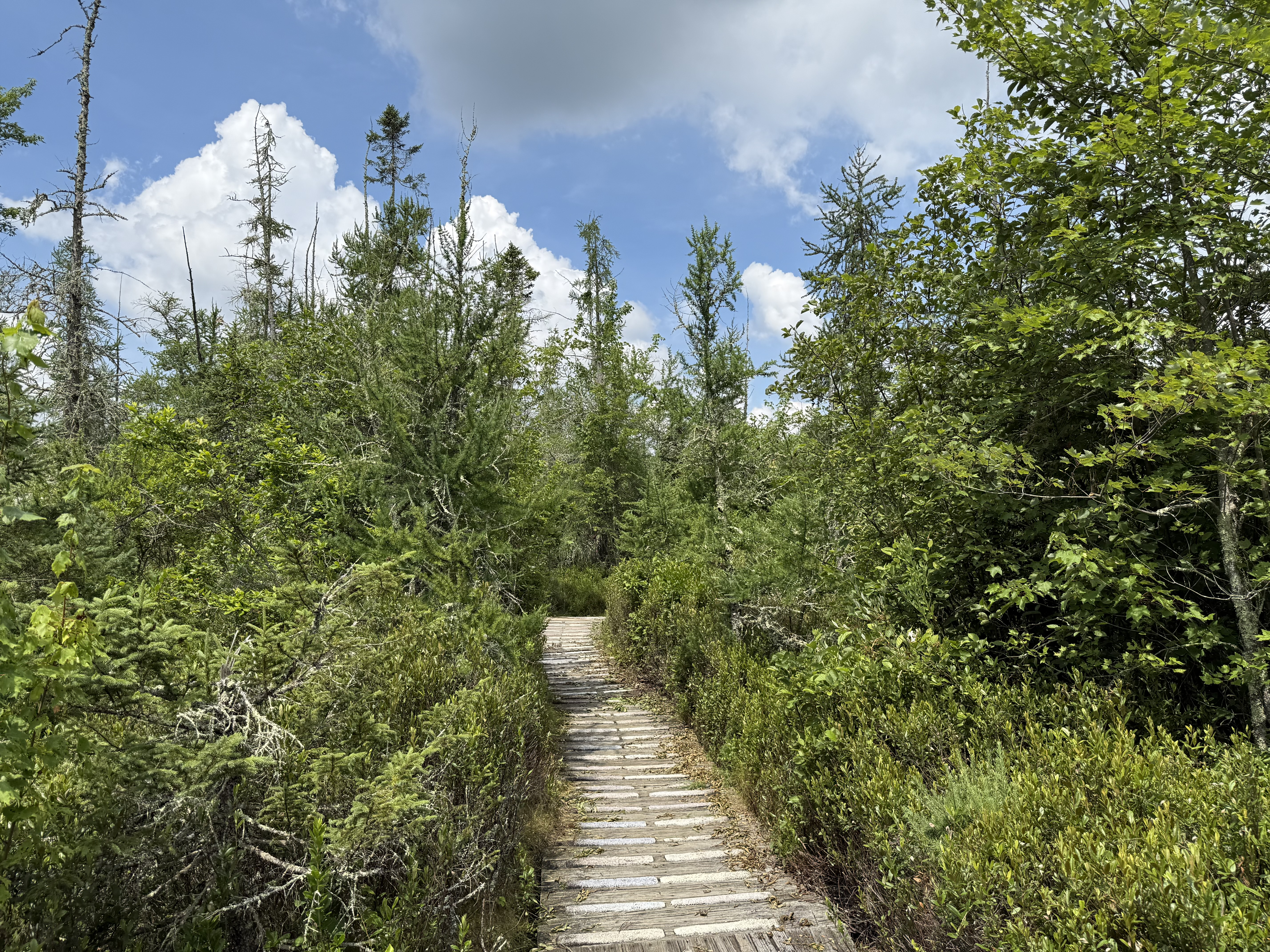
Boardwalk through the bog

Initially, public visitation to the land was not permitted. However, in the 1980s the Monroe County Conservation District negotiated access to the bog for purposes of public education. A floating boardwalk was constructed and expanded to 1,450 feet (440 m) in 1993, which consists of treated lumber supported by floating barrels. Planks are now replaced as needed with a recycled plastic product.

== See also ==
- Appalachian bogs
- Tamarack Swamp
