= Swiftwater Inn =

- Formerly listed on the U.S. National Register of Historic Places
- Location within Pennsylvania Location within the United States
- Location: PA 611, Pocono Township, Pennsylvania
- Coordinates: 41°05′39″N 75°19′40″W
- Area: 2.8 acres (1.1 ha)
- Built: 1778
- NRHP reference No.: 76001651

Significant dates
- Added to NRHP: June 4, 1976
- Removed from NRHP: January 7, 2010

Swiftwater Inn was a historic inn and tavern located in Pocono Township, Monroe County, Pennsylvania. It was originally built in 1778, and was a three-story building with a gambrel roof. It had a two-story front verandah. The building had various additions built in the mid- to late-19th century.

It was added to the National Register of Historic Places in 1976. It was delisted in 2010 after being demolished in 2007 as structurally unsound.
