= Henryville, Pennsylvania =

Unincorporated community in Pennsylvania, US

- Unincorporated community
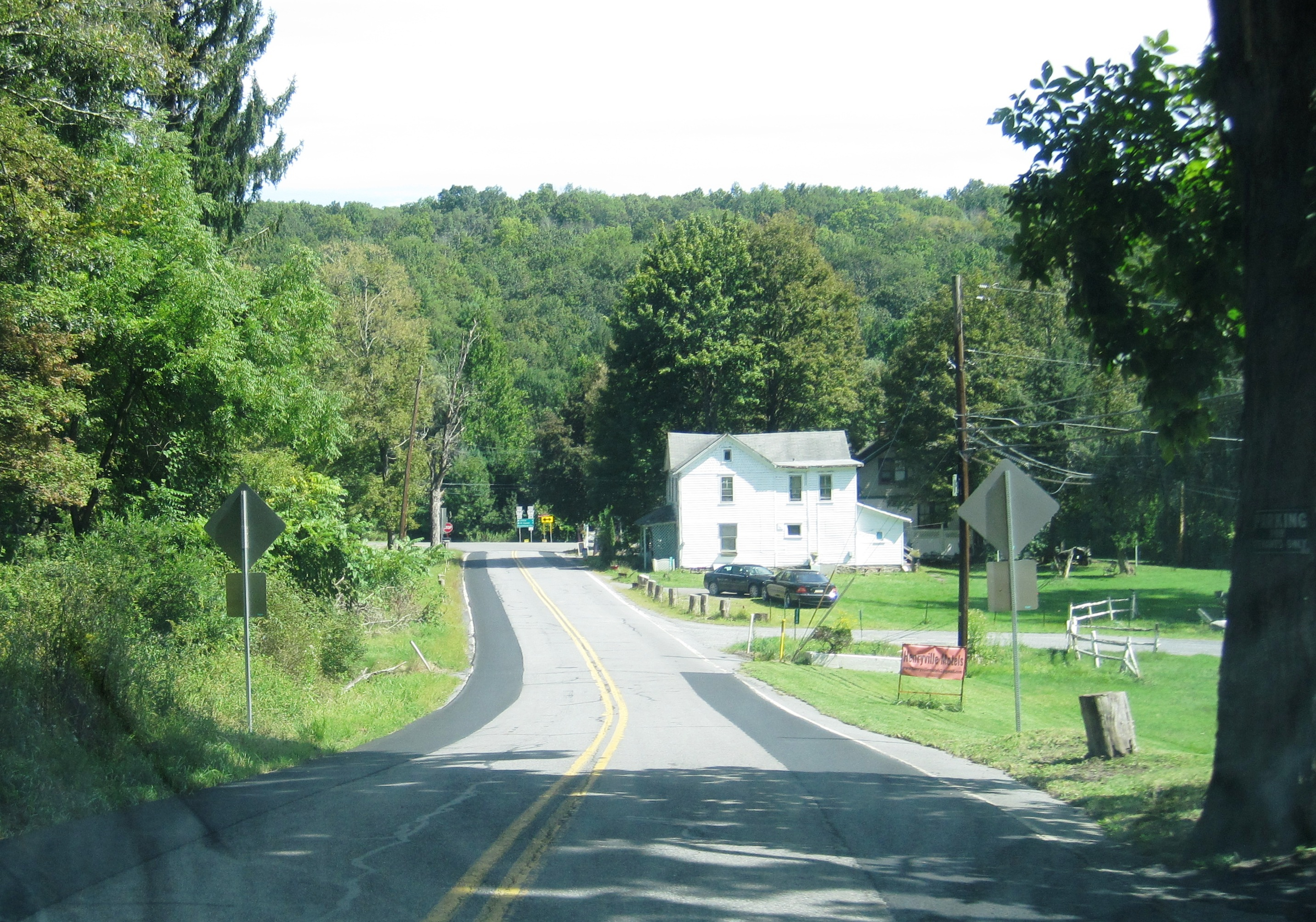
- Henryville along northbound PA 715

- Location within Pennsylvania Location within the United States
- Coordinates: 41°5′37″N 75°14′29″W
- Country: United States
- State: Pennsylvania
- County: Monroe
- Township: Paradise
- Elevation: 781 ft (238 m)
- Time zone: UTC-5 (Eastern (EST))
  - Summer (DST): UTC-4 (EDT)
- ZIP code: 18332
- Area codes: 570 and 272
- GNIS feature ID: 1203783

Henryville is an unincorporated community in Paradise Township, Monroe County, Pennsylvania, United States. Henryville is located by the intersection of Pennsylvania Route 191 and Pennsylvania Route 715.

Henryville has not been included in past census counts.

Henryville was founded on March 24, 1736, by a man named Andrew Comstock. Comstock built infrastructure for what would later become the town of Henryville.
