= McMichaels, Pennsylvania =

Unincorporated community in Pennsylvania, US

- Unincorporated community
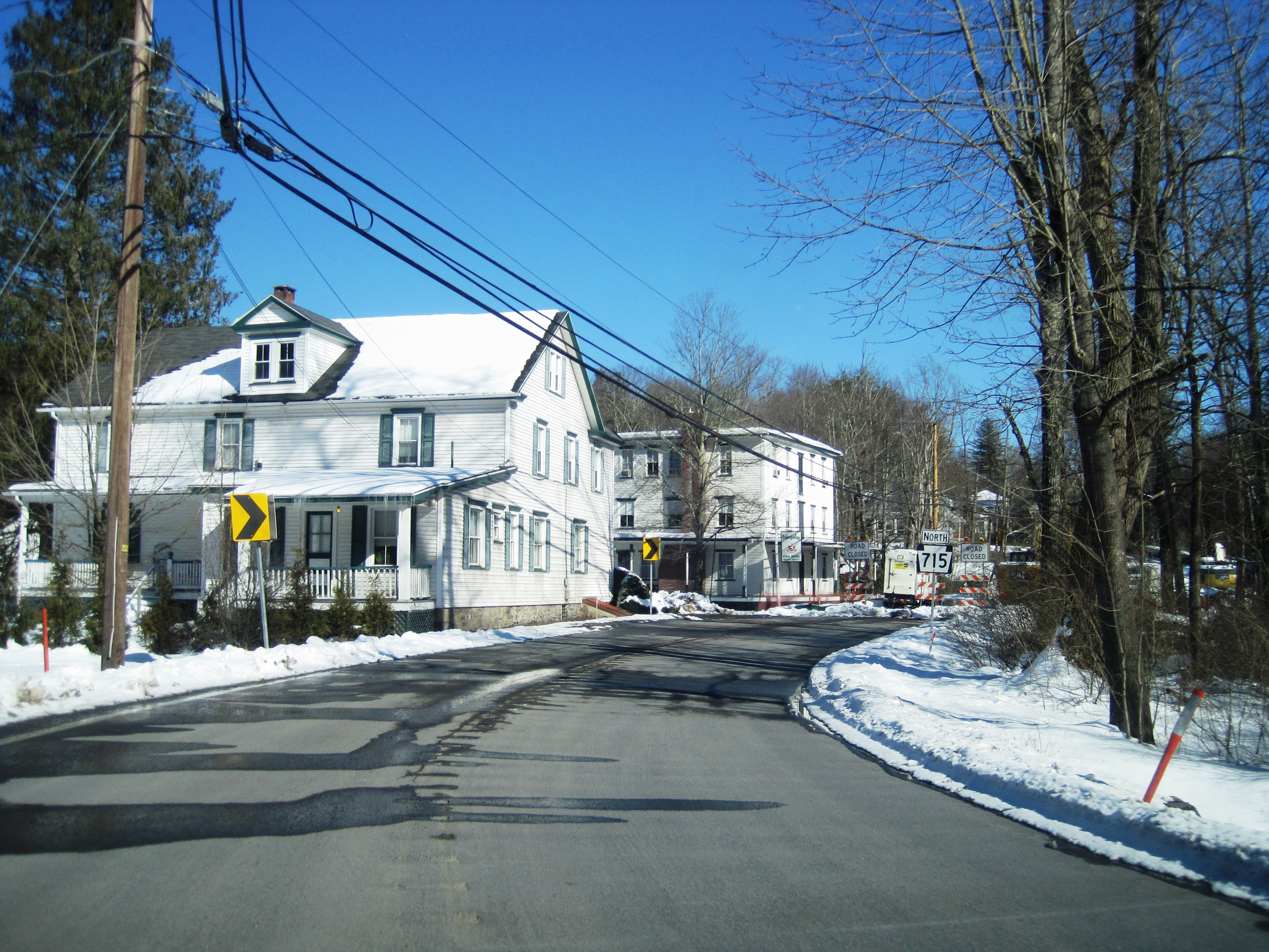
- Photo along PA 715

- Location within Pennsylvania
- Coordinates: 40°59′42″N 75°23′54″W
- Country: United States
- State: Pennsylvania
- County: Monroe
- Township: Chestnuthill
- Elevation: 1,004 ft (306 m)
- Time zone: UTC-5 (Eastern (EST))
  - Summer (DST): UTC-4 (EDT)
- ZIP code: 18360
- Area codes: 570 and 272
- GNIS feature ID: 1180779

McMichaels (also known as McMichael) is an unincorporated community in Chestnuthill Township in Monroe County, Pennsylvania, United States. The village is located along Pennsylvania Route 715 at its crossing of McMichael Creek.
