= Swiftwater, Pennsylvania =

Unincorporated community in Pennsylvania, US

- Unincorporated community
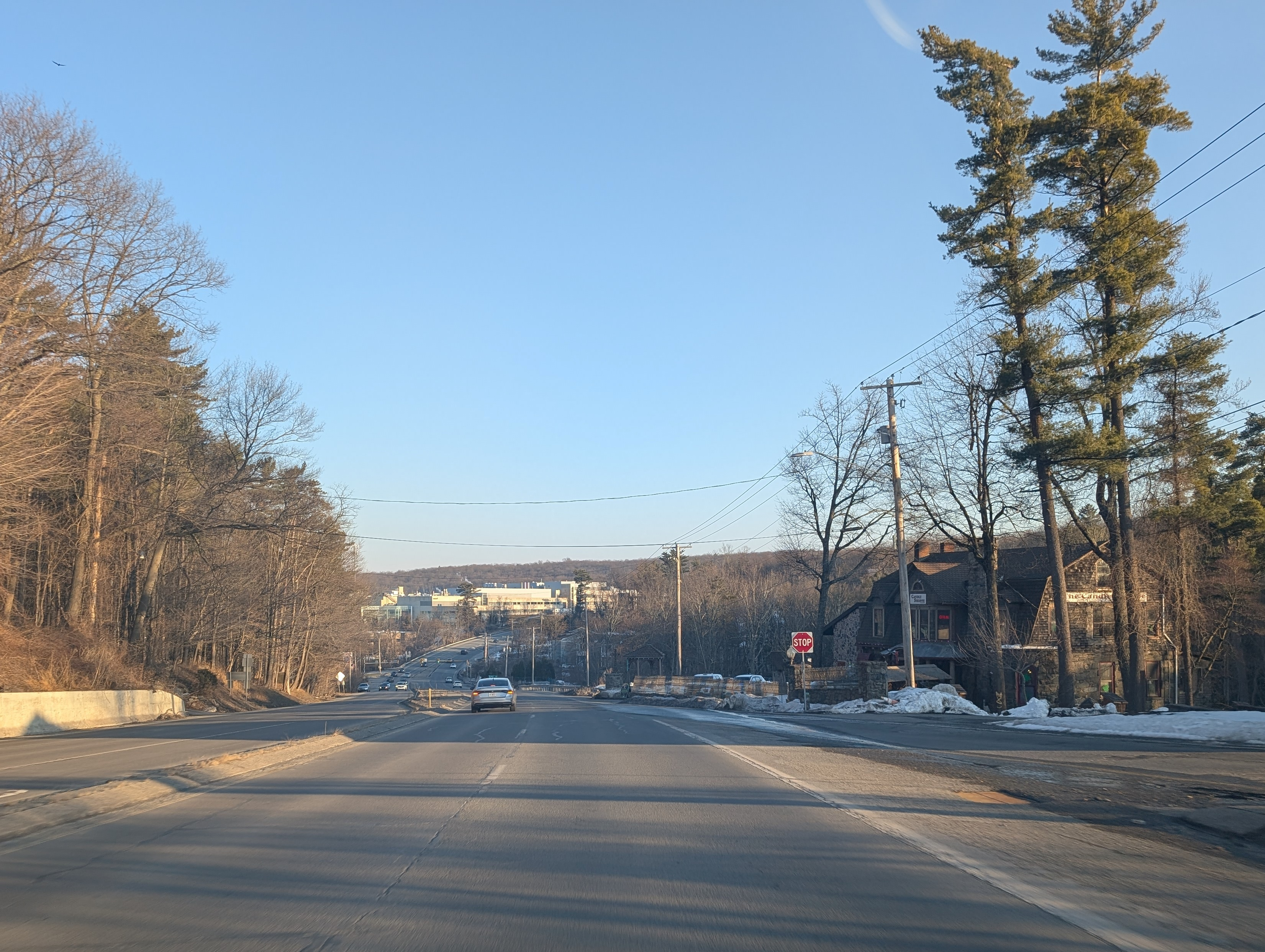
- PA 611 and PA 314 in Swiftwater

- Location within Pennsylvania
- Coordinates: 41°05′43″N 75°19′30″W
- Country: United States
- State: Pennsylvania
- County: Monroe
- Township: Pocono
- Elevation: 1,184 ft (361 m)
- Time zone: UTC-5 (Eastern (EST))
  - Summer (DST): UTC-4 (EDT)
- ZIP code: 18370
- Area codes: 570 and 272
- GNIS feature ID: 1189185

Swiftwater is an unincorporated community that is located in Pocono Township, Monroe County, Pennsylvania, United States.

== History ==
In 1897, Richard Slee created the Pocono Biological Laboratories in Swiftwater.

Swiftwater is currently the home of the Pocono Cheesecake Factory that is located on PA 611. It is also home to the biggest flu vaccine plant in the United States.

== Geography ==
The community is located within the Paradise Creek Watershed. Upper Swiftwater creek is designated by the PA DEP as exceptional value waters (EV). The community of Swiftwater is located within and around unique topographic features in the Poconos, which encompass the Pocono Plateau Escarpment.

Land use consists of 70% forested land, 14% low density residential, 13.6% agricultural lands and approximately 2.4% wetlands. The acres of forested land are near State Game Lands, an important bird area, which support beaver, raccoon, gray, fox, coyote, mink, and snowshoe hares.
