= Pocono Township, Pennsylvania =

Township in Pennsylvania, US

- Township
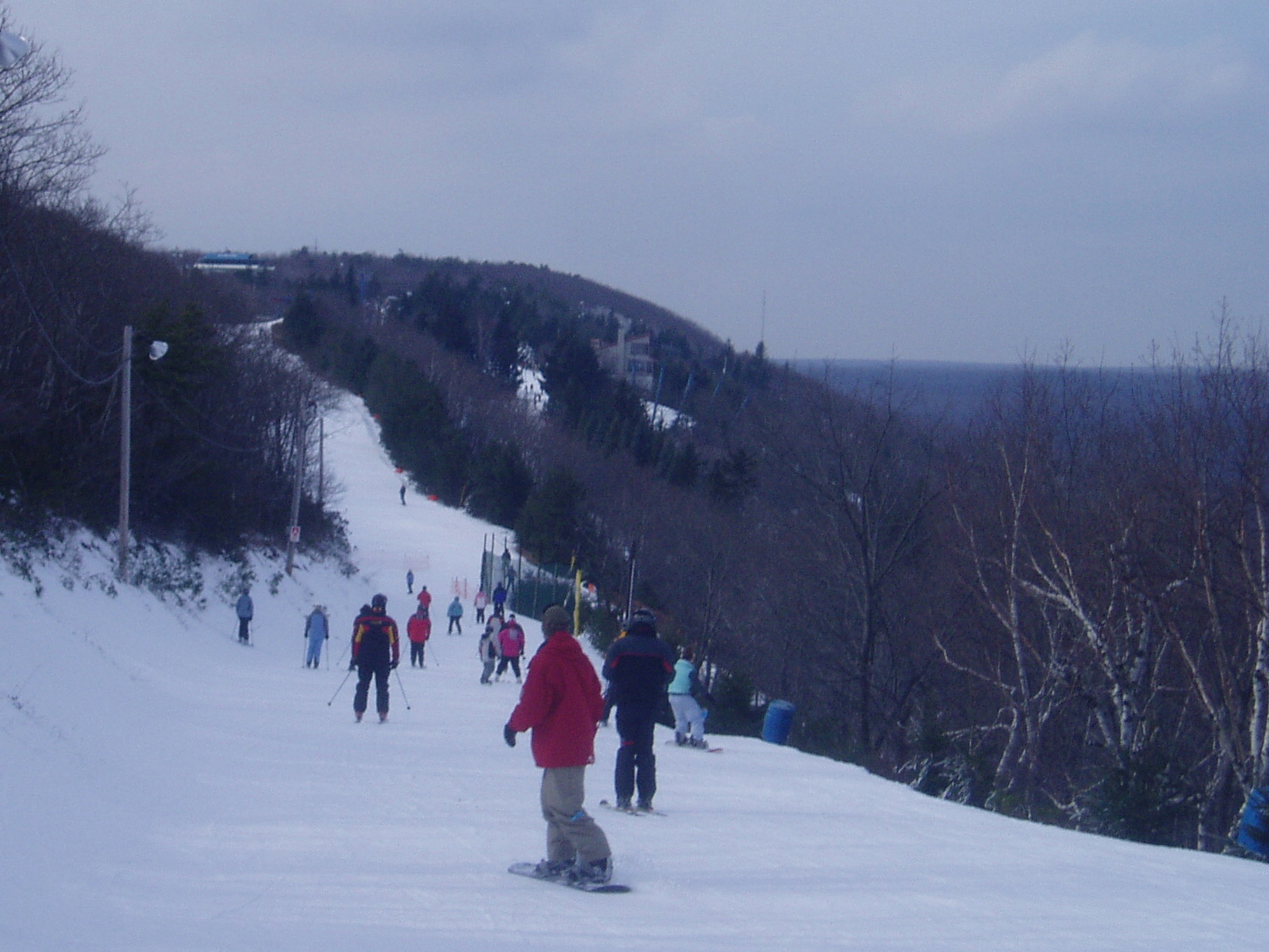
- Skiing at Big Pocono State Park

- Seal

- Location of Pennsylvania in the United States
- Coordinates: 41°04′00″N 75°14′29″W
- Country: United States
- State: Pennsylvania
- County: Monroe
- Established: 1816

Area
  - Total: 34.42 sq mi (89.16 km^{2})
  - Land: 34.24 sq mi (88.68 km^{2})
  - Water: 0.19 sq mi (0.48 km^{2})
- Elevation: 961 ft (293 m)

Population (2020)
  - Total: 10,868 ▼
  - Estimate (2021): 10,931
  - Density: 314/sq mi (121.3/km^{2})
- Time zone: UTC-5 (EST)
  - Summer (DST): UTC-4 (EDT)
- Area code(s): 570
- FIPS code: 42-089-61728
- Website: www.poconopa.gov

Pocono Township is a township in Monroe County, Pennsylvania. The township's government is located in the village of Tannersville, near the site of Camelback Mountain Resort, which is located in the Pocono Mountains and the adjacent Jackson Township. The top of the ski area is within Big Pocono State Park, which is maintained by resort staff. The population was 10,868 at the 2020 census.

== Geography ==
According to the United States Census Bureau, the township has a total area of 34.4 square miles (89.1 km^{2}), of which 34.2 square miles (88.6 km^{2}) is land and 0.2 square mile (0.5 km^{2}) (0.55%) is water. It contains part of the census-designated place of Penn Estates.

== Demographics ==
Historical population
Census	Pop.	Note	%±
2000	9,607		—
2010	11,065		15.2%
2020	10,868		−1.8%
2021 (est.)	10,931		0.6%
U.S. Decennial Census

As of the census of 2000, there were 9,607 people, 3,503 households, and 2,634 families residing in the township. The population density was 280.8 inhabitants per square mile (108.4/km^{2}). There were 4,250 housing units at an average density of 124.2 per square mile (48.0/km^{2}). The racial makeup of the township was 90.21% White, 4.10% African American, 0.15% Native American, 1.33% Asian, 0.07% Pacific Islander, 2.25% from other races, and 1.89% from two or more races. Hispanic or Latino of any race were 5.70% of the population.

There were 3,503 households, out of which 36.0% had children under the age of 18 living with them, 63.4% were married couples living together, 7.9% had a female householder with no husband present, and 24.8% were non-families. 19.1% of all households were made up of individuals, and 6.2% had someone living alone who was 65 years of age or older. The average household size was 2.73 and the average family size was 3.16.

In the township the population was spread out, with 26.1% under the age of 18, 7.0% from 18 to 24, 29.4% from 25 to 44, 26.5% from 45 to 64, and 11.1% who were 65 years of age or older. The median age was 38 years. For every 100 females, there were 98.0 males. For every 100 females age 18 and over, there were 94.6 males.

The median income for a household in the township was $46,107, and the median income for a family was $51,018. Males had a median income of $40,990 versus $25,596 for females. The per capita income for the township was $21,452. About 4.1% of families and 6.0% of the population were below the poverty line, including 5.1% of those under age 18 and 6.1% of those age 65 or over.

United States presidential election results for Pocono Township, Pennsylvania
Year	Republican		Democratic		Third party(ies)	
Year	No.	%	No.	%	No.	%
2024	3,020	49.84%	2,980	49.18%	59	0.97%
2020	2,777	47.88%	2,951	50.88%	72	1.24%
2016	2,469	49.95%	2,294	46.41%	180	3.64%
2012	2,092	45.81%	2,410	52.77%	65	1.42%
2008	2,219	45.69%	2,587	53.26%	51	1.05%
2004	2,292	51.54%	2,120	47.67%	35	0.79%
2000	1,862	51.04%	1,644	45.07%	142	3.89%

== History ==
Pocono is a Native American name purported to mean "a stream between two mountains".

Pocono Township was created as a separate township by a decree of the courts of Northampton County, Pennsylvania in November 1816. It is bounded on the north by Tunkhannock and Tobyhanna townships, east by Stroud Township, Coolbaugh and Paradise townships and west by Jackson Township. It took its name from the mountains which extend across it. Pocono Township comprises 35 square miles (91 km^{2}).

In 1830 the population was 564; in 1840 the population was 973; in 1980 the population was 5,772; in 1990 the population was 7,550.

The Pocono Manor Historic District was listed on the National Register of Historic Places in 1997. The Swiftwater Inn was demolished in 2007, and delisted in 2010.

== Climate ==
According to the Trewartha climate classification system, Pocono Township has a Temperate continental climate (Dc) with warm summers (b), cold winters (o) and year-around precipitation (Dcbo). Dcbo climates are characterized by at least one month having an average mean temperature ≤ 32.0 °F (0 °C), four to seven months with an average mean temperature ≥ 50.0 °F (10 °C), all months with an average mean temperature < 72.0 °F (22 °C) and no significant precipitation difference between seasons. Although most summer days are comfortably humid in Pocono Township, episodes of heat and high humidity can occur with heat index values > 96 °F (36 °C). Since 1981, the highest air temperature was 96.7 °F (36 °C) on July 22, 2011, and the highest daily average mean dew point was 71.0 °F (22 °C) on August 1, 2006. July is the peak month for thunderstorm activity, which correlates with the average warmest month of the year. The average wettest month is September, which correlates with tropical storm remnants during the peak of the Atlantic hurricane season. Since 1981, the wettest calendar day was 6.32 inches (161 mm) on September 30, 2010. During the winter months, the plant hardiness zone is 6a, with an average annual extreme minimum air temperature of −9.1 °F (−23 °C). Since 1981, the coldest air temperature was −20.4 °F (−29 °C) on January 21, 1994. Episodes of extreme cold and wind can occur with wind chill values < −21 °F (−29 °C). The average snowiest month is January, which correlates with the average coldest month of the year. Ice storms and large snowstorms depositing ≥ 12 inches (30 cm) of snow occur once every couple of years, particularly during nor'easters from December through March.

Climate data for Pocono Twp, Elevation 1175 ft (358 m), 1981-2010 normals, extremes 1981-2018
Month	Jan	Feb	Mar	Apr	May	Jun	Jul	Aug	Sep	Oct	Nov	Dec	Year
Record high °F (°C)	65.2 (18.4)	74.7 (23.7)	83.5 (28.6)	90.6 (32.6)	92.1 (33.4)	91.9 (33.3)	96.7 (35.9)	95.5 (35.3)	93.3 (34.1)	85.3 (29.6)	76.8 (24.9)	68.6 (20.3)	96.7 (35.9)
Mean daily maximum °F (°C)	33.8 (1.0)	37.4 (3.0)	45.4 (7.4)	58.3 (14.6)	69.2 (20.7)	77.0 (25.0)	80.8 (27.1)	79.4 (26.3)	72.5 (22.5)	60.9 (16.1)	49.5 (9.7)	38.0 (3.3)	58.6 (14.8)
Daily mean °F (°C)	24.9 (−3.9)	27.8 (−2.3)	35.1 (1.7)	46.6 (8.1)	57.3 (14.1)	65.7 (18.7)	69.8 (21.0)	68.5 (20.3)	61.6 (16.4)	49.9 (9.9)	40.2 (4.6)	29.5 (−1.4)	48.2 (9.0)
Mean daily minimum °F (°C)	16.1 (−8.8)	18.1 (−7.7)	24.8 (−4.0)	34.8 (1.6)	45.4 (7.4)	54.4 (12.4)	58.7 (14.8)	57.5 (14.2)	50.6 (10.3)	39.0 (3.9)	30.8 (−0.7)	21.1 (−6.1)	37.7 (3.2)
Record low °F (°C)	−20.4 (−29.1)	−11.4 (−24.1)	−3.4 (−19.7)	11.8 (−11.2)	27.8 (−2.3)	34.2 (1.2)	39.7 (4.3)	35.5 (1.9)	28.8 (−1.8)	17.7 (−7.9)	1.5 (−16.9)	−11.7 (−24.3)	−20.4 (−29.1)
Average precipitation inches (mm)	3.87 (98)	3.25 (83)	3.74 (95)	4.59 (117)	4.68 (119)	5.06 (129)	4.33 (110)	4.41 (112)	5.24 (133)	5.08 (129)	4.24 (108)	4.39 (112)	52.88 (1,343)
Average snowfall inches (cm)	15.6 (40)	11.2 (28)	11.6 (29)	2.8 (7.1)	0.0 (0.0)	0.0 (0.0)	0.0 (0.0)	0.0 (0.0)	0.0 (0.0)	0.1 (0.25)	2.9 (7.4)	9.3 (24)	53.5 (136)
Average relative humidity (%)	71.5	65.7	62.6	58.4	61.5	70.4	70.1	73.0	73.9	70.8	69.7	73.0	68.4
Average dew point °F (°C)	17.0 (−8.3)	17.8 (−7.9)	23.6 (−4.7)	32.8 (0.4)	44.2 (6.8)	55.8 (13.2)	59.6 (15.3)	59.5 (15.3)	53.2 (11.8)	40.8 (4.9)	31.1 (−0.5)	21.9 (−5.6)	38.2 (3.4)
Source: PRISM

== Transportation ==
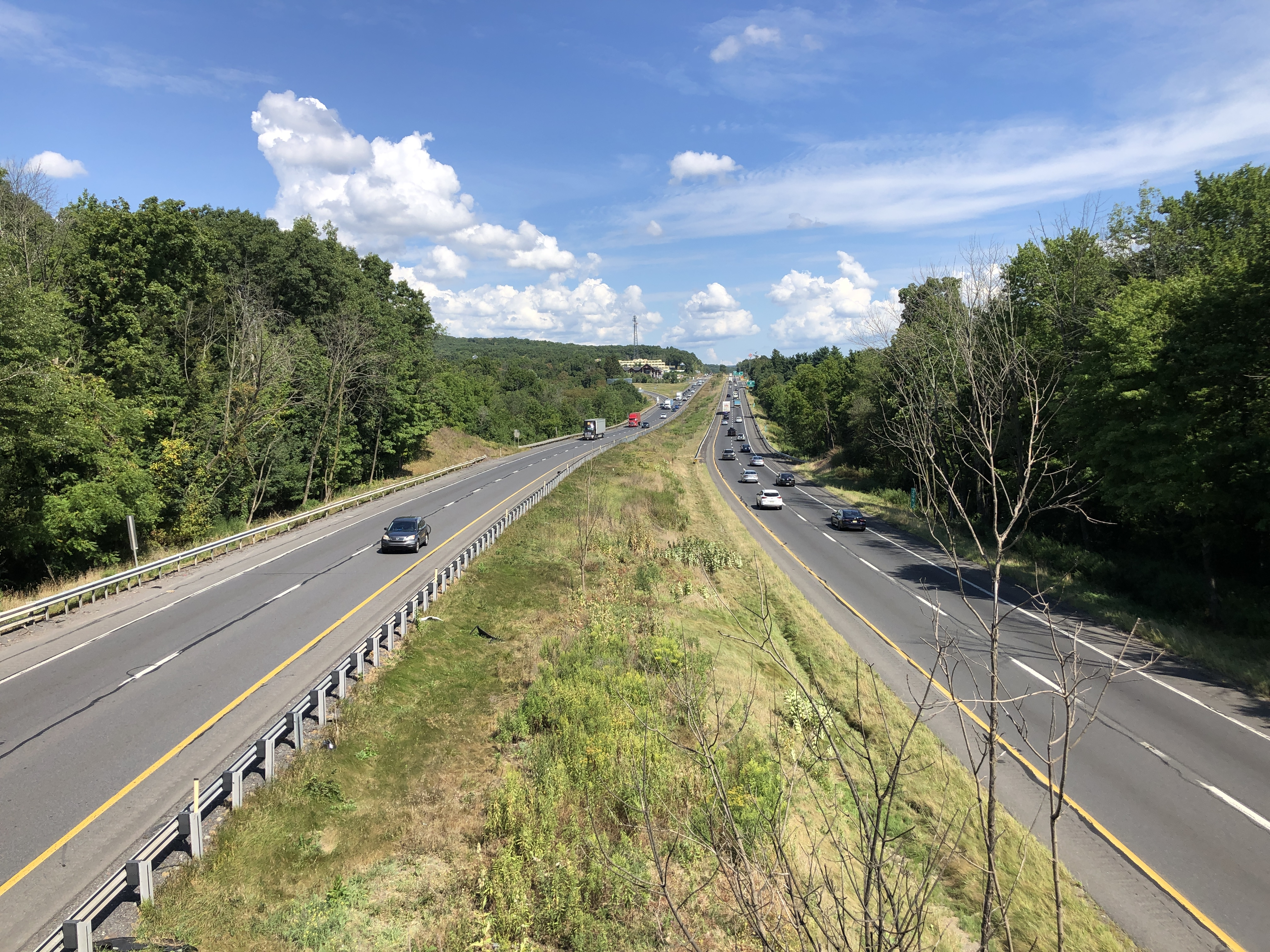
I-80 westbound in Pocono Township

As of 2018, there were 124.38 miles (200.17 km) of public roads in Pocono Township, of which 46.45 miles (74.75 km) were maintained by the Pennsylvania Department of Transportation (PennDOT) and 77.93 miles (125.42 km) were maintained by the township.

Interstate 80 is the most prominent highway serving Pocono Township. It follows the Keystone Shortway along a northwest-southeast alignment across western and southern portions of the township. Pennsylvania Route 191 briefly crosses the eastern tip of the township on a north-south alignment. Pennsylvania Route 314 follows a northwest-southeast alignment along the northeastern edge of the township. Pennsylvania Route 611 follows a north-south alignment through the center of the township. Finally, Pennsylvania Route 715 follows a southwest-northeast alignment through the middle of the township.

== Ecology ==
According to the A. W. Kuchler U.S. potential natural vegetation types, Pocono Township would have a dominant vegetation type of Appalachian Oak (104) with a dominant vegetation form of Eastern Hardwood Forest (25). The peak spring bloom typically occurs in late-April and peak fall color usually occurs in mid-October. The plant hardiness zone is 6a with an average annual extreme minimum air temperature of −9.1 °F (−23 °C).

The township is home to the Tannersville Cranberry Bog, the southernmost boreal bog in the Eastern United States.
