= Reeders, Pennsylvania =

Unincorporated community in Pennsylvania, US

- Unincorporated community
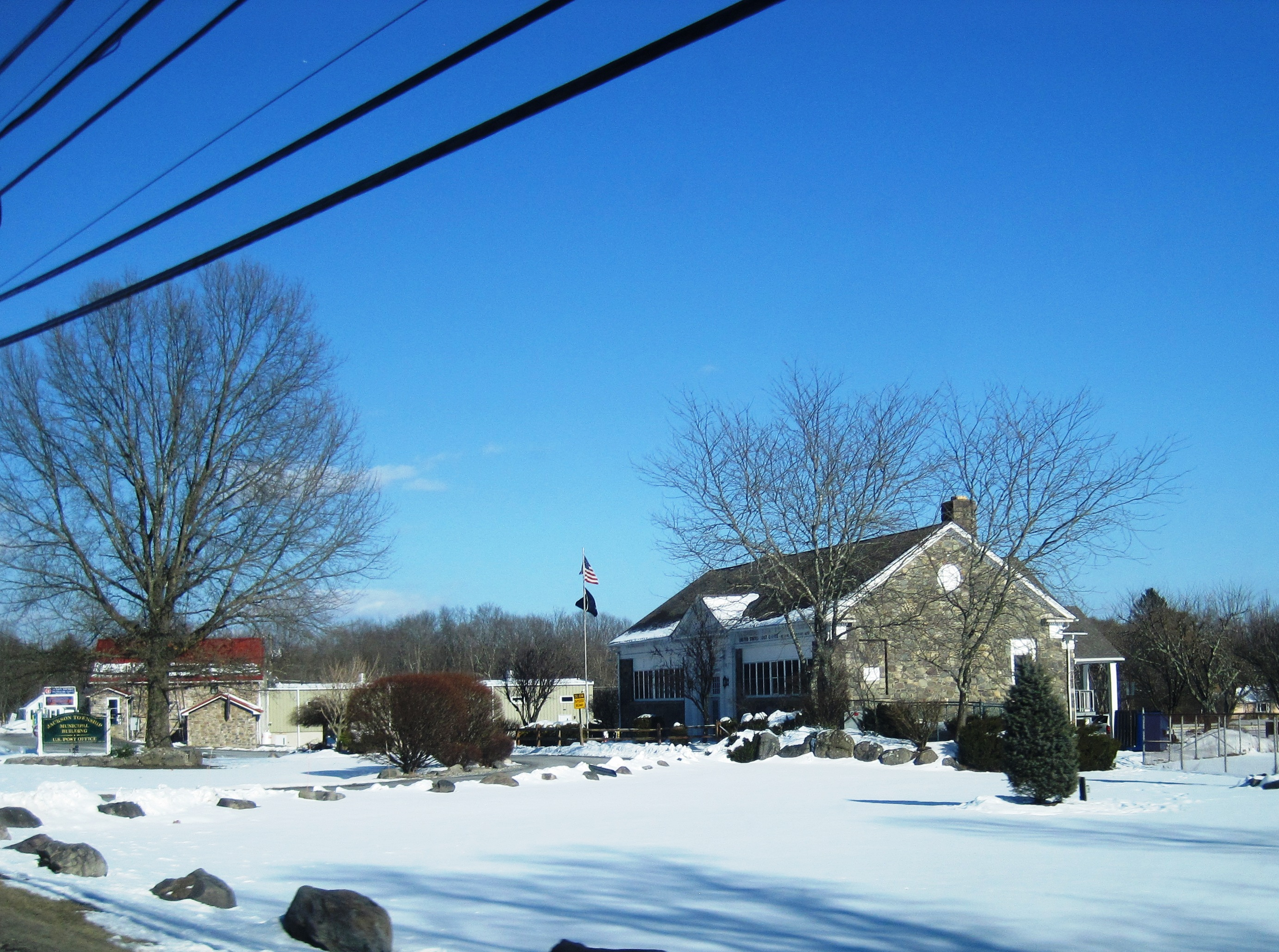
- Jackson Township municipal building and Reeders post office within the village

- Location within Pennsylvania
- Coordinates: 41°1′8″N 75°20′10″W
- Country: United States
- State: Pennsylvania
- County: Monroe
- Township: Jackson
- Elevation: 991 ft (302 m)

Population (2016)
  - Total: 1,326
- Time zone: UTC-5 (Eastern (EST))
  - Summer (DST): UTC-4 (EDT)
- ZIP code: 18352
- Area code(s): 570
- GNIS feature ID: 1184826

Reeders is an unincorporated community in Jackson Township in Monroe County, Pennsylvania, United States. Reeders is located at the intersection of Pennsylvania Route 715 and Reeders Run Road. The village is also home to Jackson Township Volunteer Fire Company, which was founded in 1952.
