= Dale H. Learn =

American real estate agent and politician

Personal details
- Born: December 8, 1897 Paradise Township, Pennsylvania, U.S.
- Died: March 16, 1976 (aged 78)
- Party: Prohibition
- Education: East Stroudsburg State Teachers College; Dickinson College; Dickinson School of Law
- Occupation: Real Estate Agent
- Website: prohibitionists.org

Dale H. Learn (December 8, 1897 – March 16, 1976) was an American real estate agent and politician from Pennsylvania. A lifelong temperance advocate, Learn was twice a candidate for political office with the Prohibition Party; in 1942, he ran for Governor of Pennsylvania and in 1948, he was the party's vice-presidential nominee.

He was the Prohibition Party's candidate for Governor of Pennsylvania in 1942. He finished in third place (17,385 votes or 0.68%).

In June 1947, the Prohibition Party nominated a presidential ticket for the following year which included Learn as vice-president and Claude A. Watson of California at the top of the ticket. The pair received 103,708 votes (0.21%), which placed it sixth nationwide.

== Personal life ==
Learn was born in Paradise Township, Monroe County, Pennsylvania to Milton S. and Nettie (Bush) Learn. He was an alumnus of East Stroudsburg State Teachers College, Dickinson College, and the Dickinson School of Law. A real estate agent, Learn was the youngest person to serve as president of the Pennsylvania Real Estate Association. He died in 1976 and is buried at Laurelwood Cemetery in Stroudsburg, Pennsylvania.
