= Paradise Township, Monroe County, Pennsylvania =

Township in Pennsylvania, US

Paradise Township
- Township
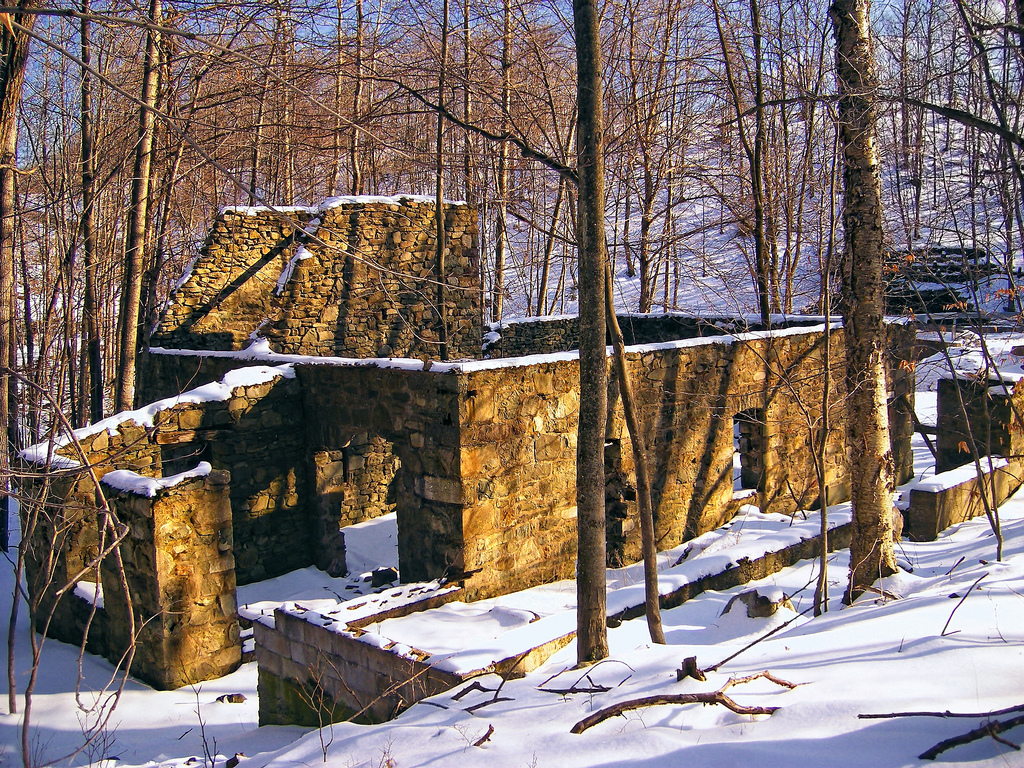
- Industrial remnants are surrounded by forest in Paradise Township

- Seal

- Location of Pennsylvania in the United States
- Coordinates: 41°07′36″N 75°14′58″W
- Country: United States
- State: Pennsylvania
- County: Monroe

Area
  - Total: 21.39 sq mi (55.39 km^{2})
  - Land: 21.29 sq mi (55.14 km^{2})
  - Water: 0.093 sq mi (0.24 km^{2})
- Elevation: 1,053 ft (321 m)

Population (2020)
  - Total: 2,898 ▼
  - Estimate (2021): 2,916
  - Density: 144.7/sq mi (55.86/km^{2})
- Time zone: UTC-5 (EST)
  - Summer (DST): UTC-4 (EDT)
- Area code: 570
- FIPS code: 42-089-57856
- Website: www.paradisetownship.com

Paradise Township is a township in Monroe County, Pennsylvania in the Pocono Mountains. The population was 2,898 at the 2020 census.

== Geography ==
According to the United States Census Bureau, the township has a total area of 21.5 square miles (55.8 km^{2}), of which 21.4 square miles (55.5 km^{2}) is land and 0.1 square mile (0.2 km^{2}) (0.42%) is water.

== Demographics ==
Historical population
Census	Pop.	Note	%±
1870	662		—
1880	688		3.9%
1890	672		−2.3%
1900	727		8.2%
1910	710		−2.3%
1920	656		−7.6%
1930	681		3.8%
1940	697		2.3%
1950	745		6.9%
1960	982		31.8%
1970	1,207		22.9%
1980	1,983		64.3%
1990	2,230		12.5%
2000	2,671		19.8%
2010	3,186		19.3%
2020	2,898		−9.0%
2021 (est.)	2,916		0.6%
U.S. Decennial Census

As of the census of 2000, there were 2,671 people, 996 households, and 724 families residing in the township. The population density was 124.6 inhabitants per square mile (48.1/km^{2}). There were 1,306 housing units at an average density of 60.9 per square mile (23.5/km^{2}). The racial makeup of the township was 92.40% White, 3.59% African American, 0.49% Native American, 1.05% Asian, 0.04% Pacific Islander, 1.05% from other races, and 1.39% from two or more races. Hispanic or Latino of any race were 3.18% of the population.

There were 996 households, out of which 30.8% had children under the age of 18 living with them, 59.9% were married couples living together, 9.2% had a female householder with no husband present, and 27.3% were non-families. 22.0% of all households were made up of individuals, and 9.9% had someone living alone who was 65 years of age or older. The average household size was 2.57 and the average family size was 3.00.

In the township the population was spread out, with 22.7% under the age of 18, 7.2% from 18 to 24, 27.3% from 25 to 44, 27.9% from 45 to 64, and 14.9% who were 65 years of age or older. The median age was 41 years. For every 100 females, there were 94.8 males. For every 100 females age 18 and over, there were 96.7 males.

The median income for a household in the township was $48,320, and the median income for a family was $57,353. Males had a median income of $35,950 versus $27,422 for females. The per capita income for the township was $21,408. About 4.9% of families and 11.3% of the population were below the poverty line, including 12.9% of those under age 18 and 15.8% of those age 65 or over.

== Climate ==
According to the Trewartha climate classification system, Paradise Township has a Temperate Continental climate (Dc) with warm summers (b), cold winters (o) and year-around precipitation (Dcbo). Dcbo climates are characterized by at least one month having an average mean temperature ≤ 32.0 °F (0 °C), four to seven months with an average mean temperature ≥ 50.0 °F (10 °C), all months with an average mean temperature < 72.0 °F (22 °C) and no significant precipitation difference between seasons. Although most summer days are comfortably humid in Paradise Township, episodes of heat and high humidity can occur with heat index values > 96 °F (36 °C). Since 1981, the highest air temperature was 96.2 °F (36 °C) on July 22, 2011, and the highest daily average mean dew point was 70.8 °F (22 °C) on August 1, 2006. July is the peak month for thunderstorm activity, which correlates with the average warmest month of the year. The average wettest month is September, which correlates with tropical storm remnants during the peak of the Atlantic hurricane season. Since 1981, the wettest calendar day was 6.29 inches (160 mm) on September 30, 2010. During the winter months, the plant hardiness zone is 5b, with an average annual extreme minimum air temperature of −10.6 °F (−24 °C). Since 1981, the coldest air temperature was −21.4 °F (−30 °C) on January 21, 1994. Episodes of extreme cold and wind can occur with wind chill values < −23 °F (−31 °C). Ice storms and large snowstorms depositing ≥ 12 inches (30 cm) of snow occur once every couple of years, particularly during nor’easters from December through March.

Climate data for Paradise Twp, Elevation 1043 ft (318 m), 1981-2010 normals, extremes 1981-2018
Month	Jan	Feb	Mar	Apr	May	Jun	Jul	Aug	Sep	Oct	Nov	Dec	Year
Record high °F (°C)	64.5 (18.1)	74.1 (23.4)	83.5 (28.6)	90.3 (32.4)	92.1 (33.4)	91.8 (33.2)	96.2 (35.7)	95.2 (35.1)	93.2 (34.0)	85.3 (29.6)	76.8 (24.9)	68.2 (20.1)	96.2 (35.7)
Mean daily maximum °F (°C)	33.3 (0.7)	36.8 (2.7)	45.5 (7.5)	58.6 (14.8)	69.3 (20.7)	77.2 (25.1)	80.8 (27.1)	79.8 (26.6)	72.7 (22.6)	61.3 (16.3)	49.6 (9.8)	37.6 (3.1)	58.6 (14.8)
Daily mean °F (°C)	24.1 (−4.4)	26.8 (−2.9)	34.9 (1.6)	46.6 (8.1)	56.9 (13.8)	65.5 (18.6)	69.5 (20.8)	68.3 (20.2)	61.0 (16.1)	49.5 (9.7)	39.9 (4.4)	29.1 (−1.6)	47.8 (8.8)
Mean daily minimum °F (°C)	14.9 (−9.5)	16.9 (−8.4)	24.4 (−4.2)	34.6 (1.4)	44.5 (6.9)	53.7 (12.1)	58.2 (14.6)	56.8 (13.8)	49.3 (9.6)	37.6 (3.1)	30.2 (−1.0)	20.7 (−6.3)	36.9 (2.7)
Record low °F (°C)	−21.4 (−29.7)	−12.9 (−24.9)	−5.1 (−20.6)	11.2 (−11.6)	26.9 (−2.8)	33.8 (1.0)	38.9 (3.8)	34.6 (1.4)	27.8 (−2.3)	16.8 (−8.4)	−0.3 (−17.9)	−13.4 (−25.2)	−21.4 (−29.7)
Average precipitation inches (mm)	3.68 (93)	3.14 (80)	3.70 (94)	4.42 (112)	4.56 (116)	4.84 (123)	4.33 (110)	4.27 (108)	5.06 (129)	4.92 (125)	4.10 (104)	4.22 (107)	51.24 (1,301)
Average snowfall inches (cm)	14.8 (38)	10.6 (27)	11.0 (28)	2.6 (6.6)	0.0 (0.0)	0.0 (0.0)	0.0 (0.0)	0.0 (0.0)	0.0 (0.0)	0.1 (0.25)	2.8 (7.1)	8.9 (23)	50.9 (129)
Average relative humidity (%)	72.1	66.4	62.3	58.0	60.8	70.1	70.3	72.7	73.6	69.9	69.7	73.2	68.3
Average dew point °F (°C)	16.4 (−8.7)	17.1 (−8.3)	23.3 (−4.8)	32.6 (0.3)	43.5 (6.4)	55.5 (13.1)	59.4 (15.2)	59.2 (15.1)	52.5 (11.4)	40.1 (4.5)	30.8 (−0.7)	21.6 (−5.8)	37.8 (3.2)
Source: PRISM

== Transportation ==
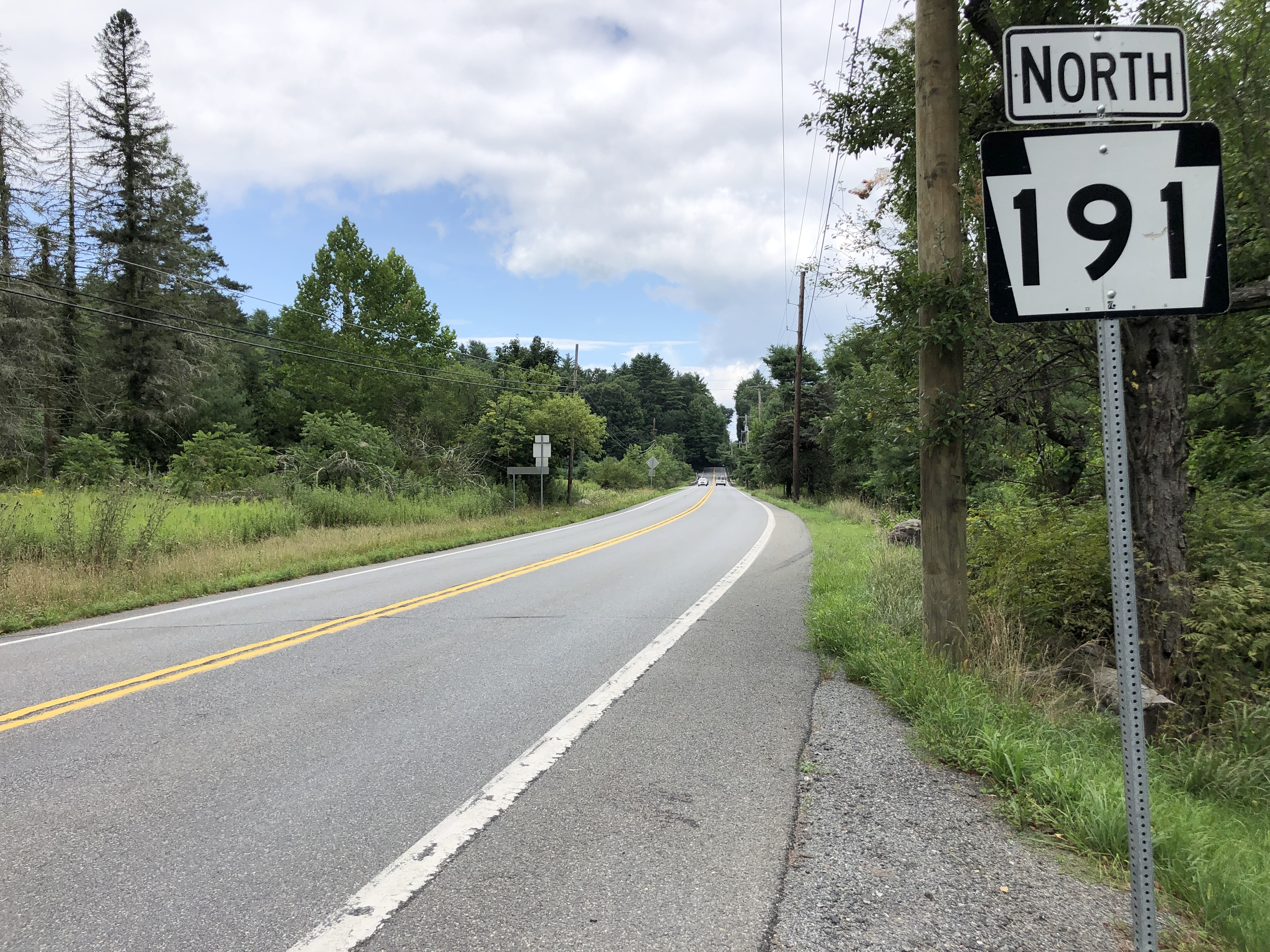
PA 191 northbound in Paradise Township

As of 2013, there were 57.13 miles (91.94 km) of public roads in Paradise Township, of which 20.27 miles (32.62 km) were maintained by the Pennsylvania Department of Transportation (PennDOT) and 36.86 miles (59.32 km) were maintained by the township.

Pennsylvania Route 191, Pennsylvania Route 314, Pennsylvania Route 390, Pennsylvania Route 611, Pennsylvania Route 715 and Pennsylvania Route 940 are the numbered highways serving Paradise Township. PA 191 follows a southeast-northwest alignment across southeastern, central and northern parts of the township. PA 314 brushes the southern edge of the township along an east-west alignment. PA 611 briefly crosses the southwestern corner of the township on a southeast-northwest alignment. PA 715 begins at PA 191 in the southeastern part of the township and heads southwestward. PA 940 begins at PA 191 in the middle of the township and heads westward. Finally, PA 390 begins at PA 940 in the western part of the township and heads northeastward to PA 191 near the northern border of the township, becoming concurrent with PA 191 as they head north out of the township.

== Government ==
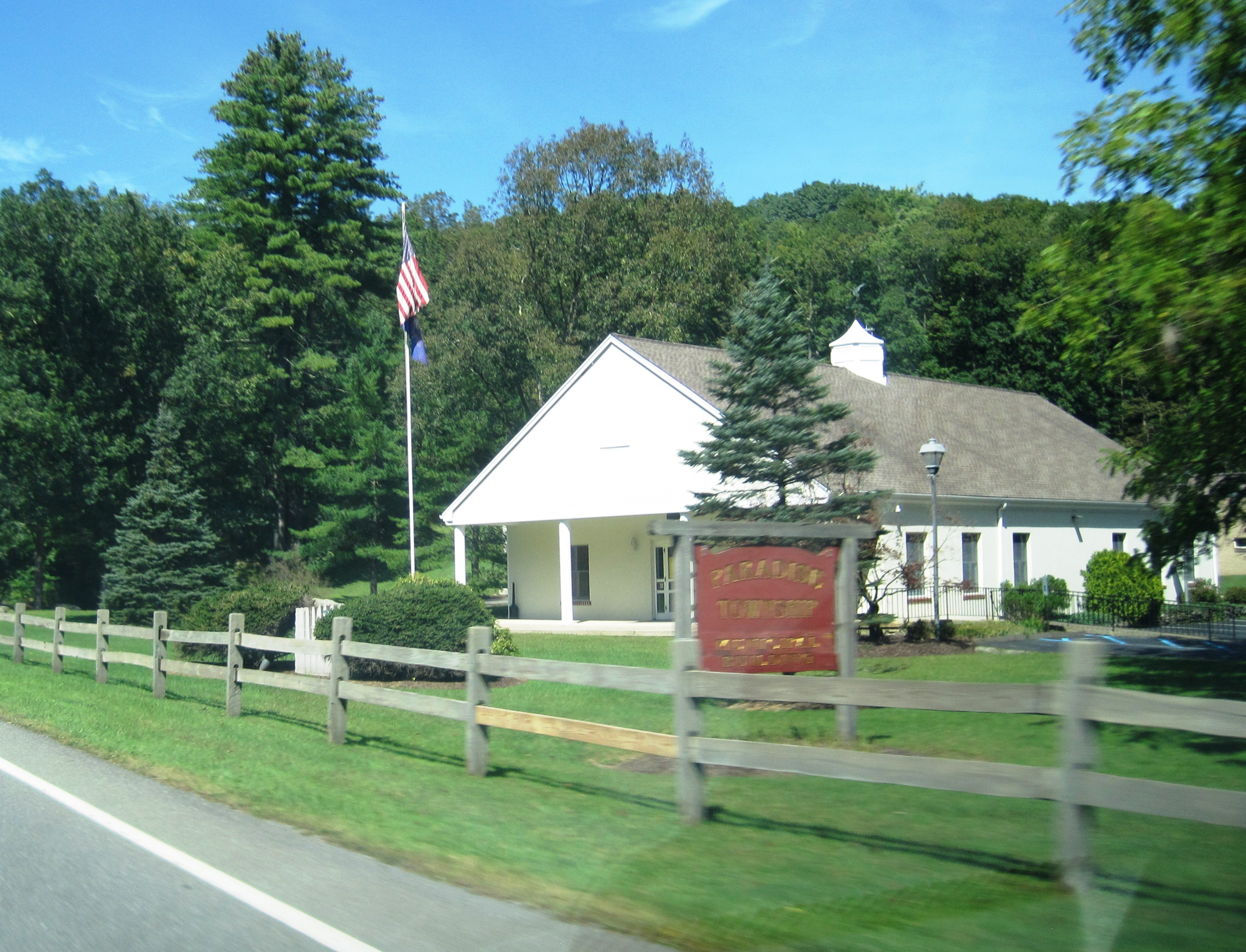
Paradise Town Hall

United States presidential election results for Paradise Township, Monroe County, Pennsylvania
Year	Republican		Democratic		Third party(ies)	
Year	No.	%	No.	%	No.	%
2024	977	56.05%	745	42.74%	21	1.20%
2020	905	53.05%	780	45.72%	21	1.23%
2016	745	51.70%	627	43.51%	69	4.79%
2012	640	46.21%	719	51.91%	26	1.88%
2008	711	47.12%	788	52.22%	10	0.66%
2004	688	50.33%	671	49.09%	8	0.59%
2000	544	49.64%	497	45.35%	55	5.02%

== Ecology ==
According to the A. W. Kuchler U.S. potential natural vegetation types, Paradise Township would have a dominant vegetation type of Appalachian Oak (104) with a dominant vegetation form of Eastern Hardwood Forest (25). The peak spring bloom typically occurs in late-April and peak fall color usually occurs in mid-October. The plant hardiness zone is 5b with an average annual extreme minimum air temperature of −10.6 °F (−24 °C).

== Education ==
The township is in the Pocono Mountain School District.

The Roman Catholic Diocese of Scranton operates area Roman Catholic schools. The diocese formerly operated Monsignor McHugh School in Paradise Township, with a Cresco address. It opened in 1961. Enrollment declined in the period circa 2015-2020 by 61%. In the 2019-2020 school year, the enrollment was 97. Had the school stayed open, only 70 students were scheduled to attend the following school year. The school closed that school year.

== Notable people ==
- Dale H. Learn, real estate agent and temperance activist.
- Rob Felicetti, bassist in alternative rock/pop punk band Bowling For Soup.
