= Tannersville, Pennsylvania =

Unincorporated community in Pennsylvania, US

- Unincorporated community
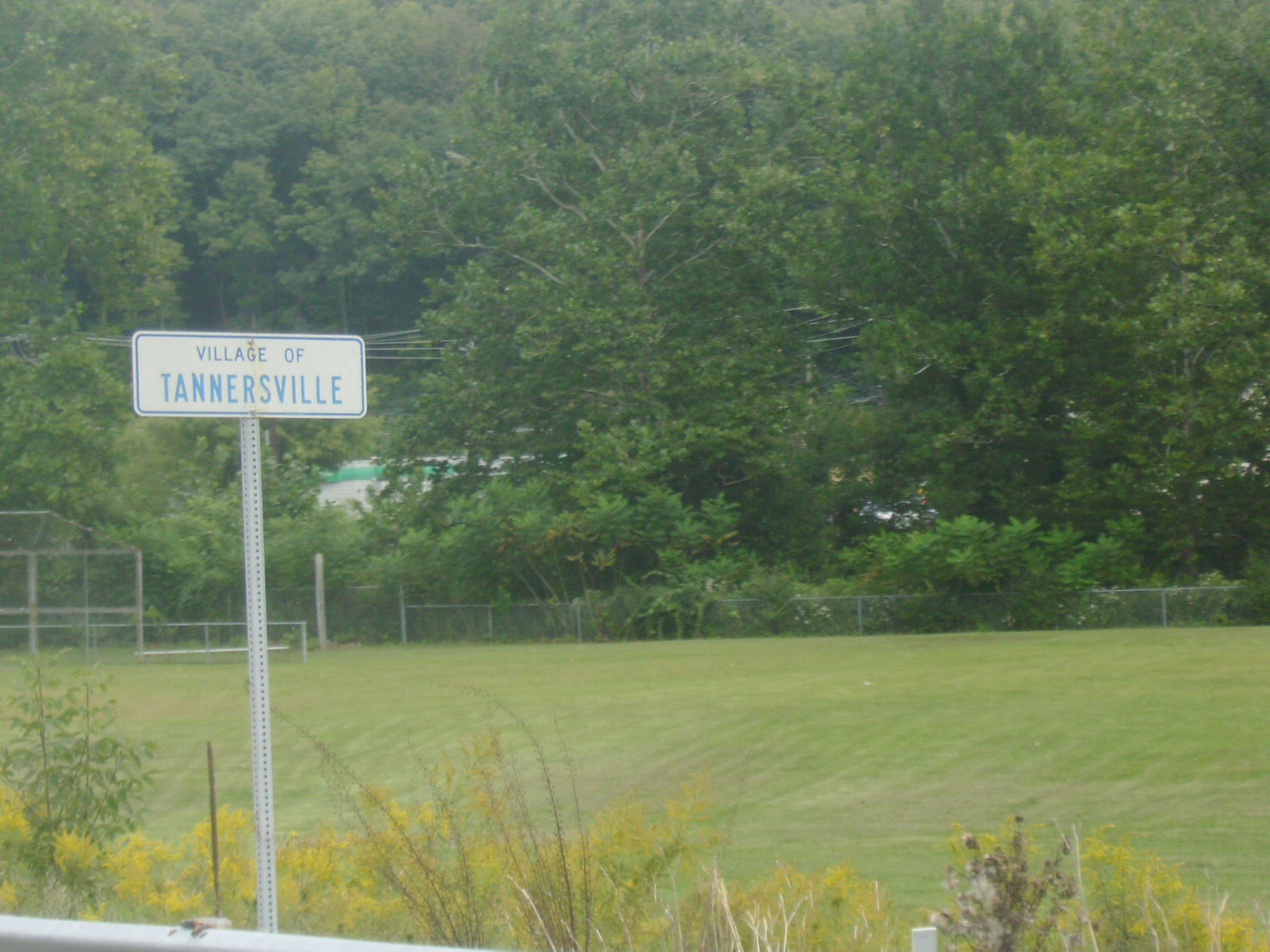
- Sign for Tannersville along PA Route 715

- Location within Pennsylvania Location within the United States
- Coordinates: 41°2′24″N 75°18′21″W
- Country: United States
- State: Pennsylvania
- County: Monroe
- Township: Pocono

Government
  - Type: Strong-Mayor council
- Elevation: 892 ft (272 m)
- Time zone: UTC-5 (Eastern (EST))
  - Summer (DST): UTC-4 (EDT)
- ZIP code: 18372
- Area codes: 570 and 272
- GNIS feature ID: 1189263

Tannersville is a village in Pocono Township, Monroe County, Pennsylvania. It is the site of the Camelback Mountain Resort, a popular ski and waterpark resort in the Pocono Mountains.

As of 2000, the population of Tannersville was 2,784. The community is served by the 629 exchange in area code 570.

== History ==
The Village of Tannersville, where the local government buildings are located, was settled in approximately 1750 by John Larner, formerly of Philadelphia, originally under the name Pocono Point.

Many native American trails located here were widened for stagecoach use, and later evolved into highways. Two of the most famous of these are the Lackawanna Trail, which is now Route 611, and runs through Tannersville and Sullivan's Trail.

Learned's Tavern, which most recently operated as The 1740 Alpine Inn but burned down in 2000, was established along the Lackawanna Trail. In 1779, it was the last building on the frontier. On June 18, 1779, General John Sullivan and his soldiers camped here. They then cut a road through the wilderness, which ultimately became present-day Sullivan's Trail.

Tannersville is currently home to the Pocono Premium Outlets.

== Geography ==
The elevation of Tannersville is 883 feet (269 m).

The village is home to the Tannersville Cranberry Bog, the southernmost boreal bog in the Eastern United States.
