= Anxious Bay =

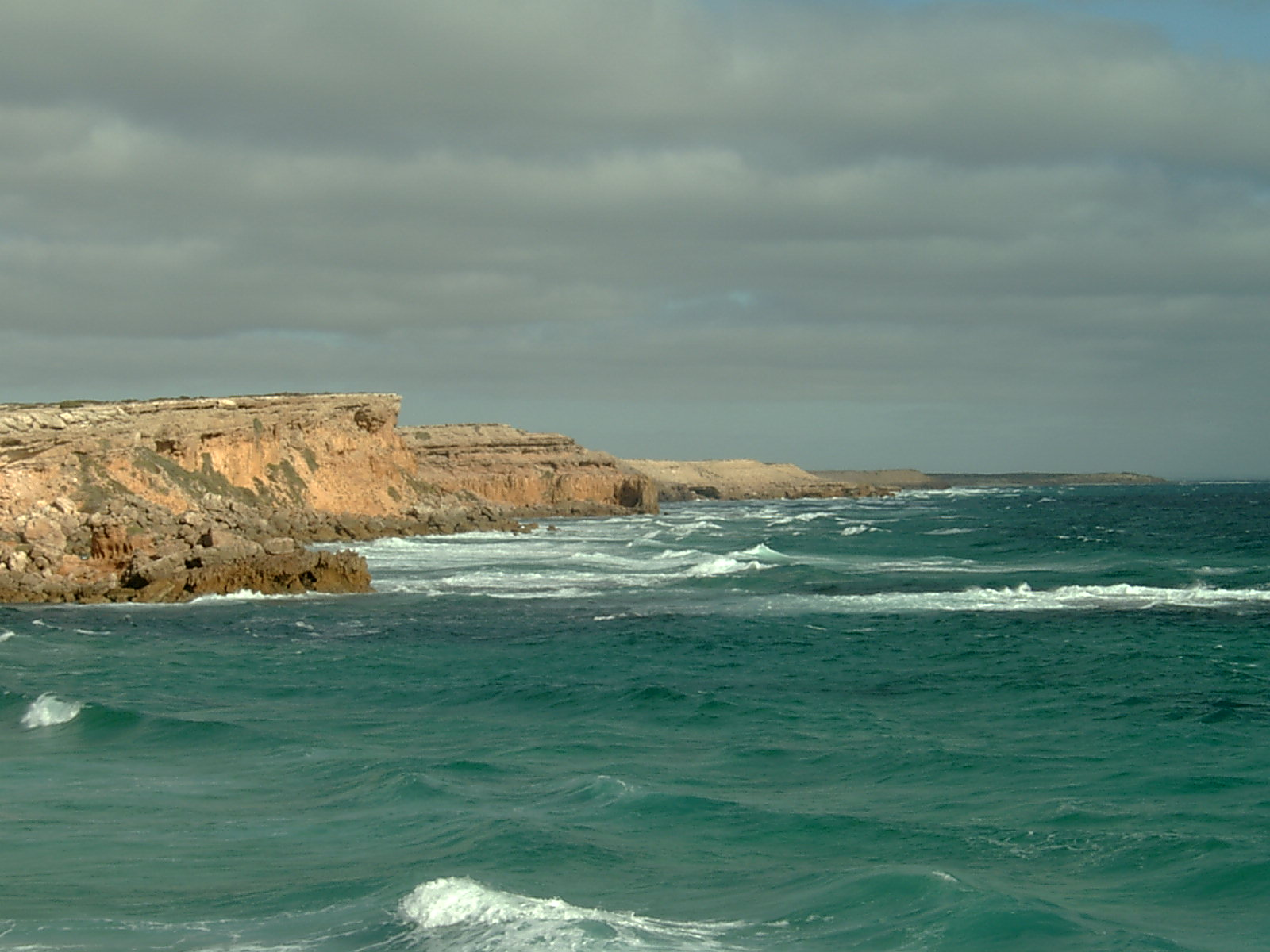
- View of Anxious Bay from mouth of Venus Bay

- Location in South Australia
- Location: Eyre Peninsula, South Australia
- Coordinates: 33°19′24″S 134°36′50″E
- Type: Bay
- Basin countries: Australia
- Max. length: 66 km (41 mi).
- Max. width: 21 km (13 mi)
- Max. depth: 58 m (190 ft)
- Islands: Waldegrave Island; Jones Island; Unnamed island, Baird Bay
- Settlements: Venus Bay; Baird Bay

Anxious Bay is a bay in the Australian state of South Australia located on the west coast of Eyre Peninsula about 275 kilometres (171 miles) west north-west of Adelaide. It was named by Matthew Flinders on 21 February 1802. It is one of four ‘historic bays' located on the South Australian coast.

== Extent & description ==
Anxious Bay lies between Cape Radstock and Cape Finniss on the west coast of Eyre Peninsula. Anxious Bay itself is the entry point for the following minor coastal inlets from west to east – Baird Bay and Venus Bay. It is one of four bays on the South Australian coast considered by the Australian government to be a 'historic bay' under the Seas and Submerged Lands Act 1973 and proclaimed as such in 1987 and again in 2006 with the result that the mouth of the bay is on the territorial seas baseline and the waters within the bay are internal waters as per the definition used in United Nations Convention on the Law of the Sea.

== European discovery ==
Matthew Flinders named Anxious Bay on 11 February 1802.

== Ports and other settlements ==
Settlements on its shores include Venus Bay and Baird Bay. A third settlement, Port Kenny is accessible via the body of water known as Venus Bay. Both the settlements of Venus Bay and Port Kenny have port infrastructure consisting of jetties that are accessible via Venus Bay.

== Economic use ==
As of 2013, an area within the southern end of the bay located to the immediate north of Waldegrave Island has been zoned under state planning legislation for aquaculture.

== Protected areas ==
Protected areas located within and adjoining the bay's extent include:

- Conservation parks – Baird Bay Islands, Lake Newland, Venus Bay and Waldegrave Islands.
- Marine parks – West Coast Bays Marine Park.

== See also ==
- Point Weyland
