= Point Weyland =

Point Weyland South Australia
- Coordinates: 33°14′42.1″S 134°37′50.4″E
- Elevation: 89 m (292 ft)
- Location: 51 km (32 mi) north north-west of Elliston

Point Weyland is a headland located on the west coast of Eyre Peninsula in South Australia about 4 kilometres (2.5 miles) west south-west of the town of Venus Bay and about 51 kilometres (32 miles) north north-west of the town of Elliston. The point which is located within Anxious Bay is the southern extremity of the opening to Venus Bay. The point is described by one source as being "a conspicuous cliffy point, 89 m (292 ft) high, stands close S[outh] W[est] of the entrance of Venus Bay" and "rises to a height of 96 m (315 ft), close N[orth] and slopes inland toward Venus Bay". It was named by Matthew Flinders on 10 February 1802. The point has been within the boundary of the Venus Bay Conservation Park since 1977 while the waters adjoining its shoreline have been within a habitat protection zone in the West Coast Bays Marine Park since 2012.
