= Jones Island (South Australia) =

Island in South Australia

- Location within South Australia

Geography
- Location: Great Australian Bight
- Coordinates: 33°11′05″S 134°21′59″E
- Area: 8 ha (20 acres)

Administration
- Australia

Jones Island is an island in the Australian state of South Australia located at the mouth of Baird Bay in the north end of Anxious Bay about 45 kilometres (28 miles) south-southeast of the town of Streaky Bay on the west coast of Eyre Peninsula. The island is notable as a breeding site for Australian sea lions and Australian pelicans. The island has enjoyed protected area status since 1967 and as of 1972, it has been part of the Baird Bay Islands Conservation Park.

== Description ==
Jones Island is an island located at the northern end of Anxious Bay at the mouth of Baird Bay about 3.8 kilometres (2.4 miles) south of the town of Baird Bay and about 45 kilometres (28 miles) south-southeast of the town of Streaky Bay on the west coast of Eyre Peninsula in South Australia. The island is about 600 metres (2,000 feet) long with a maximum width of 400 metres (1,300 feet). The island is reported as having a perimeter consisting of “sharp cliffs” to its south eastern coast which is exposed to the ocean and a “ledge” on its sheltered north western side. Access to the island is reported as being weather dependent due to the absence of a suitable landing point (i.e. beach or inlet) on its sheltered side and the presence of adverse sea conditions caused by waves diffracted around its shoreline.

== Formation, geology and oceanography ==
Jones Island was formed about 6000 years ago following the rise of sea levels at the start of the Holocene. Jones Island consists of a calcarenite layer over a granite base. It is reported as being the remnant of a “calcarenite wall that once held back the ocean from the low-lying valley to the north”. Jones Island is the permanently exposed part of a submerged reef system extending from the southern headland of Baird Bay across the south side of the mouth of the bay in a south-southwest direction for a distance of about 12 kilometres (7.5 miles).

== Flora and fauna ==
=== Flora ===
A survey carried out during 1983 on Jones Island found that its vegetation consisted of the following five groupings: coast daisy-bush, nitre-bush, Austral stork's bill, introduced pasture mainly on the north western side of the island and round-leaved pigface.

=== Fauna ===
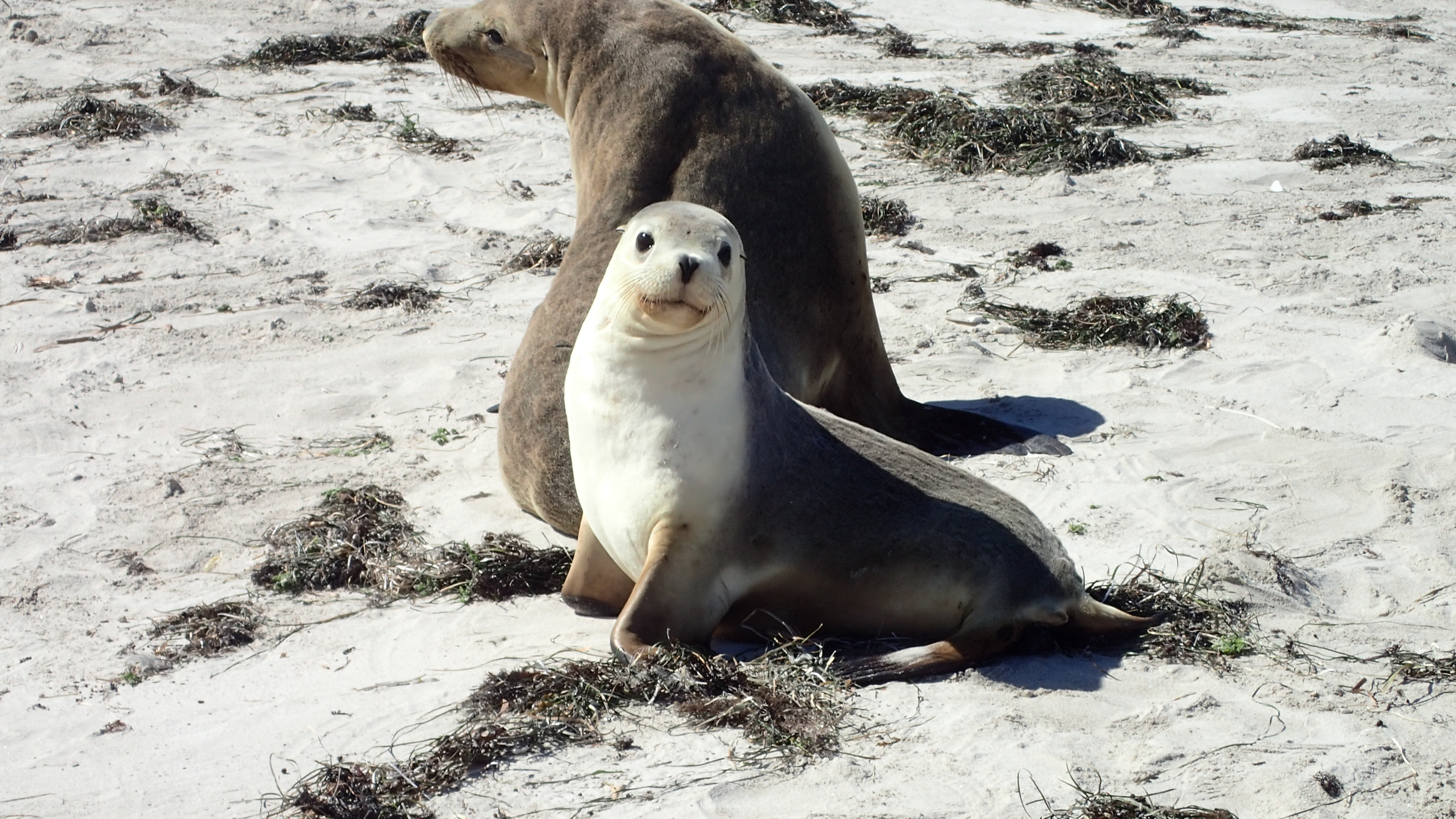
Australian sea lion mother and cub

Vertebrate animals are represented by mammals, birds and reptiles. As of 1996, mammals are represented exclusively by the Australian sea lion which uses the island both as a haul out and as a breeding colony. As of 2006, the following bird species have been observed on the island: white-faced heron, sooty oystercatcher, welcome swallow, silver gull, little grassbird, rock parrot, osprey, Australian pelican, black cormorant, black-faced cormorant, willie wagtail, crested tern, common starling, and masked plover. While most of the bird species are reported as using the island as a roost, the Australian pelican also uses it as a breeding colony. As of 2006, only one species of reptile, the bull skink, has been observed.

== History ==
=== European discovery and use ===
Jones Island is one of the islands off the west coast of Eyre Peninsula where native vegetation was cleared for “grazing by early pastoralists”. The island was named in 1908 after James W. Jones, secretary to the Commissioner of Public Works and (briefly) Premier of South Australia, Sir Richard Butler.

== Protected areas status ==
Jones Island first received protected area status along with the unnamed island in Baird Bay as a fauna conservation reserve declared under the Crown Lands Act 1929-1966 on 16 March 1967. Since 1972, it has been part of the Baird Bay Islands Conservation Park. Since 2012, the waters adjoining the shoreline of Jones Island are in a habitat protection zone within the West Coast Bays Marine Park. The island is also located at the south eastern boundary of an area which covers the full extent of Baird Bay and which has been listed since at least 1996 as a "wetland of national importance" in the Directory of Important Wetlands in Australia.

== See also ==
- List of islands of Australia

== Citations and references ==
=== References ===
- South Australia. Department of Marine and Harbors (DMH) (1985), The Waters of South Australia a series of charts, sailing notes and coastal photographs, Dept. of Marine and Harbors, South Australia, ISBN 978-0-7243-7603-2
- Royal Australian Navy (RAN) Hydrographic Service Hydrographic Department (1979). Streaky Bay to Whidbey Islands (chart no. Aus 342).
- Anon (2006). Island Parks of Western Eyre Peninsula Management Plan (PDF). Adelaide: Department for Environment and Heritage (DEH), South Australia. ISBN 1-921238-18-6.
- "West Coast Bays Marine Park Management Plan 2012" (PDF). Department of Environment Water and Natural Resources (DEWNR). 2012. p. 26/26.
- A.C., Robinson; Canty, P.; Mooney, T.; Rudduck, P. (1996). South Australia's offshore islands (PDF). Canberra: Australian Heritage Commission. ISBN 0-644350-11-3.
- Eyles, Kathy; Larmour, Geoff; Young, Sarah; Australia. Environment Australia; Natural Heritage Trust (Australia). National Wetlands Program (2001), A Directory of important wetlands in Australia (PDF) (3rd ed.), Environment Australia, ISBN 978-0-642-54721-7
- "Australian Wetlands Database - Directory Wetland Information Sheet: Baird Bay - SA004". Commonwealth of Australia, Department of the Environment (DOE). 10 May 2010.
