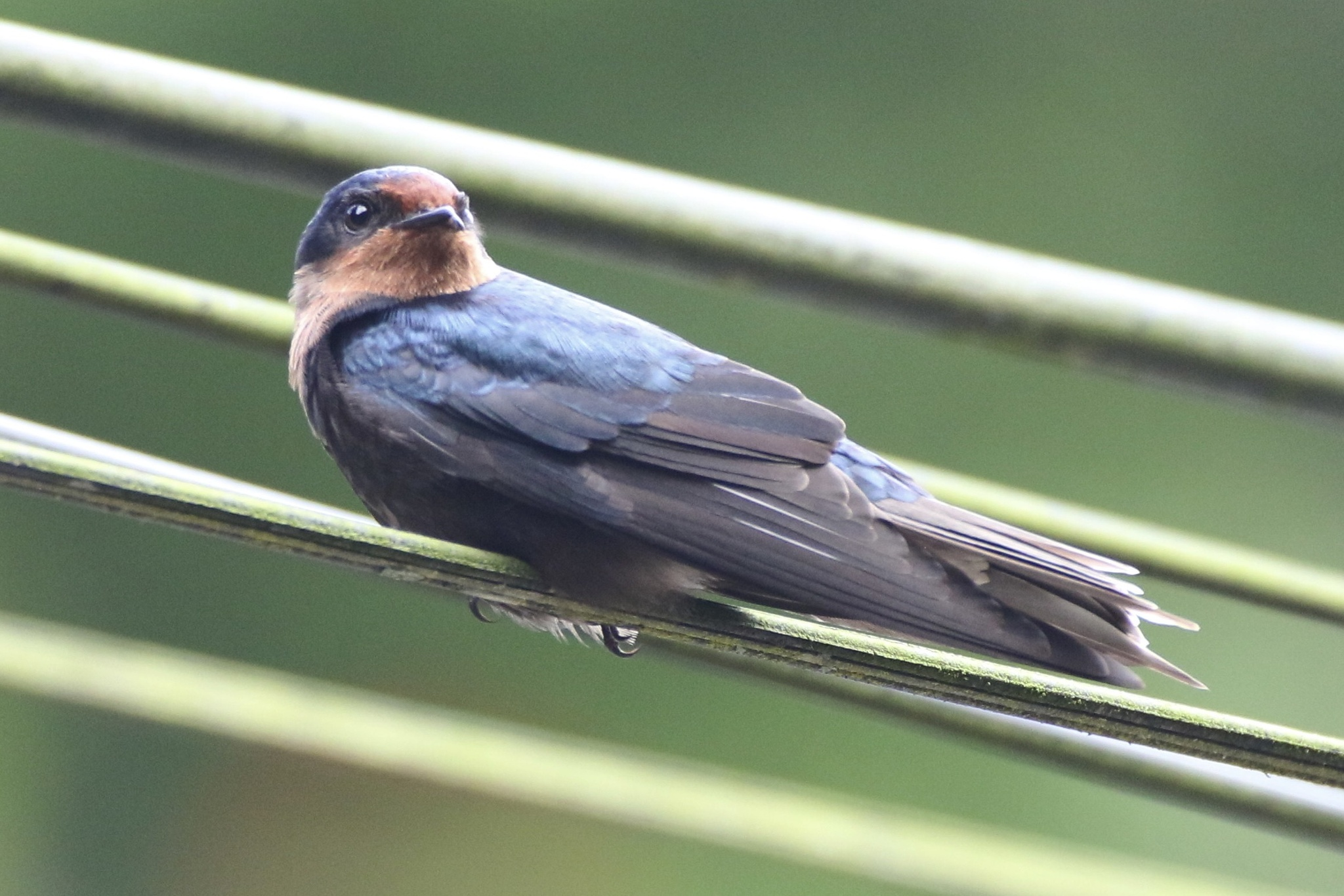

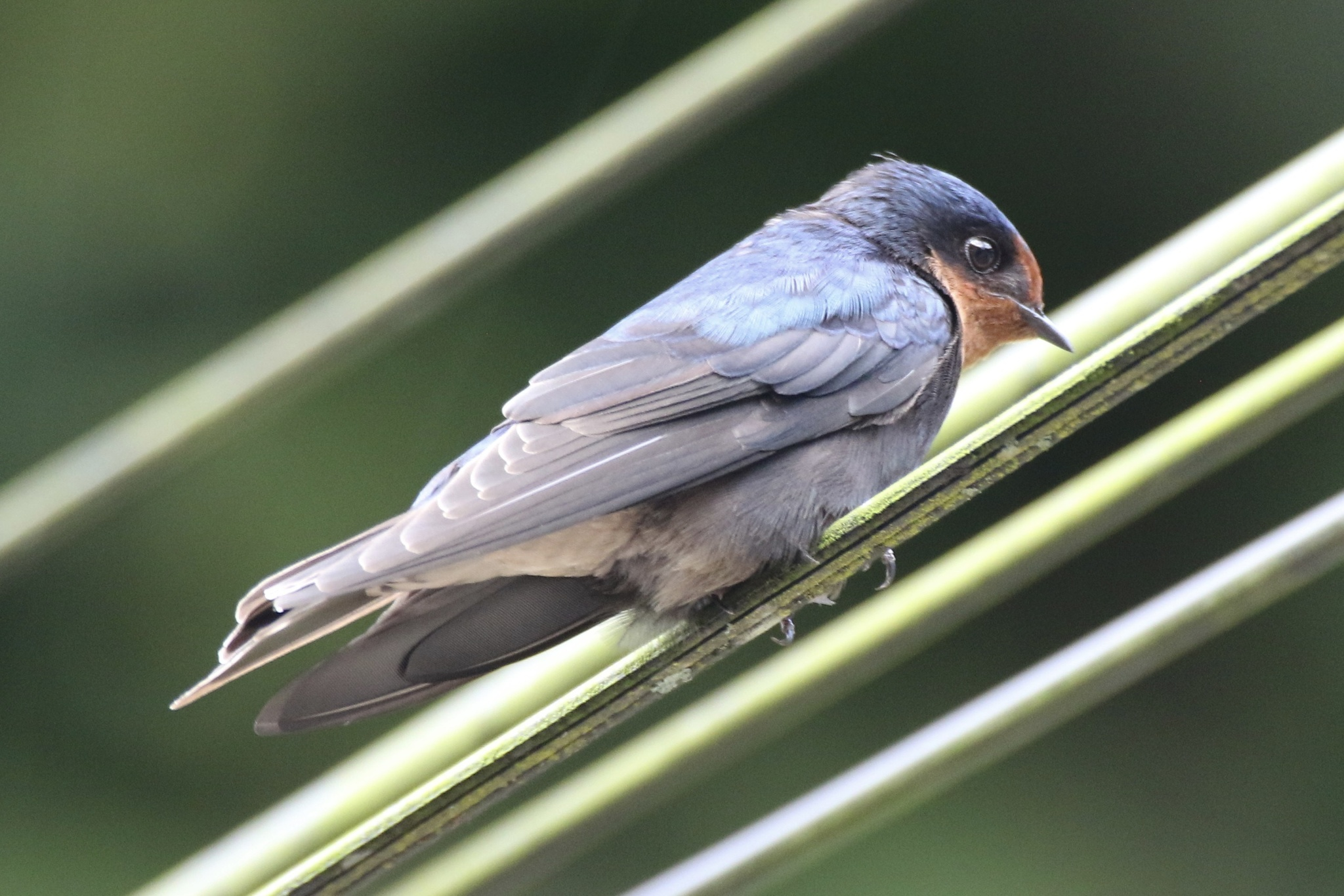

Conservation status
- Least Concern (IUCN 3.1)

Scientific classification
- Kingdom: Animalia
- Phylum: Chordata
- Class: Aves
- Order: Passeriformes
- Family: Hirundinidae
- Genus: Hirundo
- Species: H. tahitica

Binomial name
- Hirundo tahitica Gmelin, 1789

= Tahiti swallow =

Species of bird

The Tahiti swallow (Hirundo tahitica) is a small passerine bird in the swallow family Hirundinidae. It is found on the islands of Moorea and Tahiti in French Polynesia. It was formerly considered to be conspecific with the Pacific swallow.

== Taxonomy ==
The Tahiti swallow was formally described in 1789 by the German naturalist Johann Friedrich Gmelin in his revised and expanded edition of Carl Linnaeus's Systema Naturae. He placed it with the swallows in the genus Hirundo and coined the binomial name Hirundo tahitica. Gmelin based his entry on the "Otaheite swallow" that had been described and illustrated in 1783 by the English ornithologist John Latham in his book A General Synopsis of Birds. The Tahiti swallow was formerly treated as conspecific with the Pacific swallow (Hirundo javanica). The species were split based on the differences in morphology. The Tahiti swallow is monotypic: no subspecies are recognised.

== Description ==
This species is a small swallow at 13 cm (5.1 in) in length. It has a blue-black back and crown with browner wings and tail, a red face and throat, and dusky underparts. It differs from the barn swallow and the closely related welcome swallow in its shorter and less forked tail.

== Behaviour ==
The Tahiti swallow builds a neat cup-shaped nest, constructed with mud pellets collected in the beak, under a cliff ledge or on man-made structures such as a building, bridge or tunnel. The nest is lined with softer material, and the clutch is two to three eggs. It is similar in behaviour to other aerial insectivores, such as other swallows and the unrelated swifts. It is a fast flyer and feeds on insects, especially flies, while airborne.
