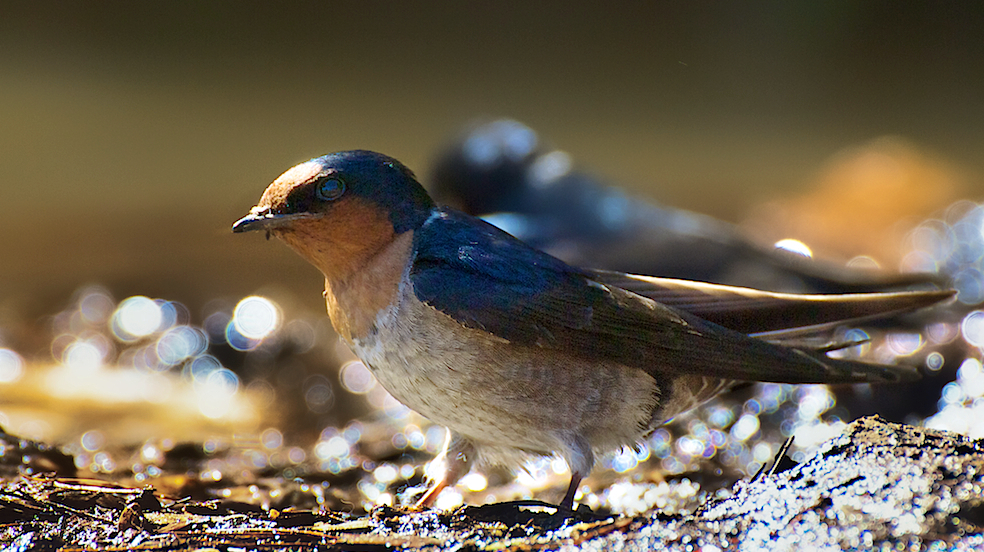
- In the hills of southern India

Scientific classification
- Kingdom: Animalia
- Phylum: Chordata
- Class: Aves
- Order: Passeriformes
- Family: Hirundinidae
- Genus: Hirundo
- Species: H. domicola

Binomial name
- Hirundo domicola Jerdon, 1841

= Hill swallow =

Species of bird

The hill swallow (Hirundo domicola) is a small passerine bird in the swallow family. It breeds in southern India and Sri Lanka. It is resident apart from some local seasonal movements. This bird is associated with coasts, but is increasingly spreading to forested uplands. It was formerly considered to be a subspecies of the Pacific swallow.

== Description ==
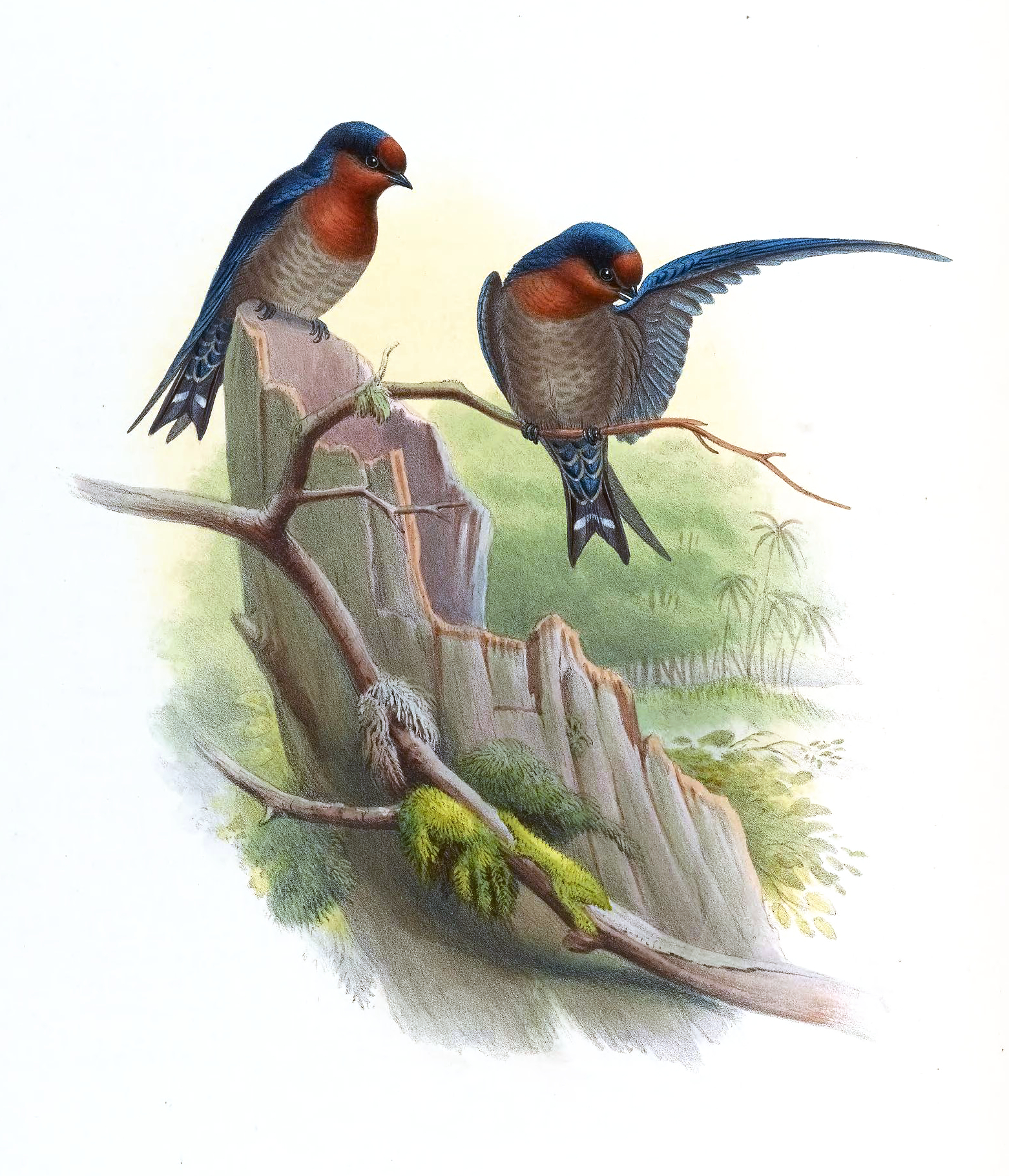

This species is a small swallow at 13 cm (5.1 in). It has a blue back with browner wings and tail, a red face and throat, and dusky underparts. It differs from the barn swallow and the closely related welcome swallow in its shorter and less forked tail.

== Behaviour ==
=== Reproduction ===
The hill swallow builds a neat cup-shaped nest, constructed with mud pellets collected in the beak, under a cliff ledge or on man-made structures such as a building, bridge or tunnel. The nest is lined with softer material, and the clutch is up to four eggs. Detailed studies on the breeding ecology of the species were conducted in Silent Valley National Park and Muthikkulam reserve forests of Kerala.

=== Feeding ===
It is similar in behaviour to other aerial insectivores, such as other swallows and the unrelated swifts. It is a fast flyer and feeds on insects, especially flies, while airborne.

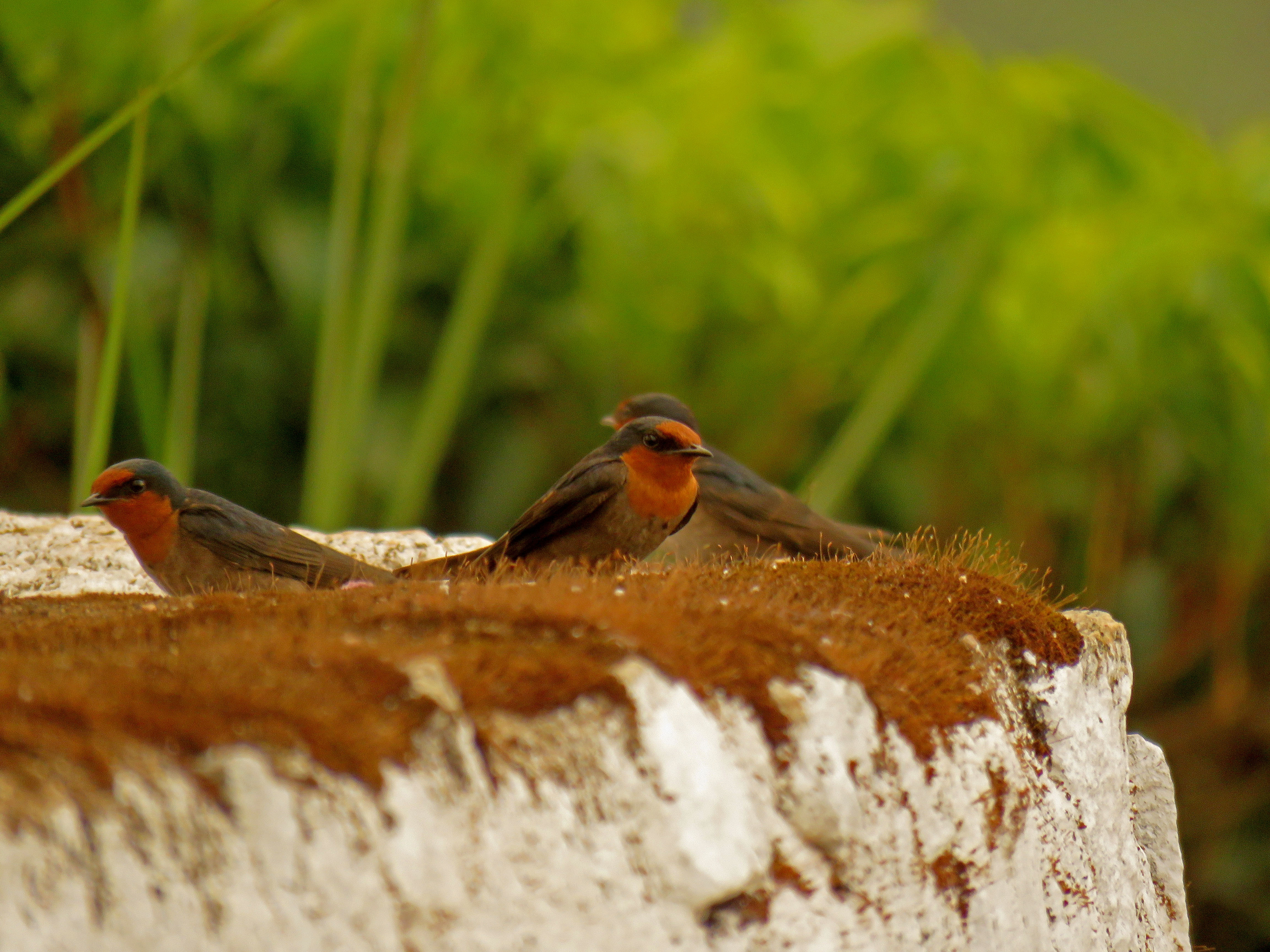
Hill swallow
