= Unnamed Island, Baird Bay =

Island in South Australia

Unnamed Island
- Location within South Australia

Geography
- Location: Great Australian Bight
- Coordinates: 33°04′52″S 134°17′04″E
- Area: 13 ha (32 acres)

Administration
- Australia

Unnamed island (also identified as Section 181, Hundred Wrenfordsley, County Robinson) is an island located in South Australia within Baird Bay about 32 kilometres (20 miles) south by west of the town of Streaky Bay on the west coast of Eyre Peninsula. The island has enjoyed protected area status since 1967 and it has been part of the Baird Bay Islands Conservation Park since 1972.

== Description ==
The unnamed island in Baird Bay is an island located at the northern end of Baird Bay about 10 kilometres (6.2 miles) north-west of the town of Baird Bay and about 32 kilometres (20 miles) south by west of the town of Streaky Bay on the west coast of Eyre Peninsula in South Australia. The island consists of a calcarenite platform which slopes via a "compacted scree" to a beach that surrounds the island on all sides apart from the south side where wave action has formed a ledge. The island is connected to the mainland by a spit which dries at "extreme low tide" to form a means of access to the island.

== Formation, geology and oceanography ==
The island was formed about 6,000 years ago following the rise of sea levels at the start of the Holocene. The island consists of an exposed calcarenite layer. The waters surrounding the island are less than 5 metres (16 feet) in depth.

== Flora and fauna ==
=== Flora ===
During 1979, the island was surveyed as part of a study to determine the feasibility of introducing, brush-tailed bettong, a native mammal. The survey found two distinct vegetation communities that covered the island's platform in "roughly equal proportions" - one being a "low shrubland dominated by umbrella bush" and the other being a "more open grassland." Thirty-nine plant species were found to be present including sticky hop-bush, shore westringia, black-anther flax lily, Australian hollyhock, various speargrass species and introduced species such as bearded oat.

=== Fauna ===
Vertebrate animals are represented by mammals, birds and reptiles. Mammals are represented by three introduced species - house mouse, European rabbit (skeletal remains) and red fox (tracks observed). While no native species has been reported as being observed on the island, a group of ten brush-tailed bettong were released onto the island in 1982, as part of a program to support that critically endangered species. This group grew to a stable population of 20, which was destroyed in 1994 by an apparently fox-like animal which had crossed from the mainland to the island. As of 2006, the following bird species have been observed on the island: Australian pelican, black-faced cuckooshrike, double-banded plover, fairy tern, little egret, osprey, pied cormorant, pied oystercatcher, red-capped plover, Richard's pipit, singing honeyeater, silver gull, sooty oystercatcher stubble quail, swamp harrier, welcome swallow and white-bellied sea eagle. As of 2006, reptiles were represented by bull skink and marbled gecko.

== History ==
=== European use ===
As of 2012, the island has no official name and is identified in two sources by the cadastral description, "Section 181, Hundred Wrenfordsley, County of Robinson." One of the above-mentioned sources used the name "Baird Bay Island" in order to distinguish it from other unnamed islands discussed within its content. It is one of the islands off the west coast of Eyre Peninsula where native vegetation was cleared for "grazing by early pastoralists". Contemporary use of the island as of 1996 was reported as follows: "A small stone hut has been built into a section of coastal cliff and was possibly built and used by fishermen, and a limestone chimney is all that remains of a small house that once stood on the island."

== Protected area status ==
The island first received protected area status along with Jones Island as a fauna conservation reserve declared under the Crown Lands Act 1929-1966 on 16 March 1967 . Since 1972, it has been part of the Baird Bay Islands Conservation Park. Since 2012, the waters adjoining its shoreline are in a habitat protection zone within the West Coast Bays Marine Park. The island is also located within an area in Baird Bay which has been listed since at least 1996 as a "wetland of national importance" in the Directory of Important Wetlands in Australia.

== See also ==
- List of islands of Australia

== Citations and references ==
=== References ===
- Baker, J.L (2004). Towards a System of Ecologically Representative Marine Protected Areas in South Australian Marine Bioregions - Technical Report. Part 2 (PDF). Department for Environment and Heritage, South Australia.
- Anon (2006). Island Parks of Western Eyre Peninsula Management Plan (PDF). Adelaide: Department for Environment and Heritage (DEH), South Australia. ISBN 1-921238-18-6.
- "West Coast Bays Marine Park Management Plan 2012" (PDF). Department of Environment Water and Natural Resources (DEWNR). 2012. p. 26/26.
- Robinson, A. C.; Canty, P.; Mooney, T.; Rudduck, P. (1996). South Australia's offshore islands (PDF). Canberra: Australian Heritage Commission. ISBN 0-644350-11-3. Archived from the original (PDF) on 7 March 2016.
- Eyles, Kathy; Larmour, Geoff; Young, Sarah; Australia. Environment Australia; Natural Heritage Trust (Australia). National Wetlands Program (2001), A Directory of important wetlands in Australia (PDF) (3rd ed.), Environment Australia, ISBN 978-0-642-54721-7
- "Australian Wetlands Database - Directory Wetland Information Sheet: Baird Bay - SA004". Commonwealth of Australia, Department of the Environment (DOE). 10 May 2010.
- Woinarski, J.; Burbidge, A.A. (2016). "Bettongia penicillata". IUCN Red List of Threatened Species. 2016 e.T2785A21961347. doi:10.2305/IUCN.UK.2016-2.RLTS.T2785A21961347.en.
- Royal Australian Navy (RAN) Hydrographic Service, Hydrographic Department (1979). Streaky Bay to Whidbey Islands (chart no. Aus 342).
