= Fledge =

Stage of a flying animal's life

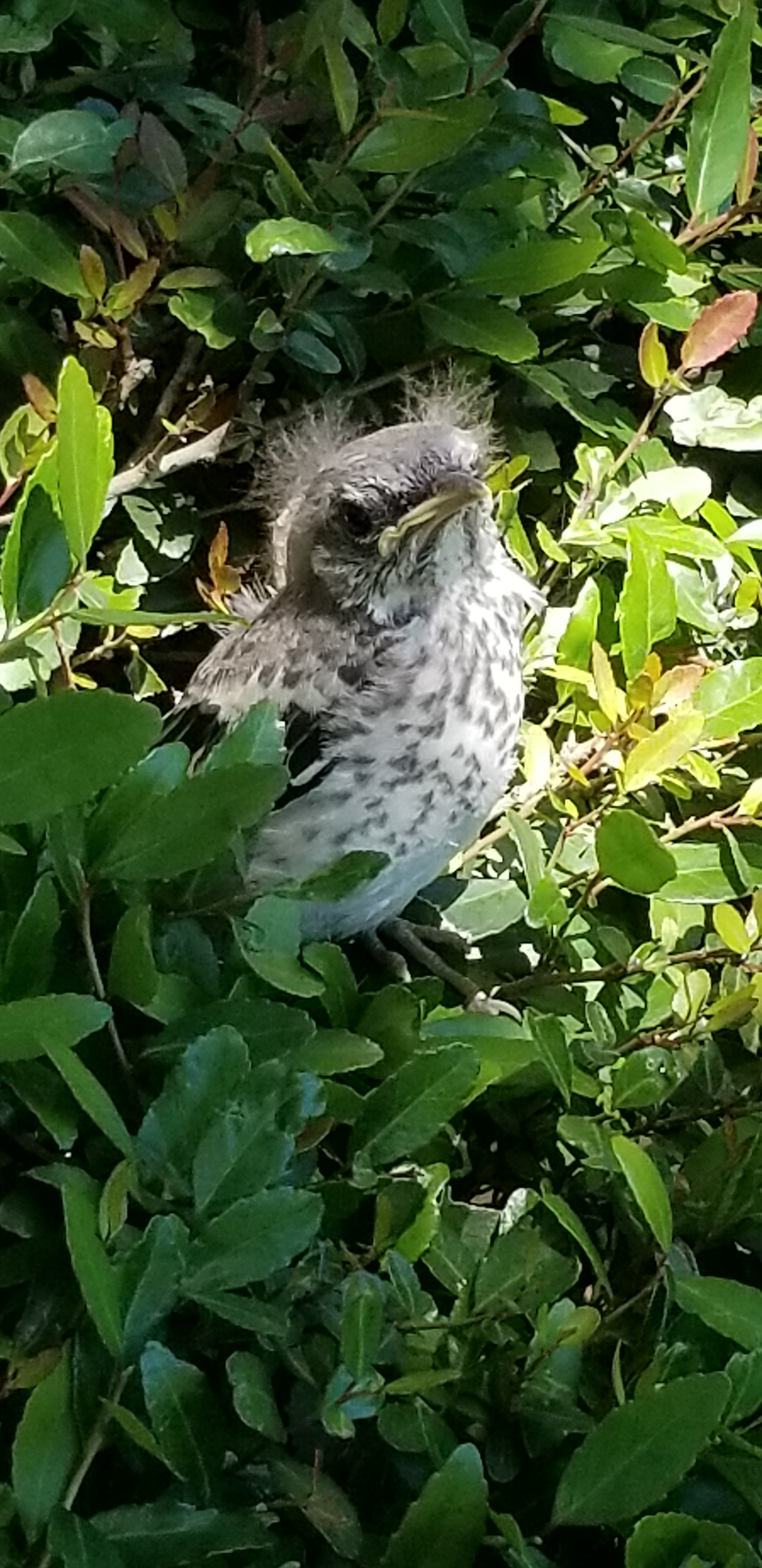
Fledging stage of the northern mockingbird (Mimus polyglottos)

Fledging is the stage in a flying animal's life between hatching or birth and becoming capable of flight. This term is most frequently applied to birds, but is also used for species of bats. For altricial birds, those that spend more time in a vulnerable condition in the nest, the nestling and fledging stage can be the same. For precocial birds, those that develop and leave the nest quickly, a short nestling stage precedes a longer fledging stage.

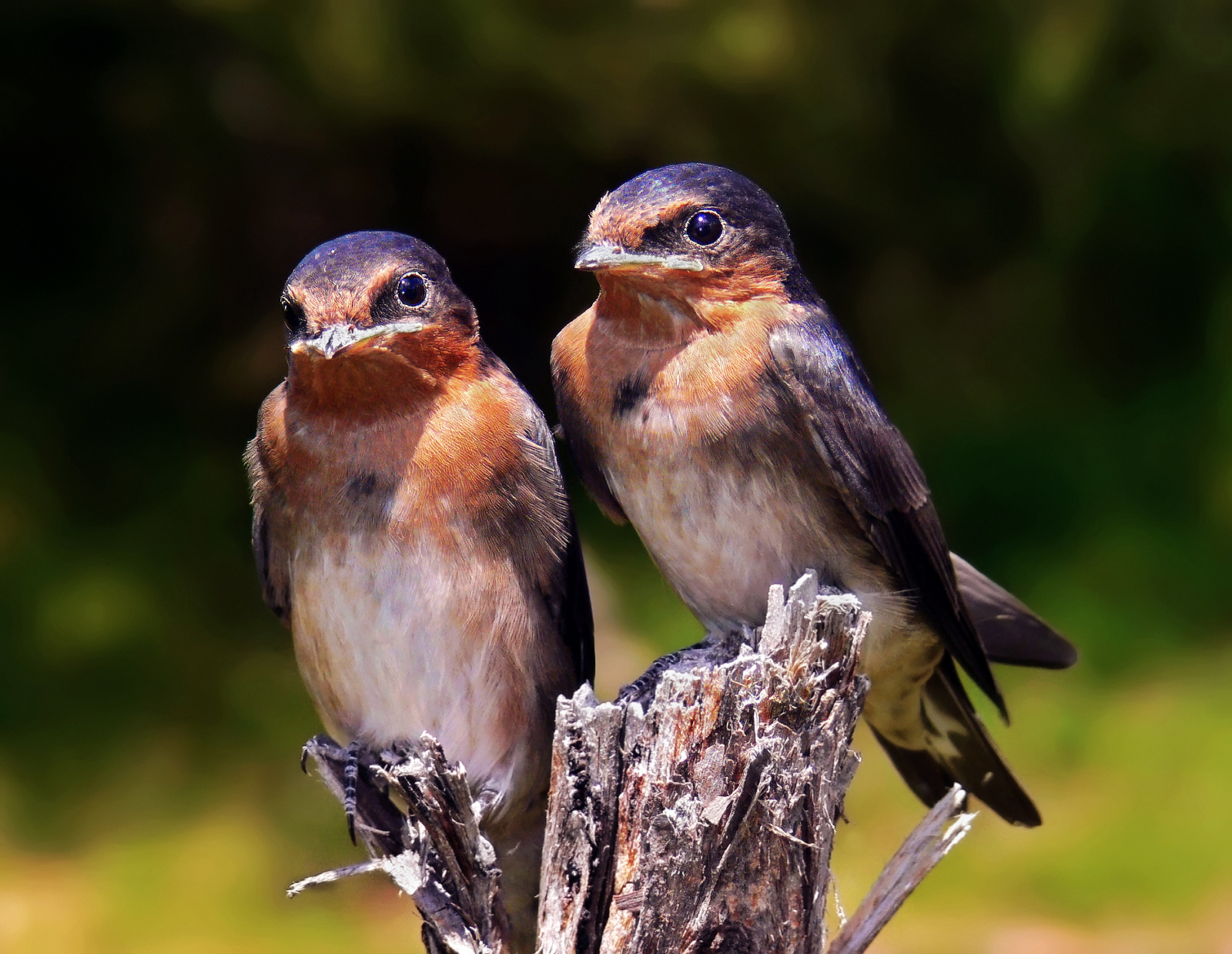
A pair of welcome swallow chicks, Hirundo neoxena, taken the day after they fledged.

All birds are considered to have fledged when the feathers and wing muscles are sufficiently developed for flight. A young bird that has recently fledged but is still dependent upon parental care and feeding is called a fledgling. People often want to help fledglings, as they appear vulnerable, but it is best to leave them alone. The USA National Phenology Network defines the phenophase (or life cycle stage) of fledged young for birds as "One or more young are seen recently departed from the nest. This includes young incapable of sustained flight and young which are still dependent on adults."

In many species, parents continue to care for their fledged young, either by feeding them or leading them to food sources. Birds that have left the nest before they can fly are vulnerable, though once fledged their chances of survival increase dramatically.

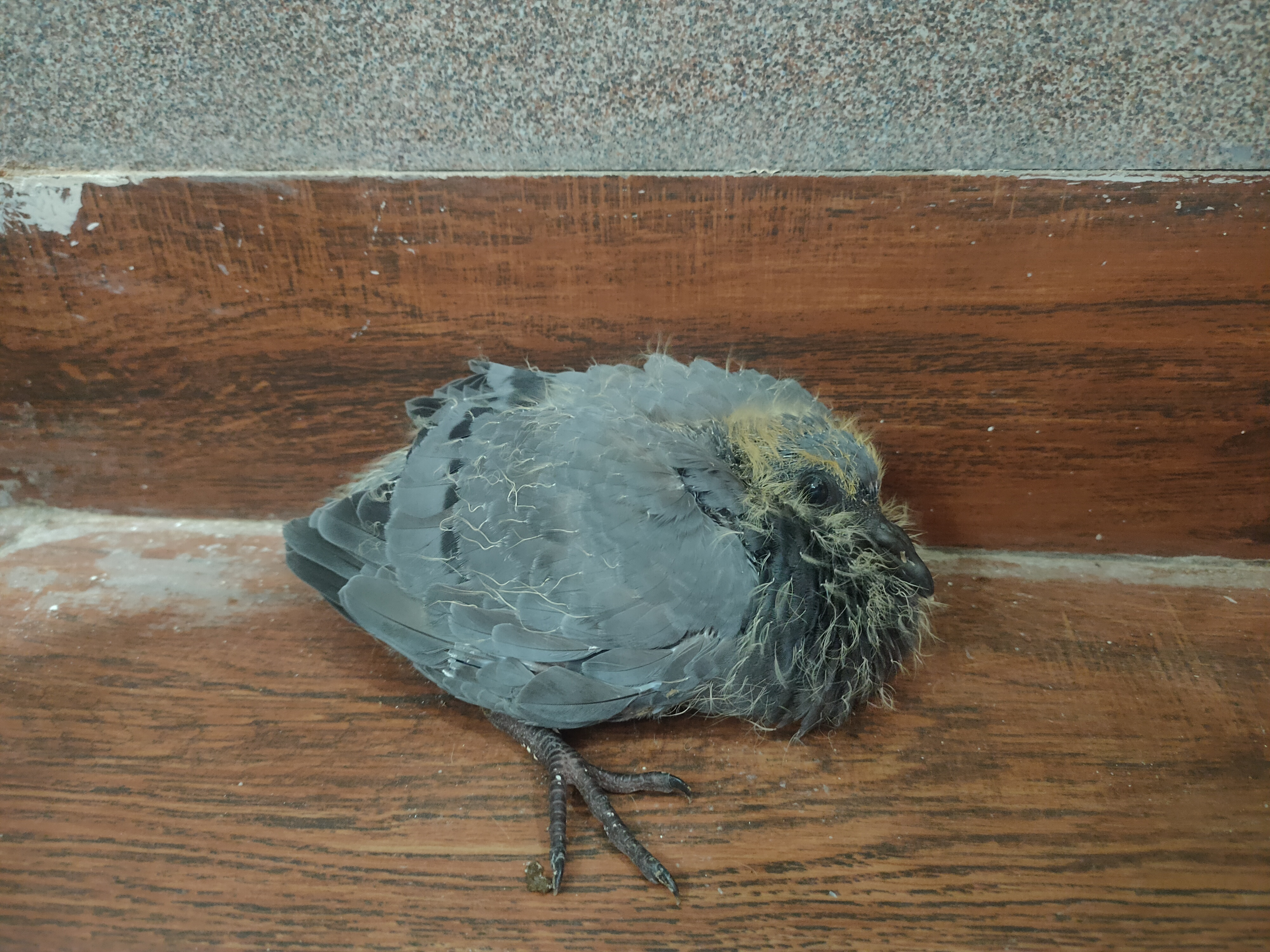
A pigeon fledgling on a tiled floor

One species, the ancient murrelet, fledges two days after hatching, running from its burrow to the ocean and its calling parents. Once it reaches the ocean, its parents care for it for several weeks. Other species, such as guillemots and terns, leave the nesting site while they are still unable to fly. The fledging behavior of the guillemot is spectacular; the adult leads the chick to the edge of the cliff, where the colony is located, and the chick will then launch itself off, attempting to fly as far as possible, before crash landing on the ocean.
