= James W. Jones =

James William Jones ISO (1843 – 26 April 1920) was a South Australian surveyor and senior public servant.

== Career ==
Jones was born in Waymouth Street, Adelaide, the son of prominent civil engineer Thomas Jones.

Thomas Jones (5 December 1809 – c. 20 November 1892) was a civil engineer born in Cowbridge in Glamorganshire, Wales, who arrived in Adelaide on 7 July 1840. He supervised construction of the City Bridge (on what is now King William Road) in 1843, the Port Elliot breakwater, and the Port Elliot to Goolwa tramway from 1853 to 1856. He remained at Port Elliot as engineer and supervisor of the tramway until 1871. He was appointed Town Surveyor for Moonta in 1872 and works supervisor for the (Yorke) Peninsula Road Board in 1875. He designed the Anglican Church in Moonta, completed 1874. He was the founder of the Manchester Unity of Oddfellows in South Australia.

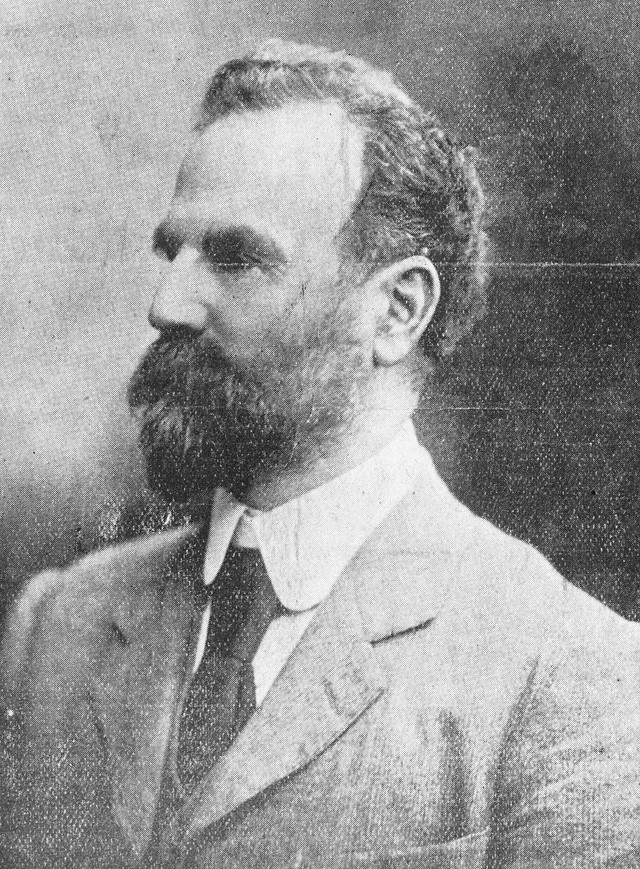

He was educated at J. L. Young's Adelaide Educational Institution, and was soon working for his father on the Port Elliot to Goolwa tramway, for which his father received official criticism. He joined the State public service as a draughtsman in 1865 and was appointed Chief Surveyor then Deputy Surveyor-General in the Department of Survey and Crown Lands. He explored the area north-east of Eucla in 1880, and discovered the Kudna rockhole and catacombs, an immense network of limestone caves, lakes and underground passages under the Nullarbor Plain. He was appointed Conservator of Water in 1887 and Secretary to the Commissioner of Works in 1902. He was secretary of the South Australia branch of the Royal Geographical Society of Australasia from its foundation in 1885 to 1894. He was elected president of the Institute of Surveyors in 1912. He was chairman and president of the Harbors and Marine Board in 1914. He was secretary of the Cheer-Up Society during the First World War. He was appointed Companion of the Imperial Service Order in 1911. His retirement in 1914 was marked by a farewell from a large congregation of fellow-officers.

== Recognition ==
- Jones Island (South Australia) was named for him.

== Bibliography ==
- Jones, James W, (1880), Examination of Country North-East of Eucla, Parliamentary Paper No 191, South Australian Government. (Includes map "Plan Shewing Country North-East of Eucla", dated 24 Sep 1880). view .pdf here
