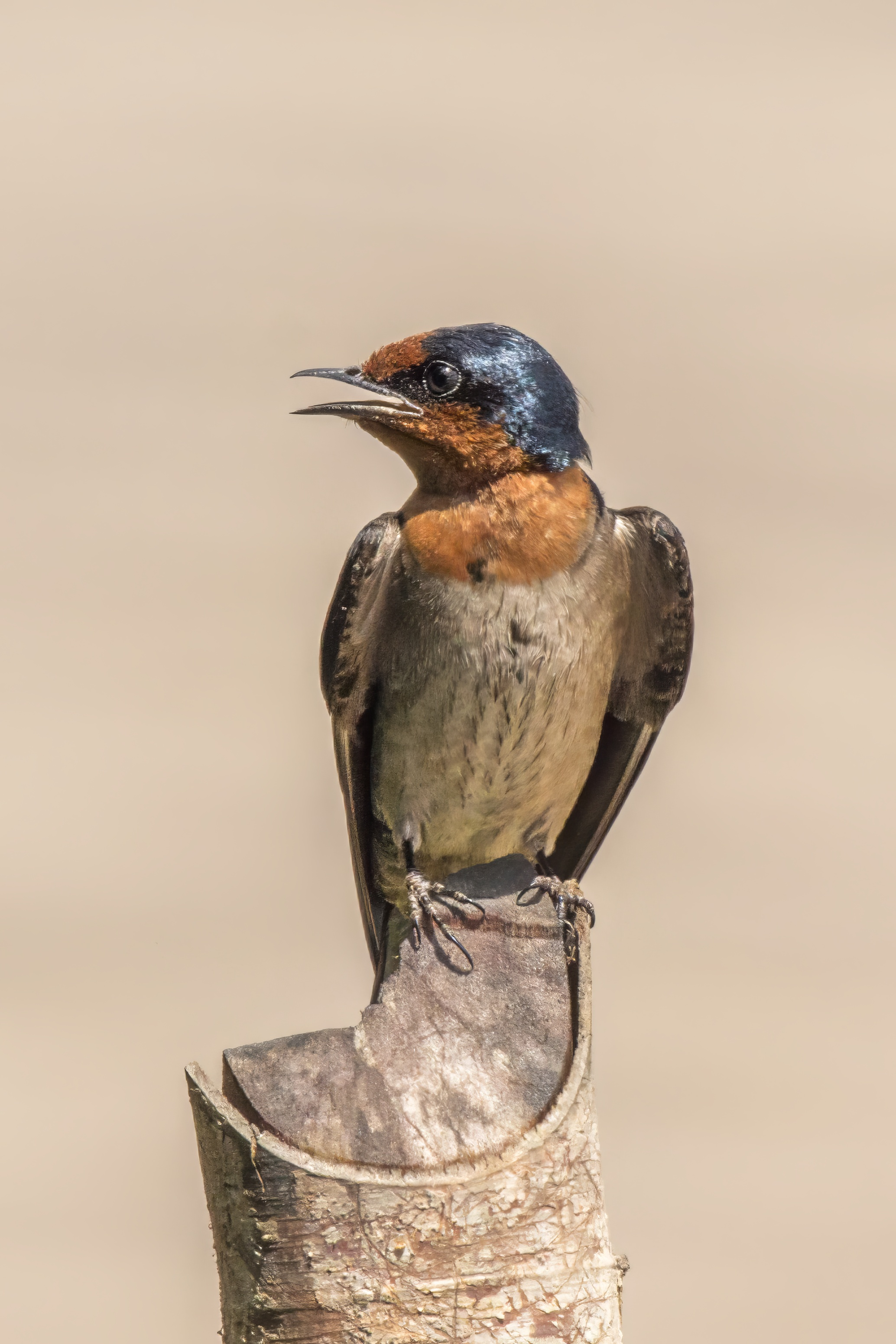
- H. t. javanica Danum Valley, Borneo

Conservation status
- Least Concern (IUCN 3.1)

Scientific classification
- Kingdom: Animalia
- Phylum: Chordata
- Class: Aves
- Order: Passeriformes
- Family: Hirundinidae
- Genus: Hirundo
- Species: H. javanica

Binomial name
- Hirundo javanica Sparrman, 1789

= Pacific swallow =

Species of bird

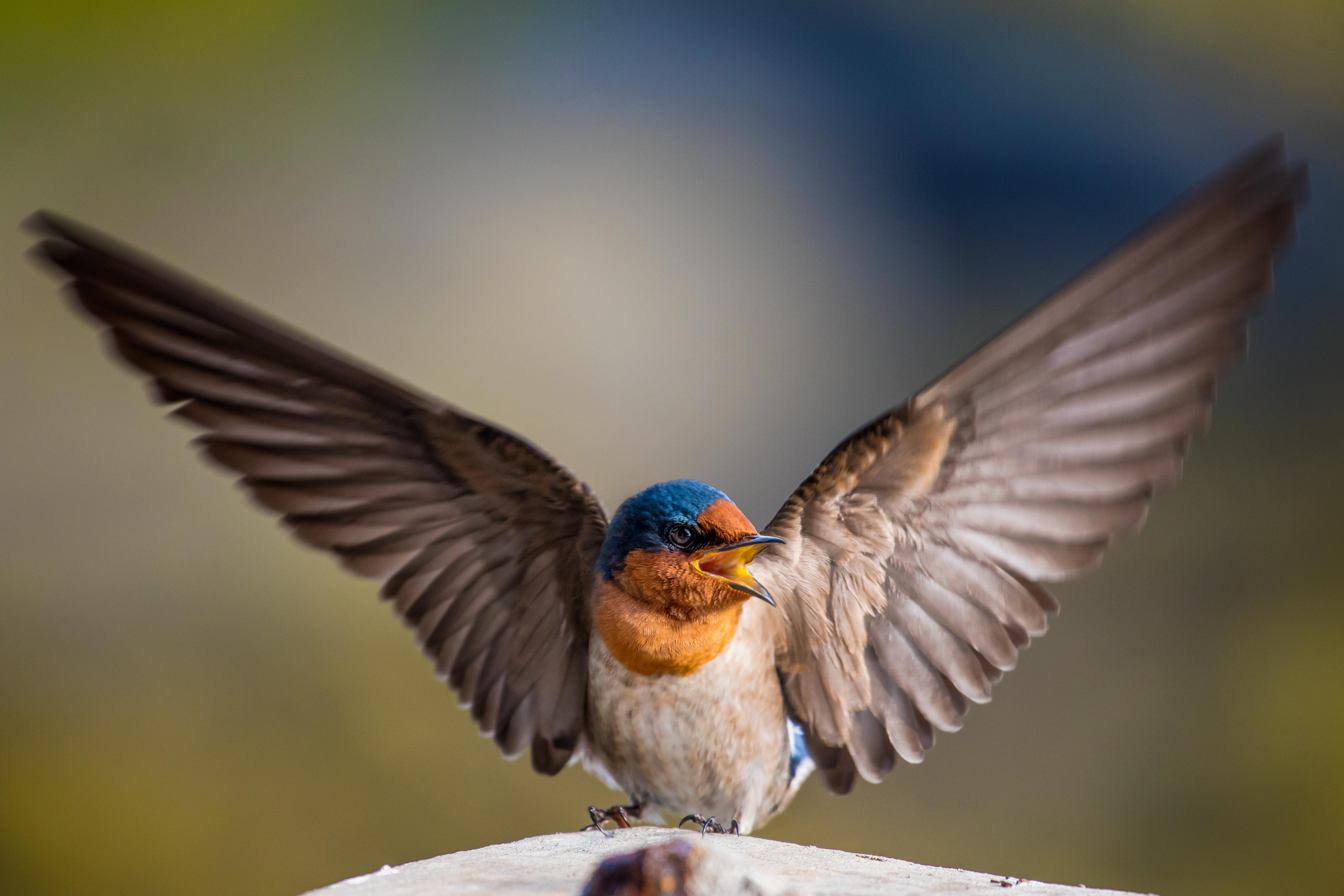
At Misamis Oriental, Philippines

The Pacific swallow (Hirundo javanica) is a small passerine bird in the swallow family Hirundinidae. It breeds in tropical southern Asia and the islands of the south Pacific. It is resident apart from some local seasonal movements. This bird is associated with coasts, but is increasingly spreading to forested uplands. It was formerly treated as conspecific with hill swallow, the welcome swallow and the Tahiti swallow.

== Taxonomy ==
The Pacific swallow was formally described and illustrated in 1789 by the Swedish naturalist Anders Sparrman based on a specimen collected on the Indonesian island of Java. He coined the binomial name Hirundo javanica. The Pacific swallow was formerly considered to be conspecific with the Tahiti swallow (Hirundo tahitica). The species were split based on the differences in morphology.

Six subspecies are recognised:

- H. j. javanica Sparrman, 1789 – south Myanmar and Andaman Islands to south Vietnam, east to Philippines and south to Moluccas and Greater and Lesser Sunda Islands
- H. j. namiyei (Stejneger, 1887) – Ryukyu Islands (south Japan) and Taiwan
- H. j. frontalis Quoy & Gaimard, 1832 – north, west New Guinea including Raja Ampat Islands (northwest New Guinea), Aru Islands (southwest of New Guinea), Geelvink Bay islands and islands off north coast
- H. j. albescens Schodde & Mason, IJ, 1999 – south, east New Guinea and satellites
- H. j. ambiens Mayr, 1934 – New Britain and satellites (southeast Bismarck Archipelago)
- H. j. subfusca Gould, 1856 – Admiralty Islands, New Ireland and satellites (north Bismarck Archipelago) to Solomon Islands (except Rennell Island and including Temotu), Ouvea (west Loyalty Islands, New Caledonia), and Vanuatu to Fiji and Tonga (west, central Micronesia)

Additionally, subfossil remains have been found from an undescribed extinct subspecies that was endemic to Henderson Island.

== Description ==
This species is a small swallow at 13 cm (5.1 in) in length. It has a blue-black back and crown with browner wings and tail, a red face and throat, and dusky underparts. It differs from the barn swallow and the closely related welcome swallow in its shorter and less forked tail.

== Behaviour ==
The Pacific swallow builds a neat cup-shaped nest, constructed with mud pellets collected in the beak, under a cliff ledge or on man-made structures such as a building, bridge or tunnel. The nest is lined with softer material, and the clutch is two to three eggs. It is similar in behaviour to other aerial insectivores, such as other swallows and the unrelated swifts. It is a fast flyer and feeds on insects, especially flies, while airborne.

== Gallery ==
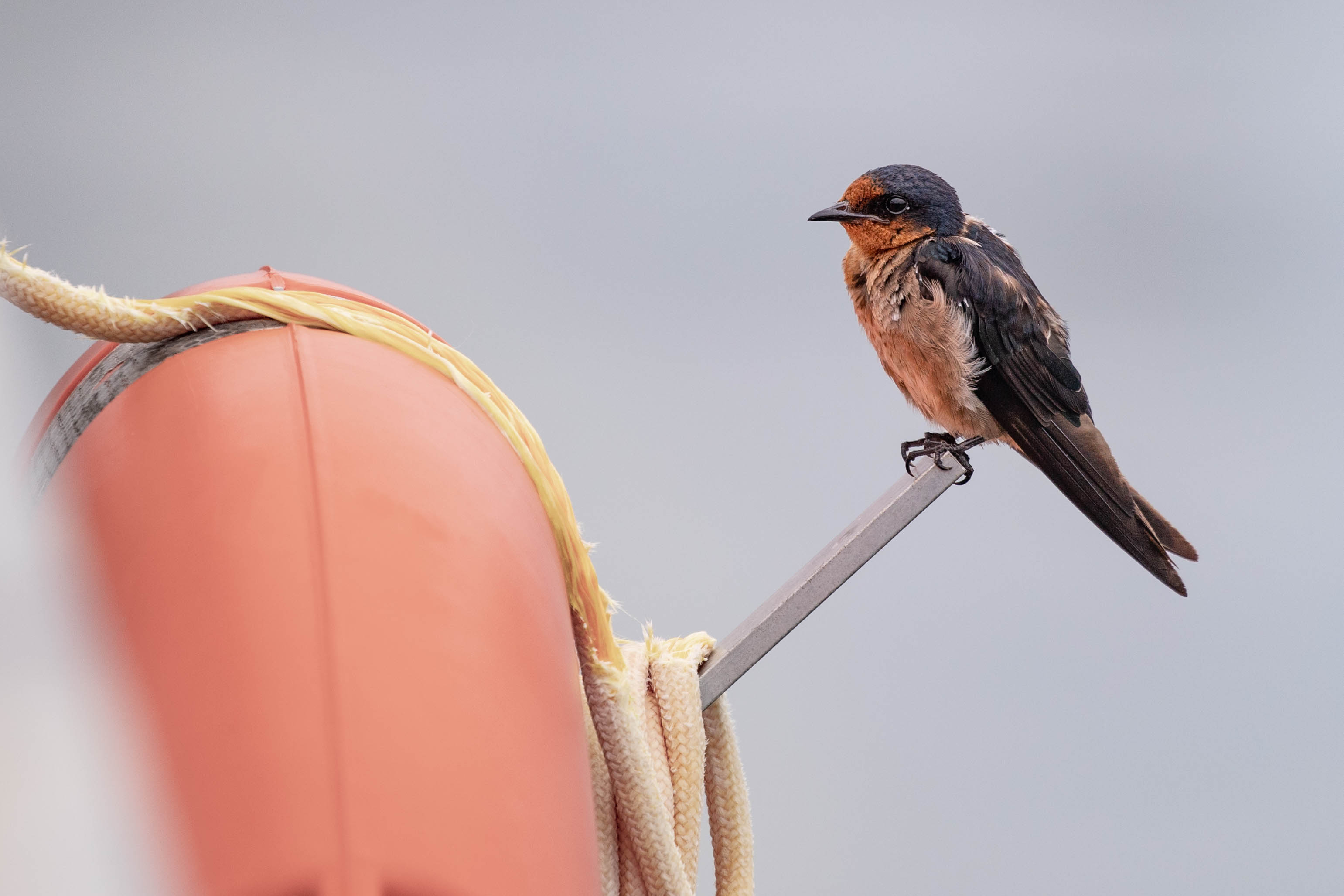
Perched

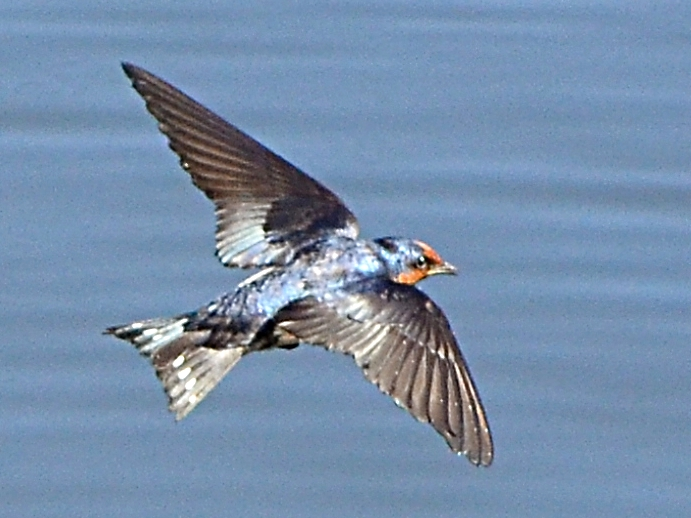
In flight

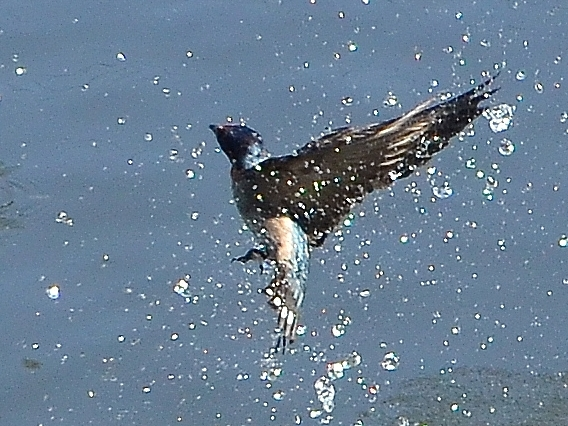
Water striking

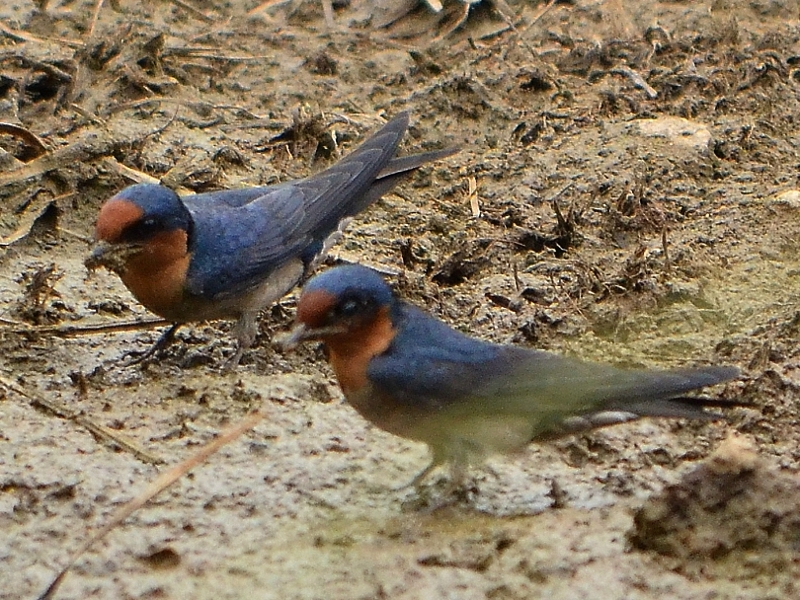
Collecting nest materials

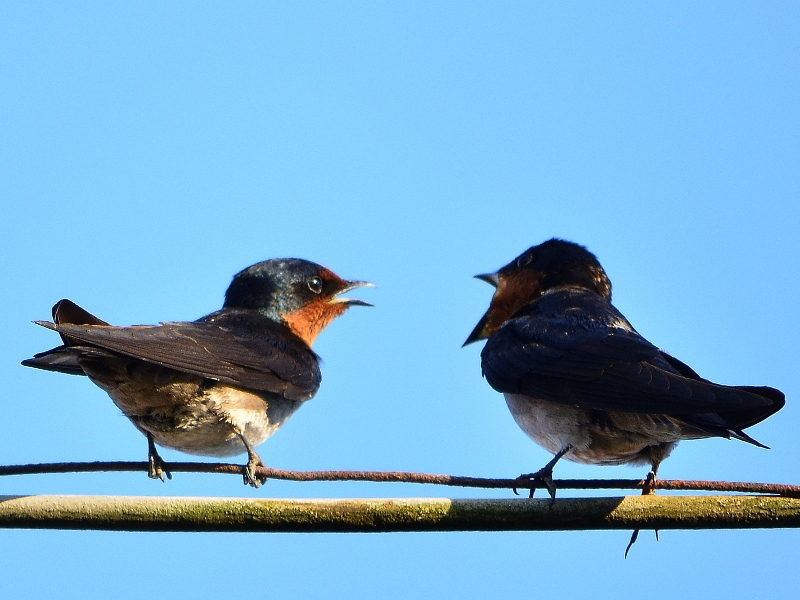
Pair
