= Historic waters =

Concept in the law of the sea

Historic waters in the law of the sea is a concept designating the waters that are treated by a coastal state as a part of its internal waters, contrary to the established international law, but with acquiescence of other states. Historic bay is a narrower term for a bay with such a "historic title". The concept of historic waters appeared at the end of the 19th century and some commentators consider it to be anachronistic in the 21st century. Ancient title is a similar judicial doctrine based on a different reasoning: during the Age of Discovery and prior to the 18th-century concept of freedom of the high seas, the open sea was considered territoria nullius (nobody's territory) and thus claims for newly discovered parts of it by colonial powers were legitimate. Some historic bay claims were subsequently converted to juridical bays (for example, Delaware Bay and Chesapeake Bay in the US). The goal of protecting "vital" waters is pursued by the states through the modern maritime zones.

== Historic rights in the case law ==
The concept of historic water goes against the established modern principles of claiming the internal waters, as originally defined by the Convention on the Territorial Sea and the Contiguous Zone in 1958: normal baselines, straight baselines, baselines of bays.

The Convention also mentioned (but did not define) the historic bays following the Second Committee of the League of Nations Codification Conference, 1930 that accepted the existence of historic waters while underscoring the lack of their definition. Since then the international bodies avoided defining the term and even used the term established rights instead. The intent of adding the term to Convention was to create an exception accommodating the bays that are already recognized as part of the internal waters of sovereign states.

In its 2016 ruling in Philippines v. China, an arbitral tribunal operating under United Nations Convention on the Law of the Sea confirmed the existence of historic rights, although stopped short of endorsing the sovereignty aspect of historic claims by stating that the "[h]istoric rights may include sovereignty, but may equally include more limited rights, such as fishing rights or rights of access". The tribunal attempted to separate historic rights in their limited sense, while applying the term historic title when discussing the sovereignty.

== Proof of title ==
The International Law Commission, in its "Juridical régime of historic waters, including historic bays", required that for the claim to be valid under the doctrine of historic title, the state needs proofs of:

- a three-pronged exercise of authority:
  - an act declaring assertion of authority by the sovereign, the bay shall be treated like the other internal waters;
  - public declaration of the assertion of authority made by the government;
  - effective exercise of the authority: if an action needs to be taken to defend the claim, it shall have been taken;
- a long and continuous usage. Both the considerable length of the period of exercise of sovereignty and of the actual usage activity during this period are important;
- acquiescence of foreign states, understood as inaction of other states with respect to the claim.

The ancient title, unlike the historic title, is not adverse, as by definition no other states were dispossessed at the time of the claim. The requirements of proof are thus lower. The sovereign needs to show that:

- it was the first sovereign to claim the particular area and
- the area was effectively occupied (to the standards of the time) prior to the acceptance of the freedom of high seas doctrine.

== Sources ==
- Symmons, C. (2019). Historic Waters and Historic Rights in the Law of the Sea: A Modern Re-Appraisal. Publications on Ocean Development (2nd ed.). Brill. ISBN 978-90-04-37701-1.
  - Symmons, Clive R. (2019a). "General Issues Relating to Definitions of Historic Rights and Historic Waters". Historic Waters and Historic Rights in the Law of the Sea. Brill. pp. 1–13. doi:10.1163/9789004377028_002. ISBN 978-90-04-37702-8. S2CID 201561141.
  - Symmons, Clive R. (2019b). "Conclusions: Does the Concept of Historic Waters or Historic Rights Have Continuing Relevance in Contemporary International Law?". Historic Waters and Historic Rights in the Law of the Sea. Brill. pp. 407–435. doi:10.1163/9789004377028_025. ISBN 978-90-04-37702-8. S2CID 201326458.
- Mirasola, Christopher (2016). "Historic Waters and Ancient Title: Outdated Doctrines for Establishing Maritime Sovereignty and Jurisdiction". Journal of Maritime Law and Commerce. 47. Cambridge University Press: 29–.
- Ruderman, Barry L. (1987). "The Doctrine of Ancient Title: Unknown Origins Uncertain Future". San Diego Law Review. 24: 769–793.
- Barrie, George N. (1973). "Historical Bays". The Comparative and International Law Journal of Southern Africa. 6 (1): 39–62.
