= Venus Bay Conservation Park =

Protected area in South Australia

- IUCN category VI (protected area with sustainable use of natural resources)
- Location within South Australia
- Location: South Australia
- Nearest city: Venus Bay
- Coordinates: 33°9′5″S 134°34′9″E
- Area: 63.76 km^{2} (24.62 sq mi)
- Established: 12 February 1976; 50 years ago
- Governing body: Department for Environment and Water
- Website: Official website

Venus Bay Conservation Park is a protected area located on the west coast of Eyre Peninsula in South Australia immediately west of the town of Venus Bay. It consists of land on the Weyland Peninsula on the south side of Venus Bay, land on the north west side of the bay to the west of the town of Port Kenny and the seven islands located within the bay. The conservation park was originally proclaimed to protect "important feeding and breeding grounds for many native birds". The conservation park is classified as an IUCN Category VI protected area.
