= Baird Bay Islands Conservation Park =

Protected area in South Australia

- IUCN category IV (habitat/species management area)
- Location within South Australia
- Location: South Australia
- Nearest city: Streaky Bay
- Coordinates: 33°4′52″S 134°17′4″E
- Area: 11 ha (27 acres)
- Established: 16 March 1967
- Visitors: "numbers unknown" (in 2006)
- Governing body: Department for Environment and Water

Baird Bay Islands Conservation Park is a protected area in the Australian state of South Australia associated with two islands located in Baird Bay on the west coast of Eyre Peninsula respectively about 32 kilometres (20 miles) and 45 kilometres (28 miles) west south-west of Streaky Bay.

The islands are respectively an unnamed island within Baird Bay and Jones Island, and each first obtained protected area status as a fauna conservation reserve declared under the Crown Lands Act 1929-1966 on 16 March 1967. On 27 April 1972, the land under protection was reconstituted as the Baird Bay Islands Conservation Park upon the proclamation of the National Parks and Wildlife Act 1972.

In 1980, the conservation park was described as follows:

Two low flat limestone islands. The unnamed island in Baird Bay (section 181) is connected to the mainland at low tide and features a largely introduced flora. Jones Island off the mouth of Baird Bay retains its natural vegetation. Islands dedicated as a park primarily to preserve the breeding habitat of sea-birds including the uncommon osprey, pelicans, sooty oyster catchers and crested terns. A colony of Australian sea-lions also utilises Jones Island. Jones Island is in good condition in the absence of introduced species and retains considerable conservation importance. The unnamed island in Baird Bay is degraded.

The conservation park is classified as an IUCN Category IV protected area. In 1980, the conservation park was listed on the former Register of the National Estate.
