= Baird Bay =

Baird Bay South Australia
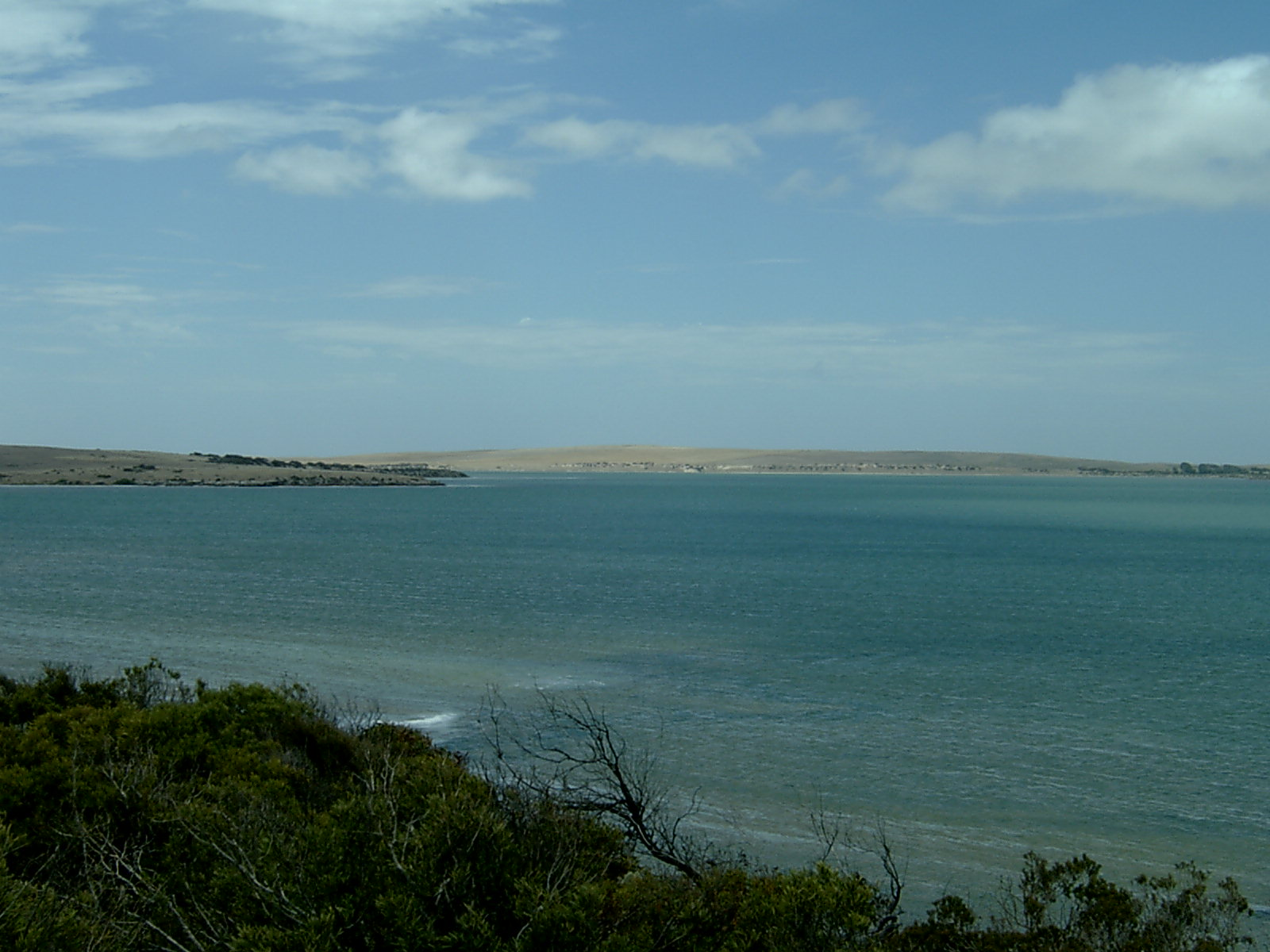
- The isolated waters of Baird Bay

- Coordinates: 33°08′51″S 134°21′47″E
- Population: 5 (SAL 2021)
- Established: 12 April 2001
- Postcode(s): 5671
- Elevation: 1 m (3 ft)
- Time zone: ACST (UTC+9:30)
  - Summer (DST): ACST (UTC+10:30)
- LGA(s): District Council of Streaky Bay
- Region: Eyre Western
- County: Robinson
- State electorate(s): Flinders
- Federal division(s): Grey
Mean max temp	Mean min temp	Annual rainfall
23.1 °C; 74 °F	12.2 °C; 54 °F	378.0 mm 14.9 in
Localities around Baird Bay:
Baird Bay (body of water)	Calca	Tyringa
Baird Bay (body of water)	Baird Bay	Tyringa; Anxious Bay
Baird Bay (body of water)	Anxious Bay	Anxious Bay
- Footnotes: Adjoining localities

Baird Bay is a small fishing village located 50 kilometres (31 miles) south of Streaky Bay on the west coast of Eyre Peninsula in South Australia. It is situated on the east coast of a bay named Baird Bay which opens into the north end of Anxious Bay.

== Nomenclature ==
The locality is named after the nearby bay which was named after James Baird, who settled on the shores of Anxious Bay in 1850 before being speared by local Aboriginals on 2 November 1850. The bay was known as Beard's Bay until 5 December 1940 when it was renamed to Baird Bay by proclamation.

== Ecotourism ==
Although the township is small, Baird Bay has become a tourist attraction due to its Australian sea lion colony. Local tour guides take small groups of tourists for interactive swimming sessions with the sea lions and Bottlenose dolphins. It is regarded as one of the best dive or snorkeling destinations in South Australia. The remote waters of Baird Bay are also popular for recreational fishing.

The isolated town has very limited facilities, with only a few houses, a camping ground and boat ramp. The nearest town for supplies is Streaky Bay, 51 kilometres (32 miles) north.

The 2021 Australian census which was conducted in August 2021 reported that Baird Bay had a population of 5 people.

Baird Bay is located within the federal division of Grey, the state electoral district of Flinders and the local government area of the District Council of Streaky Bay.
