= Port Kenny, South Australia =

Port Kenny
- Town
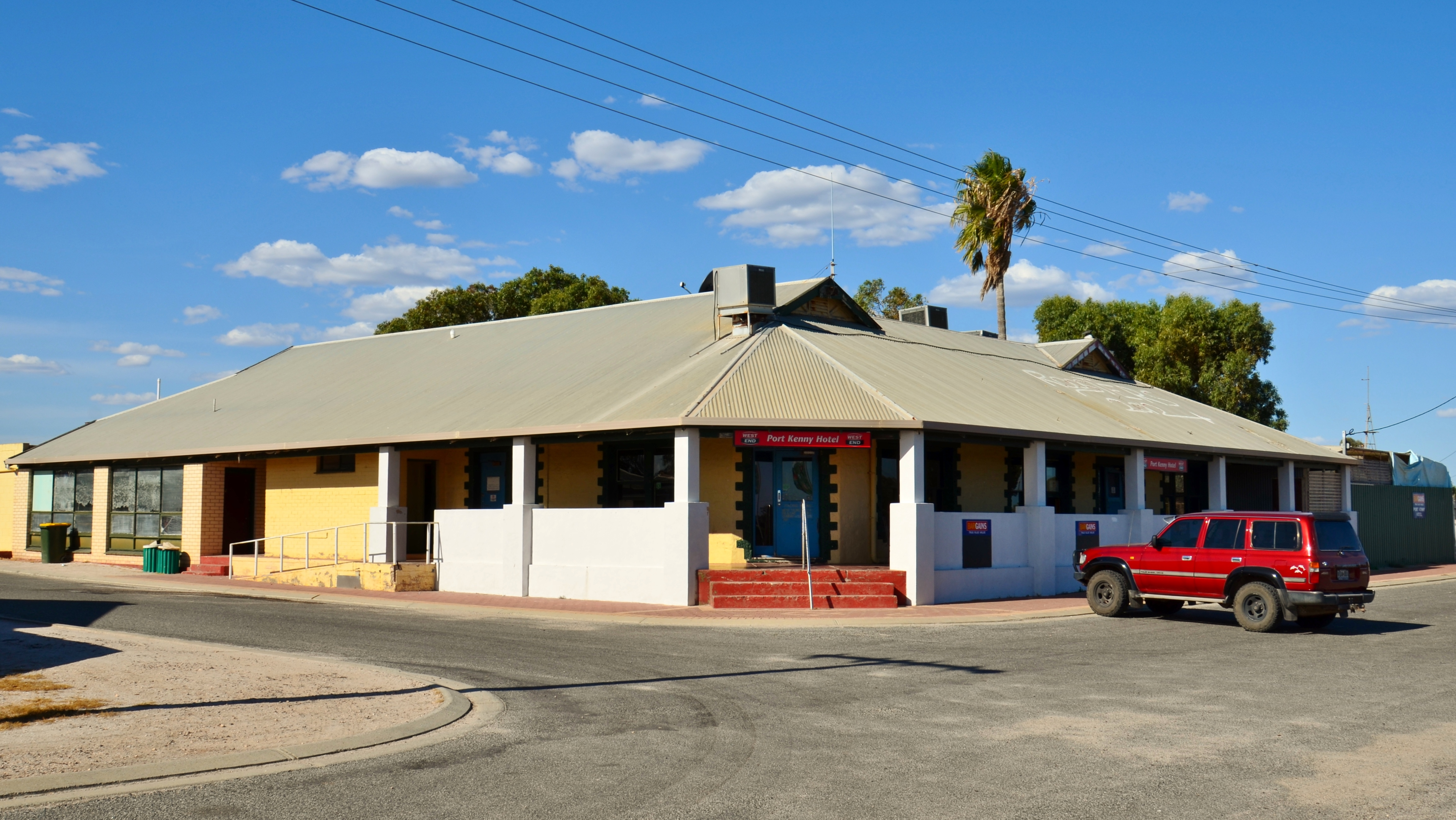
- Port Kenny Hotel

- Coordinates: 33°10′S 134°41′E
- Country: Australia
- State: South Australia
- LGA: District Council of Elliston
- Location: 655 km (407 mi) West of Adelaide
- Established: 1912

Government
  - State electorate: Flinders
  - Federal division: Grey
- Elevation: 17 m (56 ft)

Population
  - Total: 59 (SAL 2021)
- Postcode: 5671

Port Kenny is a small town located on the Eyre Peninsula in South Australia. It serves as a central point for the surrounding agricultural district, as well as professional fishermen and tourists. It currently has a very small population.

== History ==
The township of Port Kenny was surveyed in 1912, with Governor Bosanquet naming the town after a local landholder, Michael Kenny. The town grew slightly with the help of the pub, before the hotel began operation in 1939. But the town was pivotal in handling the grain and wool which was produced in the hinterland, with grain still being shipped from Port Kenny until the 2000s.

As early as the late 1920s, the area was recognised as a recreational fishing destination, with anglers travelling to the tiny outposts to catch trevally and salmon.

== Geography ==
Port Kenny lies on Venus Bay, a highly protected body of water characterised by tidal flats, mangrove swamps, small islands and shallow beaches. Nearby town Venus Bay lies close to the entrance of the bay, while Port Kenny lies on the northernmost side of the bay. The land around the town is relatively flat, and used primarily for agriculture.

== Economy ==
Agriculture is the towns main economic input, with cereal crops and livestock commonly farmed. Tourism supplements this, with the aid of the town hotel and caravan park.

The town features a base to which other destinations can be visited. The town jetty and surrounding waters are also known for their fishing potential, with whiting, flathead, trevally and garfish commonly caught.
