= Venus Bay, South Australia =

Venus Bay
- Town
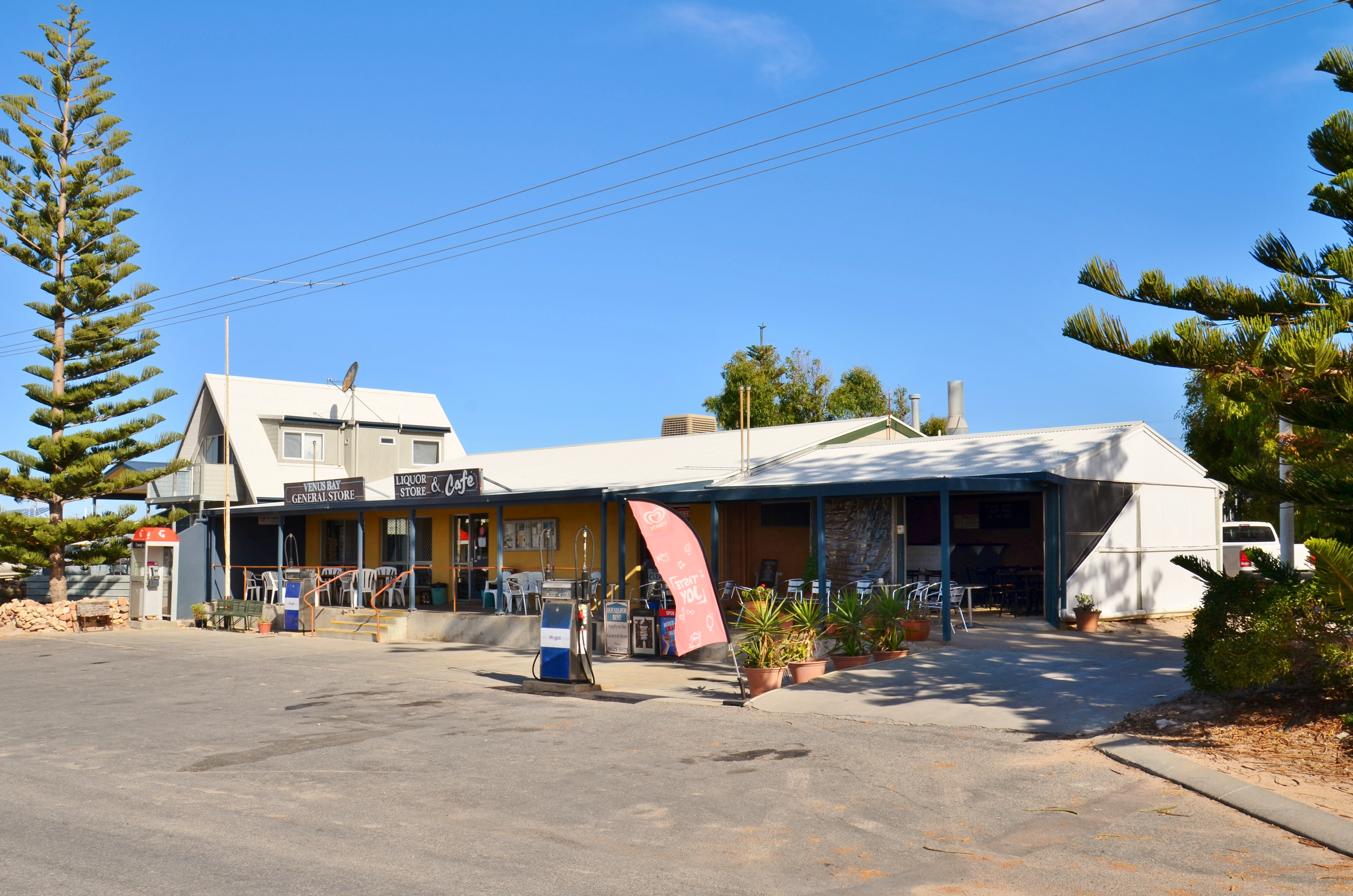
- Venus Bay General Store

- Coordinates: 33°13′0″S 134°40′0″E
- Country: Australia
- State: South Australia
- LGA: District Council of Elliston
- Location: 665 km (413 mi) North West of Adelaide
- Established: 1864

Government
  - State electorate: Flinders
  - Federal division: Grey
- Elevation: 1 m (3.3 ft)

Population
  - Total: 59 (SAL 2021)
- Postcode: 5607

Venus Bay (formerly Parkin) is a small tourist and fishing town sited on the bay of the same name, on the Eyre Peninsula in South Australia. The town population numbers in the twenties for most of the year, but its numbers greatly increase during the summer holidays. At the 2006 census, Venus Bay had a population of 139. The town also serves professional fishermen who fish the Southern Ocean.

== History ==
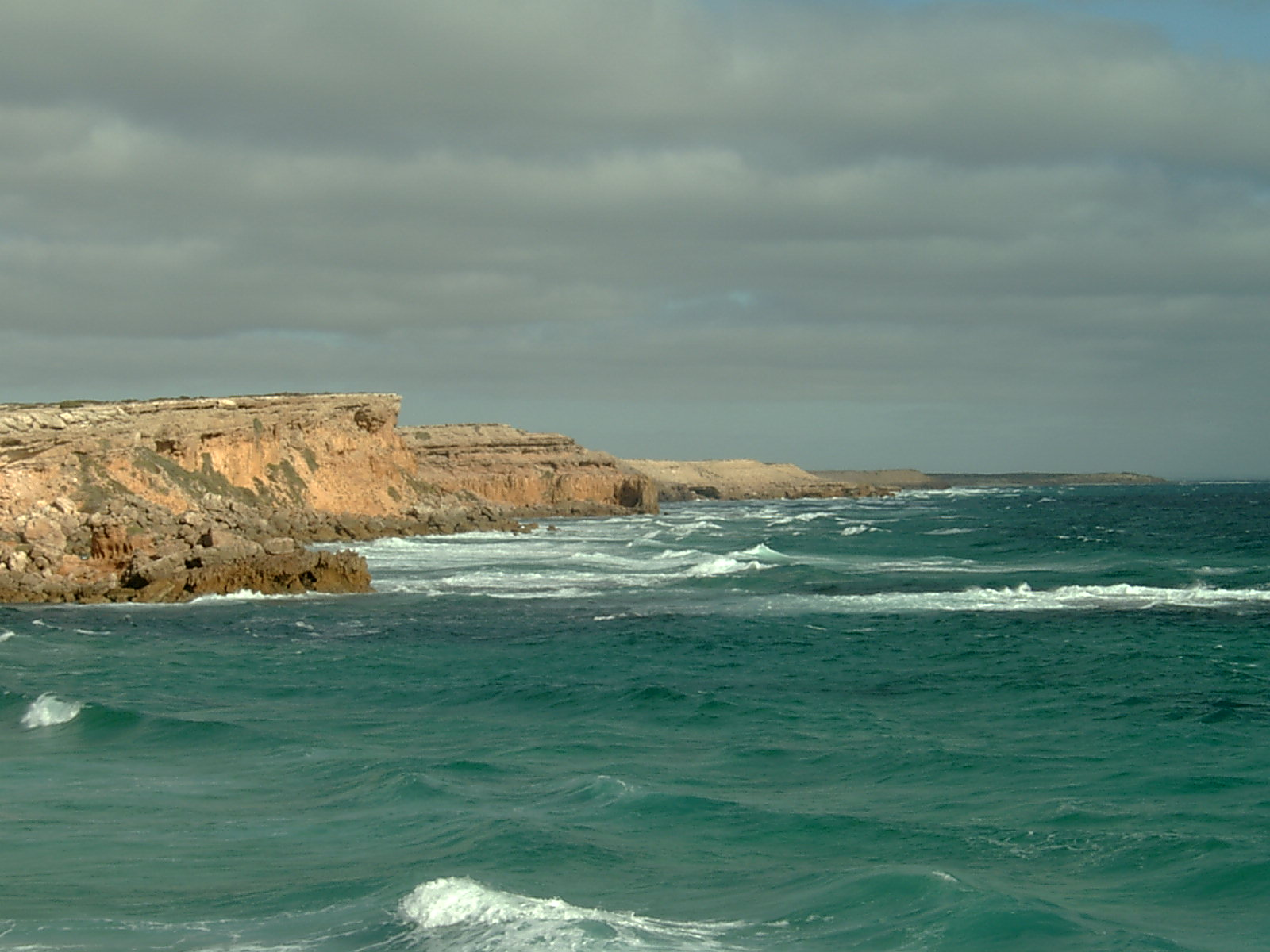
The entrance to Venus Bay

Venus Bay, as with most of the coast of the Eyre Peninsula, was first recorded by Captain Matthew Flinders in 1802, during his attempt to map the coast of southern Australia, although he did not land, did not name it, and had no idea of its extent. The first Europeans to explore the bay were the party which landed from the brig Nerus in March 1839, comprising Captain F.R. Lees, David McLaren, and Samuel Stephens, the latter two being the current and former Colonial Managers of the South Australian Company, who were examining the West Coast for potential special surveys, but they also did not name it.

Sheep pastoralists soon followed, and in 1850, in order to load wool, the bay was first entered by a vessel, Robert Venn's schooner Venus, 60 tons, from which the bay took its name. The Venus continued to trade along the coast, carrying wool, wheat, and passengers, until she was sold in 1852 to NSW, where she was wrecked at Cronulla on 22 July.

The town was established after a whaling station was built in the 1850s, and for twenty years it existed as no more than a shop, hotel and police station. In 1855 there were eleven Aboriginal mounted constables of the Native Police Force stationed at Venus Bay under Sergeant Eyre. The focus of the town soon turned from wool and pastoralism to agriculture as the area was opened for cereal cropping in the 1870s. The town was surveyed in August 1864 and was subsequently given the name "Parkin" (also spelt as Parkyn in one source) in honour of William Parkin, who was notable as a businessman, politician and philanthropist. The name of the town was officially changed to "Venus Bay" in July 1940.

The township was abandoned by 1900, but was revitalised in the 1920s when it became the base for a commercial fishing operation. This led to a school being established in 1939 which, however, closed in 1955.

== Environment ==
The town of Venus Bay lies on the bay of the same name, with numerous tidal flats, shallow lagoons, mangroves, islands, and a number of deep channels that carry water in and out of the bay. The entrance is lined by towering cliffs, as is much of the coast, but in the bay, the landscape is flat lying, with much of this land used for agricultural purposes. The bay is highly sheltered, contrasting to the entrance where large swells constantly batter the coast.

=== Important Bird Area ===
The bay, with its wetlands and beaches, has been identified as an 83 km^{2} Important Bird Area (IBA) by BirdLife International because it regularly supports over 1% of the world populations of pied and sooty oystercatchers as well as small numbers of fairy terns.

== Economy ==
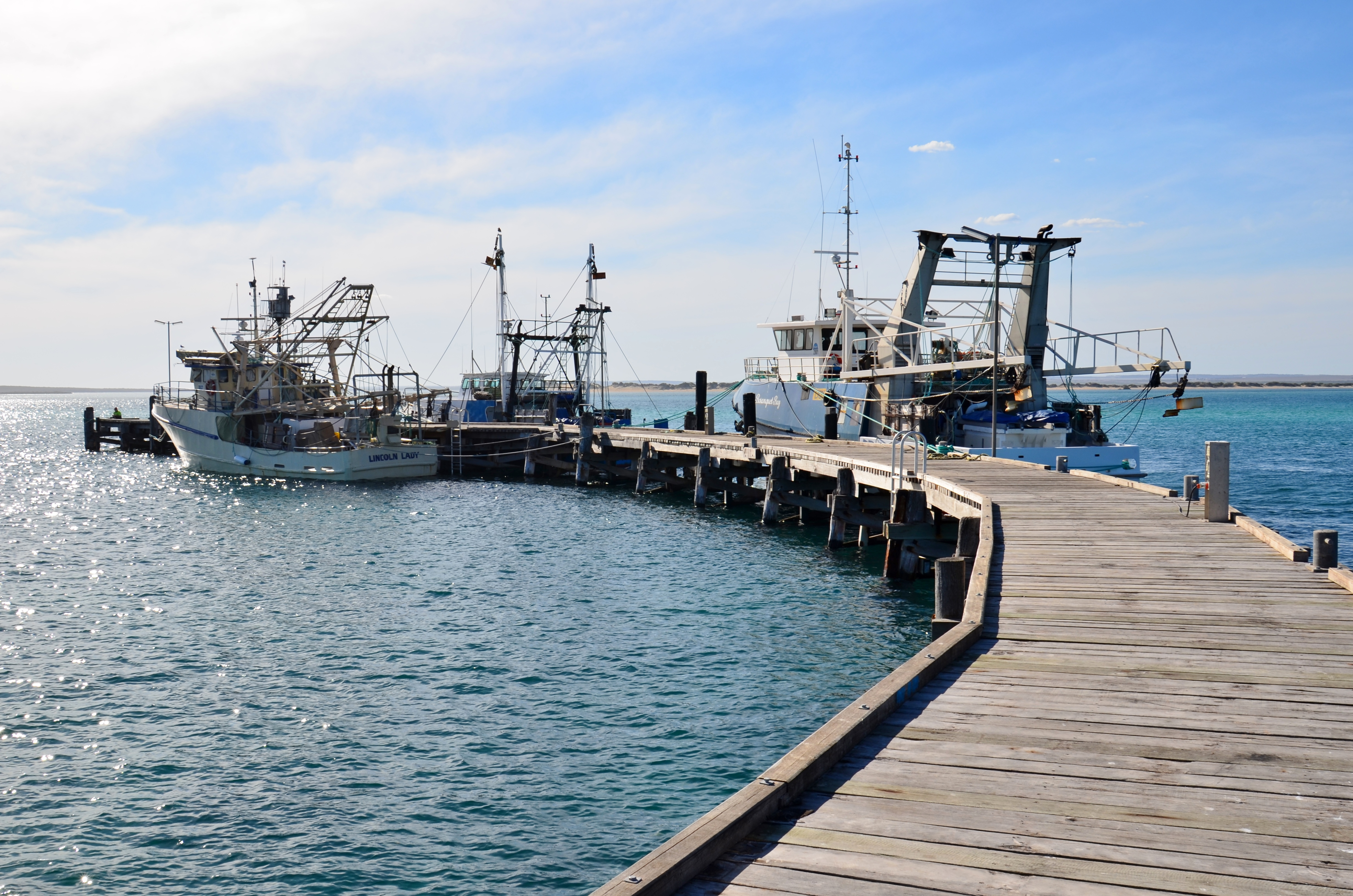
Venus Bay Jetty

The economy of the town is heavily dependent on commercial fishing, with a number of boats using Venus Bay as an offloading base, where fish, lobster and abalone are transported for sale. Agriculture does impact the town's economy, but the agricultural areas are more centralised toward Port Kenny.

=== Tourism ===
Venus Bay also relies heavily on tourism, particularly during the summer, when its small caravan park regularly fills up. Venus Bay is primarily a fishing and water sport based destination, with the sheltered waters providing small boat users with a safe fishing environment. The bay is known to hold whiting, salmon, garfish, snook, tommy ruff, flathead and gummy shark, with most of these caught off the town's jetty also.

There are several tourist walks near the town, as well as drives to surrounding areas such as Talia Caves and Mount Camel Beach. Daily supplies and accommodation are available from the licensed general store and cafe, as well as other accommodation in the caravan park and private beach houses. The northern end of the Lake Newland Conservation Park lies about 20 km to the south of the town.

== See also ==
- Venus Bay Conservation Park
