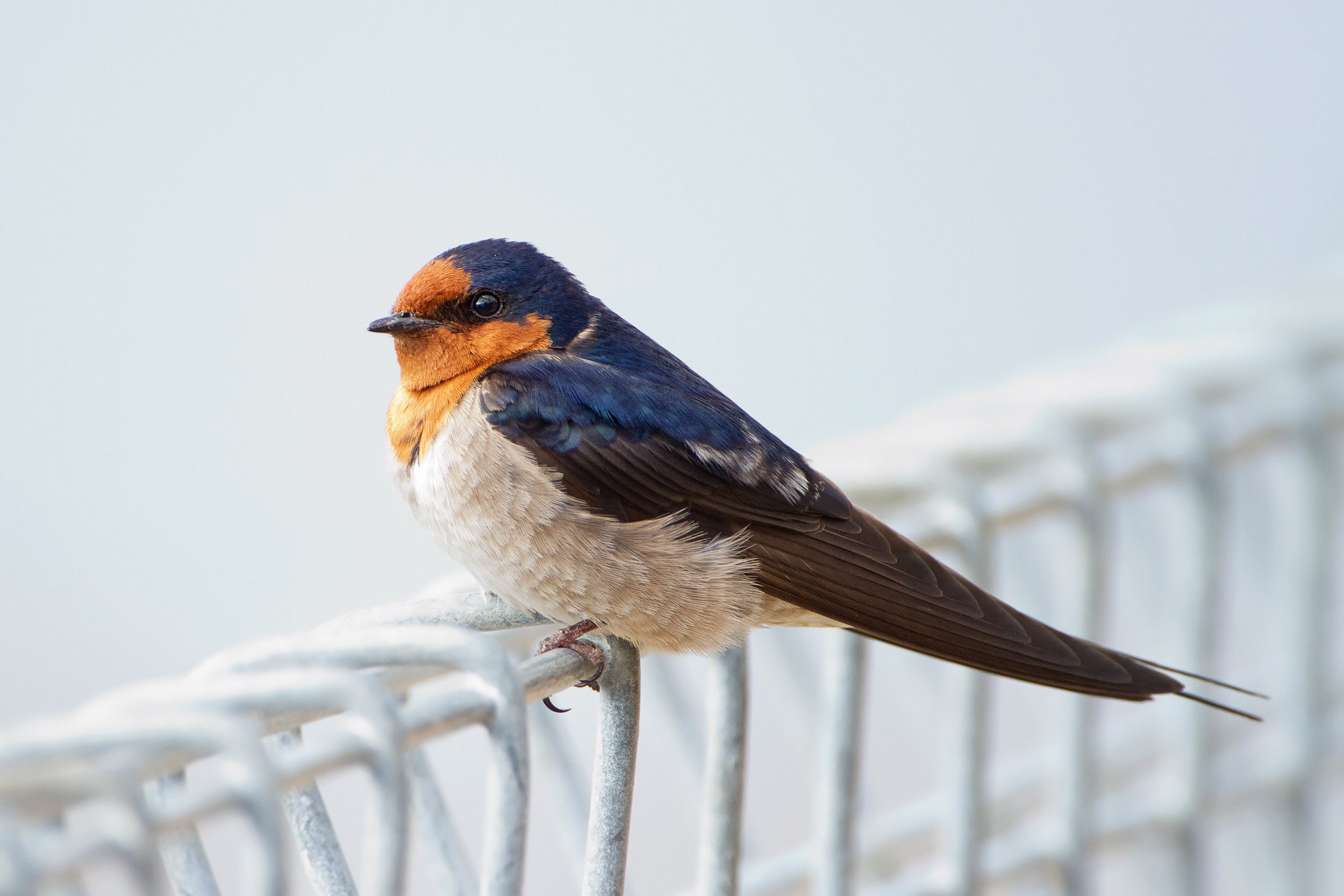
- At Risdon Brook Park in Tasmania

Conservation status
- Least Concern (IUCN 3.1)

Scientific classification
- Kingdom: Animalia
- Phylum: Chordata
- Class: Aves
- Order: Passeriformes
- Family: Hirundinidae
- Genus: Hirundo
- Species: H. neoxena

Binomial name
- Hirundo neoxena Gould, 1842

= Welcome swallow =

Species of bird

The welcome swallow (Hirundo neoxena) is a small passerine bird in the swallow family Hirundinidae that is native to Australia and nearby islands. It has self-introduced into New Zealand in the middle of the twentieth century. It is very similar to the Pacific swallow with which it is often considered conspecific.

This species breeds in southern and eastern Australia in a variety of habitats, mostly in open areas, man-made clearings or urban environments, but not desert or dense forest. Eastern populations are largely migratory, wintering in northern Australia. Western birds and those in New Zealand are mainly sedentary.

== Taxonomy ==
The welcome swallow was first described in 1842 by John Gould in his The Birds of Australia as a member of the genus Hirundo, but the first publication is often incorrectly given as in the Proceedings of the Zoological Society of London. Both its species name and common name refer to people welcoming its return as a herald of spring in southern parts of Australia.

== Description ==
The welcome swallow is a small fast-flying bird. Its flying style is circular in pattern with swift darting motions. It has graceful shape and flight, moreover it often flies singly, in couples or in clusters. The welcome swallow is metallic blue-black above, light grey below on the breast and belly, and rusty on the forehead, throat and upper breast. It has a long forked tail, with a row of white spots on the individual feathers. These birds are about 15 cm (5.9 in) long, including the outer tail feathers which are slightly shorter in the female. The welcome swallow's weight is about 9-20g. From the Gould collection in Tasmania a "natural size" male had a wing size of 11.1 cm (4.4 in), tail size of 7.4 cm (2.9 in), and a culmen of 0.7 cm (0.28 in). While the female has 10.9 cm (4.3 in) wings, a 6.25 cm (2.46 in) tail, and a culmen of 0.7 cm (0.28 in). The call is a mixture of twittering and soft warbling notes, and a sharp whistle in alarm. However, their call is normally quiet and does not travel very far.

Young welcome swallows are buffy white, instead of rufous, on the forehead and throat, and have shorter tail streamers.

== Distribution and habitat ==
The winter range in northern Australia overlaps with that of wintering barn swallow (Hirundo rustica), but the latter is readily separable by its blue breast band. Welcome swallows readily breed close to human habitation. Welcome swallows are commonly found on wires, posts and other perches.

=== Natural global range ===
Welcome swallows have a very large distributional range because they are a cross-regional species. Welcome swallows live mostly in eastern, western, southern and central Australia. The welcome swallows that live in eastern Australia move to northern Australia in winter. The welcome swallows that live in Western Australia and others that live in New Zealand are mostly not migratory. This swallow species has been observed nesting in the majority of New Zealand and its surrounding islands, Australia and some parts of Tasmania. Currently, this species has been recorded in New Guinea, New Caledonia and other surrounding islands. The distribution of the welcome swallow also depends on seasonal change. During the winter, the welcome swallow in Australia will move towards the north which places it closer to the equator and warm weather. For the following spring, they will return to southern Australia to breed.

=== New Zealand range ===
The welcome swallow is a self-introduced species from Australia that is believed to have flown over to New Zealand in the early 1900s. The welcome swallow is found throughout most parts of New Zealand, but it is very rare in Fiordland. The shape of New Zealand is narrow and long, which helped the birds to easily get to areas near water. They are also on Chatham and Kermadec Islands and in some instances have been seen on Campbell Island, Auckland Island and the Snares.

=== Habitat preferences ===
Although welcome swallows are more often near coastal and wetland areas, they can live in almost all types of habitat, except alpine areas and very dense forest. They have been documented in open areas such as farmlands, grasslands, partly cleared areas that are wooded, lands associated with bodies of water such as lakes or reservoirs, and along coastlines. This species is well-adapted for urban and suburban life as well; it is even able to live in high altitude areas due to the provision of nesting materials provided by humans. During winter, welcome swallows move to a warmer habitat which can provide them enough food and safe shelter.

== Behaviour ==
=== Breeding ===
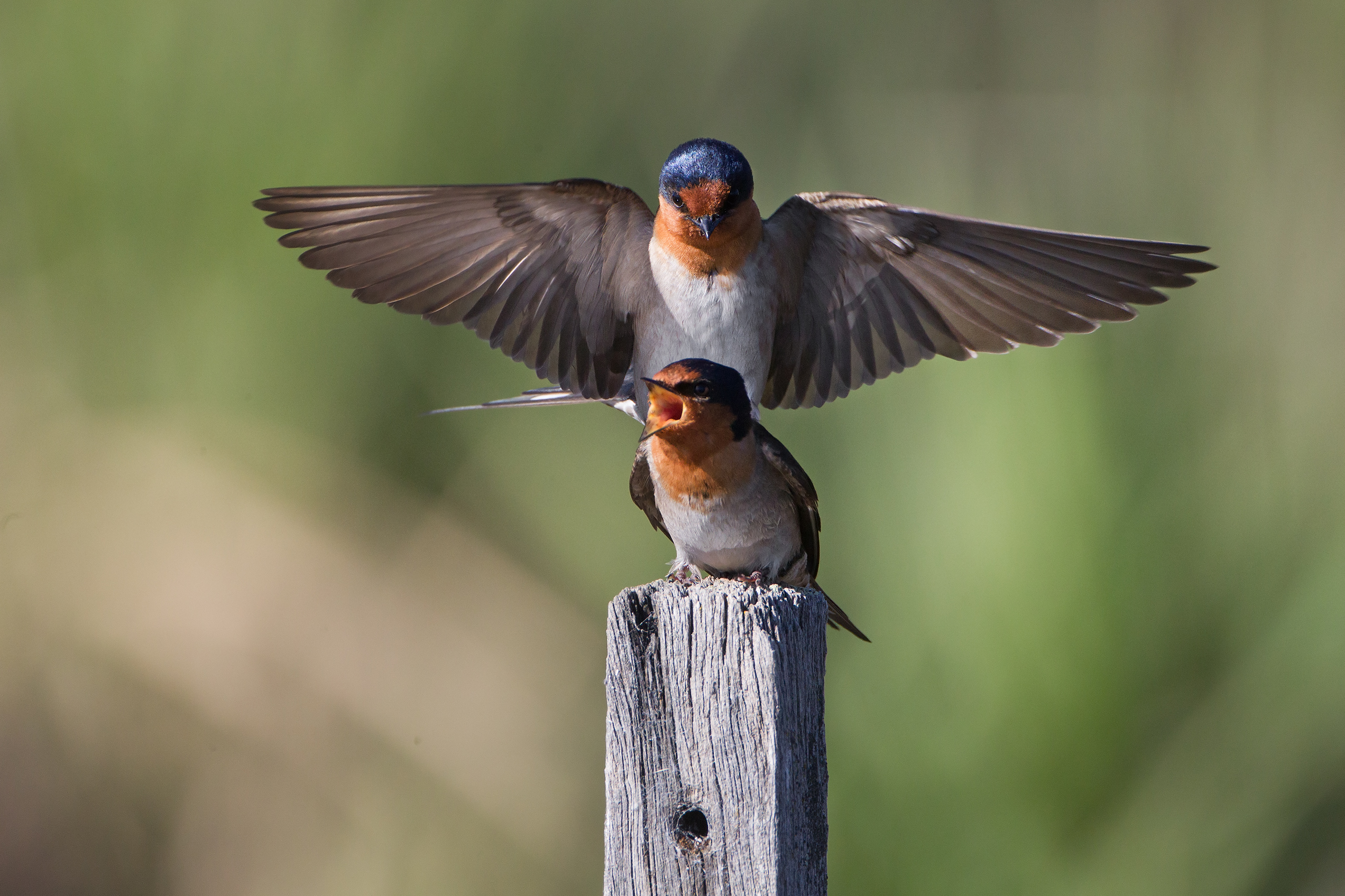
Copulating welcome swallows

Once the welcome swallow reaches maturity it has a long breeding period. They have a monogamous social structure and a breeding period that lasts from August until March. The nest is an open cup of mud and grass, made by both sexes, and is attached to a structure, such as a vertical rock wall or building. It is lined with feathers and fur, and three to five eggs are laid. Two broods are often raised in a season. The nest size ranges from 5 centimetres to 13.5 centimetres. One particular study showed that the nests that were the highest tended to have a higher fledgling success rate possibly due to the inability of mammals to access the nests. Nesting sites can be a variety of areas and have been documented to be from urban and suburban areas to rural areas. Buildings, moveable boats and ferries, hollowed-out trees, caves and cliffs, mine tunnels and shafts, as well as underground water tanks have all been observed areas of nesting swallows. They build the cup-shape nests connecting to vertical rock walls or buildings to avoid sunlight. Nests on average take 8–23 days to build, and are often re-used for consecutive years of breeding. Welcome swallows often go back to their old nests for the next year to breed. They always work as a flock. When breeding, they usually work in pairs but often small loose groups to protect their nest and territory, especially against predatory birds. The number of successful broods can vary year to year; however, the maximum number of broods recorded is three. Each brood or clutch can range from two to seven eggs with an average of four. However, during the beginning of a breeding season, clutch sizes have been known to be bigger, whereas towards the end of the breeding season clutch sizes may be smaller. Eggs are generally laid in twenty-four- to forty-eight-hour intervals; however, one nest can have multiple clutches because the parent pair may abandon a nest if the clutch size is too small and then another pair will lay their eggs within that same nest. Eggs are generally 18 mm in length and 13mm in width with a pink colour and brown speckles. Male welcome swallows do not participate in the incubation of the eggs. Rather they forage while the female incubates, and when the female forages they either watch the nest for a short period or accompany the female in foraging.

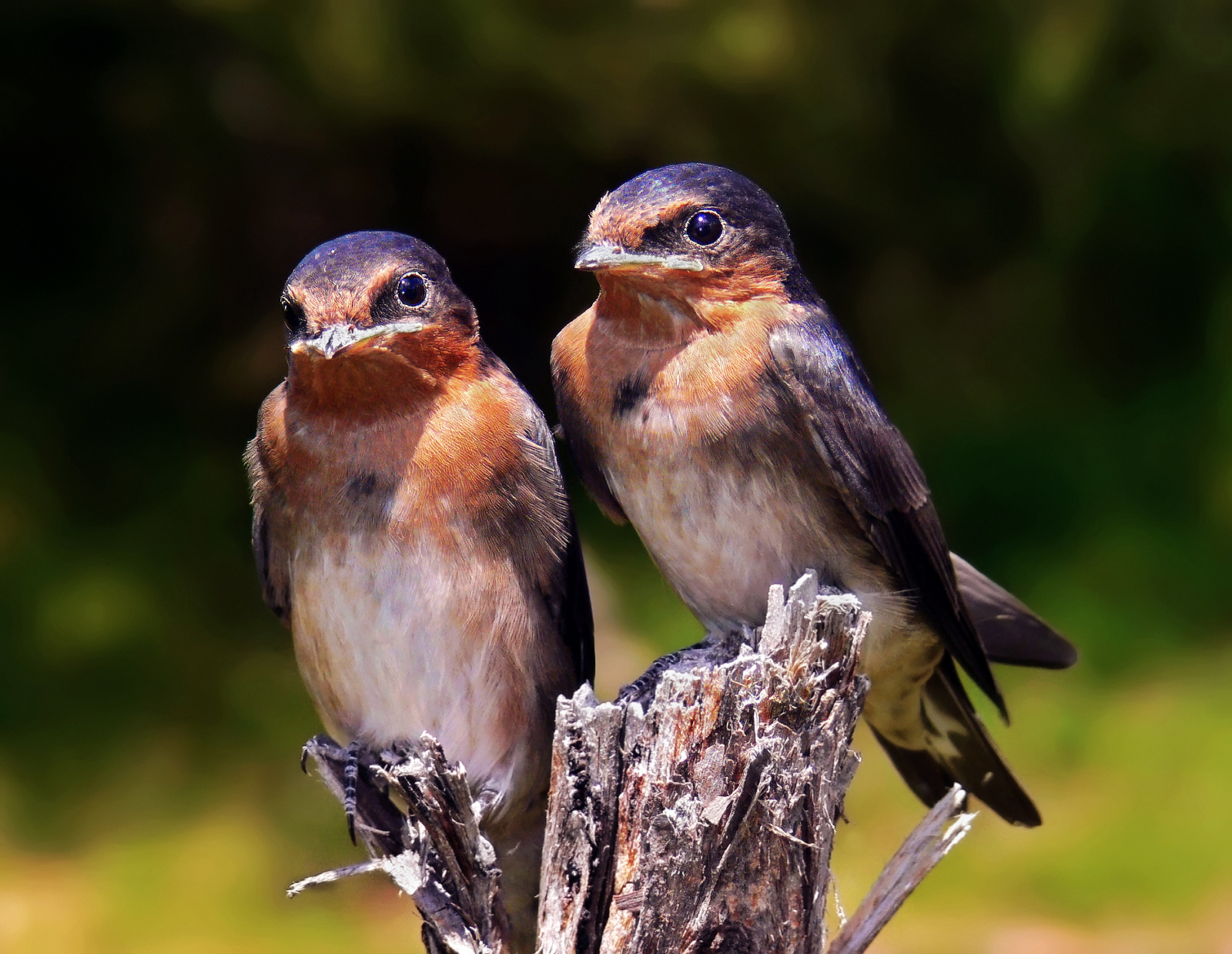
Chicks the day after fledging

The female alone incubates the eggs, which hatch after two to three weeks. The young are fed by both parents, and leave the nest after a further two to three weeks. Males have been known to remove fecal sacs after coaxing the cloaca of the young to dispose of them as well. The fledglings stay in the nest from 18 to 23 days and become completely independent around 35 days. However, they don't start breeding until 8 months to 14 months of age. Although welcome swallows are monogamous, more than just the breeding pair may take care of the young. Also, many swallows may live within the nest like during non-breeding periods where colonies will roost together in large numbers. Welcome swallows are good indicators of temperature, as the temperature drops lower, the less likely a swallow will be observed in the South. When swallows are around, the temperature usually does not drop below -2/-3 degree Celsius. Migration may occur during non-breeding seasons for larger more reliable food sources. These distances may be quite large as well during winter when food is not readily available. Individuals in this species have been known to live up to 6 years creating up to three broods a year during the breeding season.

=== Food and feeding ===
These birds are extremely agile fliers, which feed on insects while in flight. They often fly fast and low to the ground on open fields in large circles or figure eight patterns. They will often swoop around animals or people in the open. Males and females tend to forage together during breeding season even with fledglings within the nest. Welcome swallows do show a habit of drinking water while flying, they do this by scooping water within their bills from lake and pond surfaces. This is because welcome swallows need to drink water frequently, which allows them to catch insects in the water as well. Welcome swallows can also cooperate with other birds or companions to drive the insects together. They can remember the insects' activity routines to make foraging more efficient.

It has been found welcome swallows have slow growing wings that are not affected by food intake unless they are starving. This suggests that the welcome swallow prioritizes wing growth even when fasting for up to six hours at a time. It is also believed that the swallow accumulates fat in order to survive time periods when food is scarce or conditions are bad. This method allows rapid growth when conditions are good and stable growth when conditions are bad.

== Predators, parasites and diseases ==
The hawk, snake and feral cat are the main predators that hunt welcome swallows. Especially in Australia, snakes are the most dangerous predator for the birds. Snakes can climb trees to reach the nests and eat the eggs or young birds. According to one New Zealand study, the only time a nest failed was from disturbing the nest during the incubation period; these instances were from humans, mammals such as mustelids, and blackbirds preying upon the eggs. In swallows' excreta, there are various kinds of bacteria and parasites, which breed in the nest and cause very severe diseases; for example, histoplasmosis, encephalitis, salmonella, meningitis and toxoplasmosis. Hatchlings depend on maternal antibodies and immunity provided by the yolk sac within the egg. Although no specific parasites were found, welcome swallows are known as colonial breeders and are at a high risk for parasites, which may be a cause of lower breeding success but an increase in immune responsiveness. Another disease that not only affects the poultry business, but also the welcome swallow is fowlpox. This virus has two forms, cutaneous (mild harm) and diphtheritic (deadly); poultry is usually vaccinated for the virus, but wildlife is not.

== Gallery ==
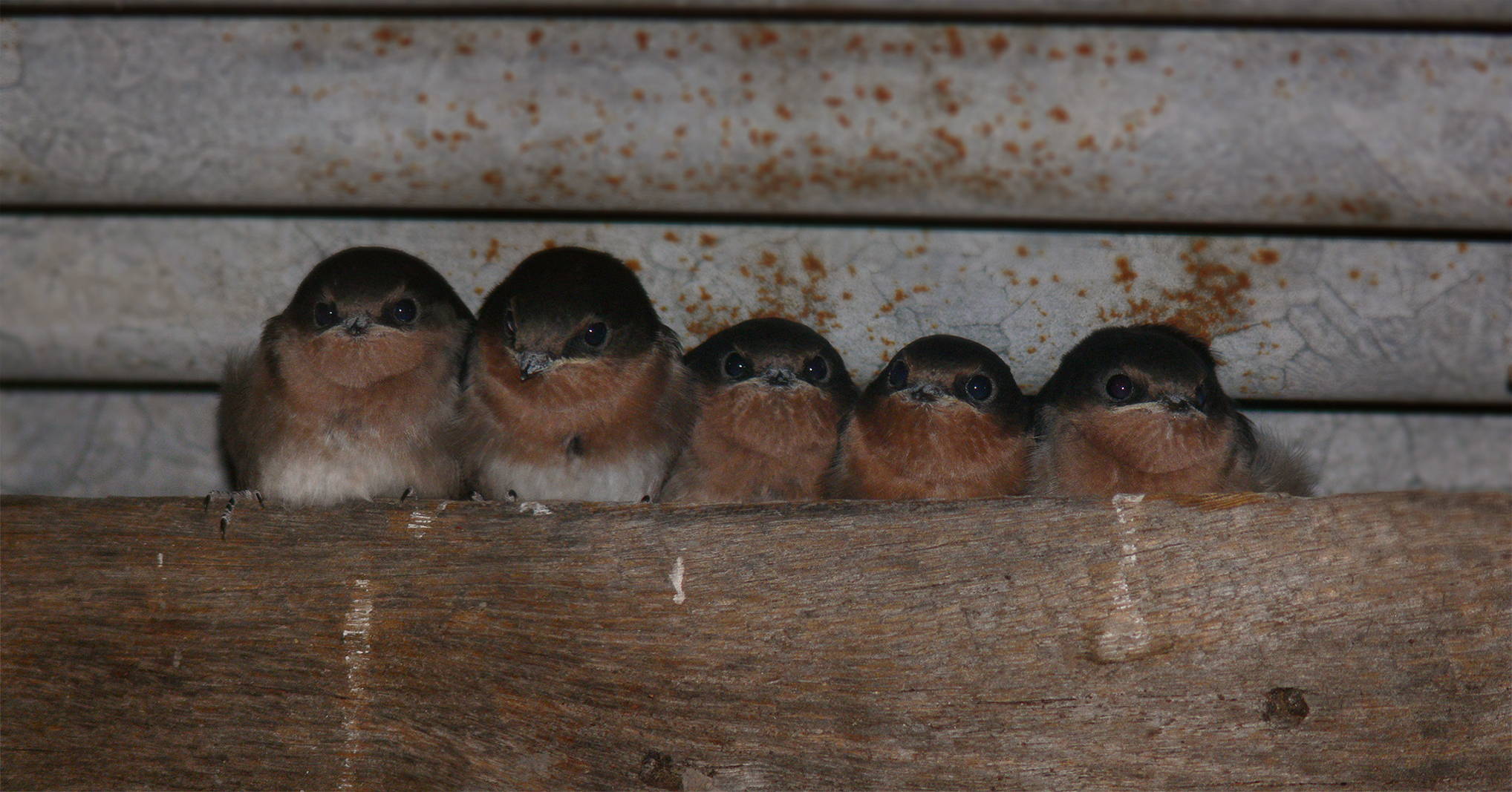
Parents (left) and three chicks

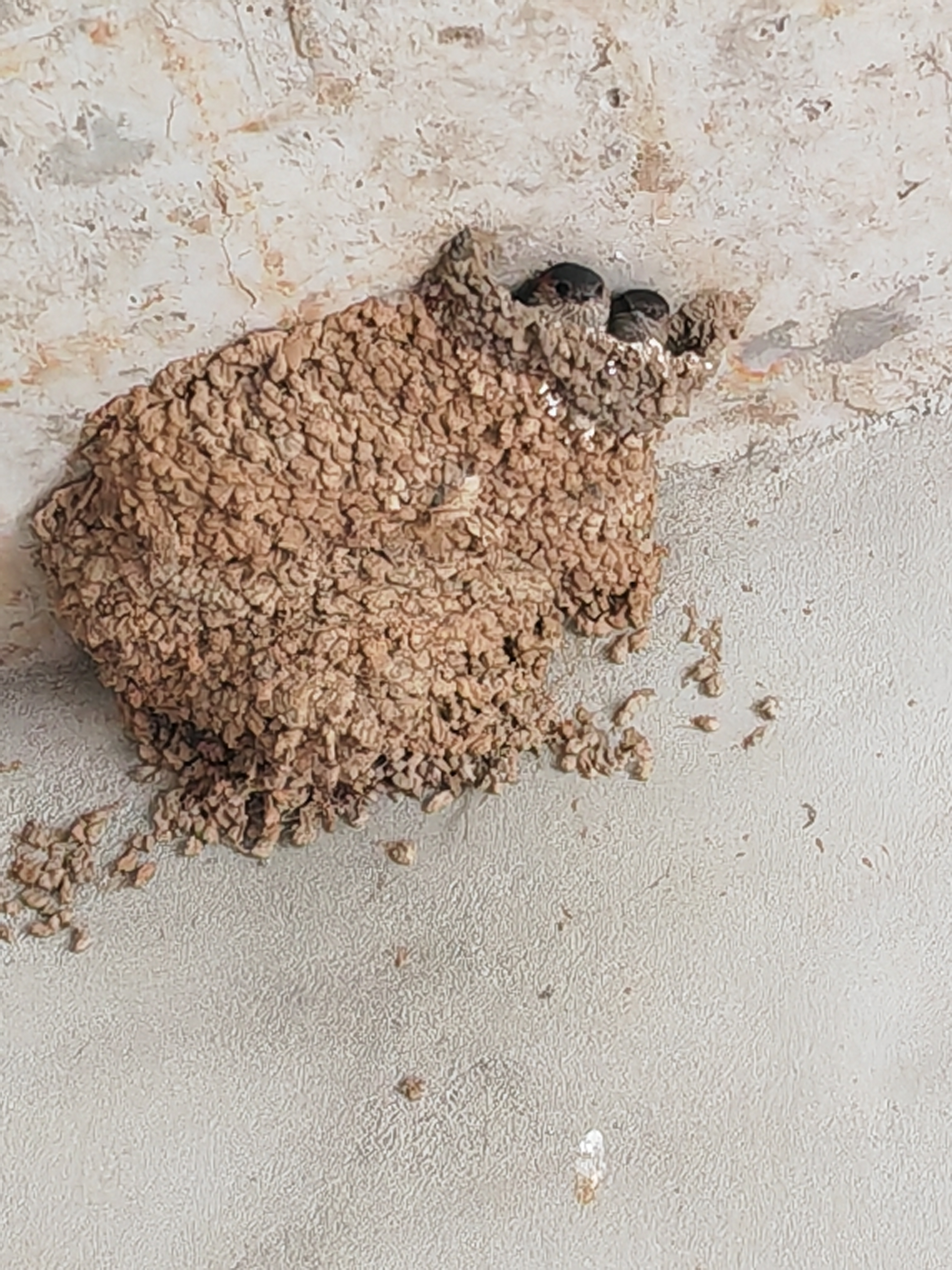
Two chicks still in the nest

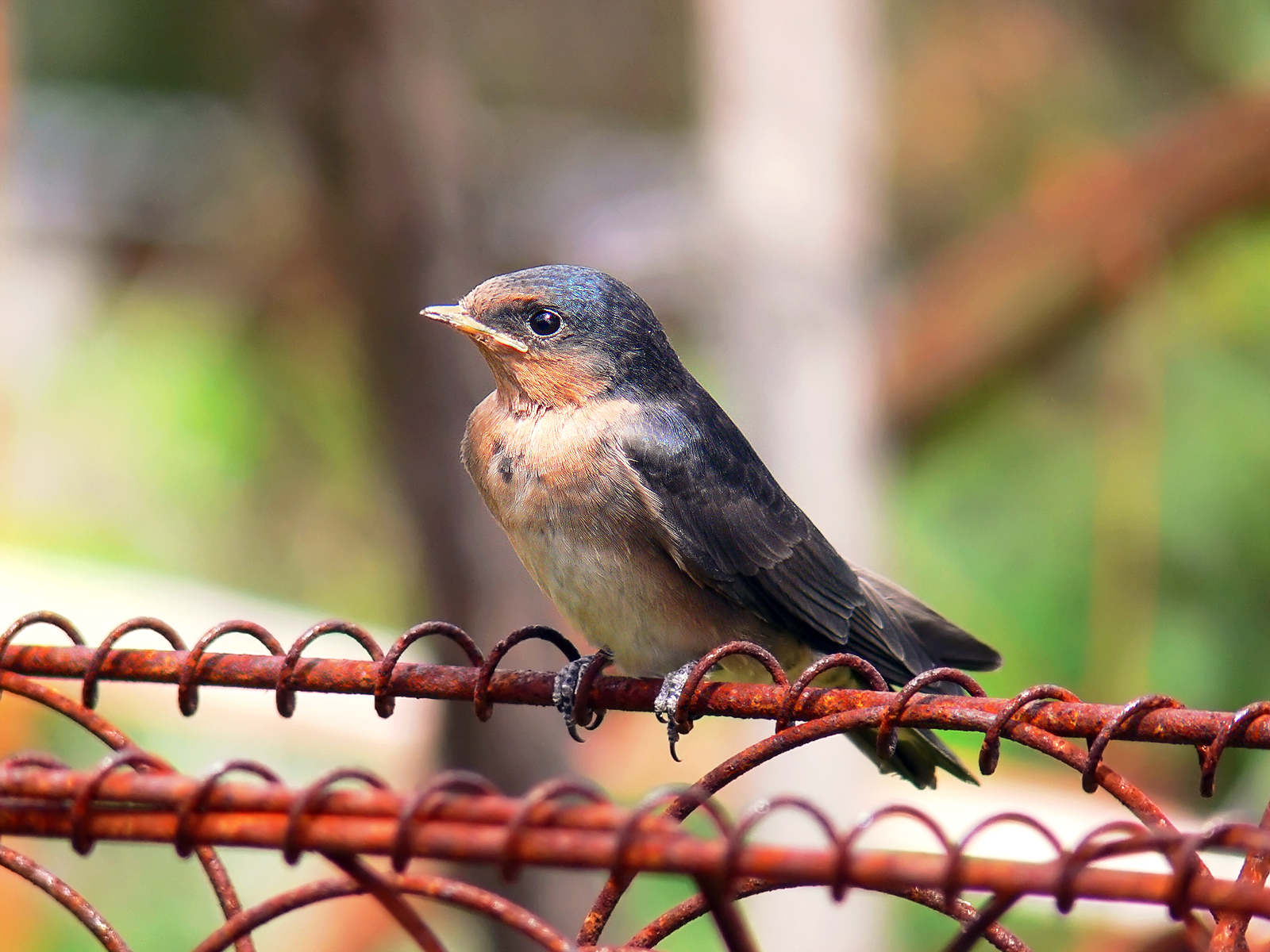
Chick on the day it left the nest

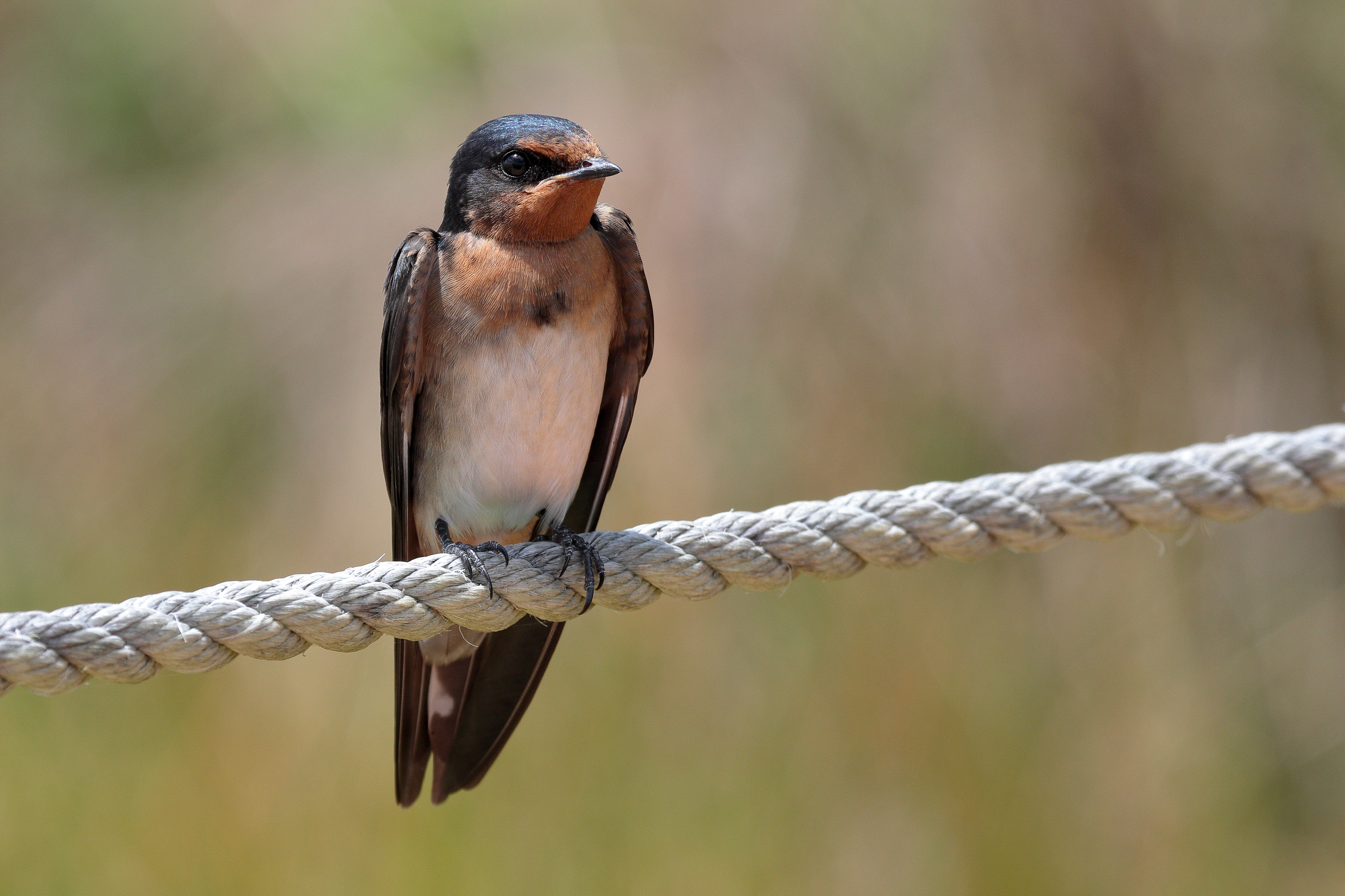
Mareeba wetlands, Atherton Tableland, Queensland, Australia

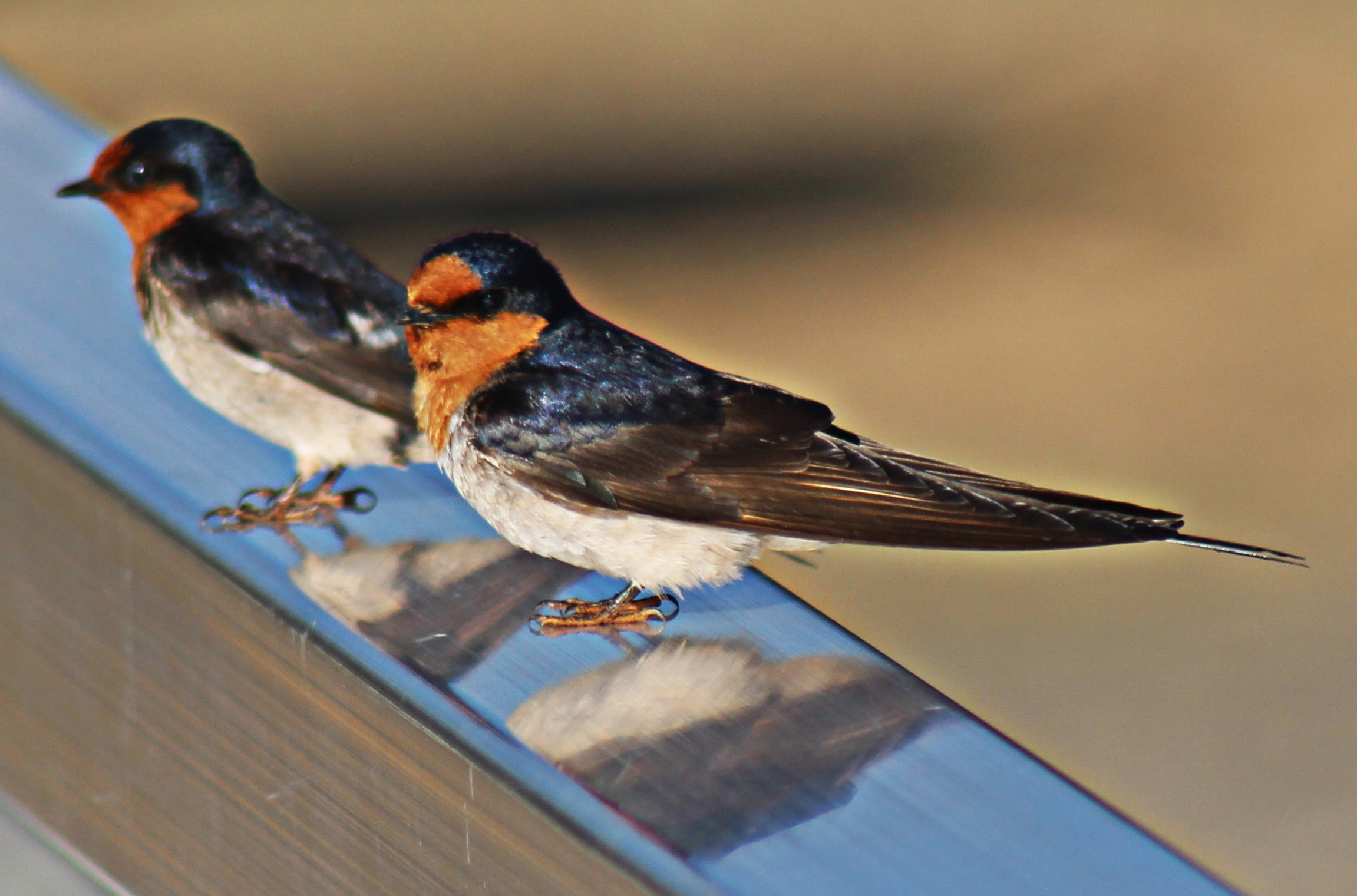
At Bronte Lagoon, Tarraleah, Tasmania

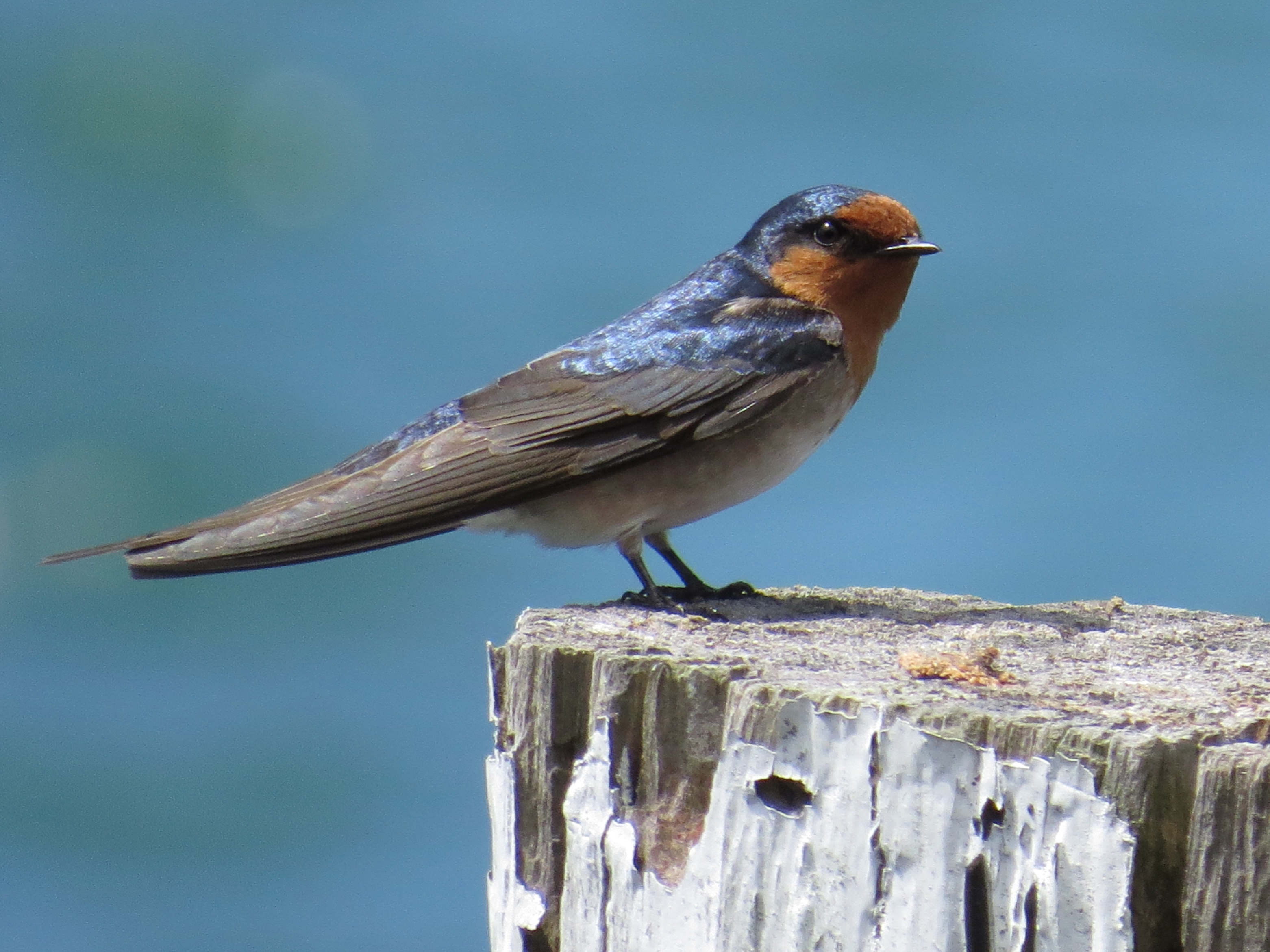
Trinity Inlet, Cairns
