= Nelson (given name) =

Nelson is an English, Scottish, Irish, Northern Irish, Scots-Irish, and Scandinavian given name, more commonly used as a surname.

It is derived from a patronymic name created from the given name "Nell".

== People with the given name Nelson ==
=== A ===
- Nelson Abadía (born 1956), Colombian football manager
- Nelson Abbott (born 1966), American attorney
- Nelson Abeijón (born 1973), Uruguayan footballer
- Nelson Acevedo (born 1988), Argentine footballer
- Nelson Acosta (born 1944), Uruguayan footballer
- Nelson Adams (born 1953), American physician
- Nelson Adams (boxer) (born 1967), Puerto Rican boxer
- Nelson Aerts (born 1963), Brazilian tennis player
- Nelson Agbesi (1939–2016), Ghanaian barrister
- Nelson Agho (born 2003), Spanish footballer
- Nelson Agholor (born 1993), American football player
- Nelson Agresta (born 1955), Uruguayan footballer
- Nelson Akwari (born 1982), American soccer player
- Nelson Alaguich (born 1959), Uruguayan footballer
- Nelson W. Aldrich (1841–1915), American politician
- Nelson W. Aldrich Jr. (1935–2022), American educator
- Nelson Algren (1909–1981), American writer
- Nelson Allen (1933–2005), American politician
- Nélson Almeida (born 1979), Angolan tennis player
- Nelson Alom (born 1990), Indonesian footballer
- Nelson Amadin (born 2001), Dutch footballer
- Nelson Amorim Magalhães (1911–?), Brazilian footballer
- Nelson Mauricio Ancheta (born 1963), Salvadoran footballer and manager
- Nelson Annandale (1876–1924), Scottish zoologist
- Nelson Araujo (born 1987), American politician
- Nélson Domingues de Araújo (born 1972), Brazilian footballer
- Nelson Rodríguez Arévalo, Colombian gang leader
- Nelson Asaytono (born 1967), Filipino basketball player
- Nelson Ascencio (born 1964), Cuban-American actor
- Nelson Asofa-Solomona (born 1996), New Zealand rugby league footballer
- Nelson Atiagli (born 1996), Ghanaian footballer
- Nelson Avila (dancer) (born 1940), Argentine dancer
- Nelson Ávila (Chilean politician) (born 1942), Chilean politician
- Nelson Azeem, Pakistani politician
- Nelson Azevedo-Janelas (born 1998), Belgian footballer

=== B ===
- Nelson Baker (1842–1936), American priest
- Nelson C. Baker, American civil engineer
- Nelson Ball (1942–2016), Canadian poet
- Nelson Ball (rugby union) (1908–1986), New Zealand rugby union footballer
- Nelson Balongo (born 1999), Belgian-Congolese footballer
- Nelson Barahona (born 1987), Panamanian footballer
- Nelson Barbosa (born 1969), Brazilian economist
- Nelson H. Barbour (1824–1905), American writer
- Nelson Barbudo (born 1960), Brazilian politician
- Nelson Barclift (1917–1993), American choreographer
- Nelson Barrera (1957–2002), Mexican baseball player
- Nelson Cárcamo Barrera, Chilean politician
- Nelson Barrere (1808–1883), American politician
- Nelson B. Bartram (1832–1886), American army officer
- Nelson Bascome (1955–2009), Bermudian politician
- Nelson Estupiñán Bass (1912–2002), Ecuadorian writer
- Nelson Batista (born 1962), Cuban dancer
- Nelson J. Beach (1800–1876), American surveyor
- Nelson Becerra (born 1987), Peruvian footballer
- Nelson F. Beckwith (1813–1873), American politician and businessman
- Nelson Benítez (born 1984), Argentine footballer
- Nelson Bentley (1918–1990), American poet
- Nelson Bernal (born 1972), Paraguayan footballer
- Nélson Bertolazzi (born 1966), Brazilian footballer
- Nelson Betancourt (1887–1947), Trinidadian cricketer
- Nelson Gordon Bigelow (1840–1892), Canadian lawyer and politician
- Nelson Boateng (born 1968), Ghanaian sprinter
- Nelson Bolan (born 1990), West Indian cricketer
- Nelson S. Bond (1908–2006), American writer
- Nelson Bonilla (born 1990), Salvadorian footballer
- Nelson Borges (disambiguation), multiple people
- Nelson Bornier (1950–2021), Brazilian lawyer and politician
- Nelson Blanco (born 1999), Salvadorian footballer
- Nelson Bragg (born 1961), American musician
- Nelson Brickham (1927–2007), American intelligence officer
- Nelson Briles (1943–2005), American baseball player
- Nelson Brito (born 1960), Ecuadorian football manager
- Nelson V. Brittin (1920–1951), American soldier
- Nelson Brizuela (born 1950), Paraguayan footballer
- Nelson Broms (1919–2023), American business executive
- Nelson Brown, American curler
- Nelson C. Brown (1885–??), American professor
- Nelson Brownell, American politician
- Nelson Burbrink (1921–2001), American baseball player
- Nelson M. Burroughs (1899–1998), American prelate
- Nelson Burton (disambiguation), multiple people
- Nelson Bustamante (born 1992), Chilean footballer

=== C ===
- Nelson Cabanillas (born 2000), Peruvian footballer
- Nelson Cabrera (disambiguation), multiple people
- Nelson Calzadilla (born 1954), Venezuelan boxer
- Nelson Carmichael (born 1965), American skier
- Nelson Carrero (born 1953), Venezuelan footballer
- Nelson Victor Carter (1887–1916), English army officer
- Nelson Case (1910–1976), American radio announcer
- Nelson Castro (disambiguation), multiple people
- Nelson Catalina (born 1950), American basketball coach
- Nelson Cavaquinho (1911–1986), Brazilian singer
- Nelson Ceaser (born 2001), American football player
- Nelson Cereceda (born 1991), Chilean footballer
- Nelson Chabay (1940–2018), Uruguayan footballer
- Nelson Chai (born 1965), American investment banker
- Nelson Chamisa (born 1978), Zimbabwean politician
- Nelson Chanady (born 1963), American motocross racer
- Nelson Chelle (1931–2001), Uruguayan basketball player
- Nelson W. Cheney (1875–1944), American politician
- Nelson Cherutich (born 1993), Bahraini steeplechase
- Nelson Chia, Singaporean theatre director
- Nelson Chittum (1933–2024), American baseball player
- Nelson Chui (born 1947), Peruvian engineer
- Nelson Clarke (1914–1982), Canadian politician
- Nelson Coates, American production designer
- Nelson Cobb (1811–1894), American judge
- Nelson D. Cole (1833–1899), American army officer and politician
- Nelson Colón, Puerto Rican basketball coach
- Nelson Cooke (1919–2018), Australian cellist
- Nelson M. Cooke (1903–1965), American entrepreneur
- Nelson Cossio (born 1966), Chilean footballer
- Nelson Cowan (born 1951), American psychology professor
- Nelson Cowles (1930–2021), American politician
- Nelson Cragg (born 1978), American film director
- Nelson Crispín (born 1992), Colombian Paralympic swimmer
- Nelson Cruikshank (1902–1986), American policy analyst
- Nelson Cruz (disambiguation), multiple people
- Nelson Cuevas (born 1980), Paraguayan footballer
- Nelson Cupello (born 1951), Brazilian footballer and manager

=== D ===
- Nélson da Conceição (1900–??), Brazilian footballer
- Nelson da Luz (born 1998), Angolan footballer
- Nelson Dantas (1927–2006), Brazilian actor
- Nelson Horatio Darton (1865–1948), American geologist
- Nelson Davidyan (1950–2016), Armenian wrestler and coach
- Nelson Davis (disambiguation), multiple people
- Nelson Dawson (1859–1941), British artist
- Nelson Dean (1899–1939), American baseball player
- Nélson de Araújo (1926–1993), Brazilian writer
- Nelson Debenedet (born 1947), Italian-Canadian ice hockey player
- Nelson DeCastro (born 1969), American comic book artist
- Nelson Delailomaloma, Fijian politician
- Nelson de la Rosa (1968–2006), Dominican actor
- Nelson Dellis (born 1984), American memory athlete
- Nelson del Valle (born 1965), Puerto Rican politician
- Nelson Demarco (1925–2009), Uruguayan basketball player
- Nelson DeMille (1943–2024), American author
- Nelson Dewey (1813–1889), American politician
- Nelson Diale (1936–2015), South African politician
- Nelson Diaz (disambiguation), multiple people
- Nelson Diebel (born 1970), American swimmer
- Nelson Dieppa (born 1971), American boxer
- Nelson S. Dilworth (1890–1965), American farmer and politician
- Nelson Dingley Jr. (1832–1899), American politician and journalist
- Nelson Dladla (born 1954), South African footballer
- Nelson Doi (1922–2015), American politician
- Nelson Dollar (born 1961), American politician
- Nelson Domínguez (born 1957), Cuban water polo player
- Nelson dos Santos (born 1952), Brazilian sprinter
- Nelson Doubleday (1889–1949), American publisher
- Nelson Doubleday Jr. (1933–2015), American businessman
- Nelson Dunford (1906–1986), American mathematician

=== E ===
- Nelson Eddy (1901–1967), American singer
- Nelson E. Edwards (1887–1954), American film historian
- Nelson Effiong (born 1953), Nigerian politician
- Nelson Elder (1923–1983), Northern Irish politician
- Nelson Emerson (born 1967), Canadian ice hockey player
- Nelson Erazo (athlete) (1959–2017), Puerto Rican track athlete
- Nelson Evans (1889–1922), American photographer
- Nelson Évora (born 1984), Portuguese triple jumper

=== F ===
- Nelson Delle-Vigne Fabbri (born 1949), Italian pianist
- Nelson Famadas (1948–2010), Puerto Rican businessman
- Nelson Faria (born 1963), Brazilian guitarist
- Nélson Fernandes (born 1946), Portuguese footballer
- Nelson Fernández (born 1957), Cuban gymnast
- Nelson Ferreira (disambiguation), multiple people
- Nelson Fogarty (1871–1933), Namibian bishop
- Nelson M. Ford (born 1947), American politician
- Nelson Frank (1906–1974), American journalist
- Nelson Franklin (born 1985), American actor
- Nelson Freire (1944–2021), Brazilian pianist
- Nelson Fryer (1818–1896), American farmer and politician
- Nelson Fu (1894–1968), Chinese doctor
- Nelson Fuentes (born 1978), Salvadoran economist
- Nelson Fuson (1913–2006), American physicist

=== G ===
- Nelson Gabolwelwe (born 1977), Botswanan footballer
- Nelson Gaetz (1907–1988), Canadian politician
- Nelson Gaichuhie, Kenyan politician
- Nélson Gama (born 1972), Bissau-Guinean-Portuguese footballer
- Nelson Garner (born 1976), American football player
- Nelson B. Gaskill (1875–1964), American politician
- Nelson Gavit (1810–1876), American manufacturing executive
- Nelson Geingob (born 1982), Namibian footballer
- Nelson George (born 1957), American writer
- Nelson F. Gibbs (born 1938), American politician
- Nelson Gidding (1919–2004), American screenwriter
- Nelson Gill, American politician
- Nelson Glueck (1900–1971), American rabbi and archaeologist
- Nelson L. Goldberg (1930–2005), American telecommunications pioneer
- Nelson Gonçalves (1919–1998), Brazilian singer
- Nelson González (footballer) (born 1988), Argentine footballer
- Nelson González (musician) (born 1948), Puerto Rican tres player
- Nelson Goodman (1906–1998), American philosopher
- Nelson Gooneratne (born 1934), Sri Lankan cricket umpire
- Nelson H. H. Graburn (born 1936), British professor
- Nelson Z. Graves (1849-1930), American businessman
- Nelson Greene (disambiguation), multiple people
- Nelson G. Gross (1932–1997), American politician
- Nelson Guarda (1933–2002), Brazilian rower
- Nelson Guerrero (born 1962), Ecuadorian footballer
- Nelson Gutiérrez (born 1962), Uruguayan footballer

=== H ===
- Nelson Hackett (1810–??), American escaped slave
- Nelson Hahne (1908–1970), American illustrator
- Nelson Hairston (1917–2008), American ecologist
- Nelson Harding (1879–1944), American cartoonist
- Nelson Hardwick (born 1951), American politician
- Nelson Hardy (1905–1993), Australian rugby league footballer
- Nelson Harris (born 1964), American politician
- Nelson Hart (born 1968), Canadian murderer
- Nelson B. Hatch (1879–1956), American football coach
- Nelson Hawks (1840–1929), American inventor
- Nelson Heg (born 1993), Malaysian badminton player
- Nelson Henricks (born 1963), Canadian artist
- Nelson M. Holderman (1885–1953), American army officer
- Nelson K. Hopkins (1816–1904), American lawyer and politician
- Nelson Howarth (1904–1945), English footballer
- Nelson Bunker Hunt (1926–2014), American businessman

=== I ===
- Nelson Ibáñez (born 1981), Argentine footballer
- Nelson Inz (born 1969), American politician
- Nelson Illingworth (1862–1926), Australian sculptor
- Nelson Insfrán (born 1995), Argentine footballer
- Nelson Ishiwatari (born 2005), Japanese footballer
- Nelson Isaac (born 2004), IT engineer

=== J ===
- Nelson Jamili (born 1959), Filipino boxer
- Nelson Javier (born 1985), Dominican badminton player
- Nelson Johnson (born 1948), American lawyer
- Nelson T. Johnson (1887–1954), American ambassador
- Nelson Johnston (born 1990), Cuban footballer
- Nelson Jones (born 1964), American football player

=== K ===
- Nelson E. Kauffman (1904–1984), American bishop
- Nelson Keene (born 1942), British singer
- Nelson A. Kellogg (1881–1945), American athlete and coach
- Nelson Keys (1886–1939), British actor
- Nelson P. W. Khonje (1923–2019), Malawian politician
- Nelson Khumbeni (born 2002), English footballer
- Nelson Kiang, Chinese-American professor
- Nelson King (1914–1974), American disc jockey
- Nelson G. Kraschel (1889–1957), American politician
- Nelson Kuhn (born 1937), Canadian rower
- Nelson Kwei (born 1961), Singaporean conductor
- Nelson Kyeremeh, Ghanaian politician

=== L ===
- Nelson La Due (1831–1900), American politician
- Nelson Lam (born 1968), Hong Kong politician
- Nelson Laurence (born 1984), Seychellois footballer
- Nelson Ledesma (born 1990), Argentine golfer
- Nelson Lee (disambiguation), multiple people
- Nelson Leigh (1905–1985), American actor
- Nelson Leirner (1932–2020), Brazilian artist
- Nelson Lemmon (1908–1989), Australian politician
- Nelson Lemus (1960–1977), Salvadoran religious figure
- Nélson Lenho (born 1984), Portuguese footballer
- Nelson Levy (??–2007), French Polynesian travel executive
- Nelson Lichtenstein (born 1944), American professor
- Nelson Lincoln (1914–2000), American sports shooter
- Nelson Liriano (born 1964), Dominican baseball player
- Nélson Lisboa (1930–2020), Brazilian basketball player
- Nelson Lokombo (born 1999), Canadian American football player
- Nelson López (born 1941), Argentine footballer
- Nelson Seymour Lougheed (1882–1944), Canadian businessman and politician
- Nelson Loyola (born 1968), Cuban fencer
- Nelson Lucas (born 1979), Seychellois sprinter
- Nelson Ludington (1818–1883), American businessman

=== M ===
- Nelson Madore (1943–2020), American politician
- Nelson Mandela (1918–2013), South African politician and activist
- Nelson H. Manning (1832–??), American politician
- Nelson Marcenaro (1952–2021), Uruguayan footballer
- Nélson Marcos (born 1983), Portuguese footballer
- Nelson Margetts (1879–1932), American polo player
- Nelson Mariano (born 1974), Filipino chess player
- Nelson Martin (born 1958), Canadian football player
- Nelson Martinez (disambiguation), multiple people
- Nelson Mason (born 1987), Canadian racing driver
- Nelson Mathews (born 1941), American baseball player
- Nelson E. Matthews (1852–1917), American politician
- Nelson Max, American computer scientist
- Nelson Mazivisa (born 1985), Zimbabwean footballer
- Nelson McCormick (disambiguation), multiple people
- Nelson McDowell (1870–1947), American actor
- Nelson McVicar (1871–1960), American judge
- Nelson Meers (born 1938), Australian politician
- Nelson Willy Mejía Mejía, Honduran military officer
- Nelson Mensah (born 1973), Ghanaian footballer
- Nelson Merced (born 1947), American activist and politician
- Nelson Merentes (born 1954), Venezuelan mathematician
- Nelson Merlo (born 1983), Brazilian racing driver
- Nelson Meurer (1942–2020), Brazilian politician
- Nelson Michael, American researcher
- Nelson A. Miles (1839–1925), American soldier
- Nélson Monte (born 1995), Portuguese footballer
- Nélson Monteiro de Souza (1904–??), Brazilian basketball player
- Nelson Mora (born 1976), Venezuelan swimmer
- Nélson Morais (born 1974), Portuguese footballer
- Nelson Morales (born 1976), Guatemalan footballer
- Nelson Mores (born 1959), Chilean football manager
- Nelson Morgan, American computer scientist
- Nelson Morpurgo (1899–1978), Italian lawyer
- Nelson Morris (1838–1907), American entrepreneur
- Nelson Motta (born 1944), Brazilian journalist
- Nelson Muguku (1932–2010), Kenyan entrepreneur
- Nelson Müller (born 1979), German restaurateur
- Nelson Munganga (born 1993), Congolese footballer
- Nelson Munsey (1948–2009), American football player

=== N ===
- Nelson Navarro (born 1949), Curaçaoan politician
- Nelson Ned (1947–2014), Brazilian singer
- Nelson Ne'e (1954–2013), Solomon Islands politician
- Nelson Nhamussua (born 2001), Mozambican basketball player
- Nelson Nieves (1934–2021), Venezuelan fencer
- Nelson Nitchman (1908–1991), American athletic coach
- Nelson Nogier (born 1996), Canadian ice hockey player
- Nelson Norgren (1891–1974), American athletic coach
- Nelson Norman (born 1958), American baseball player
- Nelson I. Norton (1820–1887), American politician
- Nelson R. Norton (1809–??), American politician

=== O ===
- Nelson Obus (born 1947), American businessman
- Nelson Odhiambo (born 1989), Kenyan cricketer
- Nelson Oduber (born 1947), Aruban politician
- Nelson Ogunshakin, British-Nigerian engineer
- Nelson Olanipekun, Nigerian lawyer
- Nélson Oliveira (born 1991), Portuguese footballer
- Nelson Olmsted (1914–1992), American actor
- Nelson Olveira (born 1974), Uruguayan footballer
- Nelson Ombito (born 1963), Kenyan judoka
- Nelson Onana (born 2000), Belgian field hockey player
- Nelson Oñate (1943–2022), Cuban sports shooter
- Nelson Onono-Onweng, Ugandan bishop
- Nelson Orji (born 2002), Nigerian footballer
- Nelson Orozco (born 2000), Bolivian footballer
- Nelson Oyarzún (1943–1978), Chilean football manager
- Nelson M. Oyesiku, Nigerian neurosurgeon
- Nelson Oyoo (born 1994), Kenyan rugby sevens footballer

=== P ===
- Nelson Silva Pacheco (1944–2025), Colombian footballer
- Nelson Palacio (born 2001), Colombian footballer
- Nelson Panciatici (born 1988), French racing driver
- Nelson Papucci (born 1968), American politician
- Nelson Parraguez (born 1971), Chilean footballer
- Nelson Pass (born 1951), American audio designer
- Nelson Pedetti (born 1954), Uruguayan footballer
- Nélson Pedroso (born 1985), Portuguese footballer
- Nelson Peltz (born 1942), American businessman
- Nélson Pereira (born 1975), Portuguese footballer
- Nelson Pereira dos Santos (1928–2018), Brazilian film director
- Nelson J. Pérez (born 1961), American prelate
- Nélson Pescuma (1945–2006), Brazilian footballer
- Nelson Pessoa (born 1935), Brazilian equestrian
- Nelson Peterson (1913–1990), American football player
- Nelson Philippe (born 1986), French race car driver
- Nelson Phillips (1873–1939), American judge
- Nelson Pinder (1932–2022), American minister
- Nelson Pinedo (1928–2016), Colombian singer
- Nelson Pinto (born 1981), Chilean footballer
- Nelson Piquet (disambiguation), multiple people
- Nelson Pizarro (born 1985), American soccer player
- Nelson Pizarro (Chilean footballer) (born 1970), Chilean footballer
- Nelson W. Polsby (1934–2007), American political scientist
- Nelson D. Porter (1863–1961), Canadian politician
- Nelson Thomas Potter Jr. (1939–2013), American philosopher
- Nelson Poynter (1903–1978), American publisher
- Nelson A. Primus (1842–1916), American artist
- Nelson Proença (1950–2022), Brazilian businessman and politician
- Nelson Prudêncio (1944–2012), Brazilian athlete
- Nélson Purchio (1941–2015), Brazilian footballer

=== Q ===
- Nelson Quan (born 1984), Chinese-American film editor
- Nelson Quiñónes (born 2002), Colombian footballer

=== R ===
- Nelson Rada (born 2005), Venezuelan baseball player
- Nelson Rae (1914–1945), American actor
- Nelson Jair Cardona Ramírez (born 1969), Colombian prelate
- Nelson Ramodike (??–2012), South African politician
- Nelson Ramos (disambiguation), multiple people
- Nelson Rand, Canadian journalist
- Nelson Rangell (born 1960), American jazz musician
- Nelson Rattenbury (1907–1973), Canadian politician
- Nelson Rebolledo (born 1985), Chilean footballer
- Nelson Repenning, American business scholar
- Nelson Ribeiro (1910–1973), Brazilian rower
- Nelson Riddle (1921–1985), American bandleader
- Nelson Riis (born 1942), Canadian politician and businessman
- Nelson Rising (1941–2023), American businessman
- Nelson Ritsema (born 1994), Dutch rower
- Nelson Rivas (born 1983), Colombian footballer
- Nelson Rockefeller (1908–1979), American politician
- Nelson Rodrigues (1912–1980), Brazilian playwright
- Nelson Rodríguez (boxer) (born 1955), Venezuelan boxer
- Nelson S. Román (born 1960), American judge
- Nelson Royal (1935–2002), American professional wrestler
- Nelson Ruiz (born 1949), Venezuelan boxer
- Nelson Somerville Rulison (1842–1897), American bishop
- Nelson Russell (1897–1971), Northern Irish soldier
- Nelson Martínez Rust (1944–2026), Venezuelan bishop
- Nelson Ruttenberg (1893–1959), American lawyer and politician

=== S ===
- Nélson Saavedra (born 1988), Chilean footballer
- Nelson Saenz (born 1965), Cuban taekwondo practitioner
- Nelson Saiers, American artist and mathematician
- Nelson Saldana, American cyclist
- Nelson Samkange (??–2013), Zimbabwean politician
- Nélson Sampaio (born 1992), Portuguese footballer
- Nelson León Sánchez (born 1966), Chilean footballer
- Nelson Ponce Sánchez (born 1975), Cuban illustrator
- Nelson Sanhueza (born 1952), Chilean footballer
- Nelson Sandoval (born 1970), Chilean footballer
- Nelson San Martín (born 1980), Chilean footballer
- Nelson Santana (1955–1964), Brazilian medical patient
- Nelson Santovenia (born 1961), American baseball player
- Nelson Sardelli (born 1934), Italian-Brazilian comedian
- Nelson Sardenberg (born 1970), Brazilian karate fighter
- Nelson Sardinha (born 1966), Angolan basketball player
- Nelson Sargento (1924–2021), Brazilian musician
- Nelson Saúte (born 1967), Mozambican writer
- Nelson Schwenke (??–2012), Chilean singer
- Nelson Searcy (born 1971), American minister
- Nélson Semedo (born 1993), Portuguese footballer
- Nelson Semperena (born 1984), Uruguayan footballer
- Nelson Senkatuka (born 1997), Ugandan footballer
- Nelson Rodríguez Serna (born 1965), Colombian cyclist
- Nelson Serrano (1938–2024), Ecuadorian businessman
- Nelson Setimani (born 1990), South African cricketer
- Nelson Sewankambo (born 1952), Ugandan physician
- Nelson Shanks (1937–2015), American painter
- Nelson Sharpe (1858–1935), American judge
- Nelson Shin (born 1939), Korean film executive
- Nelson Shoemaker (1911–2003), Canadian politician
- Nelson Silva (born 1985), Portuguese politician
- Nelson Silva Pacheco (1944–2025), Uruguayan-born Colombian footballer
- Nelson Simmons (born 1963), American baseball player
- Nelson Simões (born 1972), Brazilian footballer
- Nelson D. Simons (1885–1953), American native leader
- Nelson Sing (born 1995), Timorese footballer
- Nelson Skalbania (born 1938), Canadian engineer
- Nelson Solórzano (born 1959), Venezuelan basketball player
- Nelson Sossa (born 1986), Bolivian footballer
- Nelson Soto (born 1963), Chilean footballer and manager
- Nelson Soto (cyclist) (born 1994), Colombian cyclist
- Nelson Spencer (1876–1943), Canadian merchant
- Nelson Spruce (born 1992), American football player
- Nelson Stacy (1921–1986), American race car driver
- Nelson Stevens (1938–2022), American artist
- Nelson Stokley (1944–2010), American football player
- Nelson Stoll, American sound engineer
- Nelson Stone (born 1984), Papua New Guinean runner
- Nelson Story (1838–1926), American rancher
- Nelson Story Jr. (1878–1932), American politician
- Nelson R. Strong (1862–1930), American politician
- Nelson Suárez (born 1956), Ecuadorian diver
- Nelson Sullivan (1948–1989), American videographer

=== T ===
- Nelson Tapia (born 1966), Chilean footballer
- Nelson Ferebee Taylor (1920–2004), American lawyer
- Nelson Teich (born 1957), Brazilian oncologist
- Nelson Terán (born 1968), Mexican composer
- Nelson Thall (born 1952), Canadian media scientist
- Nelson Thomas, American baseball player
- Nelson B. Tinnin (1905–1985), American politician
- Nelson Toburen (born 1938), American football player
- Nelson Torno (1927–2015), Argentine sports shooter
- Nelson Torres (born 1944), Chilean footballer
- Nelson Townsend (1941–2015), American athletic administrator
- Nelson Trad Sr. (1930–2011), Brazilian lawyer and politician
- Nelson Trad Filho (born 1961), Brazilian politician
- Nelson Wesley Trout (1921–1996), American bishop
- Nelson Trujillo (born 1960), Venezuelan boxer
- Nelson Tyler, American engineer

=== V ===
- Nelson Vails (born 1960), American cyclist
- Nelson Valdez (born 1983), Paraguayan footballer
- Nelson H. Van Vorhes (1822–1882), American politician
- Nelson Vargas (born 1974), American soccer player and coach
- Nélson Vargas (born 1973), Colombian cyclist
- Nélson Veiga (born 1978), Cape Verdean footballer
- Nelson Veilleux (born 1967), Canadian professional wrestler
- Nelson Venkatesan, Indian film director
- Nelson Villagra (born 1937), Chilean actor
- Nelson Vivas (born 1969), Argentinian footballer

=== W ===
- Nelson Wallulatum (1926–2010), Native American chief
- Nelson Wang (born 1950), Chinese-Indian restaurateur
- Nelson W. Ward (1837–1929), American army officer
- Nelson J. Waterbury (1819–1894), American politician and lawyer
- Nelson Weiper (born 2005), German footballer
- Nelson Wheatcroft (1852–1897), English actor
- Nelson E. Whitaker (1839–1909), American businessman and politician
- Nelson Williams (disambiguation), multiple people
- Nelson W. Winbush (born 1929), American educator
- Nelson Wolff (born 1940), American politician
- Nelson Woss, Australian film producer
- Nelson Ikon Wu (1919–2002), Chinese-American writer

=== X ===
- Nelson Xavier (1941–2017), Brazilian actor

=== Y ===
- Nelson Torres Yordán (born 1981), Puerto Rican politician

=== Z ===
- Nelson Zamora (born 1959), Uruguayan runner
- Nelson Ryan Zamora (born 1991), Canadian soccer player
- Nelson Zeglio (1926–2019), Brazilian footballer
- Nelson Zelaya (born 1973), Paraguayan footballer

== Fictional characters ==
- Nelson (Ninjago), a character in Ninjago
- Nelson, a Canada goose in the 2006 Disney animated film The Wild
- Nelson, a ballast tractor in the preschool TV series Thomas & Friends
- Nelson Gabriel, a character in The Archers
- Nelson Lee (detective), a character in various British story papers
- Nelson Muntz, a character in The Simpsons
- Nelson Tethers, a character in Puzzle Agent
- Nelson Van Alden, a character in Boardwalk Empire
- Nelson van Sloan, a character in the 1989 American action comedy movie Speed Zone

== See also ==
- Nelson (disambiguation), a disambiguation page for Nelson
- Nelson (surname), people with the surname "Nelson"
