= Michael Nelson =

Michael or Mike Nelson may refer to:

== Arts and entertainment ==
- Banners (musician), English musician Michael Nelson performing as Banners
- Michael Nelson (novelist) (1921–1990), British novelist
- Michael Alan Nelson (born 1971), writer of several comics from Boom! Studios
- Michael J. Nelson (born 1964), American writer and performer, best known for work on Mystery Science Theater 3000
- Michael James Nelson (born 1979), American comedian, writer and producer
- Michael P. Nelson (born 1966), American writer, teacher and academic
- Mike Nelson (artist) (born 1967), British installation artist

== Politics, government and military ==
- Goodspaceguy (born Michael George Nelson), American perennial candidate
- Michael Nelson (political scientist) (born 1949), American political scientist
- Michael Chaim Nelson, New York City councilman
- Michael R. Nelson, North Carolina politician
- Mike Nelson (Minnesota politician) (born 1954), member of the Minnesota House of Representatives
- Mike Nelson (Montana politician), mayor of Billings, Montana
- Michael A. Nelson (1937–2024), United States Air Force general

== Sport ==
- Michael Nelson (footballer) (born 1980), British footballer
- Michael Nelson (soccer, born 1994), American soccer player
- Michael Nelson (soccer, born 1995), American soccer player

== Fictional ==
- Mike Nelson (character), played by Michael J. Nelson on Mystery Science Theater 3000
- Mike Nelson (Twin Peaks), a character in the TV series Twin Peaks
- Mike Nelson, the lead character (played by Lloyd Bridges) in the TV series Sea Hunt

== See also ==
- Kumantje Jagamara (c.1946–2020), Australian artist, also known as Michael Nelson Tjakamarra and other variations
- Nelson Michael, American disease researcher
- Michael Nielsen (disambiguation)
