= EAP =

EAP or E.A.P. may refer to:

== Organizations ==
- Bureau of East Asian and Pacific Affairs, of the United States Department of State
- E.A. Patras, a Greek sports club
- Engineers Against Poverty
- European Association for Psychotherapy
- European Workers Party (Europeiska arbetarpartiet)
- Hellenic Open University, in Patras, Greece
- EAP, a business school which merged with ESCP to become ESCP Europe
- ICC East Asia-Pacific, of the International Cricket Council

== Science and technology ==
- British Aerospace EAP, a fighter aircraft technology demonstrator
- Electroactive polymer

=== Computing ===
- Enterprise architecture planning
- Extensible Authentication Protocol
- JBoss Enterprise Application Platform
- Early access program, for video games

== Other uses ==
- Early access program, in clinical pharmacology
- Eastern Partnership, an initiative of the EU, member states, and six Eastern European countries
- East Asia and the Pacific
- Emergency action plan, part of emergency management
- Emergency action principles
- Employee assistance program
- Endangered Archives Programme, at the British Library, London, UK
- English for academic purposes
- EuroAirport Basel Mulhouse Freiburg, in Blotzheim, France
