= Association for Consultancy and Engineering =

British business association founded 1913

Association for Consultancy and Engineering (ACE)
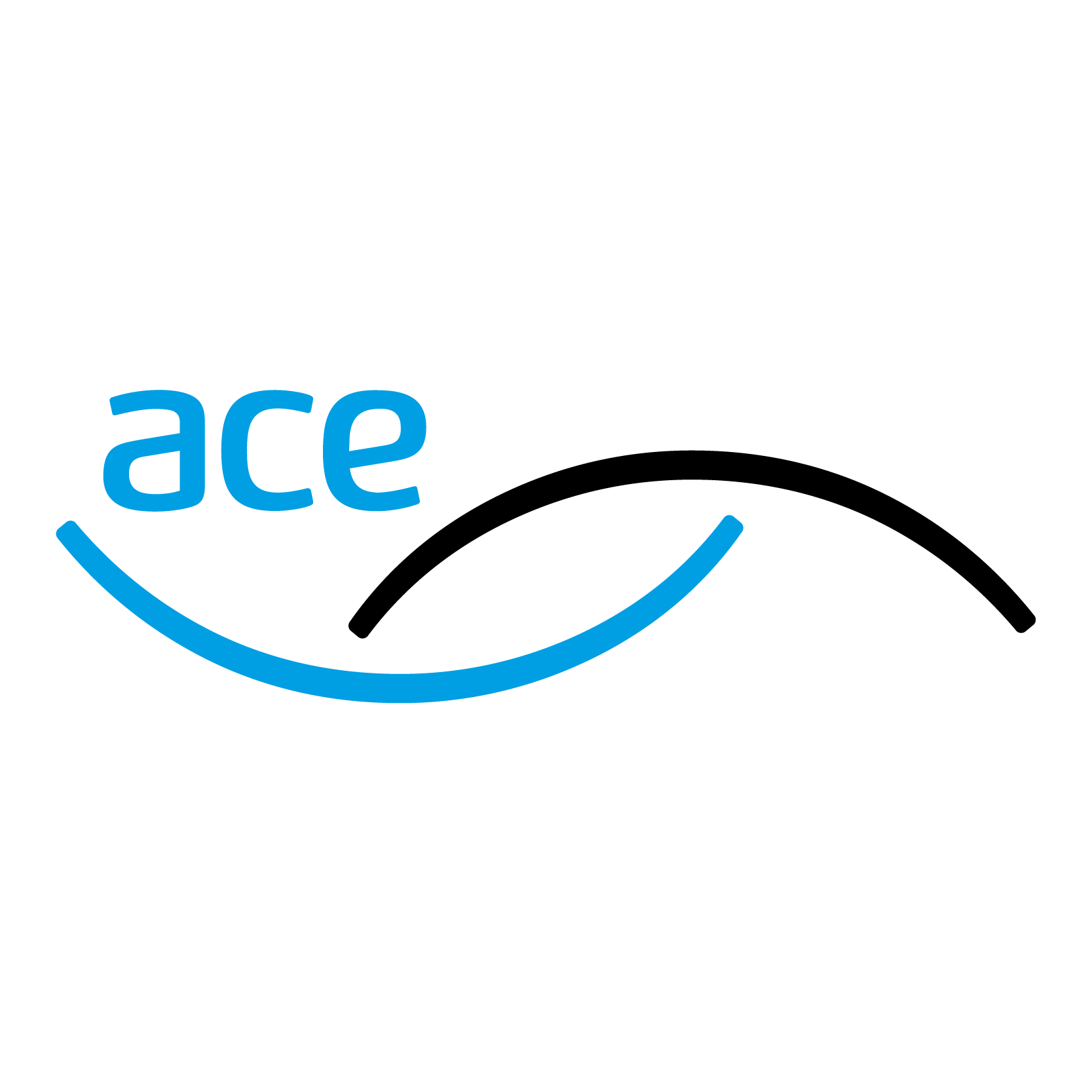
- Type: Not for profit Company Limited by Guarantee
- Industry: consultancy, engineering
- Founded: 1913
- Headquarters: 3 Hanbury Drive, Leytonstone House, E11 1GA, London, United Kingdom
- Area served: infrastructure
- Key people: Sarah Prichard (chairman); Milda Manomaityte (chief executive officer)
- Number of employees: 15–20
- Website: acenet.co.uk

The Association for Consultancy and Engineering (ACE) is a British business association in the field of consultancy and engineering.

ACE represents around 400 member companies, large and small, that provide professional engineering expertise in delivering, maintaining and upgrading economic and social infrastructure across the United Kingdom.

It was established in 1913 as the Association of Consulting Engineers, and was renamed in 2004.

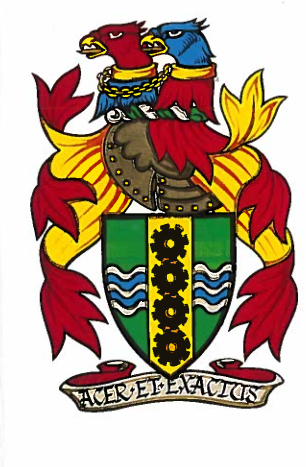
ACE's coat of arms

== Structure ==
Members are typically businesses providing consultancy and other professional services in the field of engineering and the built environment. Their areas of expertise include buildings, transport, utilities, environment and construction and are located throughout the United Kingdom, but many operate worldwide.

The Board is responsible for the key strategic direction and corporate development of the organization. It is made up of representatives from member companies.

The Advisory Group provides ACE with political and industry connections. The group consists of highly positioned individuals from a wide range of backgrounds representing politics, government, academia, legal, and financial institutions, as well as professional and industrial bodies.

== Activities ==
ACE represents its members and promotes their interests to the government and other stakeholders, including the Construction Leadership Council. It also provides opportunities for members to share knowledge and best-practice with each other.

ACE creates and sells standard contracts for their use in construction and engineering projects.

In addition, it organises a number of events, awards, conferences, and campaigns on industry issues on behalf of its members - such as the Future of Consultancy and Net Zero.

=== Groups ===
ACE’s groups across the United Kingdom provide members with an opportunity to engage on a local level. Established groups cover the devolved nations Scotland, Northern Ireland and Wales, there are also further regional groups for the Midlands and the North West.

Groups establish ACE opinion and policy on various issues including Net Zero, procurement, transport, and places. Member forums provide operational advice on HR, business, and legal matters, or represent members based on their size.

=== Emerging Professionals ===
Previously known as the Progress Network, the ACE Emerging Professionals group is for future industry leaders in the first 15 years of their careers. It organises career development opportunities across the UK. It is currently sponsored by ACE member, Mott MacDonald.

=== Technical Apprenticeship Consortium (TAC) ===
ACE provides the secretariat for the Technical Apprenticeship Consortium (TAC) which brings together consultancy and engineering firms to encourage the recruitment and training of technician and degree apprentices.

The consortium has enabled more than 3,000 placements since its formation in 2010 and now offers 16 qualifications across rail design, civil engineering, building services engineering, and transport design.

=== Environmental Industries Commission (EIC) ===
The Environmental Industries Commission (EIC) was founded in 1995 to represent the interests of those companies working in the environmental business sector. It became part of ACE group in 2012.

=== Infrastructure Intelligence ===
ACE produces the magazine Infrastructure Intelligence which publishes six print editions a year. It covers news in the UK's infrastructure sector, as well as provides a platform for expert analysis.

Its website has 26,500 unique visitors a month.

== Research ==
ACE produces research-based reports, mainly to support its ongoing public affairs, stakeholder engagement activity and campaigns, but others cover industry issues.

- Leveling Up: Five Principles for Success explores the steps needed to deliver Leveling Up ambitions.
- Climate Changing the built environment is a series of industry testimonials exploring how our move to Net Zero has already changed roles.
- Consultancy 4.0 is a client-facing project demonstrating how the consultancy sector has changed and how best to engage with it.
- Project Speed is a series of briefings exploring how we can speed up delivery of hospitals, schools, houses and rail.
- Are We Ready? explores how prepared the built environment industry is to meet ambitions for Net Zero carbon emissions.
- Future of the Workplace explores the need to create a thriving workplace culture to attract and retain the best talent.
- Measures for Successful Outcomes explores the five capitals approach to procurement and how it can provide a framework for Government decision-making.
- Scrapping the Levy argues for reform of the Community Infrastructure Levy (CIL) and was written based on Freedom of Information requests to local councils.
- Unlocking Housing argues that only an approach which marries placemaking, meaningful engagement and more power for local councils will solve the housing crisis.
- Piloting Reverse Mentoring shares the results of a nine-month ACE-led cross-industry pilot into reverse mentoring, which is where junior members of staff mentor more experienced decision-makers within a company.
- Funding Roads for the Future argues that the government should change its approach to vehicle excise duty and replace it with a "dynamic road-user charging" system. ACE argues that this system should reflect the social and economic circumstances of road users, as well as the environmental impact of their journey.

== Leadership ==
=== Past chairmen ===
The following individuals have chaired the ACE.

- G Midgley Taylor (1913–16)
- H J Rofe (1916–17)
- Frank Gill (1917–19)
- H J Rofe (1919–20)
- Ernest L Mansergh (1920–21)
- W Vaux Graham (1921–22)
- A M Sillar (1922–23)
- J Mitchell Moncrieff (1923–24)
- Sidney R Lowcock (1924–25)
- Edward W Monkhouse (1925–26)
- W J E Binnie (1926–27)
- S B Donkin (1927–28)
- H Howard Humphreys (1928–29)
- Nicolas G Gedeye (1929–30)
- Alfred H Dykes (1930–31)
- S C Lewis (1931–32)
- J S Afford (1932–33)
- A M Sillar (1933–34)
- J D Watson (1934–35)
- Sir Cyril Kirkpatrick (1935–36)
- Sir William Halcrow (1936–37)
- H P Hill (1937–38)
- Sir Alexander Gibb (1938–39)
- C G DuCane (1939–40)
- E J Buckton (1940–41)
- G M C Taylor (1941–42)
- H J F Gourley (1942–43)
- S B Donkin (1943–44)
- David M Watson (1944–45)
- James R Beard (1945–46)
- G Howard Humphreys (1946–47)
- J F Crowley (1947–48)
- G Kenyon Bell (1948–49)
- T A L Paton (1949–50)
- R W Mountain (1950–51)
- J Duvivier (1951–52)
- Sir Bruce White (1952–53)
- J S Tritton (1955–54)
- T G N Haldane (1954–55)
- J S Tritton (1955–56)
- V A M Robertson (1956–57)
- Bryan Donkin (1957–58)
- J T Calvert (1958–59)
- J M L Bogle (1959–60)
- C L Blackburn (1960–61)
- R L Fitt (1961–62)
- R W Hawkey (1962–63)
- J S Balfour (1963–64)
- Sir Henry Clay (1964–65)
- J Kennard (1965–66)
- J F St G Shaw (1966–67)
- Dr H C Husband (1967–68)
- M E Gibb (1968–69)
- R T Gerrard (1969–70)
- G A Rooley (1970–71)
- D C Coode (1971–72)
- Geoffrey Kennedy (1972–72)
- J R Harrison (1973–74)
- G F B Scruby (1974–75)
- Sir Ralph Freeman (1975–76)
- K F Scott (1976–77)
- Chris Mitchell (1977–78)
- J G Eldridge (1978–79)
- D J Coats (1979–80)
- J W Baxter (1980–81)
- John Haseldine (1981–82)
- W K E Jones (1982–83)
- Paul Martin (1983–84)
- F A Sharman (1984–85)
- Ken Whimster (1985–86)
- G M J Williams (1986–87)
- Keith Best (1987–88)
- Geoffrey Coates (1988–89)
- Tom Smith (1989–90)
- Tom Douglas (1990–91)
- Peter Campbell (1991–92)
- Povl Ahm (1992–93)
- Michael Clark (1993–94)
- Ken Innes (1994–95)
- John Bowcock (1995–96)
- Robbie Reith (1996–97)
- Raymond Cousins (1997–98)
- Tim Foley (1998–99)
- Jim Dawson (1999–2000)
- Brian Clancy (2000–01)
- Tim Simpson (2001–02)
- Rod Macdonald (2002–03)
- David Upton (2004)
- Desmond Scott (2005)
- Martin Nielsen (2006)
- Michael Whitwell (2007)
- Neil Sandberg (2008)
- Geoff French (2009)
- Michelle McDowell (2010)
- Graham Nicholson (2011)
- Paul Hamer (2012)
- Keith Howells (2013)
- Chris Cole (2014)
- Gavin English (2016)
- Mike Haigh (2017)
- Mathew Riley (2018-19)
- Paul Riley (2020)
- Dave Beddell (2021-22)
- Sarah Prichard (2022-Present)

=== Chief executives ===
- Nelson Ogunshakin (2000-2018)
- Hannah Vickers (2018-2021)
- Stephen Marcos Jones (2021-2024)
- Kate Jennings (2024-2026)
- Milda Manomaityte (from March 2026)

== See also ==
- Construction Industry Council
- FIDIC
- Civil Engineering Contractors Association
