= Sophie Castillo =

British indie singer-songwriter (born 1998/1999)

Sophie Castillo (born 1998 or 1999) is a British Latina indie pop singer-songwriter and Internet personality. Influenced by various genres, descriptions of her music vary, but she defines it as "a fusion of Latin, indie, and pop music with a cinematic, dreamy, and ethereal kind of energy." Performing in Spanish and English, she is a prominent member of the Latin music scene in London. She additionally has been labeled a representative of British Latinidad, which she describes in terms of "dual heritage".

== Biography ==
In the 1980s, Castillo's Cuban father, Nelson Batista, and Colombian mother immigrated to West London near Latimer Road, where Castillo was born in 1998 or 1999 and thereafter raised. They exposed her to salsa artists like Grupo Niche, Joe Arroyo, and Fruko y sus Tesos, whilst her uncles Eddie and Lee supported her musical aspirations. As a minor, she listened to more traditional British musicians like the Arctic Monkeys, The Kooks, The Vaccines, Jamie T, and American musicians such as Paramore and The Pretty Reckless. She first began writing indie rock and pop-punk music based on these artists around the age of 15. She began producing songs in GarageBand, with many projects being inspired by her favorite artist Lana Del Rey. Such marked her transition from rock to Latin indie pop. Once she was 18-years-old, she made a concerted effort to incorporate more Latin American music into her own. Further influences include Kali Uchis, Billie Eilish, Celia Cruz, Marc Anthony, Selena, Marina and the Diamonds, Charli XCX, and Black Honey. She draws upon the genres of salsa, indie pop, reggaeton, bachata, bossa nova, baile funk, and R&B.

At a London gig in which Desta French was performing, Castillo met French's bass player Lennyn Sampedro. Together, they produced "Call Me By Your Name". Appealing to fans of The Marías and Kali Uchis, she simultaneously promoted her music on TikTok. In 2022, she released the self-styled "indie bachata" single, which went viral and remains her most popular song on Spotify. In January 2024, she collaborated with TikToker Patrick Vel in representing the British Latino experience, amassing 5.6+ million views. On March 15, she released the EP Venus, which explored femininity and explicitly referenced her experience being Latina. On 20 April, she performed with fellow London-based Latin pop artists Desta French, JSCA, and Milena Sanchez at The Jazz Cafe's Latinas of London event. On 5 June, she opened for J Balvin at The O2 Arena, which she asserted was a good opportunity to publicize British Latinos. In 2025, she launched her first U.S. tour, including a performance at South by Southwest. She explored Brazilian funk/fusion with her EP The Betrayal (2025). In April, she along with Desta French and JSCA represented the growing London Latin pop scene at La Línea music festival.

== Discography ==
=== Albums ===
- Like a Star (2025)

=== EPs ===
- Venus (2024)
- The Betrayal (2025)

=== Select singles ===
- "Love Me That Way" (2019)
- "Call Me By Your Name" (2022)
- "Solo Tú" (2023)
- "Ojos Lindos" (2024)
