= Nelson Ogunshakin =

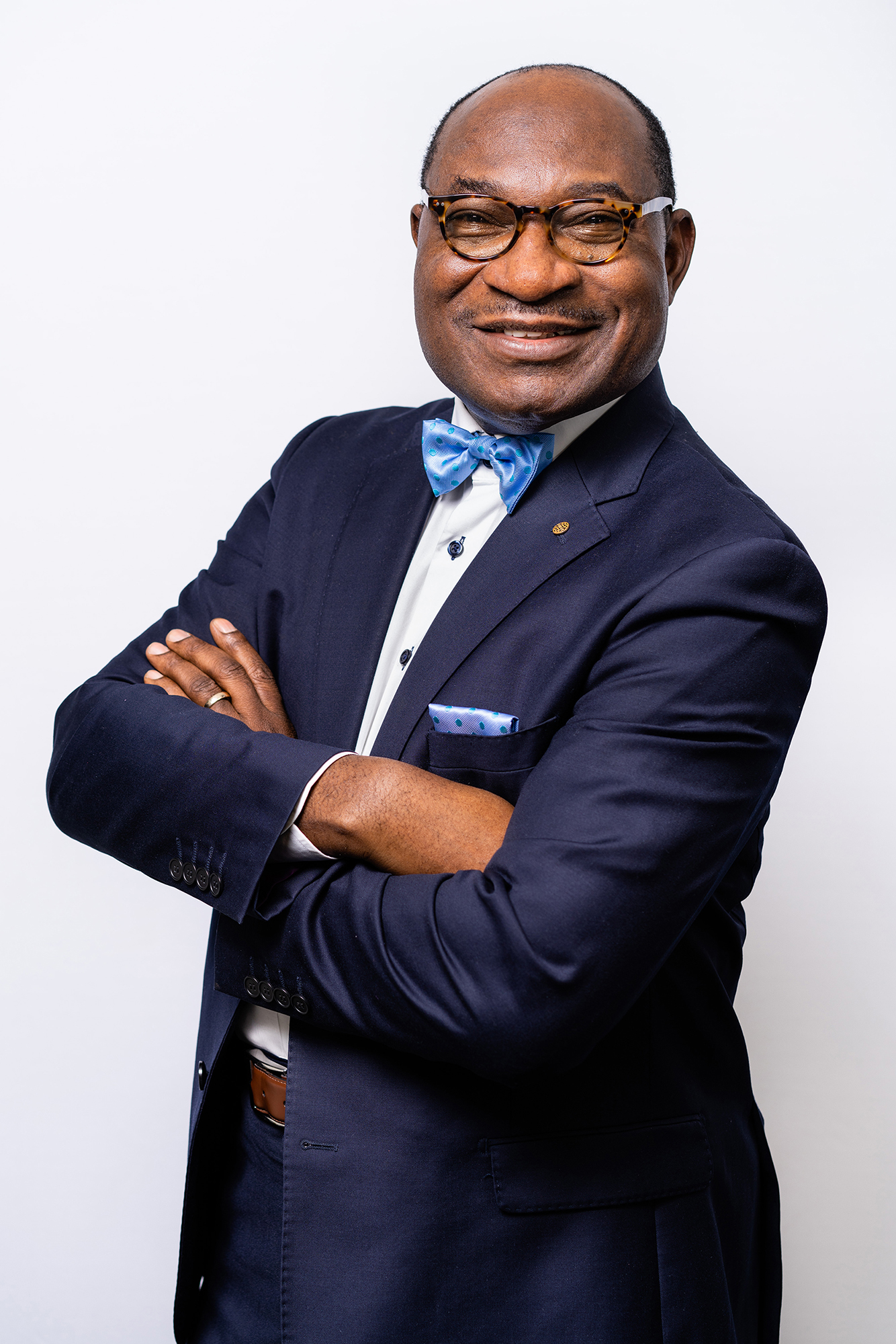
Dr Nelson Ogunshakin OBE, CEO, FIDIC

Olawale Nelson Ogunshakin OBE (known as "Nelson Ogunshakin") is a British engineer and businessman. He is a former chief executive officer of the International Federation of Consulting Engineers (FIDIC) based in Geneva, Switzerland. He was appointed to the board of Transport for London in September 2016.

== Education ==
Nelson Ogunshakin graduated from Aston University in 1985 with a BSc (Hons) in Civil Engineering and obtained a master's degree in Construction & Programme Management at the University of Birmingham. He also completed an MBA in Strategic Management and Corporate Finance from Aston University in 1994. Nelson also gained certifications from the Harvard Business School and INSEAD Business School executive programmes.

== Career ==
Ogunshakin's first position after university was with civil engineering firm Tarmac, later known as Carillion, in 1981. He then moved to Warwickshire County Council, where he became a transport planner. Moving back into consultancy, he joined Rendel Palmer & Tritton consulting engineers and worked on the construction of new motorways in the area, including the M6 toll.

He spent 14 years at the company, where he worked on projects in Hong Kong, Malaysia, Indonesia, South Africa, Canada, Egypt, Africa, the USA and across Europe.

He also held senior positions at WSP Global, AEO Group and in 2004, he became chief executive of the Association for Consultancy and Engineering. At ACE, he oversaw the acquisition and integration of the Environmental Industries Commission into the group and the establishment of the infrastructure industry magazine Infrastructure Intelligence.

=== FIDIC ===
As FIDIC CEO, Ogunshakin has repositioned and reinvigorated the organisation to represent the global consulting engineering sector. He concluded the FIDIC strategic negotiations with most multi-lateral and bi-lateral Development Banks (MDBs) to adopt FIDIC standard form of Contract 2017 to be included in their Standard Procurement Documents used for the delivery in excess of $170 billion infrastructure investment funded by the following MDBs:

- The World Bank (WB)
- African Development Bank (AfDB)
- Asian Infrastructure Investment Bank (AIIB)
- Asian Development Bank (ADB)
- Caribbean Development Banks (CDB)
- Inter-American Development Bank (IDB)
- European Bank for Development & Reconstruction (EBRD)
- Islamic Development Bank (IsDB)

Ogunshakin has led the global expansion of FIDIC business operations by established FIDIC businesses in Geneva, Switzerland, and in Beijing, China. Ogunshakin's introduction of "FIDIC accreditation courses" was met with criticism due to young construction professionals gaining this accreditation quickly.

== Other roles ==
In October 2012, Ogunshakin became co-chair of the National Infrastructure Plan Strategic Engagement Forum, providing strategic direction to the execution of the £350 billion plan, working in collaboration with the then Chief Secretary to the Treasury, Rt Hon Danny Alexander MP and Chief Commercial Secretary to the Treasury, Lord Deighton KBE.

In October 2014, Ogunshakin was appointed to the London Infrastructure Delivery Board by the GLA.

In September 2016, Ogunshakin was appointed to the Transport for London (TfL) board by the Mayor of London, Sadiq Khan, on an initial four-year tenure and then extended to 2024. In June 2018, Ogunshakin was appointed to the board of Crossrail Limited. Ogunshakin is the Chair of the TfL Programmed and Investment Committee (PIC), member of the Audit & Assurance Committee and the Elizabeth Line Committee responsible for commissioning and onboarding the £18 billion Cross Rail investment project into the London Underground operational asset portfolio.

Ogunshakin has also held a number of non-executive roles on the boards of construction/engineering related companies and organisations. He is currently chair of the investment committee at ARIM-Harith, responsible for £250 million worth of investments in West Africa. He was also chair of Thomas Telford Ltd, the commercial arm of the Institution of Civil Engineers (ICE), board member at construction firm, Deal Pride and trustee roles at engineering charities Engineering UK and Engineers Against Poverty (EAP).

In 2021, Ogunshakin was appointed to the Board of Connected Places Catapult.

In October 2023, Ogunshakin was appointed as non-executive director to sit on the board of HS2. As a board member of HS2, Ogunshakin’s duties include ensuring effective governance of the company so that it makes decisions at the right time and properly manages risks, the directing and shaping of the agenda for the company to ensure that it delivers stated priorities, monitoring performance and risk, making choices (or recommendations to ministers) on priorities and ‘risk appetite’ and overseeing healthy relations between HS2 and its stakeholders and commercial partners.

== Professional affiliations ==
Ogunshakin is qualified, registered and proactively active with several professional institutions operating within infrastructure and built environment including the following:

- 1991 elected Chartered Engineer by Engineering Council (CEng)
- 1995 elected member of the Institution of Directors (MIOD)
- 1996 elected member of Chartered Institute of Arbitration (MCIArb)
- 2001 elected Fellow of the Institution of Civil engineers (FICE), UK
- 2006 Accredited Mediator from Centre for Dispute Resolution (CEDR)
- 2008 elected Companion member of Chartered Institute of Management (CMCIM)
- 2010 Liveryman of Worship Company of the Constructor of City of London
- 2021 elected Fellow by the Royal Academy of Engineering (FREng)
- He championed the Royal Academy of Engineering Diversity and Inclusiveness Group 2016-2018
- He was a Royal Academy of Engineering's visiting Professor of Infrastructure finance and development at Aston University, Birmingham, UK 2016 - 2020
- He is also an adjunct professor at Imperial College London.
- 2023 elected Fellow of Nigeria Academy of Engineering (FAEng).

== Awards and honours ==
- Awarded an Officer of the Order of British Empire (OBE) in the Queen's 2010 Birthday honours for his contribution to the engineering and construction industry.
- Honorary doctorate of science & engineering awarded by Aston University in 2011 for his services to engineering.
- Won a Trade Association Forum award for leadership in 2013.
- Awarded Association for Consultancy & Engineering (UK) CEO Lifetime Achievements in 2018.
- Awarded the Association of Consulting Engineers Nigeria (ACEN)' President Golden Jubilee Award for Excellence 2021
- In 2010 and 2018, named one of Britain's 100 most influential black people.
