= Senator Albright =

Senator Albright may refer to:

- George W. Albright (1846–after 1937), Mississippi State Senate
- Ray Albright (1934–2017), Tennessee State Senate
