= List of people from Winter Park, Florida =

The following list includes notable people who were born or have lived in Winter Park, Florida. For a similar list organized alphabetically by last name, see the category page People from Winter Park, Florida.

== Arts and culture ==
- Michael Barimo, singer
- Amanda Bearse, actress
- James Bonamy, country musician
- Carrot Top, comedian
- JC Crissey, film producer
- Tony Curry, visual artist, painter, sculptor
- Sasha De Sola, ballet dancer
- Gina Hecht, actress
- Laeta Kalogridis, screenwriter and producer
- Arielle Kebbel, actress
- Spencer Locke, actress
- Patty Maloney, actress
- Michael James Nelson, writer/actor
- Jo Ann Pflug, actress, graduated from a local high school
- Summer Phoenix, actress
- Albin Polasek, sculptor/educator
- Gamble Rogers, folk musician
- Annie Russell, theatrical actress
- Stephen Stills, musician
- George Weigel, artist

== Business ==
- Meg Crofton, business executive

== Military ==
- Delbert Black, first Master Chief Petty Officer of the Navy
- George Brett, general
- Onslow S. Rolfe, U.S. Army brigadier general

== Politics and law ==
- Kevin Beary, sheriff
- Louis Frey, Jr., congressman
- Stumpy Harris, lawyer
- Paula Hawkins, politician
- Allen Trovillion, politician
- Daniel Webster, politician

== Sports ==
=== Baseball ===
- Orel Hershiser, professional baseball player
- Davey Johnson, professional baseball player

=== Basketball ===
- Rashard Lewis, professional basketball player (Miami Heat)
- Austin Rivers, professional basketball player (Houston Rockets)
- Doc Rivers, basketball coach
- Darius Washington, Jr., professional basketball player

=== Football ===
- Tony Dollinger, NFL player
- Al Latimer, NFL player
- Willie Snead IV, NFL player

=== Golfing ===
- Nick Faldo, golfer and broadcaster
- Matt Kuchar, golfer
- Lauren Thompson, broadcaster

=== Soccer ===
- Dax McCarty, professional soccer player for the New York Red Bulls

=== Swimming ===
- Fred Tyler, swimmer and coach

=== Wrestling ===
- Fergal Devitt, professional wrestler, WWE
