= Amália Barros =

Brazilian politician (1985–2024)

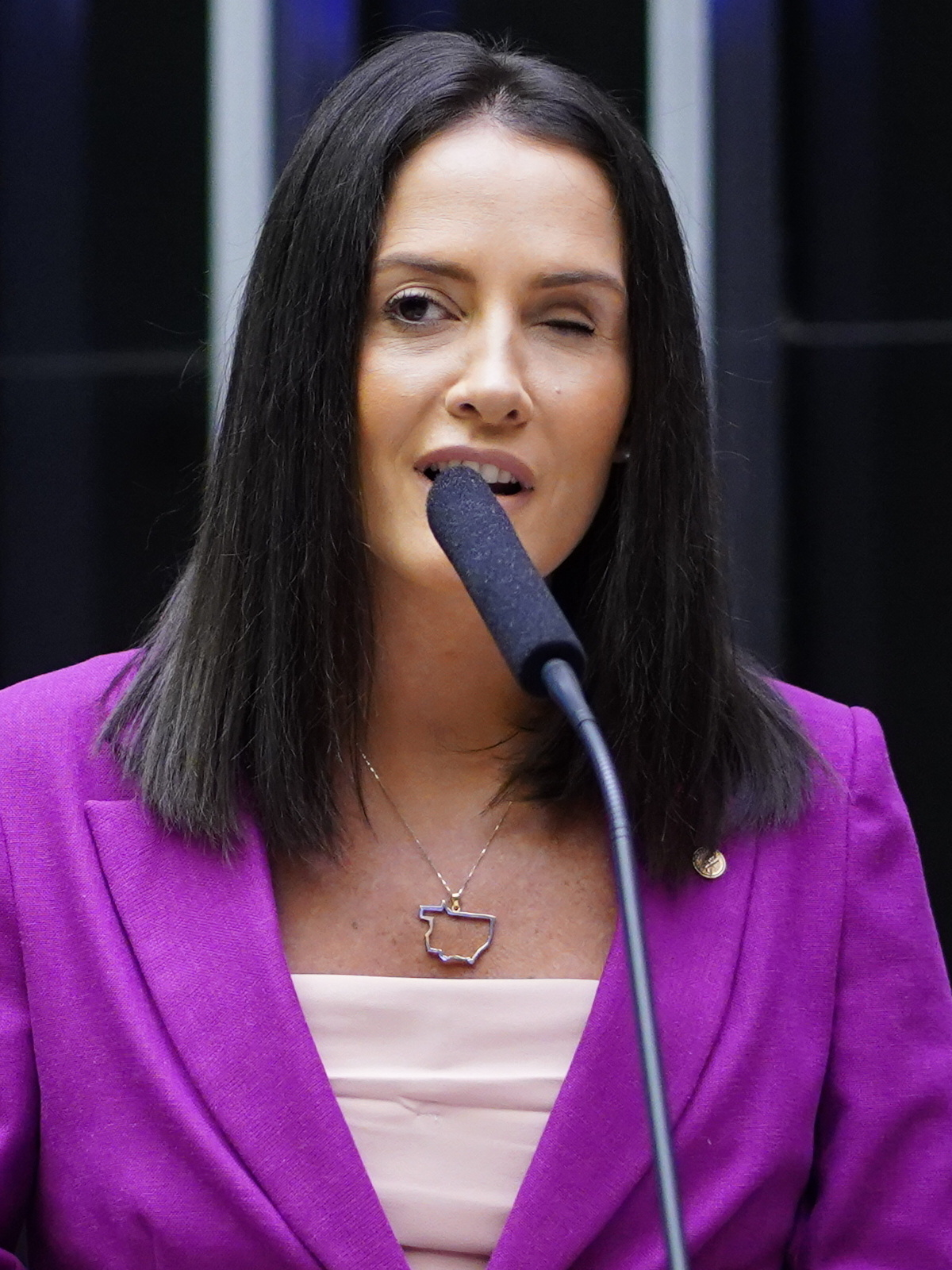
- Barros in 2023

Member of the Chamber of Deputies
- In office 1 February 2023 – 12 May 2024
- Constituency: Mato Grosso

Personal details
- Born: Amália Scudeler de Barros Santos; 22 March 1985 Mogi Mirim, São Paulo, Brazil
- Died: 12 May 2024 (aged 39) São Paulo, São Paulo, Brazil
- Party: PL (2022–2024)
- Spouse: Thiago Boava (m. 2016–2024)
- Occupation: Journalist; politician

Amália Scudeler de Barros Santos (22 March 1985 – 12 May 2024) was a Brazilian journalist and politician, affiliated with the Liberal Party (PL), which she served as a federal deputy for Mato Grosso from 2023 to 2024. She was also a journalism graduate and had worked as a rodeo show narrator.

== Biography ==
Barros was born on March 22, 1985, in Mogi Mirim, as the youngest daughter of Maria Helena and Albino, with an older brother about six years her senior.

At the age of 20, she lost vision in her left eye due to uveitis stemming from toxoplasmosis. Following this, Barros underwent 15 surgeries that were unsuccessful in restoring her vision and resulted in drug-induced hepatitis. Consequently, she opted for the removal of her eye and its replacement with an ocular prosthesis.

According to Barros in her book published in 2021, this experience served as a catalyst for her to consider a future biography and subsequently enter Brazilian politics. Her aim was to champion the cause of monocular individuals so that they would be recognized by the Brazilian government as having a sensory disability, as well as for the inclusion of ocular prostheses on the list of prostheses provided by Brazil's Unified Health System (SUS).

Barros launched her political career in 2022 by running for the position of federal deputy, garnering attention for her candidacy supported by then-first lady Michelle Bolsonaro. She secured election with 70,294 votes.

During her tenure as a congresswoman, Barros was instrumental in inspiring Law 14,126/2021, known as the Amália Barros Law, which recognizes single-eyed vision as a sensory disability in Brazil. The law was officially enacted on 22 March 2021, acknowledging monocular vision as a visual impairment under Brazilian law. Additionally, she founded the Instituto Amália Barros, later renamed the National Institute for Monocular Vision Individuals, aimed at organizing campaigns for fundraising, facilitating the donation of ocular prostheses and scleral lenses, and providing assistance to monocular individuals.

In 2021, Barros authored Se Enxerga!: Transforme desafios em grandes oportunidades para você e outras pessoas, in a comprehensive work spanning 42 chapters detailing her life story and the experiences that led her to advocate for the rights of monocular individuals.

== Death ==
Barros died in São Paulo on 12 May 2024 at the age of 39, after being hospitalized since 1 May following two surgeries to address complications from a pancreatic nodule. While hospitalized, she remained in critical condition in the ICU, undergoing continuous medical interventions, including consultations for additional surgeries due to liver complications.

Following her death, Nelson Barbudo, a Member of the Chamber of Deputies, assumed her position on 21 May 2024, as he was designated as the primary replacement for Barros by the party.

== Electoral history ==
=== Chamber of Deputies ===
Election
Election	Party	Votes	%	Position in the state of Mato Grosso	Result
2022	Liberal Party	70,294	4.06	No. 6	Elected

== Works ==
- 2021: Se Enxerga!: Transforme desafios em grandes oportunidades para você e outras pessoas (translated as: See Yourself!: Transform Challenges into Great Opportunities for Yourself and Others).
