= Gary DeBacker =

Personal information
- Full name: Gary “Big Deal” DeBacker
- Born: October 30, 1974 (age 51) United States

Cycling career
- Sport: Cycling
- Current team: Retired
- Discipline: Bicycle Motocross (BMX)
- Role: Racer
- Rider type: Off Road

Amateur teams
- 1981-1985: JMC Racing Equipment
- 1986-1987: Cyclecraft
- 1987-1988: Mongoose
- 1988-1990: Cyclecraft
- 1990-1991: Schwinn/Volkswagen
- 1992: Revcore/Wilk

Professional teams
- 1992-: Revcore/Wilk
- 1994-?: Tangent
- 1998-: Kovachi Wheels

Gary Wayne DeBacker (b. October 30, 1974 from Woodhaven, Michigan U.S.) is a retired American professional "Mid School" Bicycle Motocross (BMX) racer whose competitive years were from 1980-1999. His greatest achievements occurred during his amateur days, highlighted by four international world championships.

== Getting started in BMX ==
Gary started racing in 1979, when his uncle Dan took him to a BMX track in Woodhaven, MI. He took fourth in his first race as a four-year-old. Once he turned 5, he began to win regularly at the local track, his parents took him to different tracks throughout Michigan. Gary dominated these tracks rather quickly, and it was suggested to his parents that he try to race the national circuit. When Gary turned seven, he received his first full factory sponsorship with JMC Racing. From there, he began to travel the US and World Competing in many national and international events. Four major influences have been cited as his guides in BMX career. The first are Jim and Vera Melton, the husband and wife team that started JMC Racing, which they started first as a bicycle shop and later became a factory bicycle manufacturer. they were Debecker's first sponsor, He said of them:

"Great Pioneer of manufacturing high quality

race bikes. The first to manufacture junior and Mini frames to target the younger kids market. Always focused on staying positive, and believe that having fun was more important than winning. He created a family atmosphere within his team members."

Another influence was another husband and wife team that ran a small but highly respected BMX bicycle manufacturer; Joe and Betty Martino of Cycle Craft. They were another long term sponsor and another quasi family of his:

A second set of parents for all their team members. Being a member of Cyclecraft was like being part of a family.

They manufactured high quality race frames and introduced the "Gary DeBacker Lite" signature race frames in 1987."

== BMX racing career milestones ==
Note: Professional first are on the national level unless otherwise indicated.

Milestone	Event Details
Started Racing:	In 1979 at the age of four years. His uncle took him to an old motocross track so the father could race his motorcycle. He found most of the track being used by bicycle motocross racers. Angry, he went to complain to the track operator. Meanwhile, four year old Gary was fascinated by the BMXers and he knew what he wanted to do was race BMX and he told his father mother when he returned home.
Sanctioning Body:	ABA and NBL
First race bike:	
First race result:	Fourth
First win (local):	
First sponsor:	Late 1981 JMC Racing
First national win:	In 5 year old class† at the American Bicycle Association (ABA) Great Lakes National in Lansing, Michigan on August 3, 1980.
Turned Professional:	March 1992
First Professional/Junior Men race result:	Third Place in Superclass (formerly "B" pro) at the National Bicycle League (NBL) Pro Series National at South Park, Pennsylvania on July 4, 1992.
First Professional win:	In "A" pro at the American Bicycle Association (ABA) Midwest Nationals in Rockford, Illinois in July 1992.
First Junior Men/Pro* race result:	"First Professional race result".
First Junior Men/Pro win:	See "First Professional win".
Retired:	1999

†There was no proficiency classes (Novice, Expert etc.) at five-year-old level.
*In the NBL it is "B"/Superclass/"A" pro (beginning with 2000 season); in the ABA it is "A" pro.
**In the NBL it is "A" pro (Elite men); in the ABA it is "AA" pro.

=== Career factory and major bike shop sponsors ===
Note: This listing only denotes the racer's primary sponsors. At any given time a racer could have numerous ever changing co-sponsors. Primary sponsorships can be verified by BMX press coverage and sponsor's advertisements at the time in question. When possible exact dates are given.

==== Amateur/Junior Men ====
- JMC (James Melton Cyclery) Racing Equipment: Late 1981-July 1985. JMC went out of business in July 1985.
- Cyclecraft: Early 1986-December 27, 1987. Debacker went into a brief retirement after JMC went out of business in July 1985 but returned to competition by early 1986.
- Mongoose Bicycles: December 27, 1987-Late September 1988. DeBacker was picked up by Mongoose on the same day and right after the NBL Christmas Classic.
- Cyclecraft: Late September 1988-December 1990. After less than a year at mongoose, DeBacker was back at Cyclecraft.
- Schwinn/Volkswagen: December 1990-December 29, 1991. The last day of the 1991 edition of the NBL Christmas Classic nationals was his last race for this sponsor.
- Revcore/Wilk: Early January 1992-(through September 1993) DeBacker would turn pro with these sponsors.

==== Professional/Elite Men ====
- Revcore/Wilk: Early January 1992-(through September 1993)
- Tangent: August 1994-
- Kovachi Wheels: 1998-1999

=== Career bicycle motocross titles ===
Note: Listed are District, State/Provincial/Department, Regional, National, and International titles in italics. "Defunct" refers to the fact of that sanctioning body in question no longer existing at the start of the racer's career or at that stage of his/her career. Depending on point totals of individual racers, winners of Grand Nationals do not necessarily win National titles. Series and one off Championships are also listed in block.

==== Amateur/Junior Men ====
National Bicycle Association (NBA)

- None

National Bicycle League (NBL)

- 1980 5 Novice Michigan State Champion
- 1981 6 Expert National No.1
- 1986 11 Expert Grandnational Champion
- 1986 11 Expert National No.1
- 1987 12 Expert & 12 Cruiser Vision World Cup Champion
- 1987 12 Expert and 12 Cruiser Grandnational Champion
- 1987 12 Expert & 12 Cruiser National No.1
- 1989 14 Expert Grandnational Champion
- 1989 14 Expert National No.1
- 1990 15 Cruiser Grandnational Champion

American Bicycle Association (ABA)

- 1981, 1982 Michigan District #1 (Mich-1) No.1
- 1982 7 Expert Northeastern Gold Cup Champion
- 1988 Michigan District #4 (Mich-4) Cruiser No.1

United States Bicycle Motocross Association (USBA)

- None

International Bicycle Motocross Federation (IBMXF)*

- 1981 6 & Under Expert International Champion
- 1983 8 Expert World Champion
- 1986 11 Expert Murray World Cup V Champion
- 1987 12 Boys World Champion
- 1989 15 Expert World Champion

Fédération Internationale Amateur de Cyclisme (FIAC)*

- 1988 14 Boys No.3
- 1989 15 Boys World Champion
- 1990 16 Boys World Champion

Union Cycliste Internationale (UCI)*

- None

*See note in professional section

==== Professional/Elite Men ====
National Bicycle Association (NBA)

- None (defunct)

National Bicycle League (NBL)

- None

American Bicycle Association (ABA)

- None

United States Bicycle Motocross Association (USBA)

- None (defunct)

International Bicycle Motocross Federation (IBMXF)*

Fédération Internationale Amateur de Cyclisme (FIAC)*

- None (FIAC was an organization for amateur racing.)

Union Cycliste Internationale (UCI)*

*Note: Beginning in 1991 the IBMXF and FIAC, which was the amateur cycling leg of the UCI, had been holding joint World Championship events as a transitional phase in merging which began in earnest in 1993. Beginning with the 1996 season the IBMXF and FIAC completed the merger and both ceased to exist as independent entities being integrated into the UCI. Beginning with the 1996 World Championships held in Brighton, England the UCI would officially hold and sanction BMX World Championships and with it inherited all precedents, records, streaks, etc. from both the IBMXF and FIAC.

Pro Series Championships and Invitationals

=== Notable accolades ===
- Named 10th out of 21 racers deemed BMX's Hottest Amateurs in 1988 from a BMX Plus! poll of seven team managers which included Don Crupi of MCS, Mike Seevers of GT, Yvonne Shoup of Free Agent, Dave Custodero of Mongoose, Mike Donell of Revcore, Bill Nelson of Robinson and Racer/Team Manager of Diamond Back Harry Leary.

=== Miscellaneous and Trivia ===
- On September 19, 1982 in Waterford, Michigan during a 1982 ABA Leukemia "Race for Life" event that was memorial race dedicated to the memory of Todd Kingsbury (The Todd Kingsbury Memorial Race), a boy who had died of leukemia in 1981, seven-year-old Gary DeBacker gave his 1981 Michigan District #1 No.1 trophy he won to Bob Kingbury, the deceased boy's father because if Todd did not stop racing due to his illness, he would have been Michigan District #1 champion and not him.

== BMX magazine covers ==
Note: (defunct) denotes that the magazine was out of business before the career of the racer started.

Bicycle Motocross News:

- None (defunct)

Minicycle/BMX Action & Super BMX:

- December 1988 Vol.15 No.12 (SBMX) Last issue of Super BMX/Freestyle ever published.

Bicycle Motocross Action & Go:

- None

BMX Plus!:

- December 1983 Vol.6 No.11* In top inset in the extreme lower right corner in JMC uniform. Greg Hill in GT Racing uniform is in the center; to the left Stu Thomsen in Redline livery. Also present is Nelson Chanady in GT Racing jersey to the right and behind Hill, Tim Judge in Hutch colors and to Thomsen's right and others at beginning of national banner presentation at the start of the 1983 IBMXF BMX World Championships. Brian Patterson is the main image.

*Due to a change of ownership, BMX Plus! did not publish a May 1983 issue.

Total BMX:

- None

Bicycles and Dirt:

- None

Snap BMX Magazine & TransWorld BMX:

- None

NBA World & NBmxA World (The official NBA/NBmxA membership publication):

Bicycles Today & BMX Today (The NBL official membership publication under two names):

- June/July? 1991

ABA Action, American BMXer, BMXer (The ABA official membership publication under three names):

USBA Racer (The official ABA membership publication):

== BMX press magazine interviews and articles ==
- "Up front with DeBacker" BMX Plus! November 1991 Vol.14 No.11 pg.38
