= Thiago Boava =

Brazilian politician (born 1982)

Member of the Chamber of Deputies
- Assuming office 1 February 2027
- Constituency: Mato Grosso

Personal details
- Born: Thiago dos Santos Boava; 23 May 1982 (age 44) São Paulo, Brazil
- Party: PL
- Spouse: Amália Barros (m. 2016; died 2024)

Thiago dos Santos Boava (born 23 May 1982) is a Brazilian politician who was elected member of the Chamber of Deputies in 2026. He was married to Amália Barros from 2016 until her death in 2024.
