= Nelson Barbudo =

Brazilian politician

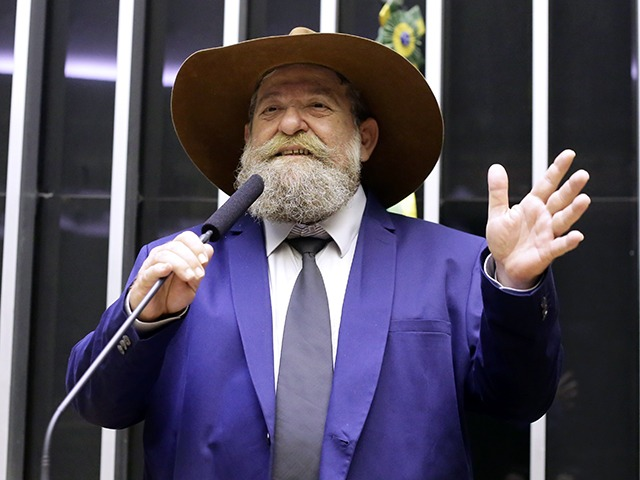

Member of the Chamber of Deputies
- Incumbent
- Assumed office 21 May 2024
- In office 1 February 2019 – 1 February 2023
- Constituency: Mato Grosso

Councillor of Alto Taquari
- In office 1 January 2005 – 31 December 2008
- Constituency: At-large

Personal details
- Born: 14 February 1960 (age 65); Monte Aprazível, São Paulo, Brazil
- Political party: PL (2022–present); UNIÃO (2022); PSL (2018–2022); DEM (2007–2018); PFL (2003–2007)

Nelson Ned Previdente (14 February 1960), better known as Nelson Barbudo is a Brazilian politician and rural producer, affiliated to the Liberal Party (PL).

== Biography ==
Born in Monte Aprazível, in the interior of the state of São Paulo, Barbudo began his political career in the city of Alto Taquari, a city located in the state of Mato Grosso. He first ran for councillor of Alto Taquari in 2004 and succeeded, being elected with around 281 votes. He tried to run for re-election as a councillor in the 2008 Alto Taquari elections, but his candidacy was rejected by the Superior Electoral Court (TSE).

After these two electoral disputes and a long period without running for any other elected office, Barbudo once again gained notoriety through content disseminated via social networks defending the positions of the then federal deputy Jair Bolsonaro. As a result, he ended up being the most voted federal deputy in the state of Mato Grosso in the 2018 elections. He ran in the 2022 Brazilian general election for re-election as a federal deputy, but lost the race, staying as an alternate of the party in the state. With the death of the federal deputy Amália Barros on 12 May 2024, it was expected for him to take her seat definitively, as he is the first alternate of the Liberal Party in the state of Mato Grosso. He took office on 21 May 2024. Barbudo is Roman Catholic.

== Electoral history ==
=== Chamber of Deputies ===
Election
Election	Party	Votes	%	Position in the state of Mato Grosso	Result
2022	Liberal Party	53,285	3.08	No. 10 (Note: His position on the list of elected and non-elected candidates in the 2022 parliamentary elections in the state of Mato Grosso. The state elects 8 federal deputies.)	Not elected (Note: 1st alternate of the Liberal Party on Mato Grosso. He took office as a member of the Chamber of Deputies on 21 May 2024 after the death of Amália Barros.)
2018	Social Liberal Party	126,249	8.52	No. 1	Elected

=== Municipal Chamber of Alto Taquari, Mato Grosso ===
Election
Election	Party	Votes	%	Position in the city of Alto Taquari	Result
2004	Liberal Front Party	281	7.75	No. 1	Elected
