= George W. Albright =

American politician (1846–1944)

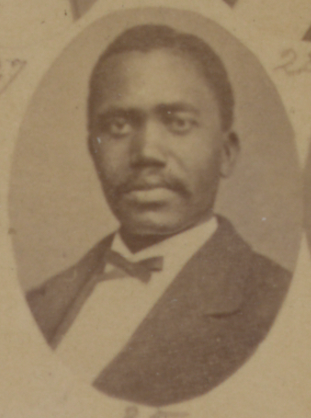
- 1874 photo by E. Von Seutter

Member of the Mississippi State Senate from the 25th district
- In office January 20, 1874 – January 1878
- Preceded by: Henry M. Paine
- Succeeded by: A. M. West

Personal details
- Born: August 15, 1846 near Holly Springs, Mississippi
- Died: 1944 (aged 97–98)
- Party: Republican

George Washington Albright (August 15, 1846 - 1944) was an American farmer, educator, and politician who was born enslaved in the U.S. state of Mississippi. A Republican, Albright represented the 25th District (consisting of Marshall County) in the Mississippi State Senate from 1874 to 1879 during the end of the Reconstruction Era. In 1873, Albright won his Senate seat by defeating the Democrat E. H. Crump, a leader in the Ku Klux Klan. Albright served in the 1874-1875 session and the 1876-1877 session.

After he was emancipated from slavery, Albright worked as a field hand. His father, who was sold to an owner in Texas shortly before the American Civil War, joined the Union Army and was killed at the Battle of Vicksburg in Mississippi. During the War, Albright was a member of the Union League, which promoted loyalty to the Republican Party and spread news of the Emancipation Proclamation among still enslaved people. After the war, he attended a school run by Sheriff Nelson Gill.

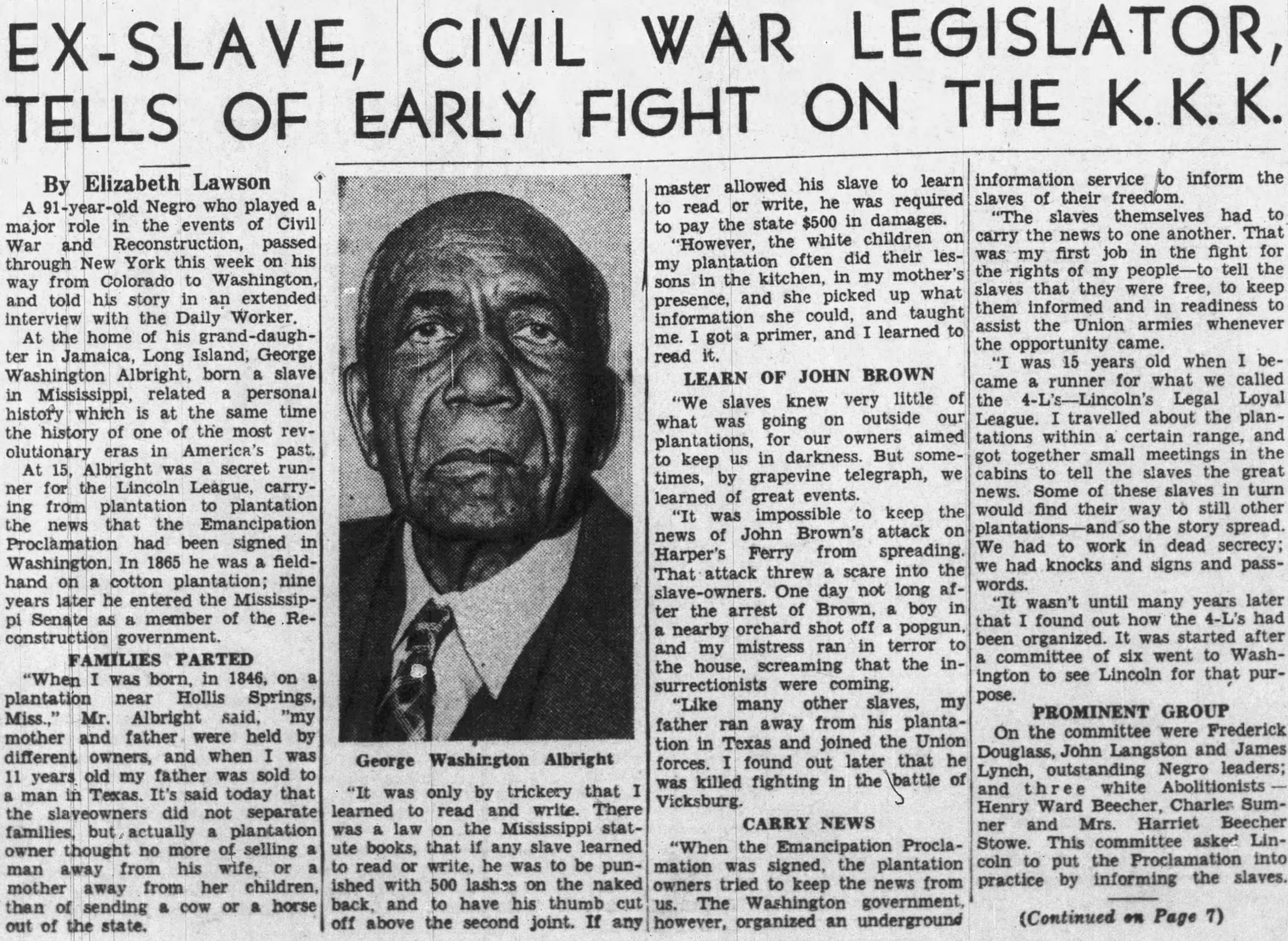
Albright's interview with the Daily Worker, June 18, 1937

Albright married a white teacher and became a teacher himself. When he narrowly escaped with his life in a confrontation with Klansmen, Albright moved to Chicago, Kansas, and later Colorado. In 1937, in an interview with the communist Daily Worker newspaper, he hailed the Communist Party USA for nominating a Black man, James W. Ford, for the vice-presidency in the 1936 presidential election.

In 2021, DeeDee Baldwin, a research librarian heading the Against All Odds archival history effort on African American legislators in Mississippi during and after the Reconstruction era, was part of a recorded talk and slide presentation with Karen Burch, one of Albright's descendants.

== See also ==
- List of African-American officeholders during Reconstruction
