= Peter Campbell (engineer) =

British structural engineer

- Born: January 1932; Coulsdon, Surrey, England
- Died: 1 May 2021 (aged 89)
- Education: Purley High School for Boys, Brixton School of Building now London South Bank University
- Spouse: Pam Campbell
- Engineering career
- Discipline: Structural engineer
- Institutions: Institution of Structural Engineers
- Practice name: CampbellReith.

Peter Campbell (born January 1932 in Coulsdon, Surrey-died 1 May 2021) was a British structural engineer.

== Early life and education ==
Campbell grew up in Coulsdon, Surrey and went to Purley High School for Boys. He attended the Brixton School of Building (now London South Bank University) from 1948 to 1951. In 1951 he passed the graduate examination of the Institution of Structural Engineers and immediately joined Arup. After two years military service he studied for a DIC in concrete technology at Imperial College London

== Career ==
Campbell and Ian Reith formed Campbell Reith and Partners in 1960. Projects which he personally supervised were a new Government Centre in Mauritius, the IBRD 1st education project in Trinidad and Tobago, Slough Estates HQ, the West Stand at the Oval, the Japanese Embassy in London and the HQ for Southern Water in Worthing. From 1962 to 1968 Campbell taught the theory of structures at Regent Street Polytechnic London. He invented a flexible cladding device and in 1981 established a museum of concrete at the Chalk Pitts Museum at Amberley in West Sussex. Peter retired from Campbell Reith as a senior partner in 1992. He was Chairman of the Association of Consulting Engineers (now the Association for Consultancy and Engineering) 1991-92 and was President of the Institution of Structural Engineers in 1988-89.

== Awards and honours ==
- Freeman of the City of London and Liveryman of the Worshipful Company of Paviors
- Justice of the Peace in the Surrey Division of Reigate

== Selected publications ==
- Learning from Construction Failures
