= Nelson Cárcamo Barrera =

Chilean politician

Nelson Cárcamo Barrera is the current governor of the Chilean province of Antártica Chilena.
