= Nelson Martínez =

Nelson Martinez may refer to:

- Nelson Martinez (baritone) (born 1981), Cuban-American operatic baritone
- Nelson Martínez (footballer) (born 1991), Ecuadorian footballer
- Nelson Martínez (politician) (1951–2018), Venezuelan politician
- Nelson Martínez Rust (1944–2026), Venezuelan prelate of the Roman Catholic Church
- Nelson Martinez (soccer) (born 2001), American soccer player
