= Nelson Atiagli =

Ghanaian footballer

Personal information
- Date of birth: 18 January 1996 (age 30)
- Place of birth: Accra, Ghana
- Height: 1.78 m (5 ft 10 in)
- Position: Defender

Team information
- Current team: Terracina

Youth career
- 2010–2011: Kuntunse Great United

Senior career*
Years	Team	Apps	(Gls)
2012–2013	Tema Youth	6	(0)
2014–2022	Latina	115	(0)
2022–	Terracina	0	(0)
- * Club domestic league appearances and goals as of 24 April 2022

Nelson Atiagli (born 18 January 1996) is a Ghanaian professional footballer who plays as a defender for Italian Eccellenza Lazio club Terracina.

He previously played for Ghanaian club Tema Youth but he left to join Latina U19 ahead of the 2014–15 Campionato Primavera 1 season.

== Career ==
=== Latina Calcio ===
Atiagli moved to Latina in the 2014–15 season but he did not make a senior team appearance until the 2018–19 season when played a total of 15 games for the club in the Serie D Girone G. In the following 2019–20 season, he made a total of 14 appearances for Latina as a midfielder. During a press conference in 2015 General Manager Fabio Napolitano confirmed that Latina had successfully registered Atiagli for the league. In September 2019 the midfielder underwent a surgery at Latina to remove three abdominal hernias.
