= Nelson Searcy =

American evangelical minister and author (born 1971)

- Born: October 3, 1971 (age 54)
- Occupations: Pastor, Author
- Website: www.ChurchLeaderInsights.com

Nelson Searcy (born October 3, 1971) is an American evangelical minister and author. He is the founder and lead pastor of The Journey Church, an evangelical Christian church in New York City and Boca Raton, Florida. Founded in 2002, The Journey Church has grown to include multiple campuses across metro New York City (in Manhattan, Queens, and Staten Island) and a campus in Boca Raton, Florida. The church continues to grow and innovate and serve the people of metro New York City and beyond. The Journey has been featured in articles in Time Magazine, Rolling Stone, and The New York Times. In addition, he is an author of many Christian books on church leadership and numerous resources for pastors and other church leaders. He is also the founder of Church Leader Insights, an organization that provides training and resources for pastors.

== Biography ==
=== Personal life and education ===
Nelson Searcy grew up in North Carolina.

Searcy met his wife, Kelley, on a blind date while they were in college and the two were married in 1994. They have lived in North Carolina, Southern California, Manhattan, and currently reside in Boca Raton.

Searcy received a Bachelor of Science degree in psychology and a Bachelor of Arts degree from Gardner-Webb University in Boiling Springs, North Carolina. He received his Master of Divinity (M.Div.) from Duke University and has pursued additional study at North Carolina State University, Gardner-Webb University School of Divinity, and Southern Baptist Theological Seminary.

=== Early Ministry ===
After becoming a Christian while in college, Searcy entered full-time ministry in 1990.

Searcy served with the Baptist State Convention of North Carolina and pastored churches in North Carolina from 1990 to 1999.

Searcy went on staff with Rick Warren in 1999. There he was the founding director of the Purpose Driven Community at Saddleback Church, with more than 5,000 member churches, and a key architect for Warren's PurposeDriven.com.

=== The Journey Church ===
Searcy and his wife, Kelley, moved to New York City in late 2001 to start The Journey Church of the City.

On Easter Sunday of 2002 a handful of people gathered in two Manhattan locations as The Journey launched weekly services. From the very beginning, The Journey was "one church that met in multiple locations" – on the Upper West Side on Sunday mornings and in the East Village on Sunday evenings.

From there, The Journey has steadily grown in numbers and ministries. Over the years the church has met in comedy clubs, church basements, off-Broadway theaters, public schools, hotel ballrooms and even in larger concert venues. As of July, 2012, The Journey meets in two locations in the Metro New York area.

Most recently, The Journey launched a new campus in Boca Raton, Florida, on February 13, 2011.

The Journey has always been a diverse group of people united by their desire "to give people the best opportunity to become fully developing followers of Jesus".

Over 1,200 people attend services each Sunday and over 1,400 people get plugged into a Journey Growth Group each semester.

=== Church Leader Insights ===
Searcy founded Church Leader Insights (CLI), an organization that provides training and resources to pastors and to church leaders. As of 2014 more than 16,000 pastors receive his bi-weekly Church Leader Insights newsletter (formerly known as Evangelism Online) each month,

CLI hosts live training-events throughout the United States and online through webinars, and offers free resources for church planters and pastors.

=== Honors ===
- 2004 Purpose Driven Church Health Award

== Bibliography ==
- Launch: Starting a New Church from Scratch (ISBN 0830743103)
- Fusion: Turning First-Time Guests into Fully-Engaged Members of Your Church] (ISBN 0830745319)
- Activate: An Entirely New Approach to Small Groups (ISBN 0830745661)
- Ignite: How to Spark Immediate Growth In Your Church (ISBN 0801072166)
- Maximize: How to Develop Extravagant Givers in Your Church (ISBN 0801072182)
- The Generosity Ladder: Your Next Step to Financial Peace] (ISBN 080107276X)
- Engage: A Guide to Creating Life-Transforming Worship Services (ISBN 0801072174)
- Revolve: A New Way to See Worship (ISBN 0801014506)
- Connect: How to Double Your Number of Volunteers (ISBN 0801014670)
- The Greatness Principle: Finding Significance and Joy by Serving Others (ISBN 0801014662)
