= Nelson Piquet (disambiguation) =

Nelson Piquet is a former Formula One driver and triple World Champion.

Nelson Piquet may also refer to:

- Nelson Piquet Jr., son of the above, also a former Formula One driver
- Autódromo Internacional Nelson Piquet, race track in Rio de Janeiro, former host of the Brazilian Grand Prix
- Autódromo Internacional Nelson Piquet (Brasília), race track in Brasília, Brazil
