= Nelson Rodríguez Arévalo =

Colombian gang leader

Nelson Rodríguez Arévalo (age and date of birth unknown) is a Colombian gang leader. He was involved in the murder of approximately 20 people in the locality of Ciudad Bolívar, Bogotá. Authorities believe he was involved in more murders, since he remained on the run for 13 years.

Known by the aliases El Viejo, El Paraco, El Cucho Jorge y Omar, Arévalo was considered a "criminal myth", one of the most wanted murderers in Bogotá. He was captured by the Colombian authorities after the so-called 'Operation Fénix' was launched, the object of which was to dismantle various criminal enterprises.

== Biography ==
He began his criminal lifestyle in 2006, after arriving in Bogotá from Palocabildo, Tolima. At that time, the AUC were fighting with many outlaw groups. Although Rodríguez never belonged to such a group, he learned how they controlled the areas and sectors in which they presided. His turf was in Ciudad Bolívar, as well as some areas surrounding the municipality of Soacha, Cundinamarca. He formed a gang called 'La Banda del Cucho', demanding from his 13 accomplices photos of victims to verify their condition, as well as looking at newspaper publications and the specialized press. Little by little, he created a large network of drug dealers and hitmen, without the authorities even knowing about him. His criminal activities brought him large sums of money, as he came to receive $80,000,000 pesos weekly.

For the investigators, Rodríguez Arévalo was a "ghost" and "criminal myth" since no one knew his what he looked like. However, police continued to research nonetheless for several years, and in 2018, they tracked him down through a conversation he had with one of his henchmen. From this, authorities were able to establish who he was, and on July 20, the so-called 'Operation Fénix', whose main objective was the dismantling of criminal gangs and groups dedicated mainly to contract killings and micro-trafficking, was launched.

During the operation, he briefly managed to evade the police, hiding out in Viotá, but on September 6, he was located and captured in La Quiba.
