= Nelson Rand =

Canadian journalist

- Occupation: Journalist
- Citizenship: Bangkok

Nelson Rand is a freelance journalist living in Bangkok, Southeast Asia. He is an editor for The Nation newspaper and was a regular contributor to Asia Times Online. He has also worked as a political contractor for the Embassy of Canada in Thailand.

== Career ==
Rand has travelled to some of the most remote and little known conflict areas of Southeast Asia.

He published his first book, Conflict: Journeys through war and terror in Southeast Asia published by Maverick House in 2009.

The book reviews his time spent with the Hmong, the Karen, the Montagnards of Vietnam and the Muslim rebels in the south of Thailand. Reviewing the obscure histories behind each of these conflicts and the atrocities behind them. The book also focuses on time spent with the Cambodian government troops tracking down the last of the Khmer Rouge in northern Cambodia.

On May 14, 2010, France 24 reported that Nelson Rand had been shot in the leg, hand and abdomen whilst covering the Red-Shirt protests in Bangkok.
