= Nelson Lee (disambiguation) =

Nelson Lee (born 1975) is a Taiwanese-Canadian actor.

Nelson Lee may also refer to:

- Nelson Lee (detective), fictional British detective
  - The Nelson Lee Library, weekly story paper that ran from 1915 to 1933
- Richard Nelson Lee (1806–1872), known as Nelson Lee, English actor, theatre manager and writer
- Nelson Lee (raconteur) (1807–1870), American writer of a fictional captivity narrative

== See also ==
- Lee Nelson (disambiguation)
- Nelson Leigh (1905–1985), American actor
