= Nelson Morpurgo =

Nelson Morpurgo (1899–1978) was an Italian lawyer and poet. He was born in Cairo in 1899, during the reign of Khedive Abbas Helimi II, the son of Italian lawyer Carlo Morpurgo.

Nelson Morpurgo attended elementary school in Athens and Padua, then joined the liceo Manzoni in Milan. Morpurgo studied law in Rome and Paris, and worked as a lawyer in Cairo from 1933 onwards. After World War II he worked for the Italian Consulate in Egypt. However, he is best known for his role in promoting Futurism, which he had discovered through his reading of the journal Lacerba and as a friend of the leading proponents of Futurism, Filippo Marinetti.

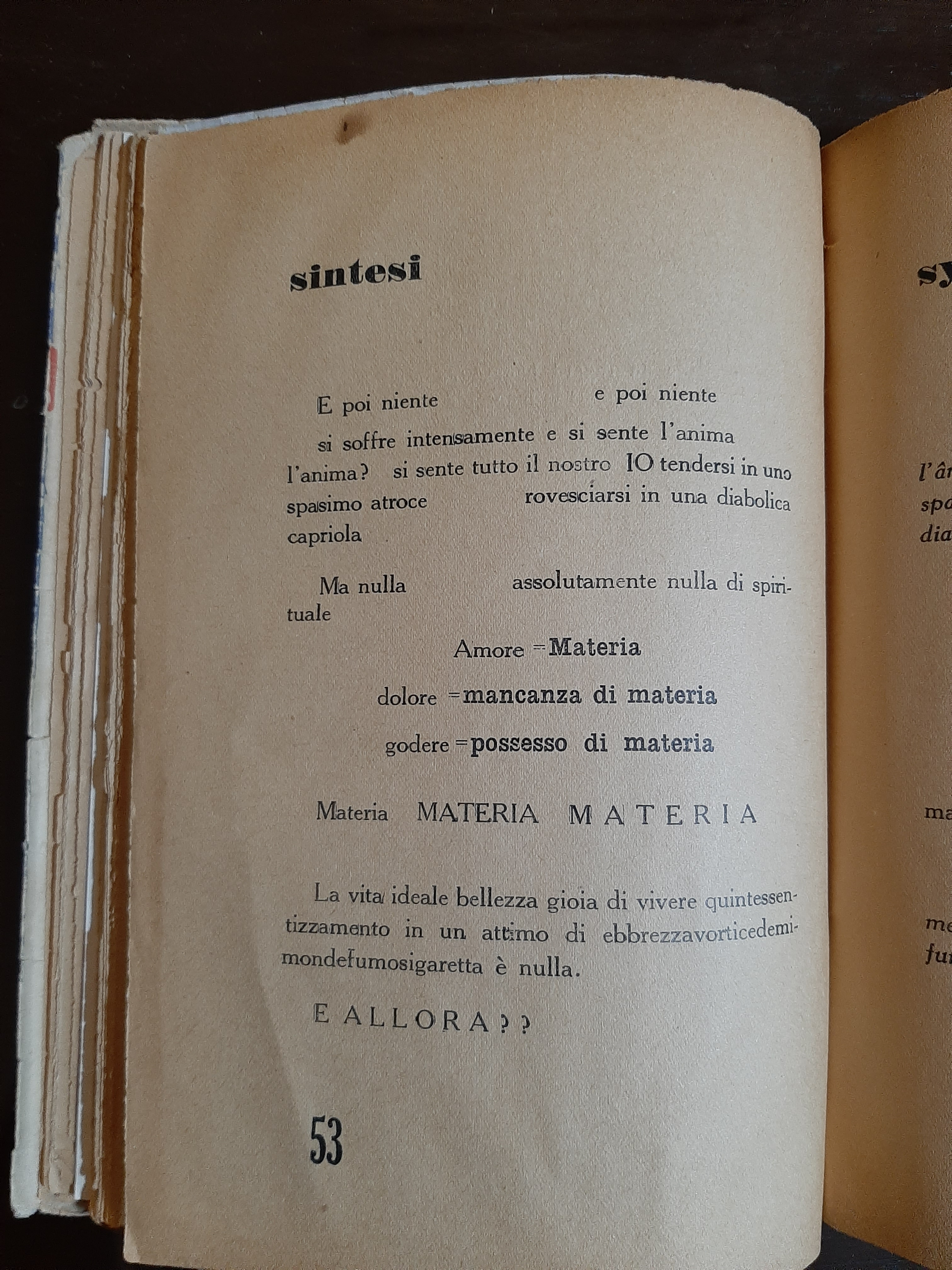
Page 53 of Per le mie donne, by Nelson Morpurgo (Cairo 1932)

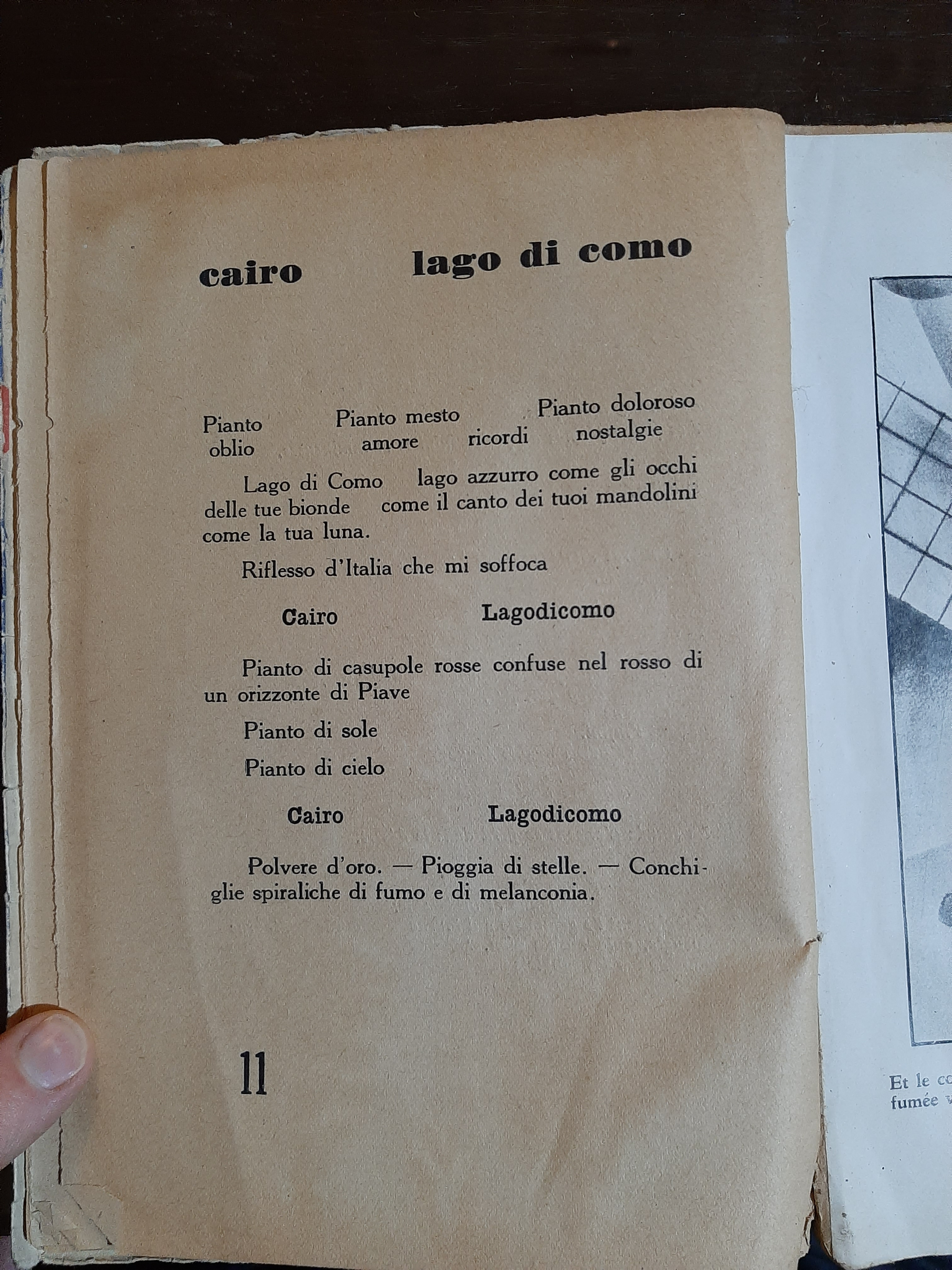
Page 11 of Per le mie donne, by Nelson Morpurgo (Cairo 1932)

After his retirement in Rimini, Morpurgo organized a conference on Futurism and participated in the celebration of the centenary of Marinetti's birth in 1976. He died in Rimini on October 11, 1978.

He is the grand-grand father of the French director and screenwriter Céline SCIAMMA.

== Editorial Work ==
Nelson Morpurgo took a leading role in the literary life of the Italian community of Cairo, and worked as editor of several journals, namely Il Bar (1921-1924), Numero (first issued 21 April 1928), Roma (until ca. 1928), Italia libera (the organ of the antifascist movement Libera Italia) (prior to 1945).

== Literary work ==
- Morfina (1921)
- Il fuoco delle Piramidi: Liriche e parole in libertà (with a preface by Marinetti)(1923)
- Per le mi donne = Pour mes femmes (with parallel French translations by Jean Moscatelli)(1932)

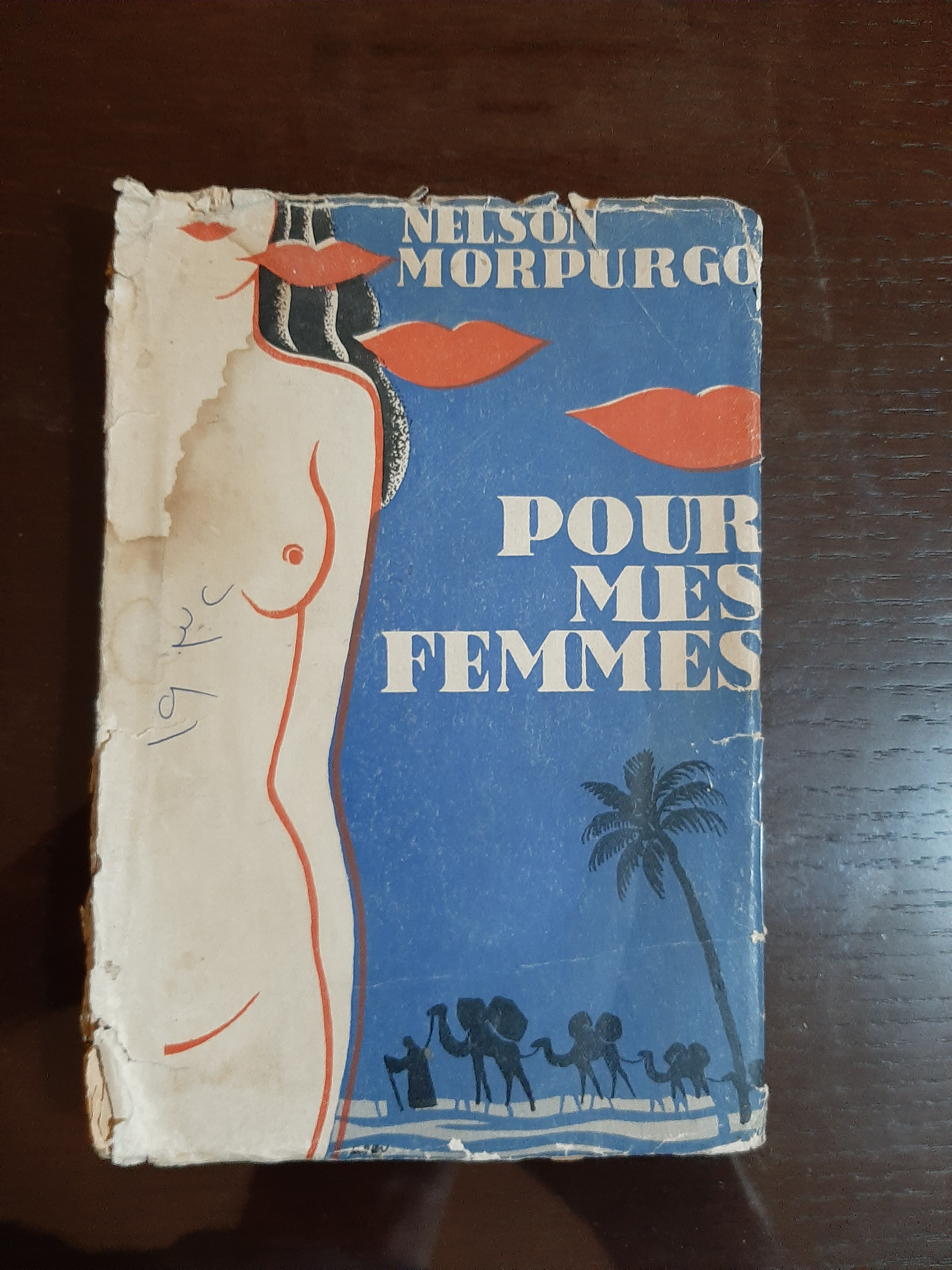
The front cover of Per le mie donne, by Nelson Morpurgo (Cairo 1932)
