= Michael Nielsen (disambiguation) =

Michael Nielsen may refer to:

- Michael Nielsen (born 1974), Australian-American quantum physicist
- Michael Nielsen (cyclist) (born 1975), Danish cyclist
- Michael Nielsen (sport shooter) (born 1975), Danish sport shooter
- Michael Mio Nielsen (born 1965), Danish footballer

== See also ==
- Mike Nielsen, Irish guitarist, composer, and educator
