= Nelson McCormick =

Nelson McCormick may refer to:

- Nelson B. McCormick (1847–1914), U.S. Representative from Kansas
- Nelson McCormick (director), American film and television director
