= Nelson Borges =

Nelson Borges may refer to:

- Nélson Borges (footballer, born 1955), Brazilian football player
- Nelson Borges (footballer, born 1992), Portuguese football player
