= Nelson Cruz (disambiguation) =

Nelson Cruz (born 1980) is a baseball outfielder from Monte Cristi, Dominican Republic.

Nelson Cruz may also refer to:

- Nelson Cruz (pitcher) (born 1972), baseball pitcher from Puerto Plata, Dominican Republic
- Nelson Cruz (athlete) (born 1977), long-distance runner from Cape Verde
