= Nelson Ferreira =

Nelson Ferreira may refer to:

- Nelson Ferreira (footballer) (born 1982), Swiss and Portuguese footballer
- Nelson Ferreira (sound editor), sound editor
- Nélson Carlos Ferreira (born 1973), Brazilian long jump athlete
- Nelson Ferreira (painter) (born 1978), Portuguese visual artist
