= Nelson Ramos =

Nelson Ramos may refer to:

- Nelson Ramos (artist) (1932–2006), Uruguayan visual artist
- Nelson Ramos (footballer) (born 1981), Colombian footballer
