= Nelson Gavit =

- Born: January 25, 1810; Lebanon, Connecticut
- Died: January 24, 1876; Philadelphia, Pennsylvania
- Occupation: American paper machinery manufacturer
- Spouse: Eliza Murray

Nelson Gavit (25 January 1810 – 24 January 1876) was an American industrial designer, manufacturer and insurance executive based in Philadelphia.

Gavit founded the Gavit Paper Machine Works, which became one of the largest American manufacturers of paper making machinery and paper mills during the nineteenth century.

== Background ==
Gavit was born in 1810 into a family of papermakers in Lebanon, Connecticut. In 1833 he married Eliza Murray and the couple had a large family. Gavit moved to Philadelphia, the center of American publishing at the time, and began manufacturing paper making equipment in 1835.

Gavit was active in local politics as a Republican. During the American Civil War, Gavit lent his name to pro-Union business organizations and advertising.

== Industrial work ==
Gavit Paper Machine Works operated at the same Philadelphia address for nearly 40 years. One of his customers was Brigham Young, who bought equipment for the first paper mill in the American West.

As an industrial designer, Gavit was awarded US patent 10,889 for an industrial paper-cutting machine in 1854, which allowed a web or roll of paper to be automatically cut into sheets of varying lengths. He was awarded a second patent in 1874 for an “improvement in machines for grinding rolls [i.e., rollers]”. The practical application of the latter design was to produce smooth faces on steel rollers capable of improving the surface polishing of paper during manufacture.

Gavit's industrial work was awarded silver medals for paper-industry machinery at the 1874 Franklin Institute exhibition. Two years later he installed a complete paper machine at the American Centennial Exhibition in 1876. The report of the awards noted that it ran “almost constant operation” through the entire exhibition. Gavit’s calenders, improved deckle frame, and paper cutter were commended specifically by the judges.

In his later years, Gavit entered the banking and insurance business. For several years, he served as vice-president of Safeguard Insurance Company of Pennsylvania. How long he remained an investor and officer of the firm is not known.

Gavit died in Philadelphia in 1876. He is buried in the West Laurel Hill Cemetery.
