= Nelson C. Baker =

American academic and civil engineer

- Education: Georgia Institute of Technology; Carnegie Mellon University
- Awards: National Science Foundation National Young Investigator, ASCE Journal of Computing Best Paper, Lilly Teaching Fellow
- Scientific career
- Fields: Civil Engineering, Educational technology

Nelson C. Baker is an American academic and civil engineer. He is the current dean of professional education at Georgia Tech and an associate professor in the institute's School of Civil and Environmental Engineering.

Among other honors, Baker has been a recipient of the National Science Foundation's Young Investigator award, the W.M. Keck Foundation Award for Engineering Teaching Excellence, the ASCE Journal of Computing Best Paper, and the ENR Educator for Construction's Next Generation award.

In 2012, Baker was appointed to the University System of Georgia's Distance Education Task Force. He also serves as a board member for the University Professional and Continuing Education Association, is a former chair of the Georgia Board of Regents Administrative Committee on Public Service and Continuing Education, and is the current president of the International Association for Continuing Engineering Education.
