= Nelson Burton =

Nelson Burton may refer to:

- Nelson Burton Sr. (1906–1994), American professional bowler
- Nelson Burton Jr. (born 1942), American professional bowler and television commentator
- Nelson Burton (ice hockey) (born 1957), Canadian professional hockey player who played for American and Canadian teams
