= Nelson Greene =

Nelson Greene may refer to:

- Nelson Greene (baseball) (1900–1983), pitcher in Major League Baseball
- Nelson Greene (Canadian football), Canadian Football League player
