= Nélson Sampaio =

Portuguese footballer

Personal information
- Full name: Nélson Roberto Magalhães Sampaio
- Date of birth: 4 April 1992 (age 34)
- Place of birth: Marco de Canaveses, Portugal
- Height: 1.86 m (6 ft 1 in)
- Positions: Centre back; defensive midfielder

Team information
- Current team: Amarante

Youth career
- 2003−2008: Vila Meã
- 2008−2009: Porto
- 2009−2011: Leixões

Senior career*
Years	Team	Apps	(Gls)
2011–2013	Leixões	12	(1)
2013–2014	Penafiel	9	(0)
2014–2015	Felgueiras 1932	16	(1)
2015–2016	Trofense	13	(1)
2016	Praiense	14	(0)
2016–2017	AD Oliveirense	24	(0)
2017–2019	Cinfães	56	(3)
2019–	Amarante	23	(1)
- * Club domestic league appearances and goals as of 1 August 2021

Nélson Roberto Magalhães Sampaio (born 4 April 1992 in Marco de Canaveses, Porto District) is a Portuguese footballer who plays for Amarante F.C. as a central defender or a defensive midfielder.
