= Nelson Diaz =

Nelson Diaz or Díaz may refer to:

- Nelson Díaz (footballer)
- Nelson Diaz (lawyer)
- Nelson Díaz (umpire)
