= Nelson Chanady =

American bicycle motocross rider (born 1963)

Personal information
- Full name: Nelson Chanady
- Born: November 19, 1963 (age 62) Miami, United States
- Height: 1.78 m (5 ft 10 in)
- Weight: 79.4 kg (175 lb)

Cycling career
- Sport: Cycling
- Current team: Retired
- Discipline: Bicycle Motocross (BMX)
- Role: Racer
- Rider type: Off Road

Amateur teams
- 1980: Team Honda
- 1980–1982: The Hot Shop
- 1982–1983: GT Racing/The Hot Shop
- 1983–1984: GT Racing

Professional team
- 1984–1985: GT Racing

Nelson Chanady (born November 19, 1963) is a former American "Old School" professional Bicycle Motocross (BMX) racer whose prime competitive years were from 1981 to 1987

== Racing career milestones ==
Note: Professional first are on the national level unless otherwise indicated.

Milestone	Event details
Started racing:	July 13, 1980, at age 17. Nelson started racing unusually old. At his age at the time racers during this era were either contemplating retiring or turning professional. As in the case of other notable BMXers, it seems friends persuaded him to try BMX. They noticed his talent on an old Redline "Square Back" BMX bicycle, talent he honed from Motorcycle Motocross as well as riding his BMX bicycle for general transportation and "thrashing".
Sanctioning body:	National Bicycle League (NBL)
Sanctioning body district(s):	American Bicycle Association (ABA) Florida 1 (FLA-1).
First race bike:	Redline "Squareback".
First race result:	First place 16 Novice class in Kendall, Florida.
First win (local):	See "First race result". He went undefeated for his entire Novice and Junior career, only defeated for the first time after turning expert.
First sponsor:	Team Honda 1980
First national win:	
Turned professional:	January 1984 at age 20.
First professional race result:	Third place in "B" Pro at the ESPN Pro Spectacular Series Final in Burbank, California, on December 23, 1983. He won US$150. The 2008 equivalent is US$308.37.
First professional win:	First place in "B" Pro at the National Bicycle League (NBL) War of the Stars VII national at Pompano, Florida, on January 15, 1984. He won US$400 or US$822.33 in 2008.
First Junior Men/pro* race result:	See above.
First Junior Men/pro win:	See above.
First Senior pro** race result:	
First Senior pro win:	The Kellogg's Frosties BMX Championship held in Birmingham, England, on April 14, 1984. He won UK£3,150 pounds sterling (GBP), which was the equivalent to US$4,347 in 1984. This in turn is the equivalent to US$8,936.66 in 2008.
Height and weight at height of his career: (1983)	Ht.:5'10 Wt.:175 lbs.
Retired:	

*In the NBL it is B"/Superclass/"A" pro (beginning with 2000 season); in the ABA it is "A" pro.
**In the NBL it is "A" pro (Elite men); in the ABA it is "AA" pro.

=== Career factory and major bike shop sponsors ===
Note: This listing only denotes the racer's primary sponsors. At any given time a racer could have numerous ever-changing co-sponsors. Primary sponsorships can be verified by BMX press coverage and sponsor's advertisements at the time in question. When possible exact dates are given.

==== Amateur ====
- Team Honda: Mid 1980 to Late 1980
- The Hot Shop (Bicycle Shop) (exclusively): Late 1980–September 1982.
- GT (Gary Turner) Racing/The Hot Shop: September 1982–June 1983. GT Racing at this time was his primary sponsor with first and longtime sponsor The Hot Shop becoming is secondary sponsor. This unusual arrangement was reflected by his uniform swapping. In ABA and NBL races in the Western States of the United States he raced in his GT livery; at ABA and NBL races in Eastern states he raced in his Hot Shop uniform with them as his primary sponsor. As a side note his GT uniform jersey had "The Hot Shop" written in large block capital letters vertically down its sleeves, as opposed to having "GT BMX" and a racing stripe down them. His Hot Shop uniform just had a GT patch. In June 1983 The Hot Shop Bicycle shop disbanded its race team. From then on Nelson Chanady was sponsored exclusively by GT Racing. Nelson Chanady's then unique dual sponsorship situation between GT and The Hot Shop was actually a foreshadowing of dual or even triple "primary sponsorships that would start in the late 1980s after BMX racing's first recession and would become common place by the late 1990s and early 2000s as companies both within and outside the BMX industry sought to spread the cost of sponsoring a race team between them.
- GT Racing (exclusively): June 1983-Early December 1984, Late February 1985- Chanady would turn pro with this sponsor.

==== Professional ====
- GT Racing (exclusively): June 1983-Early December 1984, Late February 1985- In December 1984 GT dropped Chanady from their team for lack of performance. In the BMX periodical BMX Plus! it was customary for them to along with the racer's name in the results to list his primary sponsor with him. For instance "Eric Rupe/Mongoose". The listings for "Nelson Chanady/GT" ends beginning with the NBL National #3 in Montgomery, Alabama, in the April 1985 issue. Also in that issue was the note that GT notified Chanady that they were going to let his contract expire and not renew it. Despite this, Nelson Chanady paid his own way to that race, wore a GT uniform and sat with the team. Apparently this show of loyalty impressed GT enough to reconsider their decision and rehired him (or never dropped him formally) in early 1985 since Nelson is listed in the race results with "GT" after his name beginning again with NBL National #8 in Montclair, California, in the July 1985 issue on page 52. This was confirmed in the August 1985 issue's "Check point" mini coverage of the NBL Florida Nationals #11 and #12. Another stated and perhaps more important reason was that GT wanted Chanady to represent them at the 1985 Kellogg Championship series in England.

=== Career bicycle motocross titles ===
Note: Listed are District, State/Provincial/Department, Regional, National, and International titles in italics. "Defunct" refers to the fact of that sanctioning body in question no longer existing at the start of the racer's career or at that stage of his/her career. Depending on point totals of individual racers, winners of Grand Nationals do not necessarily win National titles. Series and one off Championships are also listed in block.

==== Amateur ====
National Bicycle Association (NBA)

- None

National Bicycle League (NBL)

- 1981 Florida state No.1
- 1981 16 Expert National No.2
- 1982, 1983 17 & Over Expert National No.1

American Bicycle Association (ABA)

- 1982 17 & Over Expert Jag World Champion (ABA sanctioned)

National Pedal Sport Association (NPSA)

- 1980 16 Junior National No.1

International Bicycle Motocross Federation (IBMXF)

- 1982 17 Expert Murray World Cup of BMX I Champion.
- 1982 17 Expert & Overall World Champion.

Nelson Chanady became the first Overall World Champion for the IBMXF in 1982, its first World Championship event (the International Championship event held in October 1981 at the Pontiac Silverdome in Pontiac, Michigan, is generally isn't counted). However, there was some controversy with this title. The IBMXF followed the previous practice of holding a Trophy Dash race off between the fourteen-year-old and above classes (Expert, Open and Girls divisions but not Cruiser) including the professional winners and amateur winners racing against each other to decide the Overall Championship. This precedent was set by the Jag World Championships during the first three years of the four previous times the event was held beginning in December 1978 (which the NBL had co-sanctioned with the NBA the first three years), the Pro World Champion Greg Hill refused to race Chanady, the 17 Expert Champion and the other amateur champions for the overall title. His feelings this time where why should a pro race the amateurs? What is there to prove? At first the 14 & Over Open winner Andy Patterson tried to instigate a spontaneous boycott with the other racers, refusing to start unless Greg Hill joined them on the starting line. However, NBL Competition Director Robert Tedesco relayed to the other racers that Greg Hill's mind was set and he would not race. Tedesco urged the racers to participate without Hill. Accepting Hill's resolution, they agreed. With this Nelson became the first and last Overall World Champion. From then on the Pro World Champion is presumed to be the overall World Champion given the assumption that the Pro class is the most difficult and competitive class in BMX, as it is with any other sport. If you win the Pro Class you are assumed to be the Overall Champion.

==== Professional ====
National Bicycle Association (NBA)

- None

National Bicycle League (NBL)

- None

American Bicycle Association (ABA)

- None

United States Bicycle Motocross Association (USBA)

- None

International Bicycle Motocross Federation (IBMXF)

- 1985 Challenge Cup Pro Champion

Pro Series Championships and Invitationals

- 1984 Kellog's Frosties BMX Champion.

The Kellogg's Frosties BMX Championship held in Birmingham, England, was a series of six races held on three days total (but stretched out over a week including off days) that was centered around the invited eight top pros of the United States and eight British pros and tailored for British television broadcast. There were also eight amateurs class races held but the race focus was meant for the pros. In a bit of serendipity on Chanady's part, Stu Thomsen was slated to be one of the pros to race, but due to an ankle injury suffered at a national in Memphis, Tennessee, as per prior agreement with race organizers in the event of a slot becoming available, GT had the right to choose the replacement. GT chose Nelson Chanady over fellow GT pro Rober Fehd and he became an alternate.

=== Notable accolades ===
- Named one of the "Terrible Ten", BMX Action's pick of fastest amateur racers in the world in 1983
- Named one of "1984's Hottest Rookie Pros" by BMX Action Magazine.

== BMX press magazine interviews and articles ==
- "Total Racer: Nelson Chanady Total BMX' September 1981 Vol.2 No.4 pg.24
- "Nelson Who?" BMX Plus! October 1981 Vol.4 No.10 pg.32 side bar article on his meteoric rise.
- "Nelson Chanady" Total BMX November 1982 Vol.3 No.5 pg.46
- "Sharpshootin': Nelson Chanady" BMX Action December 1982 Vo.7 No.12 pg.90 short biography.
- "1984's Hottest Rookie Pros" BMX Action October 1984 Vol.9 No.10 pg.74

== BMX magazine covers ==
Note: Only magazines that were in publication at the time of the racer's career(s) are listed unless specifically noted.

Minicycle/BMX Action & Super BMX:

- None

Bicycle Motocross Action & Go:

- None

BMX Plus!:

- December 1983 Vol.6 No.11* In inset with Stu Thomsen, Greg Hill, Tim Judge, Gary Debacker and others at beginning of national banner presentation at the start of a race. Brian Patterson is the main image.

*Due to a change in ownership, BMX Plus! did not publish a May 1983 issue.

Total BMX:

- November 1982 Vol.3 No.5

Bicycles and Dirt:

- None

NBA World & NBmxA World (The official NBA/NBmxA membership publication):

- None

Bicycles Today & BMX Today (The official NBL membership publication under two names):

ABA Action, American BMXer, BMXer (The official ABA membership publication under three names):

USBA Racer (The official USBA membership publication):
