= Alto Taquari =

- Municipality
- The Municipality of Alto Taquari
- Location of Alto Taquari
- Coordinates: 17°49′33″S 53°16′55″W
- Country: Brazil
- Region: Central-West
- State: Mato Grosso
- Founded: May 13, 1986

Government
  - Mayor: Lairto João Sperandio (PMBD)

Area
  - Total: 1,394.760 km^{2} (538.520 sq mi)
- Elevation: 851 m (2,792 ft)

Population (2020)
  - Total: 11,133
  - Density: 4/km^{2} (10/sq mi)
- Time zone: UTC−3 (BRT)
- HDI (2000): 0.804 – high

Alto Taquari is the southernmost municipality in the Brazilian state of Mato Grosso.
