= Nelson Orozco =

Bolivian footballer (born 2000)

Personal information
- Full name: Jorge Nelson Orozco Quiroga
- Date of birth: 24 January 2000 (age 26)
- Position: Striker

Team information
- Current team: Club Deportivo Guabirá

Senior career*
Years	Team	Apps	(Gls)
2018–2022	Club Blooming	45	(6)
2023	Real Santa Cruz	9	(0)
2023-2024	Real Tomayapo	20	(3)
2024-	Guabirá	10	(0)

International career^{‡}
2020	Bolivia		
- * Club domestic league appearances and goals as of 30 December 2025 (UTC) ‡ National team caps and goals as of 16:08, 26 March 2024 (UTC)

Jorge Nelson Orozco Quiroga (born 24 January 2000) is a Bolivian footballer who plays in Bolivian Primera División for Club Deportivo Guabirá.

== Career ==
He joined Real Tomayapo from Real Santa Cruz in June 2023. With the club he played in the Copa Sudamericana in 2024.

== Style of play ==
He is described as able to play upfront as a striker, as well as slightly deeper linking the midfield with the attack.

== International career ==
He made his debut aged 20 for Bolivia on 13 October 2020 against Argentina.
