= Nelson Gill =

Reconstruction-era educator

Nelson Green Gill was a state legislator and school organizer in Mississippi. He organized a school for African American students in Holly Springs, Mississippi. Mrs. Gill was also involved with the school. He represented Marshall County, Mississippi in the Mississippi House of Representatives in 1874 and 1875. He was white. He was a Republican.

== Career ==
=== American Civil War service ===
From Illinois, Gill served in the Union Army during the American Civil War. He lived in Mississippi after the war and was appointed sheriff and to the board of supervisors. He represented Marshall County, Mississippi in the Mississippi House of Representatives in 1874 and 1875 and as sergeant at arms.

=== Post-war ===
He served as a Freedmen's Bureau agent in Holly Springs, Mississippi after the American Civil War. A Democratic Party spokesman passed a death threat to him from the Ku Klux Klan. but assassination attempt against him by the Klan failed. He worked to organize African Americans in Oxford, Mississippi into a Loyal League.

Gill was critical of abuses of apprenticeship laws including the binding of a teenager to her former slaveowner instead of letting her live with her mother.

Gill was targeted for his political activities and because he fraternized with African Americans.

He served as president of the board of supervisors from 1869 to 1871.
