= Engineers Against Poverty =

British non-governmental organization

Engineers Against Poverty (EAP) is a specialist British NGO working in the field of engineering and international development. It was established in 1998 by the Royal Academy of Engineering and the Department for International Development (DFID).
