= Nelson Batista =

Cuban salsa dancer

Nelson Batista is a Cuban salsa dancer.

== Early life ==
Nelson was born in 1962, in the Buena Vista neighbourhood of Havana. Cuban music was a part of Nelson's childhood, and through his life in Cuba, Latin dance became a family tradition, passed from father to son.

He trained in dance alongside his regular studies at specialised dance courses in the Casa de Cultura community centre.

He studied economics, and studied languages to a high level. After moving to England in the 1980s, he did some work for Dunn & Co., before taking up a serious career in Salsa dance.

== Career ==
In 1988 Nelson became actively involved in promoting and organising Latin dance and music activities in London. Nelson became the first Salsa dance instructor in London, to high acclaim.

As a result, he extended his classes to venues all over the country, thus establishing himself as the top Salsa dance teacher in the UK. Many of Nelson's students have since progressed to dance professionally and to teach Salsa themselves.

Nelson continues to contribute to the current thriving Salsa scene by teaching it in many venues around London and the Home Counties and by regularly holding intensive workshops all over the country. Nelson is considered to be the leading authority within this sphere, and he is also frequently called upon to act in an advisory role whenever authenticity or expert opinion is required. Most recently, after the official acknowledgement of the Salsa dance as an established dance form by the UKA (United Kingdom Alliance of teachers of dance), Nelson was awarded an Honorary Fellowship of the UKA in Salsa, along with Paul Harris and others.

== Media credits ==
In addition to his personal involvement in the Latin dance and music world, Nelson has performed in national theatre, having participated in the Danceworld 94 exposition. In 1992 he was called upon to choreograph and advise on the music for the production of Salsa Celestina at the Watford Theatre for which he received rave reviews. Throughout Nelson's career he has appeared in numerous TV programmes demonstrating and promoting Salsa Dance in London and the UK. He also participated in the Nelson Batista 'Just Dance 1998' show. Nelson's TV credits include: Juke Box 1990 (Sky TV); Capital Woman; 6 O’clock Live; Liz Earle's Lifestyle; Rear Window (Salsa Fever); The Great Escape TV-am; Esther Rantzen

Nelson has also been acclaimed in the national press, i.e. The Guardian, The Times, etc.; and also contributed to various Salsa and Latin dance orientated publications i.e. Latin London.

== Awards ==
- In 1998: Nelson Batista was awarded the title of Fellow of the UKA, for having established and developed Salsa dancing throughout the country since 1989.
- In 2003: Nelson received a Salsa Lifetime Achievement Award from the largest Salsa organisation in the country: Salsa UK, in recognition of his outstanding contribution to the establishment and growth of Salsa dancing throughout the UK.
- In 2005: Nelson received an award from Mambo City organisation in appreciation to his contribution to Salsa in the UK.
