= International Federation of Consulting Engineers =

International engineering standards organisation

International Federation of Consulting Engineers (FIDIC)
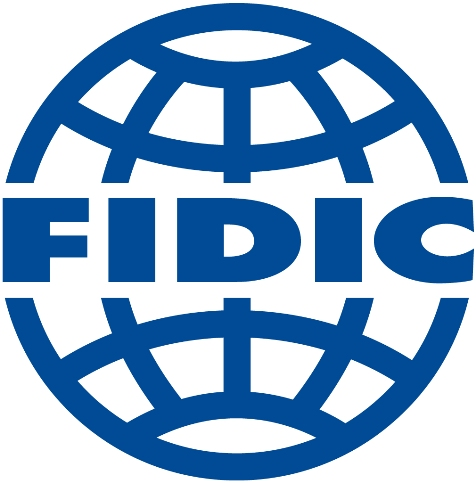
- Type: International NGO
- Founded: 1913
- Headquarters: Geneva, Switzerland
- Key people: Alfredo Ingletti (President)
- Website: fidic.org

The International Federation of Consulting Engineers (commonly known as FIDIC, acronym for its French name Fédération Internationale Des Ingénieurs-Conseils) is an international standards organization for construction technology and consulting engineering. The organization is best known for the FIDIC suite of contract templates.

== History ==
There were 59 participants at the inaugural meeting during a World Exhibition in Ghent, Belgium, in July 1913, called to discuss the possibility of forming a global federation of consulting engineers. Of these, 19 were official delegates from the US, Belgium, Denmark, France, Germany, Netherlands and Switzerland, with the remainder coming from Austria–Hungary, Canada, Russia and the UK. This meeting led to FIDIC's formal constitution being adopted on 22 July 1913. Some countries maintained only provisional links during the first few years. The founding members of FIDIC were Belgium, France, and Switzerland. FIDIC led a difficult life until the late 1940s with changing numbers of members, all from European countries. The United States, Australia, Canada, and South Africa joined these in 1959. The first member associations from the developing world, from Central Africa (now Malawi), Zambia and Zimbabwe, joined in 1962. Colombia joined in 1967. FIDIC has members in 104 countries.

In May 2025, Susanna Zammataro was appointed as the new CEO of FIDIC. The current president is Alfredo Ingletti.

== Services ==
FIDIC has a mission of representing consulting engineering globally, including through promoting the interests of companies, organizations and engineers who provide technology-based services. The organization arranges a number of seminars and training courses, including the World Consulting Engineer Conference.

=== Standard form contracts ===
FIDIC publishes international contracts and business practice documents which are used globally. The organization published an updated "rainbow suite" of contracts in 1999, which established a number of different conditions of contract depending on the circumstances of the works:

- the Red Book, which dates back to 1957, covers engineering and building projects that the employer designs.
- the Orange Book was published in 1995 to establish an option for design–build and turnkey contracts
- the Yellow Book covers circumstances of design–build, where mechanical and electrical (M&E), building and engineering works are designed by the Contractor.
- the Silver Book covers projects which will follow the engineering, procurement and construction (EPC) and turnkey approach.
- the Green Book created a short form of contract.

The Yellow Book and the Silver Book effectively superseded the Green Book, as it is common for them to be used in the relevant circumstances. In 2005 FIDIC published an amended version of the Red Book for use by Multilateral Development Banks.

In 2017, FIDIC published the second edition of all of its Books.
