= Nelson Michael =

American infectious disease researcher

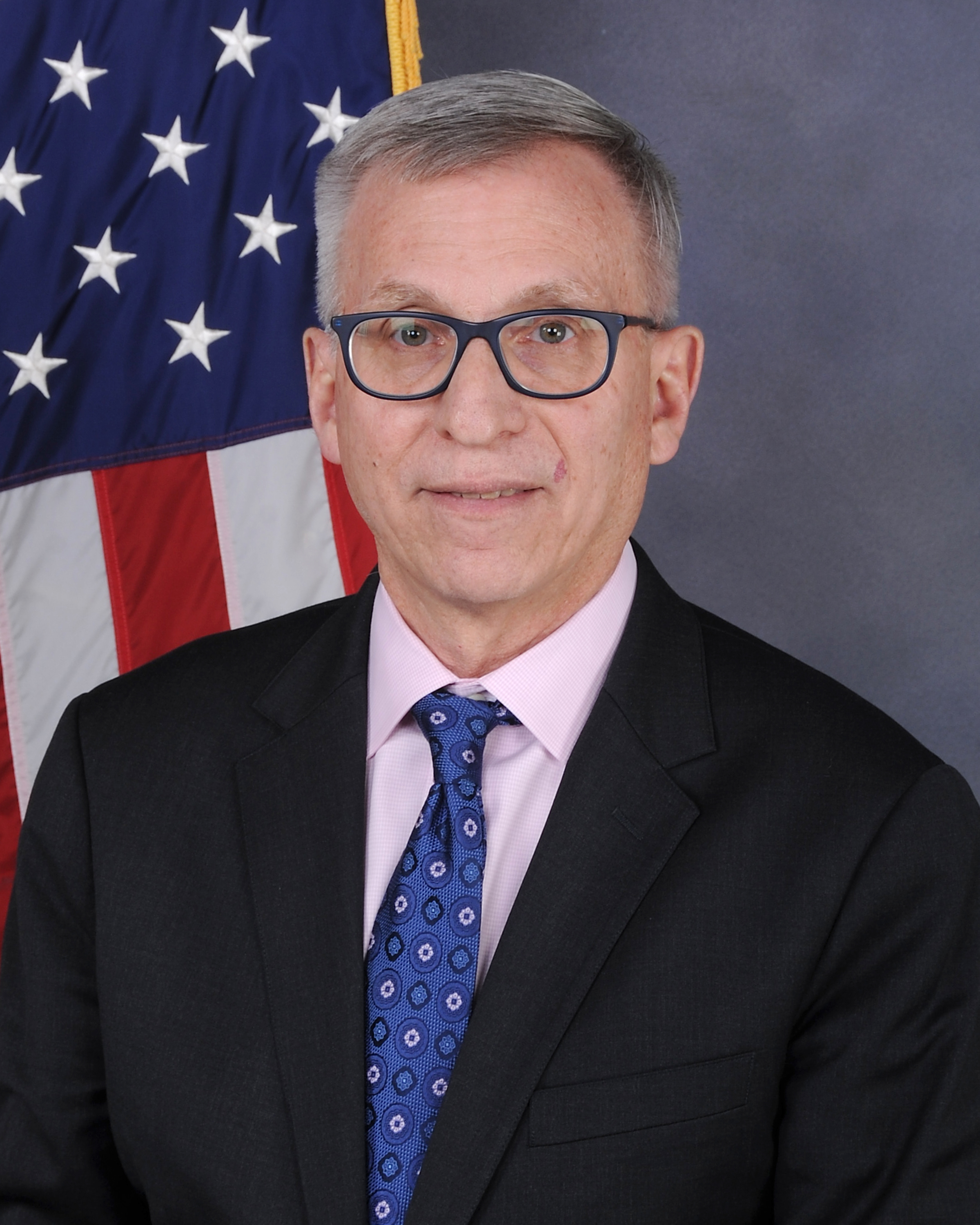

Personal details
- Education: University of California, Los Angeles; Stanford University

Military service
- Allegiance: United States
- Branch/service: United States Army
- Years of service: 1989–2018
- Rank: Colonel

Nelson L. Michael is an American infectious disease researcher. He has served for nearly 30 years in the United States Army and been directly involved with significant advancements in understanding the pathology of and vaccine development for diseases like HIV, Zika, Ebola and more. Much of his career has been spent at the Walter Reed Army Institute of Research.

== Career ==
=== Early career ===
Michael graduated summa cum laude from the University of California, Los Angeles in 1979 with a degree in biology and was commissioned a second lieutenant in the U.S. Army through the ROTC program. His father, a commissioned officer in the U.S. Public Health Service, performed the ceremony. Subsequently, he attained a medical degree and Ph.D. degree in cancer biology from Stanford University in 1986. He continued his training in internal medicine at Harvard Medical School, Massachusetts General Hospital from 1986 to 1989, after which he entered active service in the U.S. Army.

=== HIV research ===
Upon entering active Army service, Michael joined the Walter Reed Army Institute of Research's department of vaccine research, division of retrovirology. He eventually served as the director of the U.S. Military HIV Research Program for 12 years between 2006 and 2018.

Under his leadership, MHRP completed the groundbreaking RV144 vaccine trial in 2009. The trial, testing a prime-boost vaccine regimen, was an international collaboration involving partners from the Thai and U.S governments, private companies and non-profit organizations as well as 16,000 Thai volunteers. Critically, it was the first study to demonstrate modest efficacy from an HIV vaccine regimen, demonstrating that an efficacious vaccine was possible. The wealth of data generated by the trial still informs current vaccine development.

Michael also continued MHRP's longstanding research into effective diagnostics and a functional cure. For his excellence as an HIV researcher and leader in global health, he received the Hero of Military Medicine Award for the U.S. Army.

=== Emerging infectious diseases ===
Michael has also participated in U.S. Army programs to respond to emerging infectious disease outbreaks around the world. Amidst the West African Ebola virus epidemic, Michael and other WRAIR researchers published a study in 2015 showing that vaccines for Ebola and Marburg viruses are safe and well tolerated separately and together – the first clinical trial to assess an Ebola virus vaccine and Marburg virus vaccine in an African population.

Amidst the Zika virus epidemic, as the Zika virus began to threaten U.S. service members stationed in the southern United States, WRAIR was tasked by the U.S. Army to develop a vaccine countermeasure against the disease. With Michael serving as the project's co-lead, scientists developed a vaccine candidate, completed preclinical trials and initiated human clinical trials in 10 months. WRAIR assets that were dedicated to addressing this and previous outbreaks were solidified in 2018 into a formal research branch specifically tasked to identify emerging disease threats.

For his work on Zika, Ebola and other infectious diseases, Michael has received significant media attention: he was included in a New Yorker article about the vaccine development and named one of Vice Motherboard's 2017 ‘Humans of the Year’.

Michael has recently expanded his research interest to bacteriophage therapies, overseeing a Department of Defense-wide task force into the emerging treatment strategy.

=== Other ===
During his career, Michael has served on the Presidential Commission for the Study of Bioethical Issues, Vaccine Research Center Scientific Advisory Working Group (NIAID, NIH), Office of AIDS Research Advisory Committee (NIH), AIDS Research Advisory Committee (NIAID, NIH), AIDS Vaccine Research Working Group (DAIDS, NIAID, and NIH), Center for HIV/AIDS Vaccine Immunology Scientific Advisory Board, Office of the Global AIDS Coordinator Scientific Steering Committee, the Scientific Committee of the Global HIV AIDS Vaccine Enterprise and the PEPFAR Scientific Advisory Board.
