= Michael James Nelson =

American comedy writer and performer (born 1979)

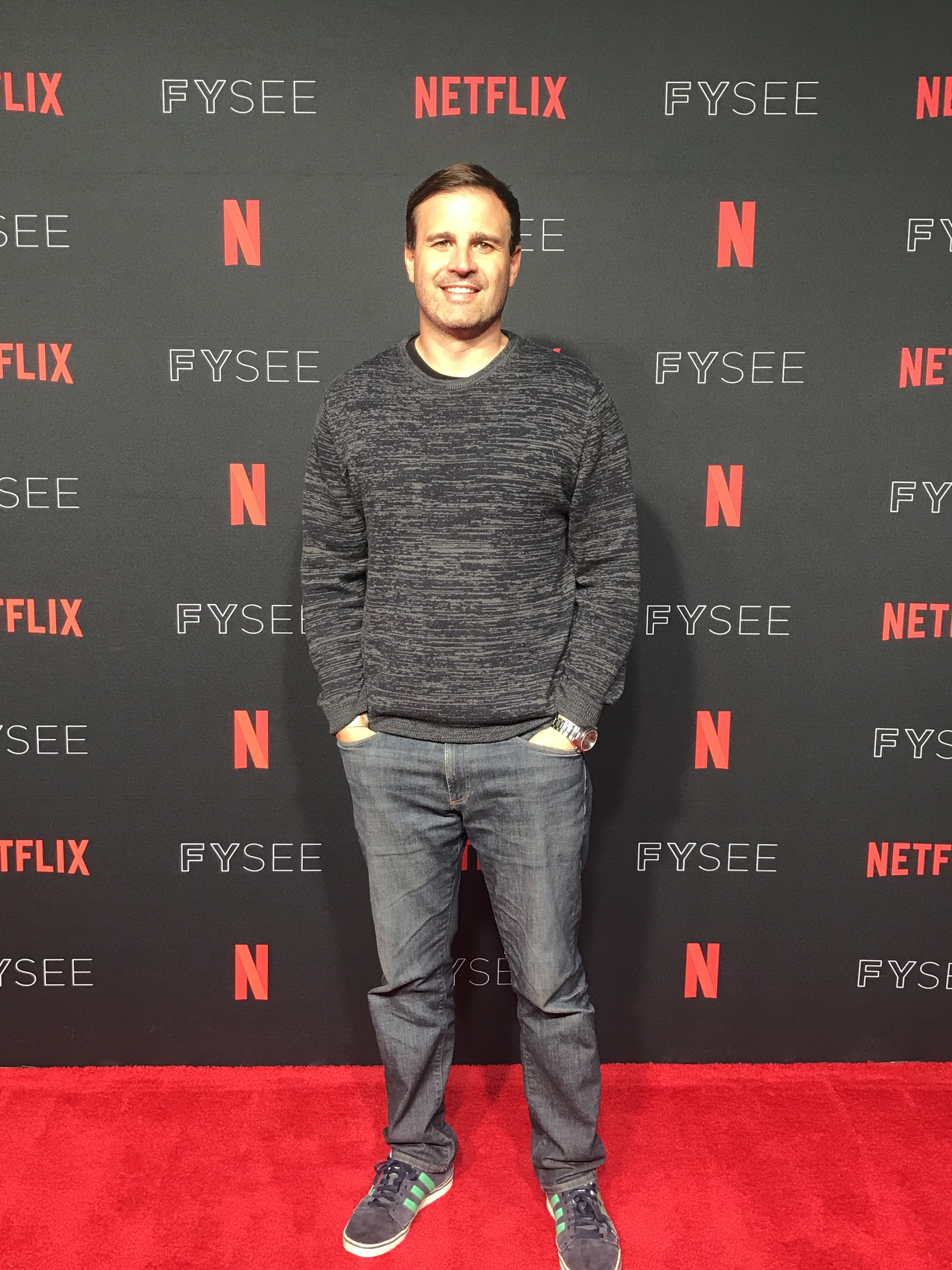
- Michael James Nelson at a Netflix red carpet event in Los Angeles, CA (June 1st, 2018) Michael James Nelson at a Netflix red carpet event in Los Angeles, CA (June 1st, 2018)
- Born: June 12, 1979 (age 46); Winter Park, Florida
- Occupations: Comedian; Writer; Producer
- Years active: 2003–present

Michael James Nelson (born June 12, 1979, in Winter Park, Florida, USA) is an American comedy writer and performer who has appeared on various national TV commercials and television shows on Music Television, CBS, and the television show Pretty Wicked on The Oxygen Network. He also was a writer on Betty White's Off Their Rockers on NBC, multiple seasons of the MTV Movie & TV Awards, and various other television shows. In 2017, Michael appeared on the People's Choice Awards as Dwayne "The Insurance Adjuster" Johnson in a comedy sketch where both he and Dwayne Johnson lost the "Favorite Dwayne Johnson" Award to an actual rock.

== Biography ==
Nelson is from Winter Park, Florida but spent most of his childhood in neighboring Maitland, Florida. He attended both Edgewater High School and Winter Park High School, and graduated from The Creative Writing Program at Florida State University in 2003. While attending college, Nelson was a newscaster and talk show host on the university's radio station WVFS. He was also a senior staff writer at the FSView creator and host of the variety sketch comedy show "That Show With Those Guys".

Nelson has performed stand-up comedy at The Comedy Store in Los Angeles as well as the Comedy Cellar in New York City and many other comedy clubs. Nelson has frequently been featured on the website of Funny or Die and has appeared in their exclusive sketches with Matthew Morrison, Don Cheadle, Ray Romano, Cedric the Entertainer, George Lopez, Joe Mantegna, Chace Crawford, Rebecca Mader, Haley Joel Osment, Cheech Marin, Oliver Hudson, Larenz Tate and many more. Nelson has studied improvisational comedy at The Groundlings and Upright Citizens Brigade Theatre in Hollywood. Nelson is currently performing stand-up comedy and writing for various television shows.
