= José Alberto García Vilano =

Mexican cartel leader

José Alberto García Vilano, also known as La Kena and Ciclon 19, is a Mexican drug lord and leader of the Los Ciclones cell within the Gulf Cartel, an international crime syndicate.

García Vilano's cell was accused of kidnapping four U.S. citizens in Matamoros, Tamaulipas, in March 2023, with two of the victims being killed.

== 2024 arrest ==
On January 19, 2024, García Vilano was seen in a shopping plaza in Monterrey, Nuevo León, being escorted by armed police.

== Extradition to the United States ==
On February 27, 2025, García Vilano was among 29 narcos who were extradited to the United States.
