= 2023 Matamoros kidnappings =

Abduction of four Americans in Mexico

- Part of the Mexican drug war
- Location: Matamoros, Tamaulipas, Mexico
- Date: 3–7 March 2023
- Deaths: 3
- Injuries: 2
- Charges: 5

On 3 March 2023, four Americans were kidnapped in Matamoros, Tamaulipas, Mexico. A U.S. official said they were likely mistaken for Haitian drug smugglers by members of a drug cartel.

== Incident ==
The four U.S. citizens—Shaeed Woodard, Zindell Brown, Eric Williams, and Latavia "Tay" McGee—were all African American residents of the state of South Carolina. On the morning of 3 March 2023, they crossed the border for McGee to undergo a cosmetic surgical procedure. Shortly after, their minivan was intercepted by a group of gunmen in central Matamoros and the four were bundled onto the bed of a pickup truck. A Mexican bystander, Arely Pablo Servando, was killed when she was struck by a stray bullet during the abduction. According to Tamaulipas Governor Américo Villarreal, the cartel moved the kidnapped victims around in an effort to create confusion and avoid efforts to rescue them, and took them to a medical clinic at some point.

On 7 March 2023, the missing Americans were located by security forces in El Tecolote, an ejido 10 km (6.2 mi) southeast of where they had been abducted in Matamoros. Woodard and Brown were dead. Williams had three gunshot wounds to his leg and McGee had no physical injuries; the two were taken to the border shortly after their discovery and hospitalized in Texas. A 24-year-old male from Valle Hermoso, Tamaulipas, allegedly found guarding them, was taken into custody and charged with aggravated kidnapping.

In the early morning of 9 March, five men with their hands tied were found abandoned at the site of the original abduction in downtown Matamoros. An accompanying message, purportedly from the Grupo Escorpión faction of the Gulf Cartel, identified them as the perpetrators and extended an apology to the families of the victims on both sides of the border and to the people of Matamoros in general. The five were later charged by the state prosecution service with aggravated kidnapping and homicide.

== Aftermath ==
U.S. Senator Lindsey Graham of South Carolina responded to the incident by calling on the United States to add drug cartels to the Foreign Terrorist Organizations list, while also pressuring the Mexican government to destroy the cartels or have the United States military intervene.

In response, President Andrés Manuel López Obrador described any form of foreign interference as "an offense to the people of Mexico" and threatened to launch an information campaign asking Mexicans and Latinos in the United States not to vote for Republican officials until they stopped threatening to intervene in the country. Some opposition politicians and human rights activists expressed indignation at the speed with which the missing Americans were located, in contrast to the many thousands of other victims of forced disappearances in the country whose cases remain unsolved.

Prior to the incident, the state of Tamaulipas and five others were already on the U.S. State Department's "Do Not Travel" advisory list. On 11 March, in response to the Matamoros kidnappings and the disappearance of three women from Texas in the same area in late February, the Texas Department of Public Safety urged people in the state to refrain from traveling anywhere in Mexico during the upcoming spring break holiday because of ongoing drug cartel violence and other criminal activity.

== See also ==
- José Alberto García Vilano, a leader of the Gulf Cartel taken into custody in January 2024
- Medical tourism in Mexico
- Murder of Mark Kilroy
- 2011 Matamoros mass kidnapping
