= Nelson Terán =

Mexican singer and composer (born 1968)

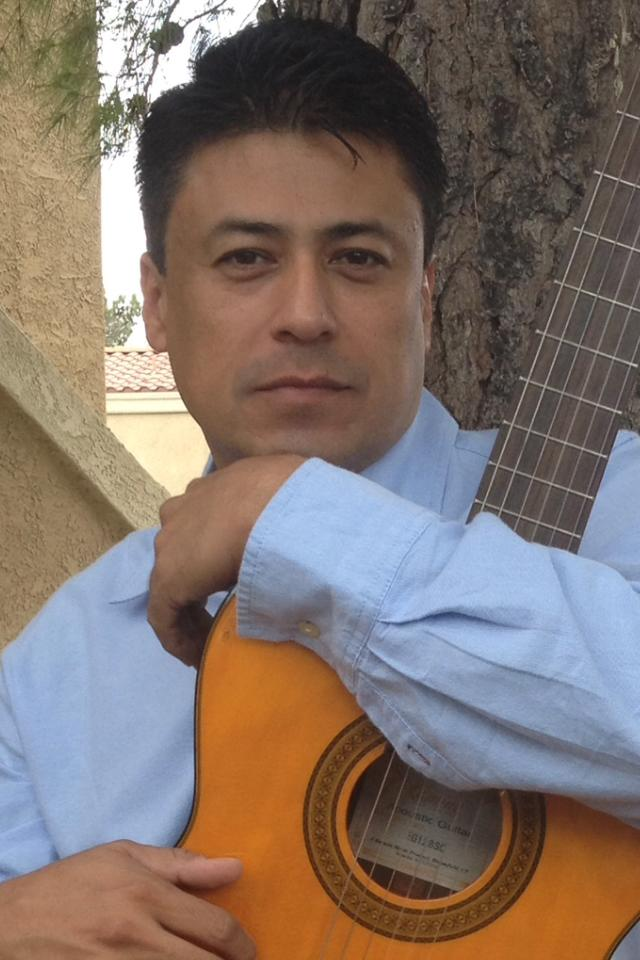

Background information
- Born: Nelson Teran; November 5, 1968 (age 57); Matamoros, Tamaulipas, Mexico
- Genres: Trova music
- Instrument: Guitar

Nelson Terán (born 5 November 1968) is a Mexican singer and composer who has excelled in genres such as folk songs and Latin American folklore, modern and contemporary trova and regional Mexican music.

== Early life and education ==
Nelson Teran was born in Matamoros, Tamaulipas, Mexico. He is the youngest of five sons of Manuel Teran and Antonia Martinez. He attended Elementary, Middle and High School in Control, Tamaulipas, a town of just over 3,000 inhabitants, which belongs to the Municipality of Matamoros, Northern Mexico, on the border of the United States. He learned his passion for singing from his parents; his mother liked to sing and his father was part of a trio in his youth. Nelson learned to play the guitar at age eleven on his own. At fifteen he joined a band called Grupo Romántico Señorial, singing for the first time before an audience. In 1986 Nelson Teran moved to the city of Saltillo, Coahuila for higher education at the Universidad Autonoma Agraria Antonio Narro where he majored in Agronomy.

== Musical career ==
After college, he devoted himself to music. In 1998 he recorded his first album "Temperamento Bohemio" in Matamoros. This album contains songs representative of the Latin American popular music history. The album was supported by the International Fall Festival of Tamaulipas State Government. Teran then was recognized as The Voice of the Fall and the following year he was named Favorite Son of the City of Matamoros. After "Temperamento Bohemio", Nelson Teran recorded nine more albums, some of them included Mexican regional rhythms. In 2010, Teran composed the song "Avenida Abismo" which was included in the soundtrack of the movie "Embroidering the Border", a short film that highlights the controversial issue of illegal immigration to the United States. This song is included in the album "Mi trova mi cariño" (2011). Nelson has played trova music in Southern United States, and he has also performed in countries such as: Costa Rica, Canada, Colombia and El Salvador

== Discography ==
- 1998 Temperamento Bohemio (Independent Production)
- 2002 Nelson Teran (Sony Music)
- 2003 Salió cabrona la niña (Musimex)
- 2004 Amores perdidos (Universal Music)
- 2005 Olvidarte nunca (Musimex)
- 2008 Soy Trova (Soy Trova Music)
- 2011 Mi trova mi cariño (Independent Production)
- 2017 Por amar a morir (Blue Apple Records)
