= Museum of Mexican Agrarianism =

Museum in Matamoros, Tamaulipas

Coordinates: 25°50′51″N 97°27′16″W

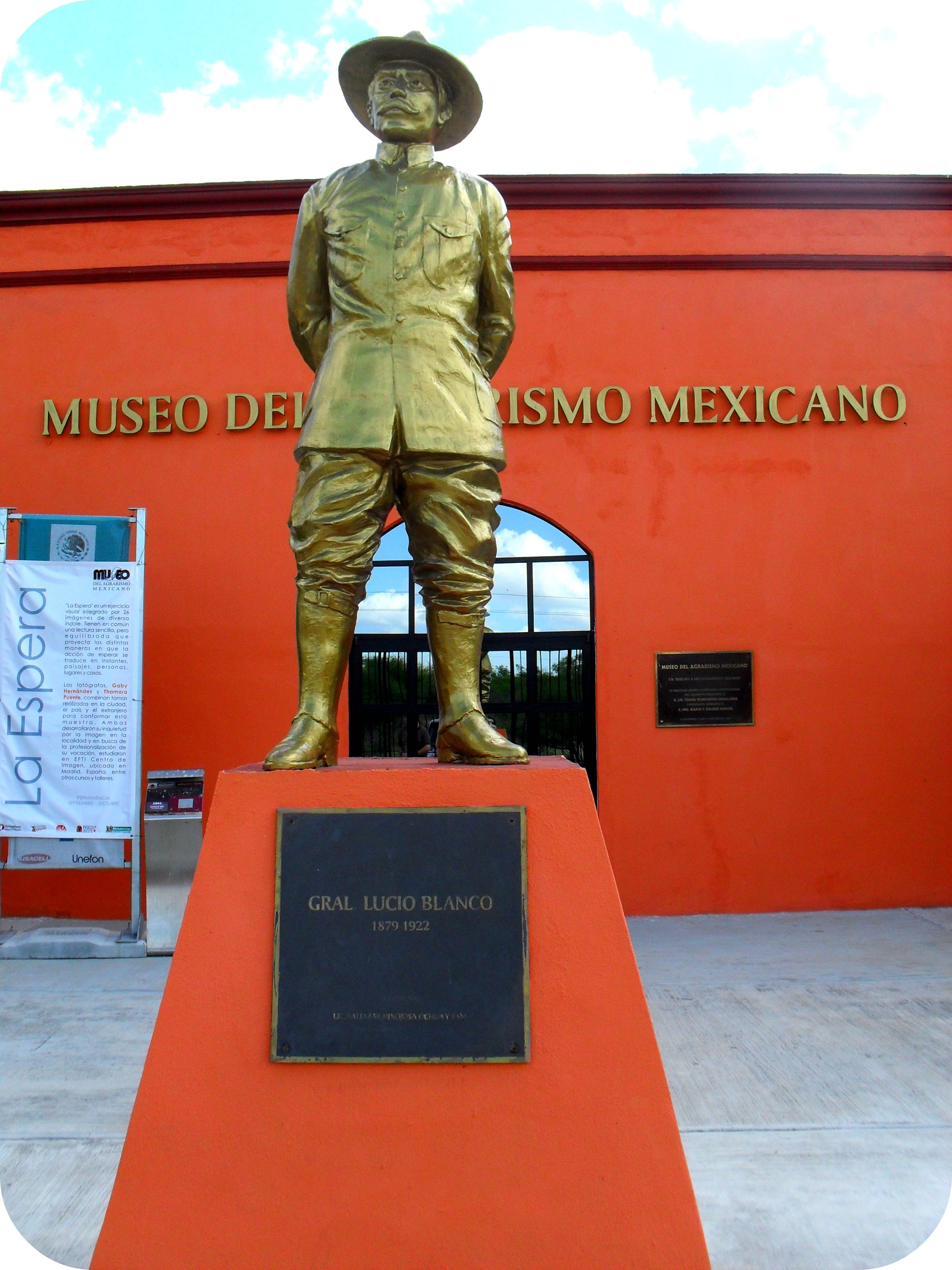
Statue of Lucio Blanco in front of the museum, 15 October 2011

The Museum of Mexican Agrarianism (Spanish: Museo del Agrarismo Mexicano) is an free admission establishment of the Instituto Matamorense para la Cultura y las Artes dedicated to the history of agrarianism and land reform in Mexico. It is located on the Ejido Lucio Blanco, Heroica Matamoros, Tamaulipas, and was founded on 10 April 2002.

== History ==
Matamoros's history with agrarianism initiated with Mexican revolutionary Lucio Blanco's expropriation of Porfirio Díaz's hacienda Los Borregos on 30 August 1913.

During its construction in 2001, historian Georgina Escalona Vazquez sought copies of photographs of the Revolution, including ones of Blanco, from the University of Texas at Austin. On 10 April 2002, it was founded.

From at least 2013 to 2016, its director was Monica Cecilia Robles.

On 24 November 2019, a celebration of the 165th anniversary of matamorense Catarino Garza's, leader of the Garza Revolution, birthday was held. Attendees included mayor Mario Alberto López Hernández, municipal Secretary of Education, Culture, and Sports Alejandro Villafañez Zamudio, historian Andrés Florentino Cuéllar Cuéllar, and University of Atlántico students. At the end of the event, a plaque dedicated to Garza was revealed.

On 10 April 2024, a commemoration of Emiliano Zapata on the 105th anniversary of his death was held at the museum with ayuntamiento members, municipal officials, and servicemen present.

== Collections ==
There are permanent exhibits on revolutionary leaders and the Capture of Matamoros (1913) and services include printed brochures, tour guides, conferences, and workshops. The collections hold material including Porfirian and revolutionary period utensils, weaponry, documents, and photographs. The latter two include ones of the Pancho Villa Expedition. By 19 January 2016, it was organized into four modules:

1. The Porfiriato;
2. The Mexican Revolution, redistribution in Tamaulipas, and Francisco José Múgica and Lucio Blanco;
3. The agrarian problem, post-revolutionary reconstruction, Portesgilismo, Liga de Comunidades Agrarias en Tamaulipas, Venustiano Carranza's Ley del 6 de Enero de 1915, and the Liga de los campesinos tamaulipecos;
4. Cardenismo, education's role in agrarian reform, and Eduardo Chávez.

== See also ==
- Instituto de Investigaciones Históricas (UAT)
- List of museums in Mexico
- Museo Comunitario del Asalto a las Tierras
- Museo de Historia Natural de Tamaulipas
- Museo Regional de Historia de Tamaulipas
