= Matamoros, Tamaulipas =

Matamoros
- City
- Heroica Matamoros
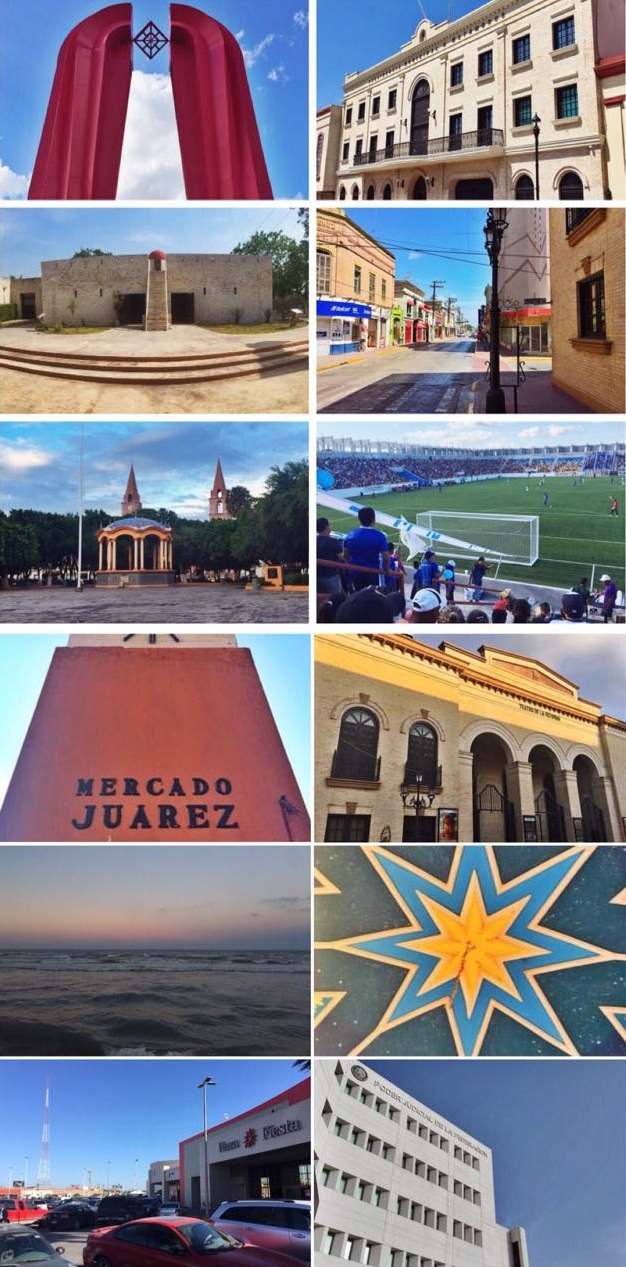
- Above, from left to right: Great Gate of Mexico, Municipal Palace, Fort Casa Mata Historical Museum, Sixth Avenue, Main Square, El Hogar Stadium, Juárez Market, Reforma Theater, Bagdad Beach, Kiosk in Plaza Principal, Plaza Fiesta, and the building of the Judicial Power of the Federation.

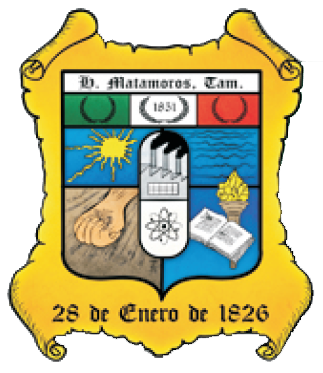
- Coat of arms
- Nicknames: Siempre Heroica, Invicta y Leal
- Location within Tamaulipas Location within Mexico
- Coordinates: 25°52′47″N 97°30′15″W
- Country: Mexico
- State: Tamaulipas
- Municipality: Matamoros Municipality
- Established: 1774
- Named for: Mariano Matamoros

Government
  - Type: Municipality
  - Presidente Municipal: Mario Alberto López Hernández (MORENA)

Area
  - Urban: 115.3 km^{2} (44.5 sq mi)
- Elevation: 9 m (30 ft)

Population (2020)
  - City: 510,739
  - Metro: 1,387,985
  - Metro density: 4,431/km^{2} (11,480/sq mi)
- Time zone: UTC−06:00 (Zona Centro)
  - Summer (DST): UTC−05:00 (DST)
- ZIP Code: 87300
- Area code: +52-868
- Airport: General Servando Canales International Airport
- Website: matamoros.gob.mx

Matamoros, officially known as Heroica Matamoros, is a city in the northeastern Mexican state of Tamaulipas, and the municipal seat of the homonymous municipality. It is on the southern bank of the Rio Grande, directly across the border from Brownsville, Texas, United States. Matamoros is the second largest city in the state of Tamaulipas. As of 2016, Matamoros had a population of 520,367. In addition, the Matamoros–Brownsville Metropolitan Area has a population of 1,387,985, making it the 4th largest metropolitan area on the Mexico–US border. Matamoros is the 36th most populous city in Mexico and anchors the second largest metropolitan area in Tamaulipas.

The economy of the city is significantly based on its international trade with the United States through the USMCA agreement, and it is home to one of the most promising industrial sectors in Mexico, mainly due to the presence of maquiladoras. In Matamoros, the automotive industry hosts the assembly and accessories plants for brands such as General Motors, Ford, Chrysler, BMW, and Mercedes-Benz. Prior to the growth of the maquiladoras in the 2000s, Matamoros' economy had historically been principally based on agriculture, since northern Mexico's biggest irrigation zones are in the municipality. PEMEX announced a multibillion-peso offshore drilling project for the port of Matamoros, one of the future prospects for Mexico's oil industry.

Matamoros is a major historical site, the site of several battles and events of the Mexican War of Independence, the Mexican Revolution, the Texas Revolution, the Mexican–American War, the American Civil War, and the French Intervention that allowed the city to earn its title of "Undefeated, Loyal, and Heroic". The Mexican National Anthem was played for the first time in public at an opera house, the Teatro de la Reforma (sometimes known as The Opera Theater) in Matamoros.

Matamoros has a semiarid climate, with mild winters and hot, humid summers. Matamoros and Brownsville, Texas, are home to the Charro Days and Sombrero Festival, two-nation fiestas that commemorate the heritage of the U.S. and Mexico which are celebrated every February.

== History ==
=== Foundation ===
In 1519, the same year that Hernán Cortés arrived at the port of Veracruz, a captain named Alonso Álvarez de Pineda carried out a brief expedition to the region of northern Tamaulipas, where he named the town known today as Rio Bravo (Rio Grande) as Rio de las Palmas (Palms River). Nevertheless, the actual founding of Matamoros began in 1686, when Captain Alonso de León explored the area and concluded that the Rio Grande was an excellent route for navigation, and that the area of Matamoros was an ideal spot for cattle raising.

In the year 1749, thirteen enterprising families, twelve from Camargo and one from Reynosa, decided to invest and begin a new, influential cattle industry in the area. Former landowners were skeptical that this new investment would be successful, since the frequent overflow of the Rio Grande caused severe floods, and because ranches were occasionally attacked by Indians. Nonetheless, these thirteen families effectively carried out their business plan and created 113 cattle-raising sites. In the year 1774, they officially named the area San Juan de los Esteros Hermosos, known today as Matamoros.

In 1793, to colonize the province of Nuevo Santander, two Franciscan missionaries named Francisco Pueyes and Manuel Júlio Silva established a parish in the main plaza of Matamoros. They proposed a new name for the community: Villa del Refugio, in honor of the parish and patron saint, Our Lady of the Refuge of the Estuaries.

=== Mexican independence ===
In 1826, the governor Lucas Fernandez dispatched a decree to change the name of the city to Matamoros, in honor of Mariano Matamoros, a hero of the Mexican War of Independence, who participated along with José María Morelos. During the Texas Revolution (1836), Matamoros was the fortress for many Mexican soldiers against rebel attacks.

In 1851, the city of Matamoros was again heroic for defending against attacks by troops under José María Jesús Carbajal, many of whom were recruited from within Texas, who sought to establish a federal republic against the centralist government of Mexico City. The federal troops of Francisco Avalos were able to repel their enemy, and the state congress granted Matamoros the title of "Heroic", countersigned by the Mexican Congress, hence the city's official name of Heroica Matamoros.

The future of the city radically changed after Matamoros declared itself an international free trade zone in 1858. This transformation brought upon urbanization, industrialization, and the expansion of the Bagdad Port, which experienced an economic boom for being the only entrance port for mercenaries for the Confederate States of America during the American Civil War. The Port of Matamoros, also known as the Port of Bagdad, was during the American Civil War one of the leading commercial ports of the world.

=== Texas Revolution ===
The city of Matamoros was a strategic and fortified city during the Texas Revolution. The Matamoros Expedition was launched to attack Matamoros and defeat the forces of Antonio López de Santa Anna. It proved controversial and divisive. The roots of the controversy lay in the division within the provisional government between Governor Henry Smith and the General Council over whether to remain loyal to the Constitution of 1824 and support the liberals of Mexico in the Federalist cause against Santa Anna or to declare independence from Mexico and seek to become an independent territory. The division, on the other hand, was mirrored within the provisional government and among the commanders in the field, who compounded the situation and contributed to the near destruction of the Texian army.

=== American Civil War ===
At the beginning of the American Civil War, the city of Matamoros was simply a sleepy little border town across the Rio Grande from Brownsville. It had, for several years, been considered a port, but it had relatively few ships arriving. Previous to the war, accounts mention that not over six ships entered the port each year. Nevertheless, in about four years, Matamoros, due to its proximity to Texas, was to assume a new status as a port, and multiply its population. A Union general in 1865 described the importance of the port in Matamoros:

Matamoros is to the rebellion west of the Mississippi what New York is to the United States—its great commercial and financial center, feeding and clothing the rebellion, arming and equipping, furnishing it materials of war and a specie basis of circulation that has almost displaced Confederate paper ... The entire Confederate Government is greatly sustained by resources from this port.

The cotton trade brought together in Bagdad, Tamaulipas, and Matamoros over 20,000 speculators from the Union and the Confederacy, England, France, and Germany. Bagdad had grown from a small, seashore outpost to a "full-pledge town". The English-speaking population in the area by 1864 was so great that Matamoros even had a newspaper printed in English—it was called the Matamoros Morning Call. In addition, the port exported cotton to England and France, where millions of people needed it for their daily livelihood, and it was possible to receive fifty cents per pound in gold for cotton, when it cost about three cents in the Confederacy, "and much more money was received for it laid down in New York and European ports". Other sources mention that the port of Matamoros traded with London, Havana, Belize, and New Orleans. The Matamoros and New York City trade agreement, however, continued throughout the war and until 1864, and it was considered "heavy and profitable".

By 1865, Matamoros was described as a prosperous town of 30,000 people, and Lew Wallace informed General Ulysses S. Grant that neither Baltimore or New Orleans could compare itself to the growing commercial activity of Matamoros. Nevertheless, after the collapse of the Confederacy, "gloom, despondency, and despair" became evident in Matamoros—markets shut down, business almost ceased to exist, and ships were rarely seen. "For Sale" signs began to sprout up everywhere, and Matamoros returned to its role of a sleepy little border town across the Rio Grande.

The conclusion of the American Civil War brought a severe crisis to the now abandoned Port of Bagdad, a crisis that until this day the port has never recovered from. In addition, a tremendous hurricane in 1889 destroyed the desolated port. This same hurricane was one of the many hurricanes during the period of devastating hurricanes of 1870 to 1889, which reduced the population of Matamoros to nearly half its size, mounting with it another upsetting economic downturn.

=== French intervention ===
During the French intervention, the port of Baghdad was the scene of the Battle of Baghdad, where the Mexican army defeated the French army and its conservative allies.

=== Mexican Revolution ===
During the course of the Mexican Revolution, the generals Francisco Mújica and Lucio Blanco executed the first agrarian reform for land in the country (1913). Consequently, in the years to come, Matamoros enjoyed another golden era during The Cotton Age, from 1948 to 1962. This epoch placed Matamoros as the largest cotton producer and exporter in the country.

=== Modern era ===
Since the 1970s, and especially during the 1990s, after the initiation of the North American Free Trade Agreement, foreign investment has multiplied in Matamoros, resulting in an enormous population growth, prominently from other Mexican states, like San Luis Potosí and Veracruz.

Many major crimes have occurred in Matamoros, including the 1989 murder of an American tourist, a 1999 standoff and a 2011 mass kidnapping. In 2023, four American tourists were kidnapped. Two of them as well as a Mexican bystander were killed; the other two were rescued by Mexican authorities.

== Demographics ==
The population of the Matamoros locality, measuring 115.3 km^{2}, was 510,739 in 2020 Census, while the entire municipality had 541,979 people covering 4,633 km^{2}.

Historical population
Year	Pop.	±%
2000	418,141	—
2005	462,157	+10.5%
2010	489,193	+5.8%

== Economy ==
=== Industrial sector ===
The economy of Matamoros depends primarily on its proximity to the United States, due to the importance of the strong presence of foreign investment in the area. Maquiladoras are a direct representation of American presence in the state of Tamaulipas; the trade of goods through the international bridges and the flow of people on both sides of the border play a huge role in the economic posture of Matamoros.

Matamoros is home to more than 122 maquiladoras dedicated in its majority to export to the United States. This industry produces technological goods like cables, electrical appliances, electrical components, vehicle parts and accessories, textiles, chemical products, machinery, and computer products. The city operates about 35% of the Tamaulipas' maquiladora industry, placing second, just behind Reynosa. In December 2004, the maquiladora industry employed more than 52,777 workers in Matamoros, an increase of 576 jobs compared to 2003 representing a 60% increase in employment.

=== Commercial sector ===
This economic activity is the second most important in the city of Matamoros, generating approximately 13.5% of the total employment in the municipality. The rapid growth of the population in Matamoros, along with an increase in incomes, have amplified the demand of satisfiers in the area. In the whole state of Tamaulipas, Matamoros places first in terms of jobs and businesses generated by foreign investment in the area, comprising a total of 238 companies, 36% of the state's whole business sector.

=== Agricultural sector ===
The rural area of Matamoros encompasses 97 communities, with more than 36,096 inhabitants in these small agrarian sectors. Traditionally, the city was eminently agricultural, cultivating sorghum, corn, beans, vegetables, and sunflower by millions each year. The terrain in Matamoros categorized in two factions: gley soil, land that is only used for grazing by livestock, and arable land, used solely for growing crops.

The municipality of Matamoros is within the Rio Grande river basin, and by means of irrigation, the agricultural sector flourishes in production. The two main water suppliers are the Rio Grande and the Arroyo del Tigre, which have dams that irrigate the region.

=== Livestock production ===
The bovine is the most predominant livestock in the municipality of Matamoros, and the commercialization of its meat is the principal income of ranchers in the region. In fact, livestock production goes as the following: bovine (62%), pigs (16%), and sheep (9%).

In the northern part of Tamaulipas, near the municipality of Matamoros, the breeding of calves is characterized and well known for having European blood. However, this is only seen among specialized, high quality meat industries that breed Charolais cattle, Simmental cattle, and the Zebus.

=== Fishing industry ===
Matamoros has more than 117 km (73 mi) of coastline on the Gulf of Mexico, and a total of 70,000 hectares (170,000 acres) of the Laguna Madre. In addition, there are fishing activities in spots like Higuerillas, la Capilla, Rincón de las Flores, el Mezquital, and Playa Bagdad. The city has 10 fishing corporations operating in all of these areas.

== Tourism ==
=== Bagdad Beach ===
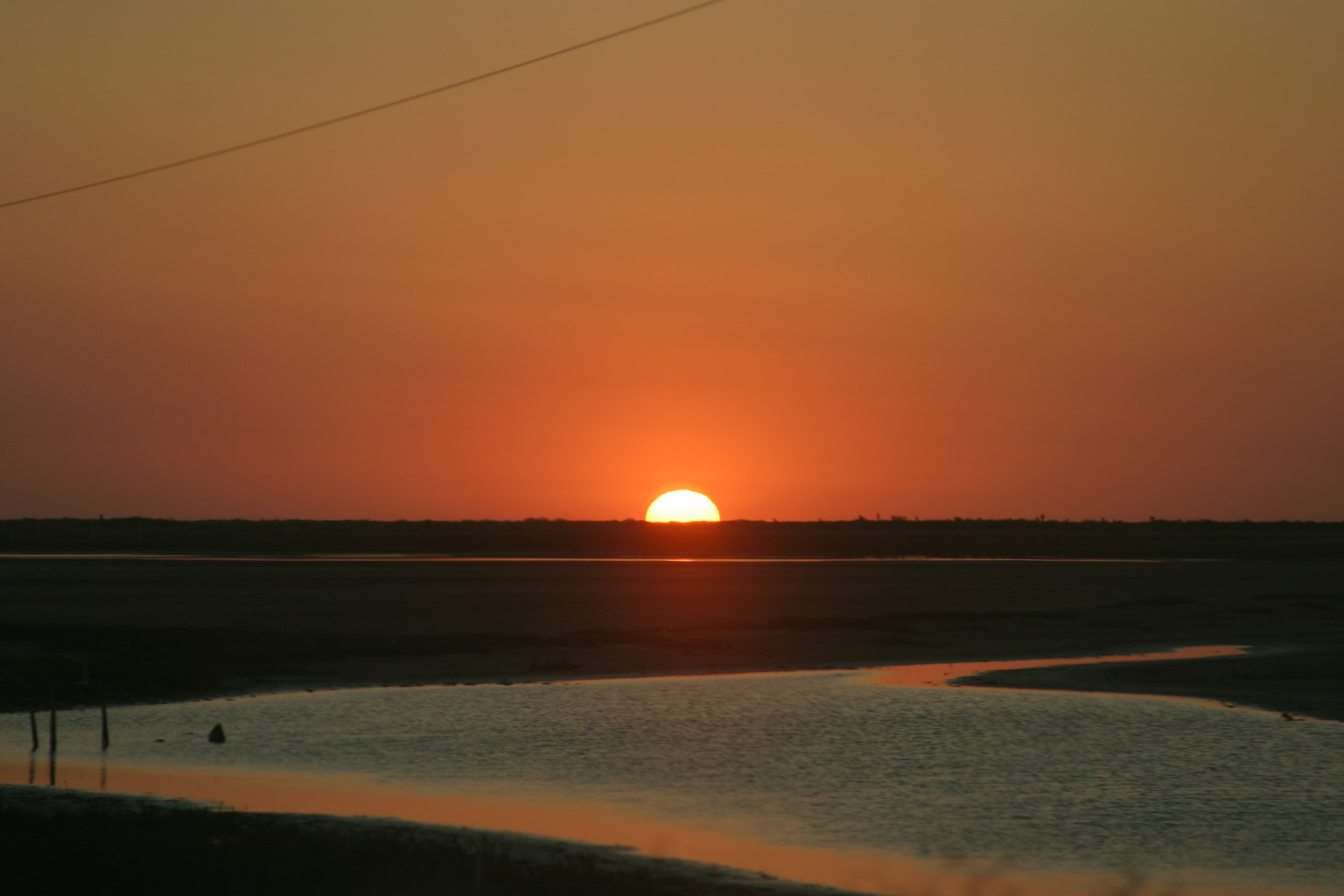
Sunset at Playa Bagdad

Bagdad Beach (Playa Bagdad), also known as Lauro Villar Beach, is 27 km (17 mi) east of Matamoros. At Playa Bagdad, fishing tournaments are held each year, attracting participants from all over the state of Tamaulipas. During Holy Week, it attracts many visitors, primarily from Nuevo León. During this period, the beach hosts several concerts, sport tournaments, and festivals. In 2014, Mayor Leticia Salazar proposed to change the beach's name to Costa Azul, in reference to Matamoros-native Rigo Tovar and to his band.

In 1985, during the yearly festival of 'Festival del Mar,' Rigo Tovar, along with other important attractions, played in Playa Bagdad. Other second tier bands like 'La Firma', 'La Mira de Linares,' and 'La Leyenda,' along with several other pop groups, have also played during the month of April, the most visited period of the year. In addition, Playa Bagdad has several seafood restaurants. Jet ski, surfing, and even motocross and off-road 4x4 racing are allowed with few area restrictions. In a single day during summer breaks, the number of visitors can reach 180,000.

=== Cultural attractions ===
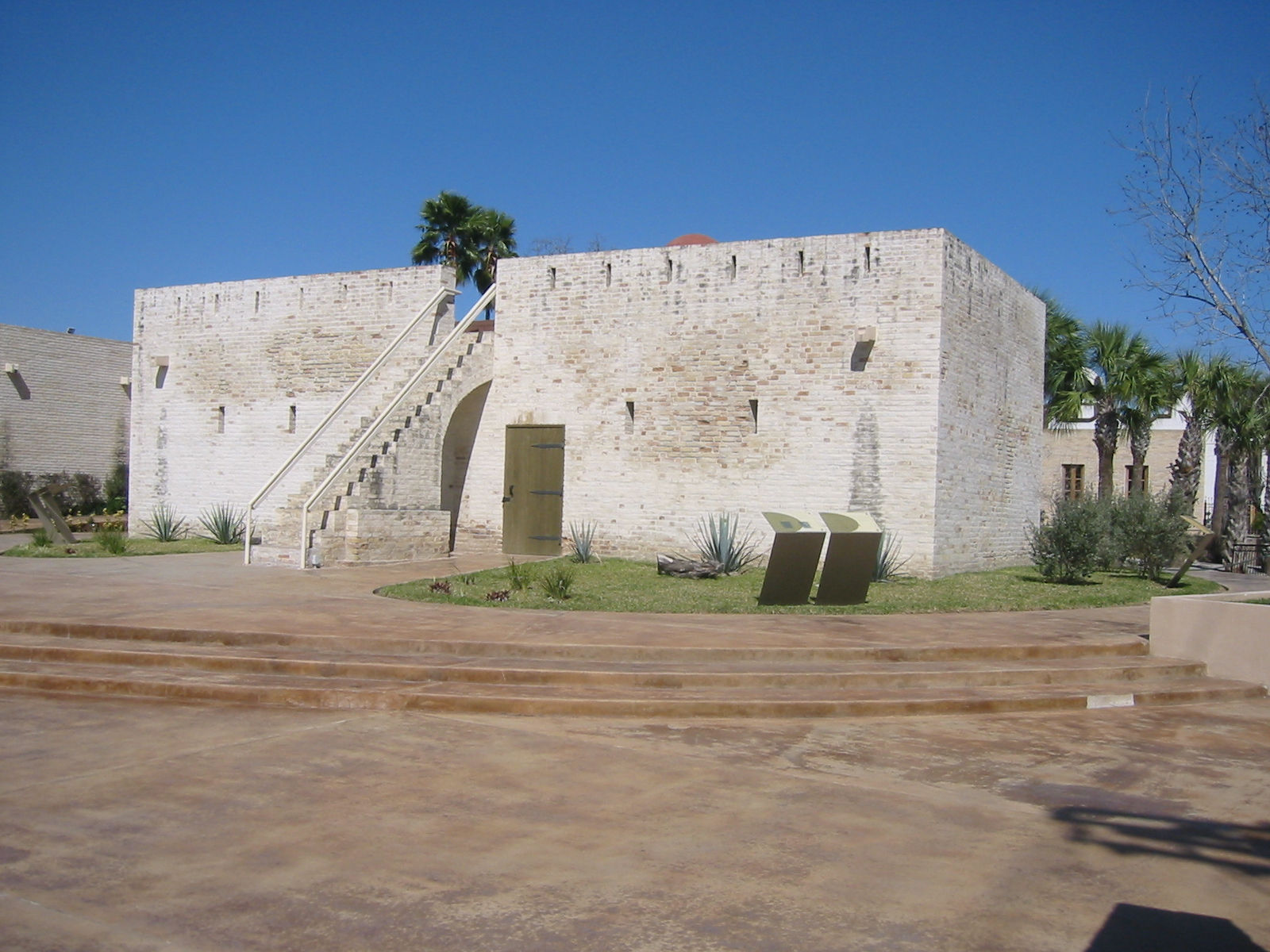
Museum of Casamata

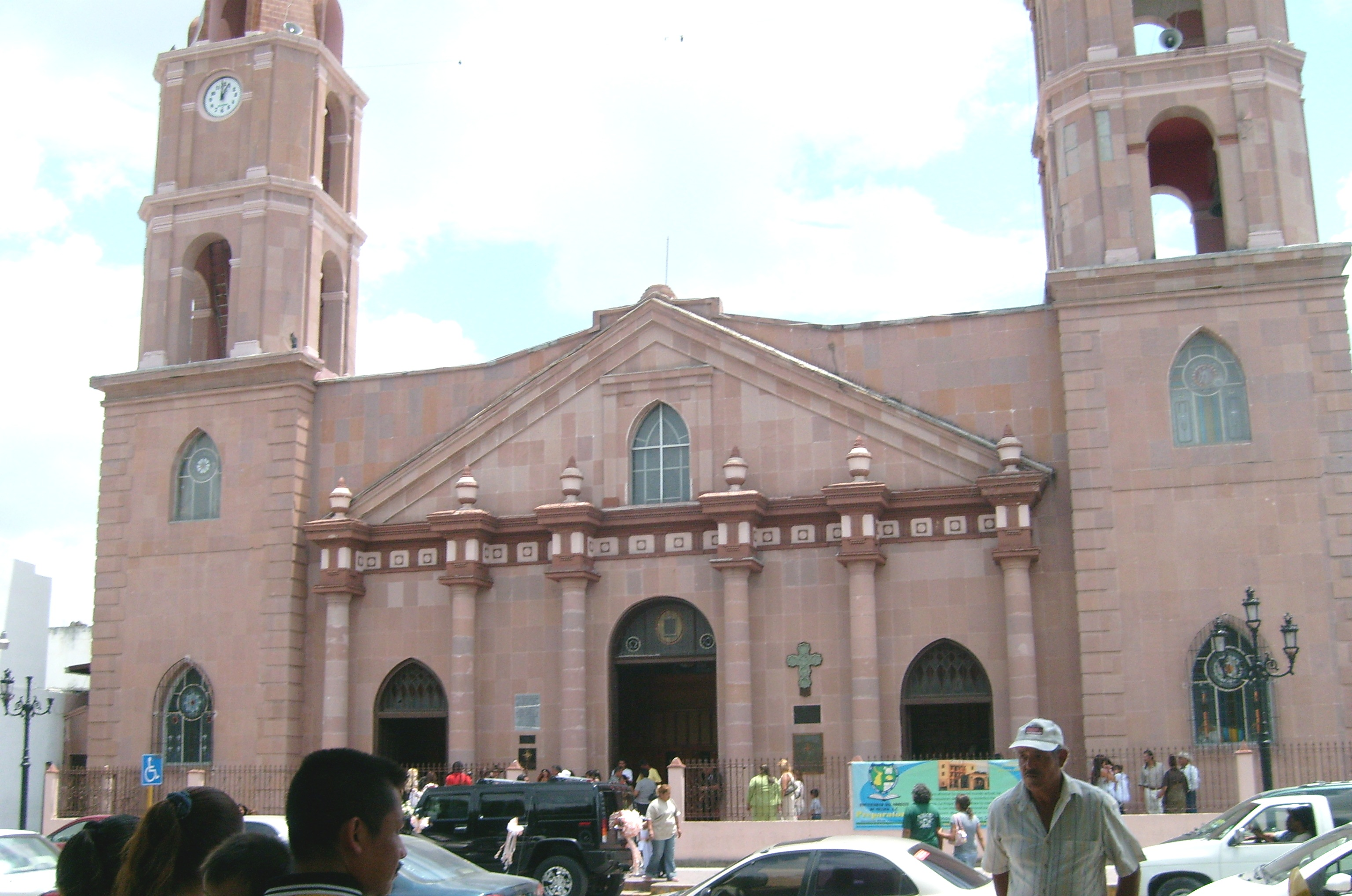
Catedral Nuestra Señora del Refugio

Fortress of Casamata, converted into Museum Casamata in 1970, was a bastion that now guards a fine collection of prehispanic figurines and artifacts dating from central historic moments: the Spanish colonist era, the Mexican War of Independence, and the contentious Mexican Revolution. Unique and curious items are also exhibited, such as an iron casket where the remains of fearless General Canales once rested (fought against both American and French invasions) and the dark tunnels lounged beneath the construction, inevitable reference for local horror stories. The existence of a multipurpose hall and newspaper library also provide extra interest to the museum. The museum was founded by Don Eliseo Paredes Manzano, the city's first "cronista" and recognized historian.

The 'Museo de Arte Contemporáneo de Tamaulipas (MACT),' inaugurated in 1969, is the largest and most important art museum in the city, and one of the most memorable in the state of Tamaulipas. Art and photo exhibitions are held yearlong at MACT. Artworks from Mexico City, Monterrey, New York City, Los Angeles, Milan, and Paris have been displayed at this museum.

The central 'plaza' in Matamoros is home to the Presidential Offices, the Cathedral of Nuestra Señora Villa del Refugio, and of the Casino Matamorense, along with other historical buildings. The 'Teatro Reforma', the most important theater in the city, is found a few blocks away. On 28 January 1829, the plaza was named after the heroic and historical figure Miguel Hidalgo y Costilla, who fought in the Mexican War of Independence. Moreover, the Cathedral of Nuestra Señora Villa del Refugio, constructed in 1831, was one of the first mayor constructions and is one of the present symbols of the city. Its neoclassical architecture, along with its rich, historical background, attracts visitors yearlong. The Casino Matamorense, constructed in 1950, is traditionally considered the center of social gatherings for the principal families of Matamoros. Also with its unique architecture, Centro Cultural Olimpico, is a historical creation built in the city. Nothing like it had been done before. And finally, the 'Teatro Reforma,' once considered the 'House of the Opera of the 19th Century', was constructed in 1861. For decades, the theater was home to important balls held by the richest families of Matamoros and the high-ranking military officers of the state. In addition, 'Teatro Reforma' is well known for being the first place in history where the Mexican National Anthem was played.

On 10 April 2002, the Museum of Mexican Agrarianism was founded. Its collection pertain to agrarianism and land reform.

=== Medical tourism ===
As of 2023, Matamoros has been a destination for US Americans seeking healthcare or cosmetic surgery at prices lower than in the US. In May 2023, the CDC reported about an outbreak of fungal meningitis in US residents returning from Matamoros after medical or surgical procedures including liposuction involving injection of an anesthetic into the area around the spinal column i.e., epidural anesthesia. As of June 1, the causative agent had been identified as Fusarium solani.

== Geography ==
The city is located on the southern bank of the Rio Grande, directly across the border from Brownsville, Texas, United States.

=== Climate ===
The city of Matamoros has a warm humid subtropical climate (Köppen climate classification Cfa), with mild winters, and hot, humid summers. Its proximity to the Gulf of Mexico accompanies cooler winds during the summers and winters, compared to its sister cities of Reynosa and Nuevo Laredo, which are farther inland. Moreover, the climate of Matamoros is subtropical, with relatively low precipitation patterns distributed throughout the summer, and with summer temperatures ranging from 30 to 40 °C (86 to 104 °F). Temperatures above 38 °C (100 °F) are very uncommon, just as the other extreme, where freezing temperatures during the winter are rarely seen as well. While on average the warmest month is August, the March record high shows influence from the tropical wet and dry climates located further south in Mexico, where the temperatures soar to their yearly maximums in March and April before decreasing somewhat during the rainy season.

Heavy rainfall is usually seen during the months of July and August, although it is not uncommon to go about without any rain whatsoever during the "wet" season. The average temperatures during the winters usually range around 0–10 °C (32–50 °F); this seasons is usually attended with rain, drizzle, and fog. The last snowfall was seen on 25 December 2004, which is the heaviest snowfall ever recorded in the city, with up to 3.8 cm (1.5 in) in one day. Despite its proximity to the humid Gulf Coast, the city is dry, receiving an average of 698 mm (27.48 in) of precipitation annually.

Climate data for Matamoros, Tamaulipas (1991–2020 normals, extremes 1951–present)
Month	Jan	Feb	Mar	Apr	May	Jun	Jul	Aug	Sep	Oct	Nov	Dec	Year
Record high °C (°F)	34 (93)	35 (95)	41 (106)	40 (104)	42 (107)	43 (109)	42 (107)	44 (111)	41 (105)	37 (98)	37 (98)	35 (95)	44.0 (111.2)
Mean daily maximum °C (°F)	22.0 (71.6)	24.2 (75.6)	26.5 (79.7)	28.8 (83.8)	31.4 (88.5)	33.5 (92.3)	34.4 (93.9)	35.0 (95.0)	33.0 (91.4)	30.3 (86.5)	26.4 (79.5)	23.2 (73.8)	29.1 (84.3)
Daily mean °C (°F)	17.2 (63.0)	19.3 (66.7)	21.9 (71.4)	24.8 (76.6)	27.6 (81.7)	29.5 (85.1)	30 (86.)	30.2 (86.4)	28.4 (83.1)	25.5 (77.9)	21.6 (70.9)	18.2 (64.8)	24.5 (76.1)
Mean daily minimum °C (°F)	12.0 (53.6)	14.0 (57.2)	16.5 (61.7)	19.1 (66.4)	22.0 (71.6)	23.8 (74.8)	24.0 (75.2)	24.0 (75.2)	22.8 (73.0)	19.6 (67.3)	15.8 (60.4)	13.0 (55.4)	18.9 (66.0)
Record low °C (°F)	−8 (18)	−11 (12)	−3 (26)	3 (37)	5 (41)	13 (55)	14 (57)	16 (60)	11 (51)	2 (35)	−3 (27)	−9 (15)	−11 (12)
Average precipitation mm (inches)	33 (1.30)	19 (0.74)	29 (1.13)	23 (0.92)	43 (1.70)	45 (1.78)	58 (2.28)	43 (1.68)	97 (3.82)	63 (2.49)	34 (1.34)	33 (1.30)	636 (25.02)
Average precipitation days (≥ 0.01 in)	7	6	4	4	5	6	5	7	10	8	6	7	74
Mean monthly sunshine hours	130.2	152.6	207.7	234.0	266.6	306.0	334.8	306.9	252.0	229.4	165.0	130.2	2,715.4
Source 1: NOAA (normals 1981–2010)
Source 2: Hong Kong Observatory (sun, 1961–1990)

== International bridges ==
The international exchange of goods and services between the U.S. and Mexico is seen in effect throughout the city of Matamoros with the presence of its four international bridges. Matamoros is the only border city on the U.S.-Mexico border that has four international bridges.

- Brownsville & Matamoros International Bridge (B&M): It is popularly known as the "Old Bridge" or Puente Viejo, because of its original incarnation in 1904.
- Gateway International Bridge: Popularly known as the "New Bridge" or Puente Nuevo. This bridge connects downtown Matamoros to Brownsville, Texas, just a block away from the University of Texas at Brownsville. It is the most used international bridge for pedestrian crossings in the city.
- Veterans International Bridge: Commonly known as "Los Tomates Bridge", this gateway is the largest and newest bridge in the Brownsville-Matamoros metropolitan area.
- Free Trade International Bridge: Commonly known as Los Indios Bridge, this international bridge crosses the Rio Grande, connecting Matamoros to the border city of Los Indios, Texas.

== Notable people ==
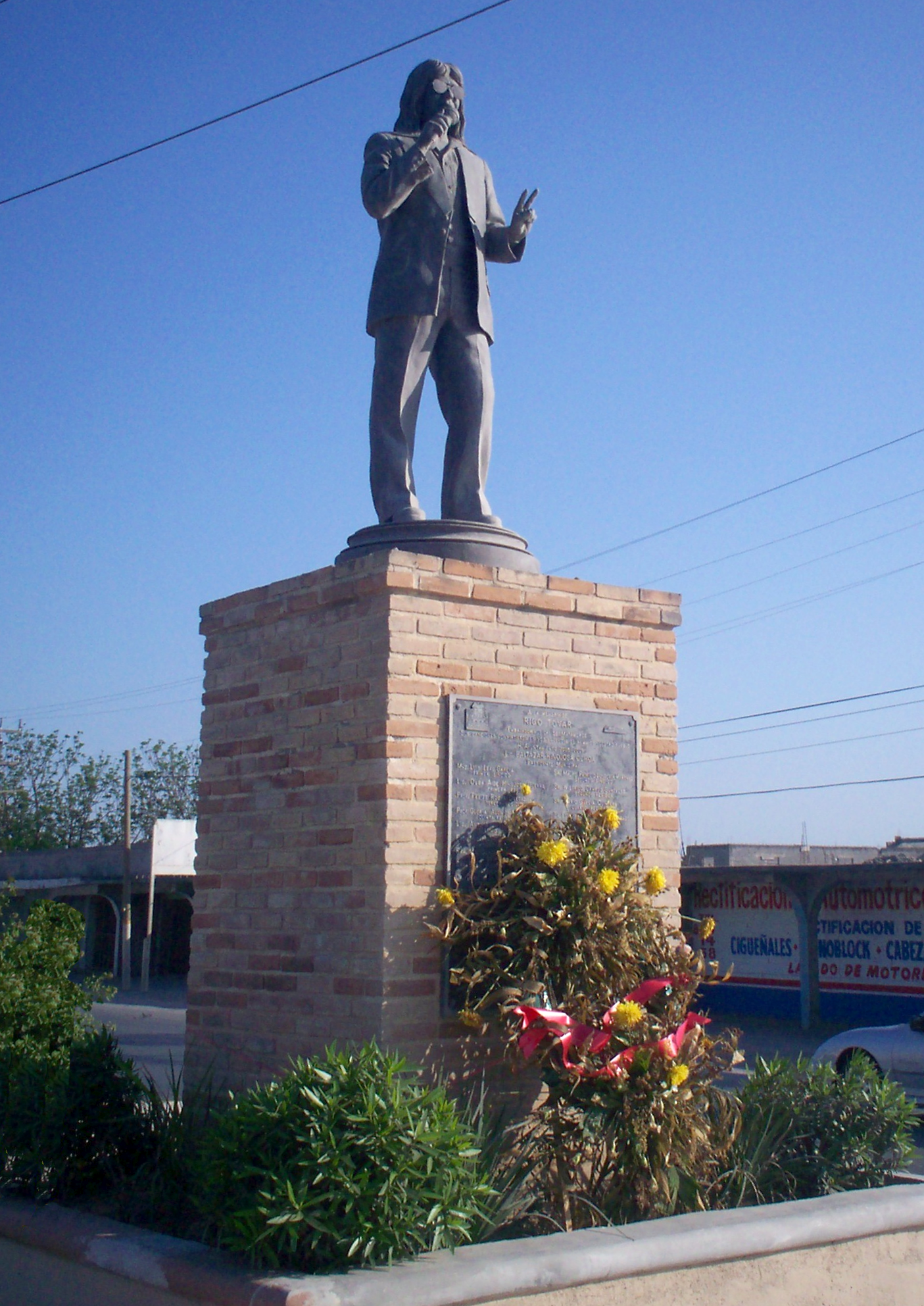
Bronze statue honoring Rigo Tovar in Matamoros, Tamaulipas

- Manuel González Flores (1833–1893): Soldier and politician, who also served as President of Mexico. He also played important roles in the French Intervention and in the Reform War with Benito Juárez.
- Pedro Hinojosa (1820–1903): military officer and politician, who served as governor of Coahuila, Nuevo León, and Chihuahua; played vital roles in the French Intervention, in the Mexican–American War, and in the Reform War.
- Lauro Villar Ochoa (1865–1913): Mexican general who defended Francisco I. Madero during La Decena Trágica.
- Gregorio Cortez (1875–1916): Mexican American outlaw in the American Old West who became a folk hero to Mexicans living in South Texas.
- Rigo Tovar (1946–2005): Cumbia singer who is considered the musical pioneer of fusing electric guitars, synthesizers and rock melody with traditional Mexican music.
- Carlos Cascos (1952–2024): former Secretary of State of Texas, former county judge in Cameron County, Texas, born in Matamors, naturalized American citizen.
- Carlos de los Cobos (born 1958): former soccer player and current manager who played in Club América and in C.F. Monterrey while also participating in the World Cup '86.
- Cristina Rivera Garza (born 1964) is a Mexican writer who won the prestigious Sor Juana Inés de la Cruz Prize in 2001 and 2009, becoming the first writer to win the prize twice.
- Raúl Gárate Legleú (1896–1977): Military general and former governor of Tamaulipas; named police chief of Mexico City in 1920 and Subsecretary of National Defense of Mexico in 1947.
- Guadalupe Mainero (1856–1912): lawyer, journalist, and governor of Tamaulipas in 1896. In addition, he served as the president of the Supreme Court in Mexico in 1888.
- Adalberto J. Argüelles (1850–1923): professor, member of parliament, and served as director of the Educación Federal, La Sociedad Benefactora, and as member of Alianza Obrera Progresista.
- Eliseo Paredes Manzano (1899–1988): businessman and journalist who served as mayor of Matamoros. He was the founder of Crédito Industrial de Monterrey and of Asociación de Charros, treasurer of Comité Pro-Educación local, director of Cruz Roja, president of Club Rotario, and commander of Tercer Batallón Regional de la Defensa Civil.
- Carlos Quintero Lamar (1863–1933): lawyer and diplomat who studied in Tulane University. He later served as consul in the country of Costa Rica and in New Orleans, U.S.
- Raúl Brindis (born 1963): Mexican radio personality.
- Sara Aldrete (born 1964): serial killer known as "La Madrina" (The Godmother).
- Juan Nepomuceno Guerra (1915–2001): Mexican crime lord, bootlegger, businessman, drug smuggler, founder of the Gulf Cartel and uncle of Juan García Abrego
- Juan García Abrego (born 1944): Mexican drug lord, the former leader of the Gulf Cartel and nephew of Juan Nepomuceno Guerra
- José Manuel Garza Rendón (born 1952): Mexican drug lord and high-ranking member of the Gulf Cartel
- Osiel Cárdenas Guillén (born 1967): Mexican drug lord, the former leader of both the Gulf Cartel and Los Zetas, and brother of Antonio Cárdenas Guillén, Mario Cárdenas Guillén and Homero Cárdenas Guillén
- Antonio Cárdenas Guillén (1962–2010): Mexican drug lord, co-leader of the Gulf Cartel and brother of Osiel Cárdenas Guillén, Mario Cárdenas Guillén and Homero Cárdenas Guillén
- Mario Cárdenas Guillén, Mexican drug lord, former leader of Gulf Cartel and brother of Osiel Cárdenas Guillén, Antonio Cárdenas Guillén and Homero Cárdenas Guillén
- Homero Cárdenas Guillén (1966–2014): Mexican drug lord, former leader of Gulf Cartel and brother of Osiel Cárdenas Guillén, Antonio Cárdenas Guillén and Mario Cárdenas Guillén
- Rafael Cárdenas Vela: Mexican drug lord, high-ranking lieutenant of the Gulf Cartel and nephew of Antonio Cárdenas Guillén, Osiel Cárdenas Guillén, Mario Cárdenas Guillén and Homero Cárdenas Guillén
- Jorge Eduardo Costilla Sánchez (born 1971): Mexican drug lord and former leader of Gulf Cartel
- Samuel Flores Borrego (1972–2011): Mexican drug lord and high-ranking lieutenant of the Gulf Cartel
- Abel Briones Ruiz (born 1973): Mexican business owner, suspected drug lord and member of the Gulf Cartel
- Juan Carlos de la Cruz Reyna (born 1974/1975): Mexican drug lord and high-ranking member of the Gulf Cartel
- Héctor David Delgado Santiago (1975–2013): Mexican drug lord and high-ranking leader of the Gulf Cartel
- Eduardo Almanza Morales, Mexican drug lord, high-ranking member of the Los Zetas and brother of Raymundo Almanza Morales
- Líctor Hazael Marroquín García, Mexican criminal and convicted vehicle thief
- Nelson Terán (born 1968), musician

== Sister cities ==
- Brownsville, Texas (2009)

== See also ==
- Northern Mexico
