= 2011 Matamoros mass kidnapping =

- Part of Mexican drug war
- Newspaper showing the monetary reward offered for the five Cázares that remain missing
- Location: 25°52′47″N 97°30′15″W; Matamoros, Tamaulipas, Mexico
- Date: 9 July 2011; 5:00 a.m. – 8:00 a.m. (CST)
- Target: Cázares family
- Attack type: Mass kidnapping
- Victims: 18 (5 remain missing)
- Perpetrator: Gulf Cartel
- Motive: Unknown

On 9 July 2011, affiliates of the Gulf Cartel kidnapped 18 members of the Cázares family from three different households in Matamoros, Tamaulipas, Mexico. The women and children were released three days later, but the abductors kept five men. Forty-eight hours later, the Gulf Cartel contacted the family members who had been released to negotiate a ransom. After several days of negotiation and several ransom payments totaling US$100,000, the Cázares were called to deliver their final payment on 27 July. They sent the money to the kidnappers and waited at a specified location for a white van the kidnappers promised would deliver their remaining family members. However, the van never arrived and the phone the kidnappers used to contact the Cázares went out of service. The family then decided to contact the authorities for a criminal investigation.

The mass kidnapping of the Cázares family stands out from other abduction cases in Mexico because all eighteen victims were related. Among them were three U.S. citizens. The family has sent letters to officials at all levels of the Mexican government and has reached out to international heads of state for assistance with the case. The kidnapping remains unsolved; the whereabouts of the five remaining abductees, and the motive behind their kidnapping, are officially unknown. Mexican government sources, however, agree that the kidnapping was masterminded by the top echelons of the Gulf Cartel.

== Kidnapping ==
At around 5:00 a.m. on 9 July 2011, at least eight gunmen aligned with the Gulf Cartel entered the first Cázares' family home in the San Francisco neighborhood of Matamoros, Tamaulipas, Mexico, to carry out a kidnapping. This house was owned by Rodolfo Cázares Garza. The kidnappers were wearing military-style uniforms and ski masks. However, the victims noticed they were sporting white-colored sneakers, speaking vulgarities, and looking for valuable possessions in the house, which suggested they were not law enforcement or military personnel. They stormed the home's bedrooms to round up the victims before blindfolding them (except for two children). Once the kidnappers ordered the patriarch to open the family's safe, they forced the family into their vehicles before taking off. By 7:00 am, the Gulf Cartel kidnappers reached the second Cázares' home in the Río neighborhood and forced the family to open their front door. "We have your brother", one of the kidnappers said as the others guarded the entrance booth to the neighborhood with assault rifles. Four more relatives were kidnapped at the second home, owned by Rodolfo's brother Héctor Cázares Garza. However, one family member managed to escape through the back door of the house before running to a third Cázares' home a few blocks away. A few minutes later, the kidnappers made their way into the third house, owned by Alberto Cázares Garza, one of the brothers. By 8:00 am, 18 members of the Cázares family had been kidnapped. This mass abduction stood out from other kidnapping cases in Mexico because all the victims were related.

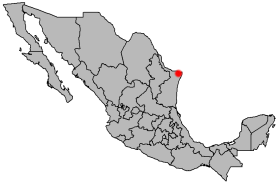
Location of Matamoros, Tamaulipas (red spot) within Mexico

Six of the Cázares men, Rodolfo Cázares Garza, Manuel Alberto Cázares Garza, Héctor Cázares Garza, Rodolfo Ignacio Cázares Solís, Rubén Luna Mendoza, and Rodolfo Garza Solís, were kept together. The women and children, along with one of the grandfathers, were kept in a separate vehicle throughout most of the first day. After leaving the house, the captors drove them around the city for several hours and switched them into different vehicles on busy streets in broad daylight. The kidnappers stole several of the vehicles from the families' homes. According to one family member, the kidnappers even stopped for gas and did not pay for the service. In their portable radio conversations while driving, the family heard them speaking about avoiding Los Zetas, the rival crime syndicate of the Gulf Cartel. That evening, the women were taken to a hostage safe house where at least 20 other men were drinking and smoking cannabis. The windows in this undisclosed location were covered. A shootout broke out near the premises. The abductees were blindfolded, seated next to a corpse, and transported to a different location in another SUV. The Cázares had the impression the kidnappers were looking for a place to hide them. The family believes the kidnappers moved them around Matamoros for hours because they did not expect to find the number of people they had in the houses where they carried out the abductions.

Despite the turmoil, the kidnappers tried to keep the victims calm. They told the family they had inadvertently mistaken their identities and that they were going to be released. "We're from the Gulf Cartel", one of them told them. "We're the good guys". (Note: In the kidnappers' perspective, the "bad guys" were the members of Los Zetas.) The women said that although they were scared of a few of their captors, for the most part, the kidnappers treated them well. The Cázares recall younger members of the kidnapping ring were the kindest, gave the adults bread and milk, and the children juice to drink. Some of them allowed the victims to remove their blindfolds while the gang's boss was gone. The women and children were kept in a safe house with gunmen for another three days. On 11 July, the kidnappers released the women and children around midnight at a Walmart parking lot. Five Cázares men, however, remained in captivity. Rodolfo Garza Solís, 82, was released by his captors 16 days after the kidnapping.

== Ransoming ==
On 13 July, the kidnappers contacted Sergio Cázares Garza, one of the family members who lived in Texas and told him that his kidnapped relatives would be released if the family paid a ransom. Initially, the family said they could pay only a few thousand dollars, but the captors allowed them at least two days to collect more money. In total, the Cázares made four different payments to the kidnappers in Matamoros totalling US$100,000. (Note: Another source said the Cázares made five ransom payments of the same amount.) The first payment was delivered to a grocery store parking lot; the second was left behind a fast-food eatery. The kidnappers communicated with the Cázares family hiding in Texas by telephone. A trusted family employee in Matamoros made the cash deliveries. Each time a delivery was made, the Gulf Cartel sent a different envoy to pick up the money.

During the ransoming process, the Cázares were allowed to talk with the hostages on three occasions. In their first phone conversation, the victims talked about their concern for their wives and children. Their second conversation, however, was a lot shorter and emotional for the Cázares. By 27 July, the kidnappers said they needed a final cash delivery to release their captives. The Cázares sent the money to Matamoros from Texas and eagerly awaited at a prearranged location for a white van that was supposed to deliver their relatives. The van never came and the phone line the family used to contact the kidnappers was out of service. Weeks after that, the family decided to contact law enforcement. (Note: This course of action is a common practice in Mexico, where most kidnappings go unreported because citizens tend to distrust law enforcement. Popular belief holds that authorities are often involved with organized crime or are incapable of properly investigating the case. This practice is also rooted in the fear that calling the authorities may compel the captors to kill the victim.)

== Initial proceedings ==
Once the Cázares decided to ask for help from law enforcement, the local police stated that they were going to investigate the case. However, about a month later, they wrote to the Cázares saying the case was outside their jurisdiction. The family tried to contact the police by e-mail and telephone, and even attempted to contact the mayor of Matamoros, Alfonso Sánchez Garza, but their messages were not answered. On 13 September 2011, the Cázares issued a formal complaint at the Public Ministry of Matamoros (Spanish: Ministerio Público de Matamoros) and the case was opened by state authorities in Ciudad Victoria, Tamaulipas. A family member who was a U.S. citizen also contacted the FBI and asked them for help with the case. It was brought to the attention of Texas Governor Rick Perry, who promised to support the investigation. A few weeks after that, one of the alleged kidnappers was arrested in Texas following a traffic violation. That same month, a Tamaulipas' anti-kidnapping squad began to work on the case and collected testimony from the Cázares who had been kidnapped and released.

Location of Tamaulipas (red) within Mexico

In October 2011, Mexican Navy soldiers visited the three houses where the Cázares were abducted to investigate the crime scenes. In November 2011, Mexican security forces arrested two suspects on federal charges for drug and weapons offenses. According to the agency's investigator, Manuel Adolfo Benavides Parra, the Cázares identified the two men as part of the Gulf Cartel kidnapping ring. However, since the two suspects were arrested under federal charges, his agency was prevented from interrogating them. At the same time, a Tamaulipas law enforcement official stated that the case was under state jurisdiction and refused to comment on the two detainees arrested for federal offenses. U.S. authorities also did not provide details on the other alleged suspect arrested in Texas. In November 2011, a friend of the Cázares managed to put them in contact with Deputy Interior Secretary Felipe Zamora Castro, a high-ranking official within the Mexican government, who said he was willing to help with the kidnapping investigation. A couple of days after being in contact with the family, however, Zamora died in a helicopter accident along with Secretary of the Interior Francisco Blake Mora. In December 2011, the Cázares case was received by Gualberto Ramírez, coordinator of the Anti-Kidnapping Unit of the now-defunct Subprocuraduría de Investigación Especializada en Delincuencia Organizada (SIEDO), Mexico's organized crime investigatory agency. (Note: The organized crime investigatory agency Subprocuraduría de Investigación Especializada en Delincuencia Organizada (SIEDO) changed its name to Subprocuraduría Especializada en Investigación de Delincuencia Organizada (SEIDO) on 17 October 2012.)

By 2012, the Cázares claimed the Tamaulipas' agency had not questioned potential suspects or eyewitnesses to the kidnapping, nor had they visited the locations relevant to the case. The Cázares have insisted that authorities should start by investigating the house where they were taken following their kidnapping, given that it is located just a block away from a busy street in Matamoros. In March 2012, an electricity bill was found on the door of the premises. The bill showed that there was significant electricity use during the month the family was kidnapped, and the last time someone paid the bill was in January 2011. A neighbor who lived near the house where the Cázares were held hostage said he did not know who the owners of the property were but acknowledged seeing suspicious activity during the evenings. On 7 March, about 10 months after the kidnappings, Gérald Martin, the general consul of France in Mexico, told the Cázares family that a squadron of Mexico's Federal Police had been dispatched to Matamoros to work on the case directly. The family claims, however, they are not sure if the investigation was carried out. They said they did not receive any documents concerning the investigation. By October 2012, a criminal court in Jalisco, under Judge Francisco Martín Hernández Zaragoza, was assigned to investigate the case. The family claims they do not know the details of his investigation.

== Letters to heads of state ==
=== Mexico ===
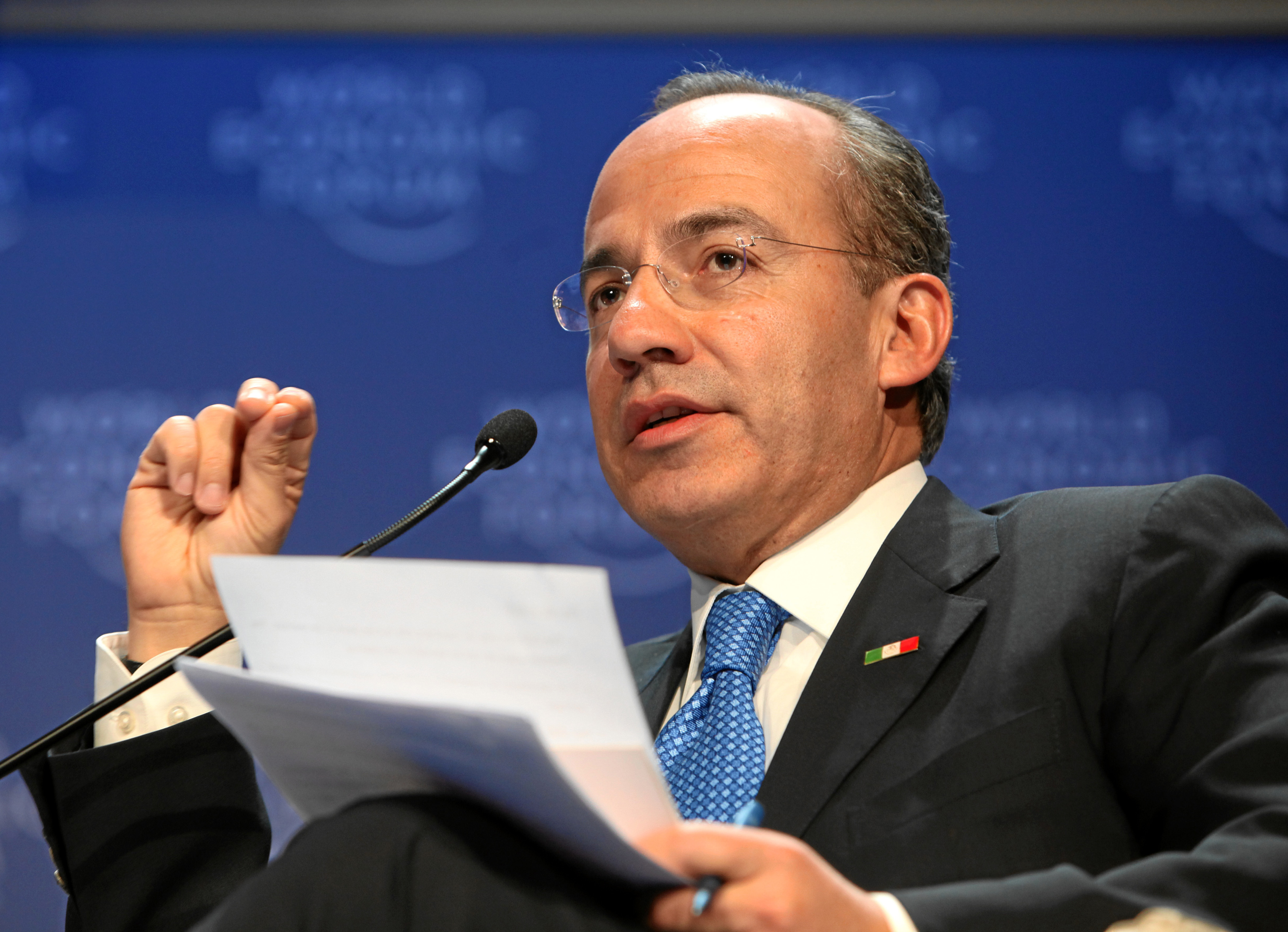
Mexico's President Felipe Calderón in a press conference

Exactly six months after the kidnapping, on 9 January 2012, the Cázares sent a letter to Mexico's former President Felipe Calderón titled "Request Special Military and Police Assistance Regarding a Kidnapping in Matamoros" (Spanish: Solicitud de ayuda militar y policial especial respecto a un secuestro en Matamoros). Copies of the document were also sent to other high-ranking government officials including: Marisela Morales, the attorney general of Mexico; Eugenio Javier Hernández Flores, the former governor of Tamaulipas; Egidio Torre Cantú, governor of Tamaulipas; Rick Perry, governor of Texas; Alejandro Poiré Romero, former secretary of Interior; Patricia Espinosa Cantellano, former secretary of Foreign Affairs; Rodolfo Quilantán Arenas, Mexican consul in Brownsville, Texas; Carlos de Icaza González, Mexico's ambassador to France; Francisco González Díaz, Mexico's ambassador to Germany; Gérald Martin, the general consul of France in Mexico; Guillermo Galván Galván, the secretary of National Defense; General Erwin Rodolfo Solórzano Barragán of the Mexican Army; Jaime Domingo López Buitrón, director of the Center for Research and National Security; Rafael Lomelí Martínez, former secretary of Public Security in Tamaulipas; Bolívar Hernández Garza, former Tamaulipas attorney general; Raúl Plascencia Villanueva, director of Mexico's National Human Rights Commission; Luis González Plascencia, head of Mexico City's Human Rights Commission; Antonio Aranibar Quiroga, Mexico's ambassador to the Organization of American States; and Edgardo Buscaglia, a professor at the Instituto Tecnológico Autónomo de México and organized crime expert. Three days later, the Mexican government replied to the request and stated that the case was given to the Procuraduría Social de Atención a Víctimas de Delitos, a government agency specializing in aiding victims of violence. The Cázares claimed, however, that that government agency never contacted them. Attorney General Morales responded the next day by appointing José Cuitláhuac Salinas Martínez, the deputy attorney general of the SIEDO, to work directly on the case.

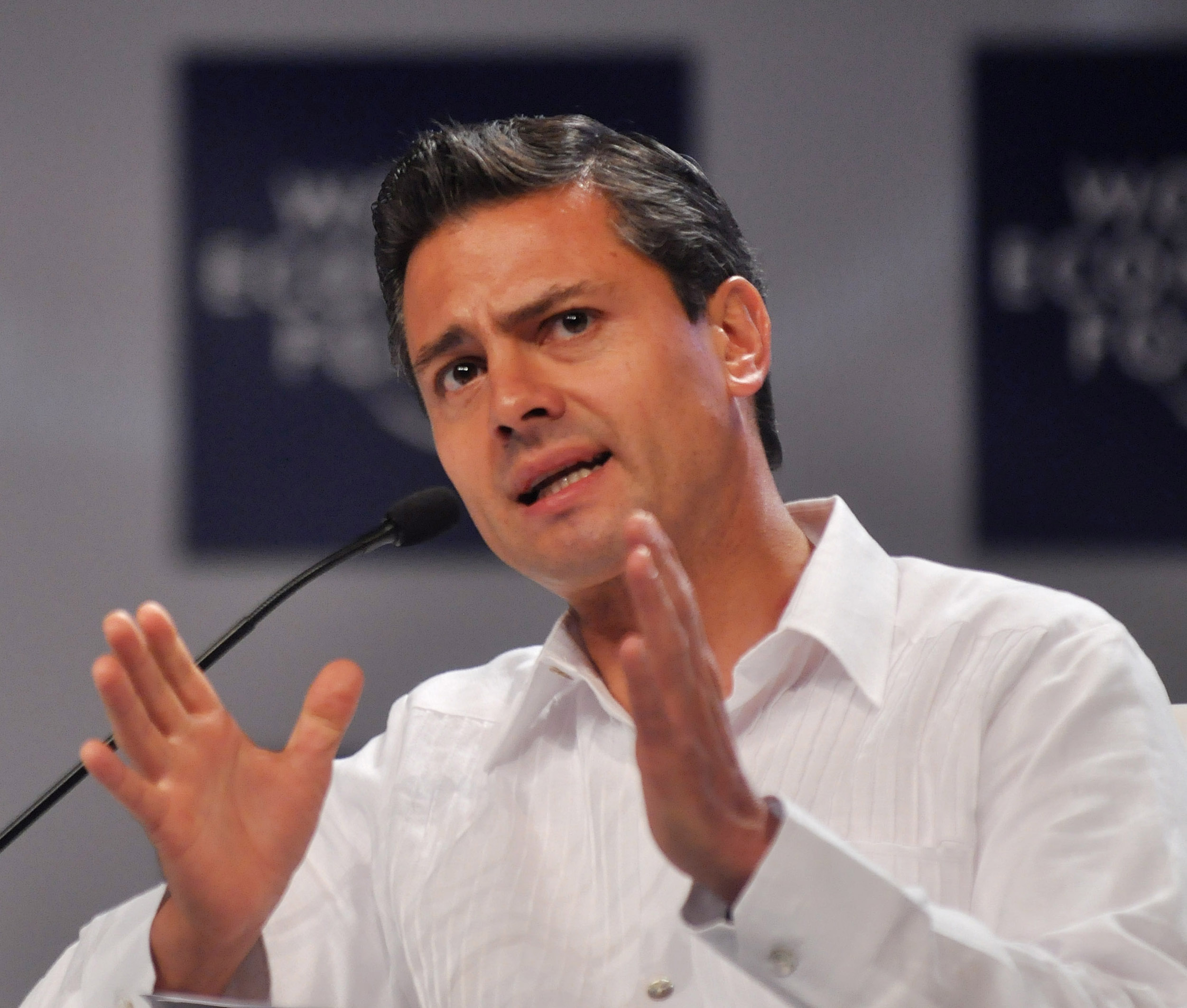
Mexico's President Enrique Peña Nieto in a press conference

Ludivine Barbier, a French-native and wife of Rodolfo Cázares, gathered 72,041 signatures through Change.org in late 2012, and asked Mexican President Enrique Peña Nieto to help bring her husband back. The petition was also directed to politicians Miguel Ángel Osorio Chong, Luis Videgaray Caso, and Erwin Manuel Lino Zárate. In the petition, Barbier complained that Mexican authorities had been silent about the case, and the police have ignored them for over a year. She stated that Peña Nieto had to improve his image abroad and argued that if her petition managed to gather signatures from all over the world, he would have no other option but to work on the case. Barbier also joined in solidarity with Frédérique Santal, the sister of Olivier Tschumi, a Swiss native who was kidnapped in Cuernavaca, Morelos in 2010 and remains disappeared. In December 2012, both met in Paris with Mexican peace activist Javier Sicilia, who handed over a petition Mexico's ambassador to France. The petition intended to ask Peña Nieto to enact a law protecting victims of violence in Mexico. Barbier also gave the petition letter for Peña Nieto to Juan Andrés Ordóñez Gómez, who managed the administrative duties of the Embassy of Mexico in France and substitutes for Carlos de Icaza González.

=== International support ===
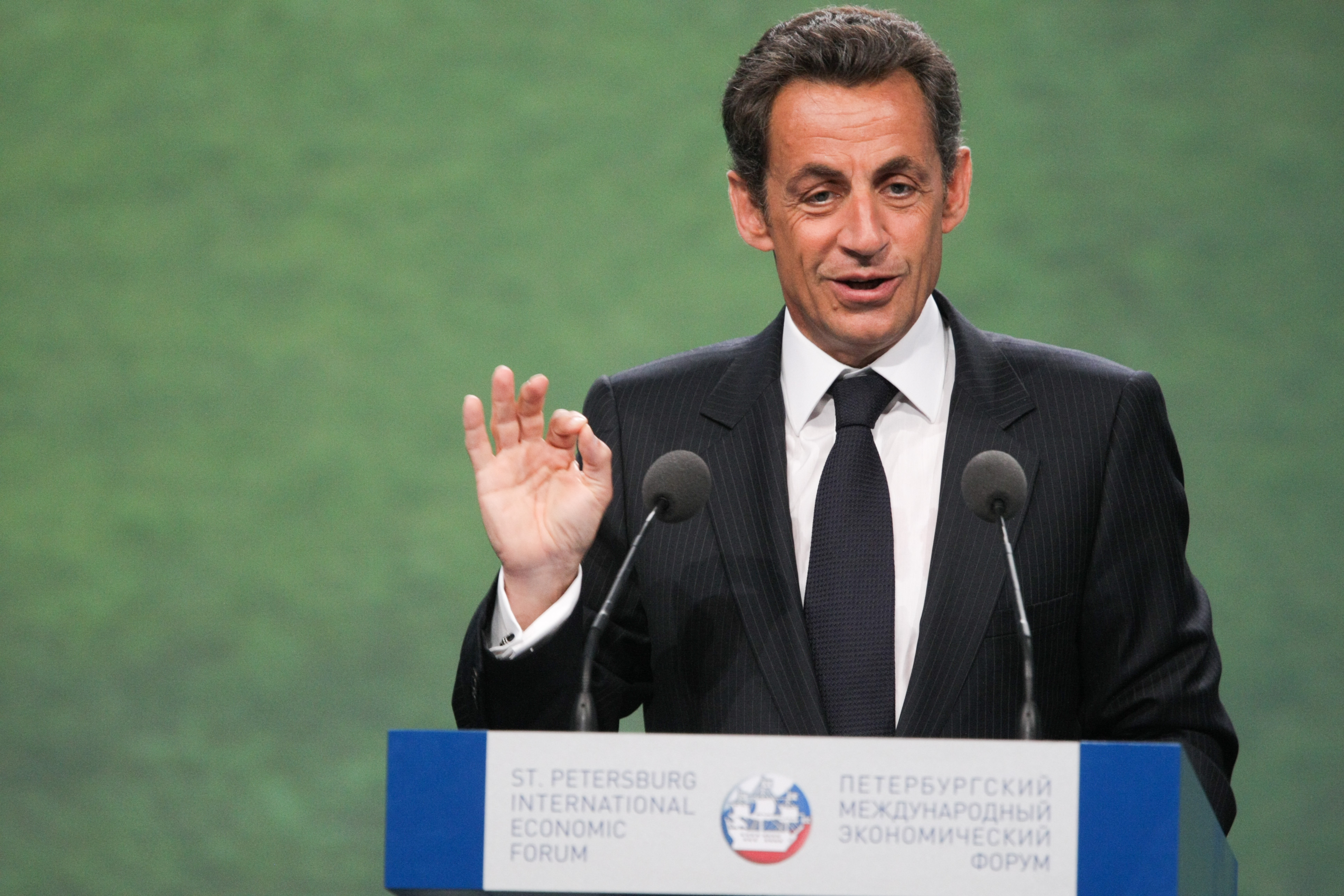
France's President Nicolas Sarkozy in a press conference

Given the delays and the perceived unwillingness of Mexican law enforcement to investigate the case, the Cázares have sought help abroad. Barbier also reached out to Europe and wrote letters to the governments of France and Germany (the former because Rodolfo Cázares was a French citizen and the latter because he was a symphony conductor with legal residence there). In France, she issued a formal complaint and sent a letter to France's former President Nicolas Sarkozy. In addition, Barbier reached out to the media to talk about the kidnapping and called for the freedom of her husband and family. "He is the eighth Frenchman kidnapped in the world, but officially there are no more than seven," said Barbier in a 12 October interview with Le Parisien. France's Ministry of Foreign Affairs and International Development responded by saying they were working on the case with Mexico and that Rodolfo Cázares could count on all the consular support he needed due to his French citizenship. She also managed to convince France's President François Hollande to talk about the case with Peña Nieto during his visit to the Élysée Palace on 17 October. She also expressed her interest in involving First Lady Valérie Trierweiler. On 5 December, Barbier contacted Gérald Martin and sent a letter to Los Pinos presidential residence asking for an interview with Peña Nieto. On 11 December, the French government stated that Rodolfo Cázares was not considered a political hostage and thereby was not included in the list of Frenchmen kidnapped abroad. This came after Barbier demanded that French authorities classify her husband as a political hostage. Barbier believes French authorities were not interested in the case. They were concerned primarily with solving the case surrounding Florence Cassez, a French native who was arrested in Mexico and given a 60-year sentence for reportedly participating in a kidnapping.

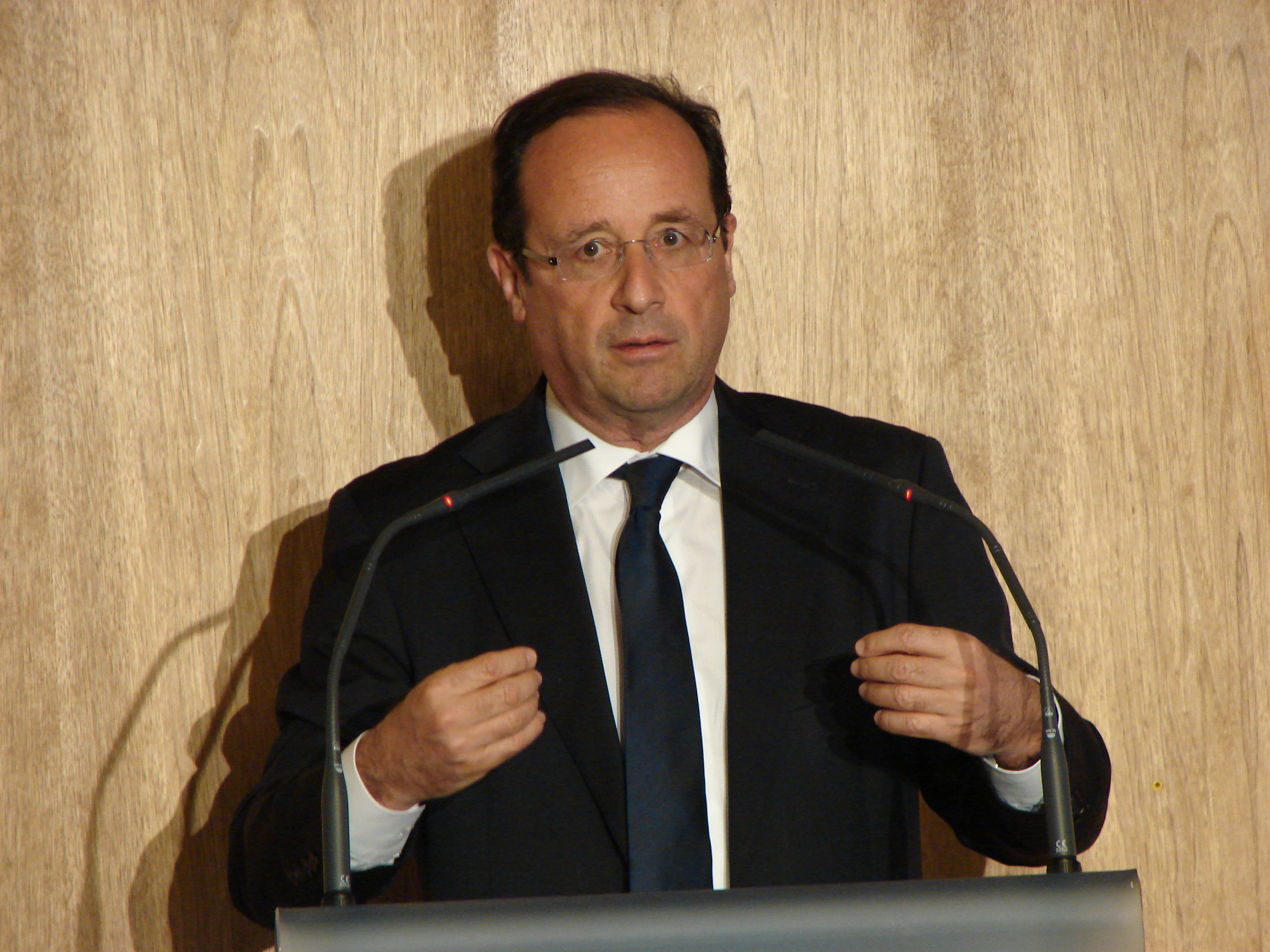
France's President Francois Hollande in a press conference

Barbier also contacted German authorities to work on the case together with them and Mexican authorities. The arts community where Barbier's husband Rodolfo Cázares worked in Bremerhaven attempted to create a fundraiser for the family to help pay his ransom to the kidnappers. Ingeborg Fischer-Thein, chairman of the International Association of Wagner Societies, where Rodolfo was a member, sent a letter to Germany's and the International Music Council saying the community was looking for ways to help in the case. Fundraisers were carried out at music events and at the apartment complex where Rodolfo and Barbier lived in Bremerhaven. The city's mayor Melf Grantz, along with local leader Artur Beneken, showed their interest in the case and contacted the Embassy of Mexico in Berlin on 6 December 2011. The Cázares also contacted the German Foreign Affairs Minister and with Bernd Neumann, who was the representative of the Federal Government for Culture; with the Embassy of Mexico in Berlin and with more municipal authorities in Bremerhaven. The Media and Public Relations Department of the Embassy of Germany in Mexico City stated that they were saddened by the kidnapping, but the case was out of their jurisdiction because Rodolfo was not a German citizen.

The family also tried to reach out to the United States and involve it in the case too. Though the five men that are disappeared hold only Mexican citizenship, three of the abductees hold U.S. citizenship and others are legal residents of the U.S. The family wants to the U.S. to investigate the case because they believe the Gulf Cartel fears the involvement of U.S. authorities. (Note: According to the Cázares, a 9-year-old boy who was kidnapped from the first home was dropped off one of the international bridges in Matamoros after the kidnappers found out that he was a U.S. citizen and that his mother had contacted the FBI.) The family also sent letters to U.S. President Barack Obama and to Pope Benedict XVI, and asked the latter to speak about the case with President Calderón during his visit to Mexico in March 2012. Barbier also sent letters to Catholic cardinals in the archdioceses of New York, Berlin, Paris, and Munich and Freising, asking them to pray for her family members that were missing. They received the same petition letters the family sent to President Calderón in their respective languages.

== Possible motives and investigation ==
Logo of Mexico's Office of the General Prosecutor (PGR), which heads the case

The motive for the kidnapping is officially unknown, but several lines of inquiry suggest a number of reasons behind the mass abduction. One version is the family was kidnapped because one of the Cázares' grandfathers had a mistress whose sons were involved with Los Zetas, a rival criminal group of the Gulf Cartel. According to Barbier, her husband's grandfather had an illegitimate son known as Rodolfo Cázares (alias "Rudy" and/or "El Rudy"). She believes Rudy was involved with Los Zetas. Barbier stated that during the abduction the kidnappers asked them several times for "El Rudy". However, she said her family did not have any contact or relationship with Rudy's family branch. Barbier stated that the kidnappers soon recognized their mistake and released her and some of her family members. In Barbier's opinion, the Gulf Cartel easily confused the Cázares men with the real target because some of them are also named "Rodolfo". Mexican investigators believe the Gulf Cartel kidnapped the Cázares family to get hold of Rudy. He was a former member of the Gulf Cartel but had left the group to join Los Zetas. In April 2012, however, he was arrested with four other people in Olmito, Texas, for aggravated robbery and organized crime charges. The police said he was a local recruiter and drug operator for Los Zetas.

Another line of investigation alleges the Cázares family was kidnapped because the Gulf Cartel was looking for Francisco Ricardo Cázares (alias "El Paco"), a drug operator from San Benito, Texas, and the alleged son of one of the victims. Police reports from Tamaulipas describe "El Paco", and a man known as Rodolfo Cázares and his sister Angie Cázares, as the main suspects in a series of grenade attacks carried out in Matamoros in 2010. Law enforcement officers identified "El Paco" as a member of Los Zetas. Federal sources allege that Rafael Cárdenas Vela (alias "El Junior"), a former high-ranking leader of the Gulf Cartel and regional boss of Matamoros, ordered the abduction of the Cázares family as a reprisal for the attacks. The grenade attacks were carried out in the Municipal City Hall, the Municipal Police Station, the Ministerial Police Station, in the Mexican Army barracks, and in a store in the downtown area. (Note: One of the grenades launched in another government building did not detonate.) At least nine civilians were injured in the attacks.

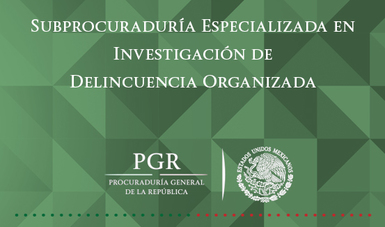
Logo of the Subprocuraduría Especializada en Investigación de Delincuencia Organizada (SEIDO) federal agency

According to federal investigator Rosario G. Sandoval Medina, former high-ranking Gulf Cartel boss Jorge Eduardo Costilla Sánchez confirmed that Cárdenas Vela had ordered the mass kidnapping. Cárdenas Vela became the regional boss of the Gulf Cartel in Matamoros in March 2011, four months before the kidnappings. He was eventually arrested in Texas in October 2011. The SEIDO federal agency, under the directorship of José Cuitláhuac Salinas Martínez, promised to obtain an agreement with U.S. law enforcement to question him about the case. The family, however, expressed their disappointment with both Mexican and U.S. authorities for failing to cooperate. In February 2013, one of the Cázares family members confirmed to the press that legal procedure to interrogate Cárdenas Vela had not born fruit. One of the family nephews stated he once saw the vehicles the kidnappers were driving (which were stolen from the Cázares) in Matamoros. He reportedly called police to let them know, but they were unable to locate the vehicle or the kidnappers.

On 28 May 2014, the Mexican Attorney General's Office (PGR) issued an official diary offering a monetary reward of MXN$1,500,000 (approximately US$101,931) to anyone who provides information leading to the five abductees: Rodolfo Cázares Garza, Manuel Alberto Cázares Garza, Héctor Cázares Garza, Rodolfo Ignacio Cázares Solís, and Rubén Luna Mendoza. Another monetary reward of the same amount was offered to anyone who can provide information that leads to the identity, location, and/or arrest of the people who planned and/or executed the kidnapping. The payment methods vary and are under the discretion of the PGR. The PGR vowed that the information provided, as well as the person(s) providing it, would be strictly reserved and anonymous. The reward information was published in several daily newspapers across northeastern Mexico that week.

== See also ==
- Mexican drug war

== Sources ==
Footnotes
