= Searcy =

Searcy may refer to:

== Places ==
- Searcy, Arkansas, a town in White County, Arkansas, United States
- Searcy Bay Conservation Park, a protected area in South Australia
- Searcy County, Arkansas, a county in north-central Arkansas, United States
- Searcy High School (Arkansas), a public high school in Searcy, Arkansas, United States
- Searcy Hospital, a psychiatric hospital in Mount Vernon, Alabama
- Searcy House (disambiguation), two structures listed on the National Register of Historic Places in Tuscaloosa County, Alabama, United States
- Searcy Municipal Airport, an airport near Searcy, Arkansas, United States

== People last name ==
- Alfred Searcy, South Australian public servant and writer
- Arthur Searcy, South Australian public servant
- Chuck Searcy, retired intelligence analyst in the United States Army
- Da'Norris Searcy, American football safety for the Tennessee Titans of the National Football League (NFL)
- Devin Searcy, American professional basketball player who currently plays for Rouen Métropole Basket of the French LNB Pro A
- Ed Searcy, retired American professional basketball player
- George Searcy, South Australian cricket Test match umpire
- Leon Searcy, American football coach and former player
- Lemuel Searcy, American politician
- Nelson Searcy, American evangelical minister and author
- Nick Searcy, American actor who currently portrays Chief Deputy United States Marshal Art Mullen on FX's Justified
- Peter Searcy, musician from Louisville, Kentucky
- R. B. Searcy, mayor of Huntsville, Alabama from 1952 to 1964
- Robert Searcy (1921–2009), a member of the Tuskegee Airmen
- Sam Searcy is a Democratic member of the North Carolina General Assembly
- Steve Searcy is a former Major League Baseball pitcher

== Searcy first names ==
- Searcy Bracewell, member of the Texas Legislature from 1947 to 1959

== Other ==
- Searcys, British catering company
- 1965 Searcy missile silo fire
