= Calca Peninsula =

Calca Peninsula South Australia
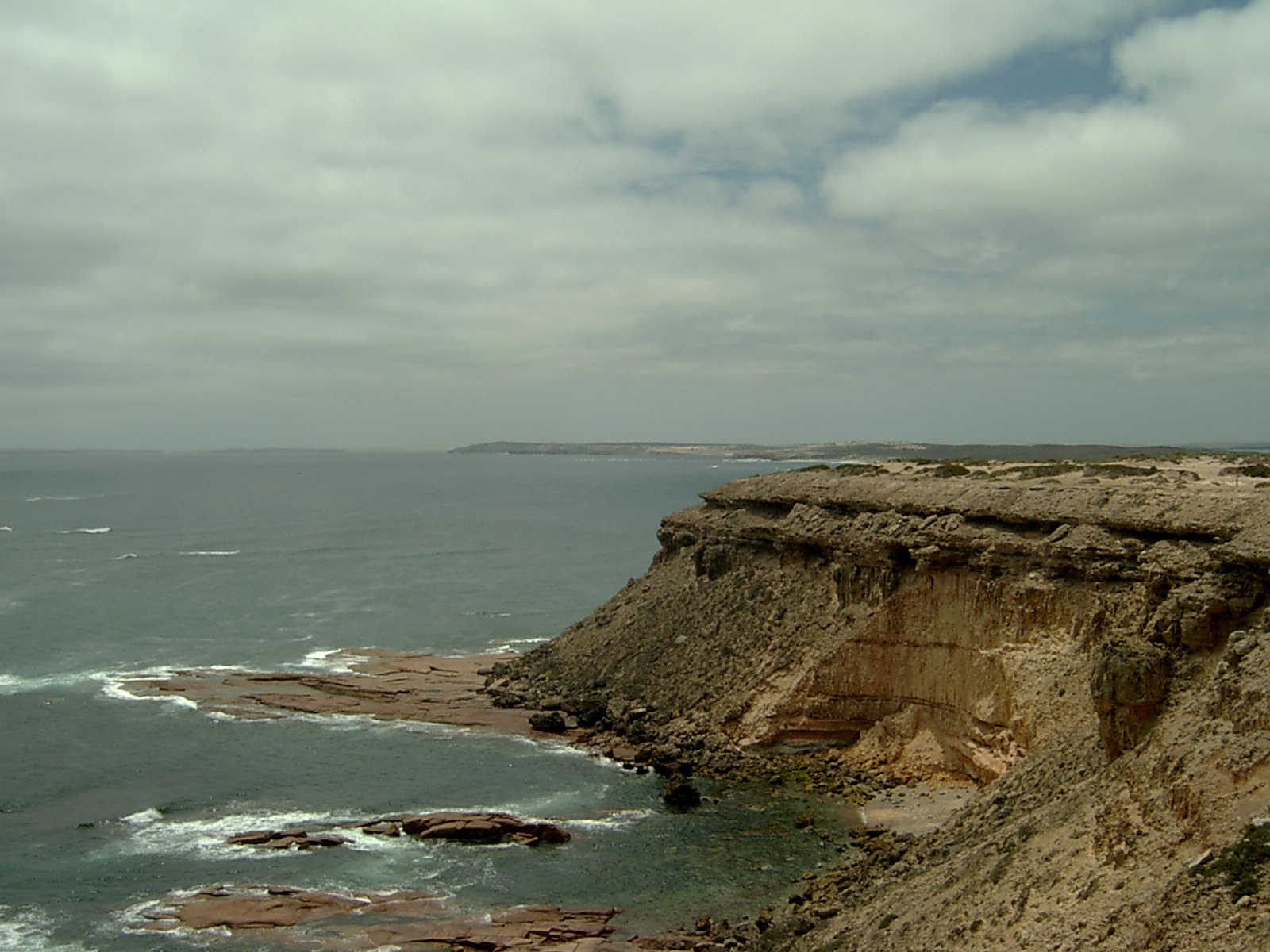
- Point Labatt, a point on the west side of the peninsula, as viewed from the south

- Coordinates: 33°07′18″S 134°27′11″E

Calca Peninsula (also known as Freeman Peninsula) is a peninsula in the Australian state of South Australia located on the west coast of Eyre Peninsula in the locality of Sceale Bay about 27 kilometres (17 miles) to about 46 kilometres (29 miles) south-east of the town of Streaky Bay.

It extends in a south easterly direction from its connection to Eyre Peninsula and is bounded by Searcy Bay and the Great Australian Bight to the west, Anxious Bay to the south east and Baird Bay to the north east. Its extremities include Point Labatt in the west and Cape Radstock in the south.

Its name is derived from a local Aboriginal word for stars while its variant name, Freeman Peninsula, is derived from the Freeman family who held land on the peninsula until 1982.

Its extent includes the following protected areas - Point Labatt Conservation Park and the southern end of the Searcy Bay Conservation Park. Since 2012, the waters adjoining its shoreline are within a habitat protection zone in the West Coast Bays Marine Park.
