= Roffe engraving families of London =

There appear to be two Roffe families of engravers in London, England in the 18th and 19th centuries.

== John and Richard Roffe ==
John Roffe (1769 London, England – 14 December 1850 Upper Holloway, Middlesex, England) was a noted architectural engraver who often worked with a Richard Roffe. It is thought that Richard was the brother of John. Their parents are not known.

John Roffe had been an apprentice to James Basire.

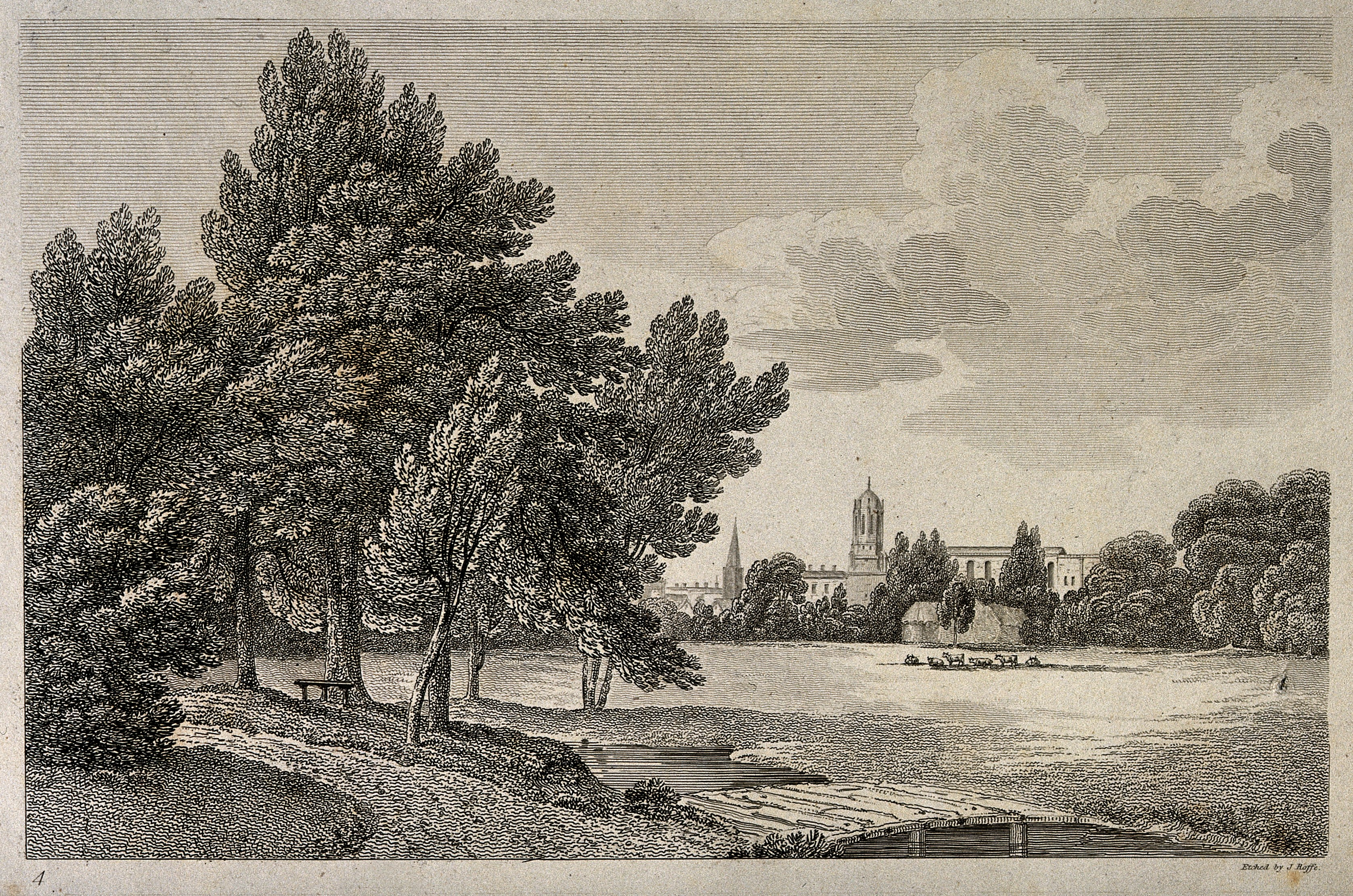
City of Oxford: a glimpse of the city from the meadows. Etching by J. Roffe.

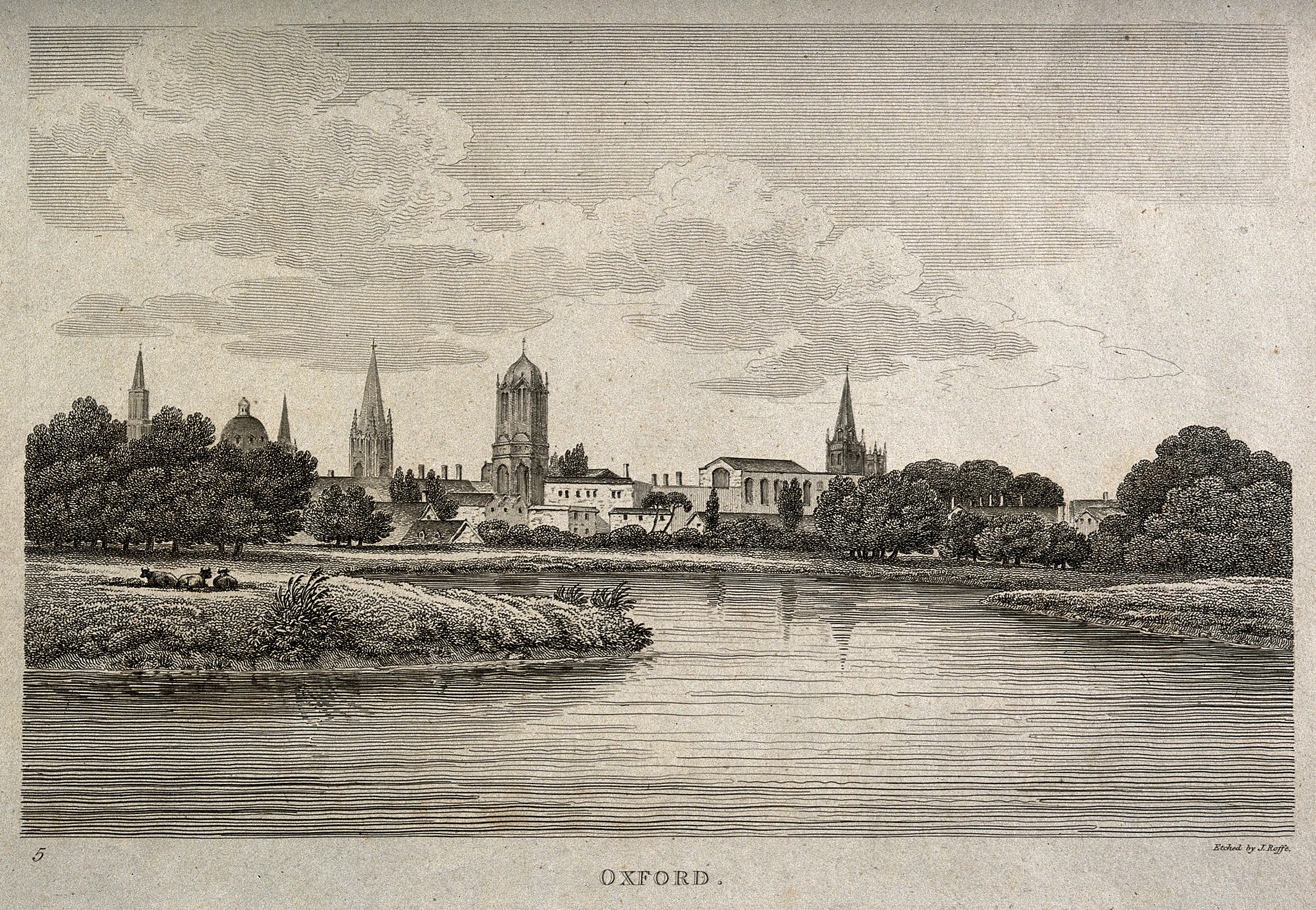
City of Oxford: view from the Cherwell. Etching by J. Roffe.

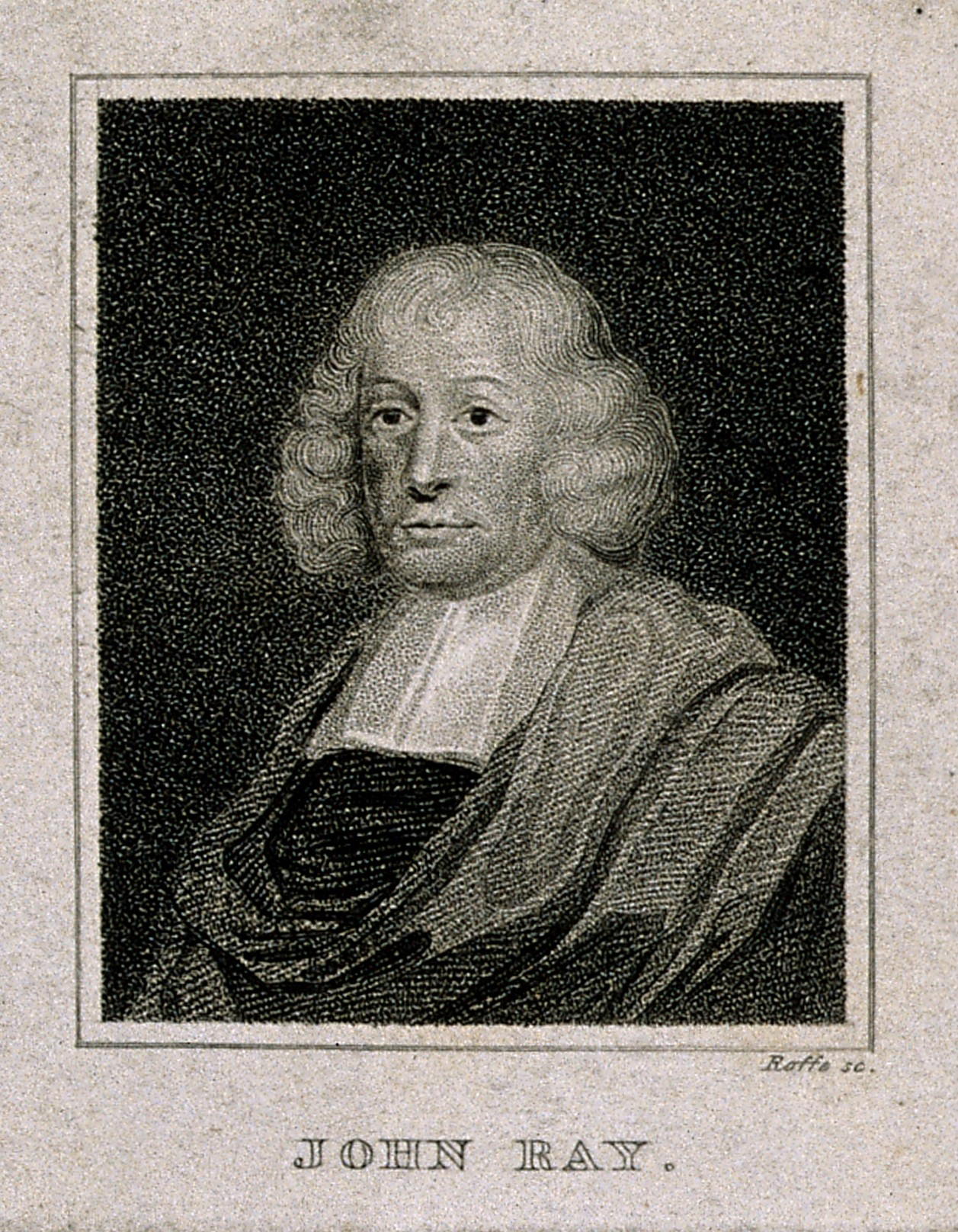
John Ray. Stipple engraving by J. Roffe, 1820, after Mary Beale.

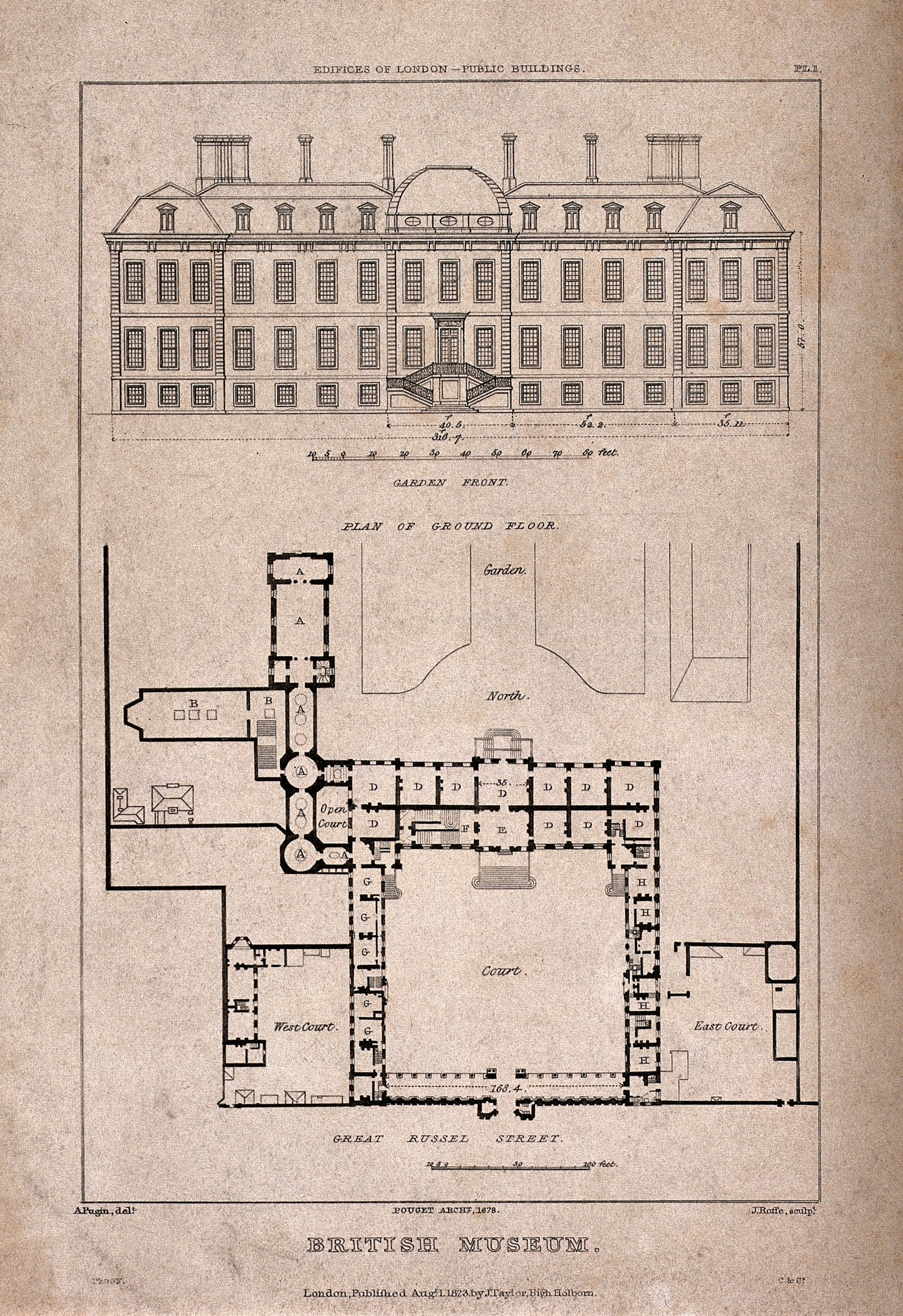
The British Museum at Montague House: a layout plan, and elevation of the garden facade. Engraving by J. Roffe after A. Pugin, 1823.

Richard Roffe (1781 – 5 March 1846 in St Pancras, Middlesex, England)

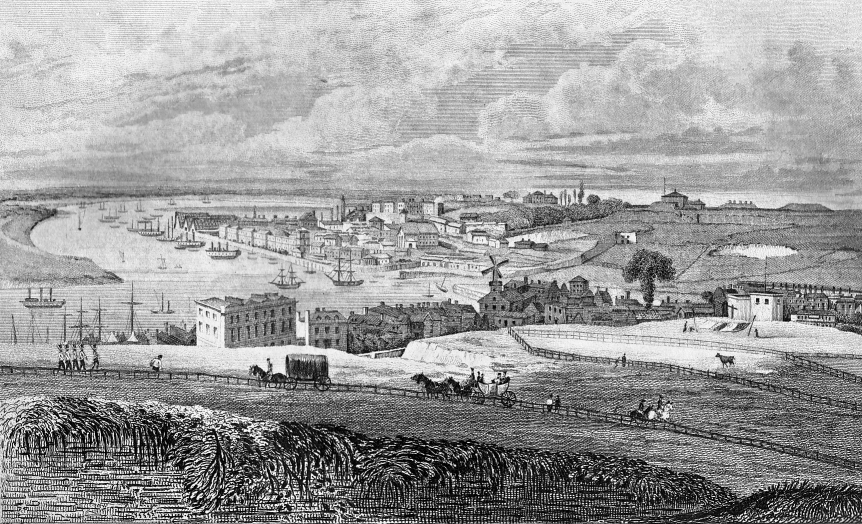
Engraving of "Chatham Dockyard from Fort Pitt" from Ireland's History of Kent, Vol. 4, 1831. It appears between pages 348 and 349. Drawn by G. Sheppard, engraved by R. Roffe.

== Robert Cabbell Roffe and children ==
Robert Cabbell Roffe (6 April 1780 Bermondsey, London, England to 25 March 1839 St Pancras, London, England) was an English engraver and diarist. He was apprenticed from 15 April 1794 – 15 Apr 1801 to Benjamin Smith, engraver.

He was the father of:

Alfred Thomas Roffe (22 Apr 1803 Somers Town, Middlesex, England – April 1871 St Pancras, Middlesex, England)

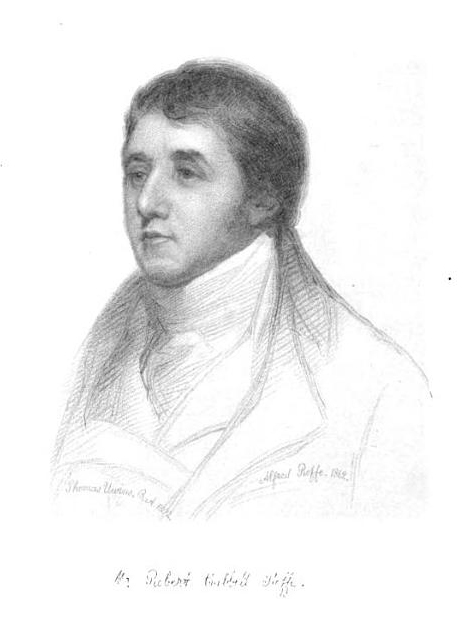
Robert Cabbell Roffe after Thomas Uwins, engraved by Alfred Thomas Roffe

Felix Robert Roffe (1814 St Pancras, Middlesex, England – 27 Jun 1887 St Pancras, Middlesex, England)

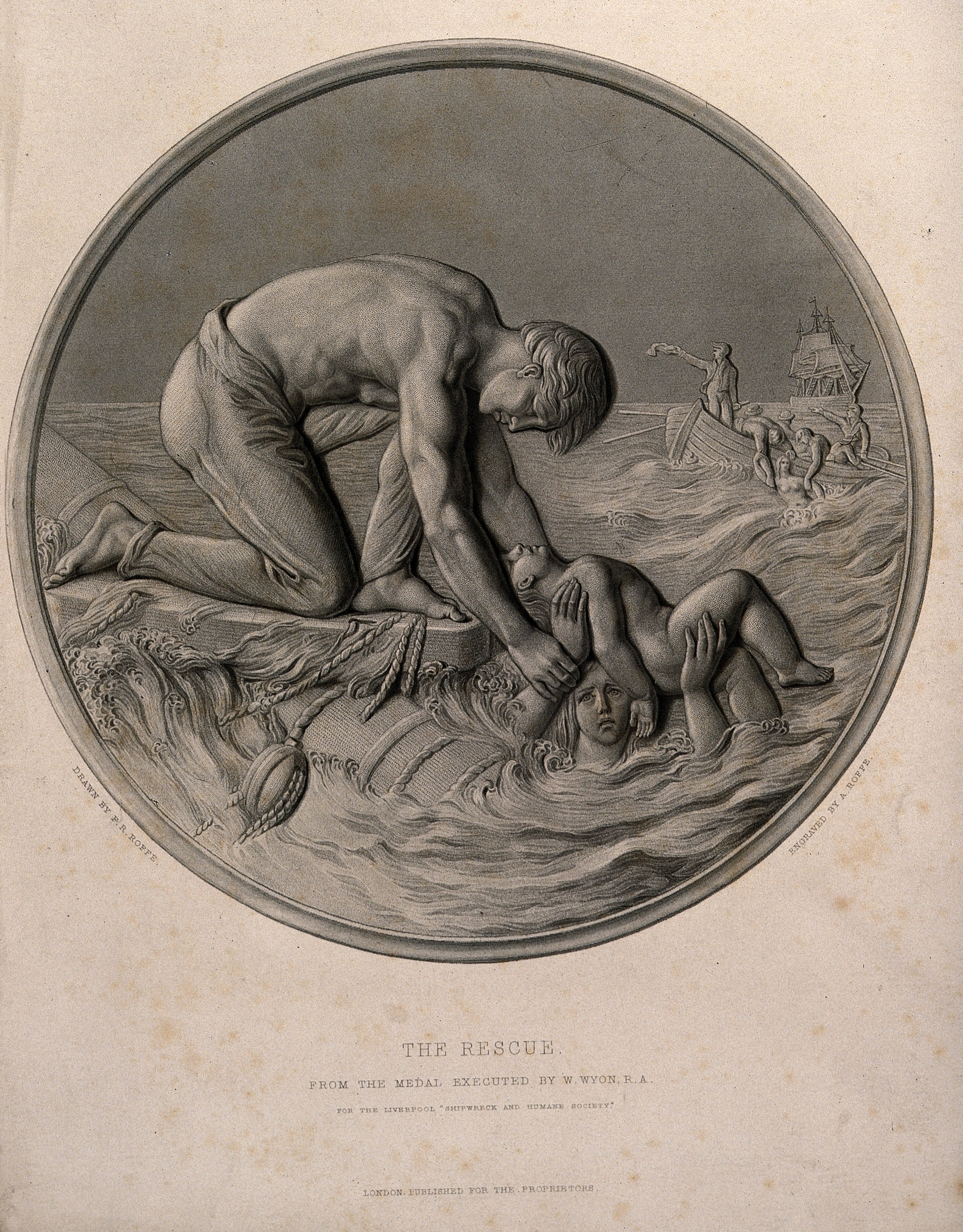
A child being rescued from a shipwreck, two women are in the sea about to be rescued by a boat. Stipple engraving by A. Roffe after F.R. Roffe after W. Wyon

Edwin Roffe (19 Sep 1825 Somers Town, St Pancras, London, England – 1891 Islington, London, England)

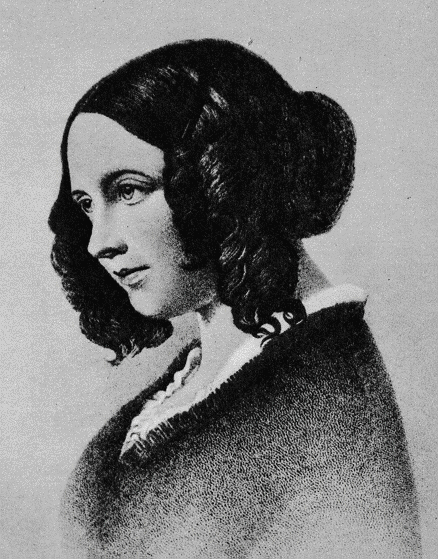
Catherine 'Kate' Thomson Dickens (née Hogarth) (1815 –1879, the wife of English novelist Charles Dickens. Stipple engraving by Edwin Roffe, after Daniel Maclise, and after John Jabez Edwin Mayall, published 1890

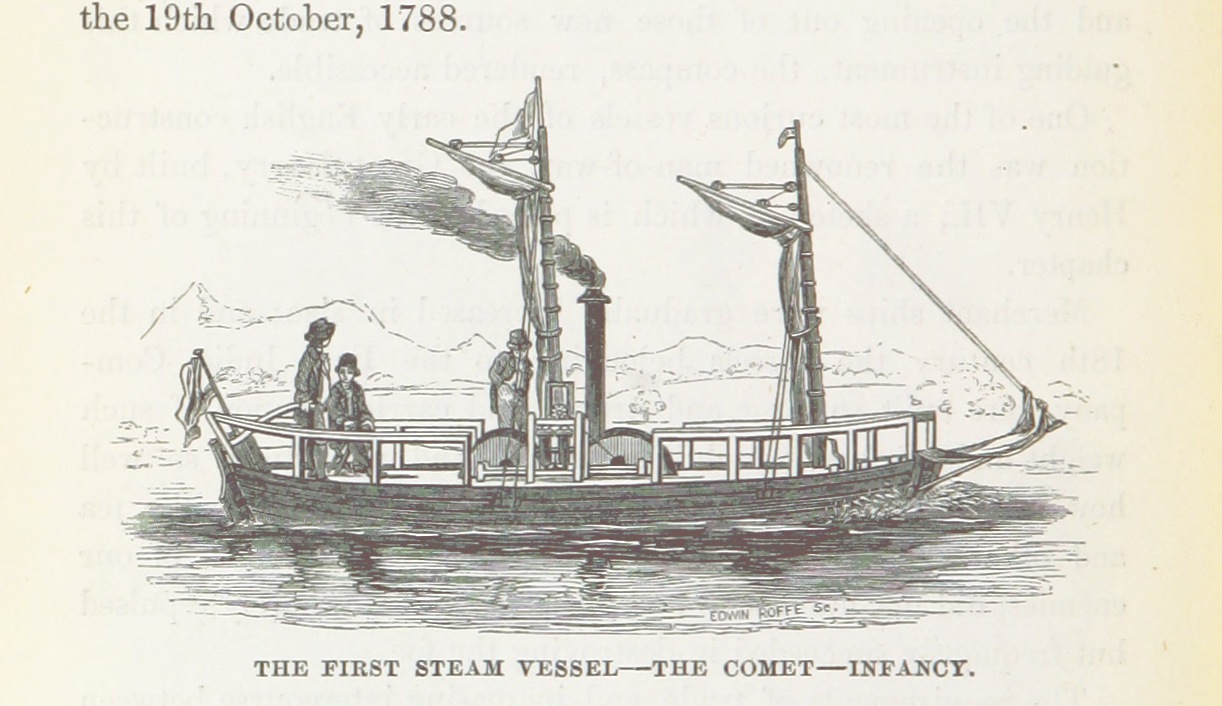
from William Stones, My first voyage. A book for youth. Illustrated by E. Roffe

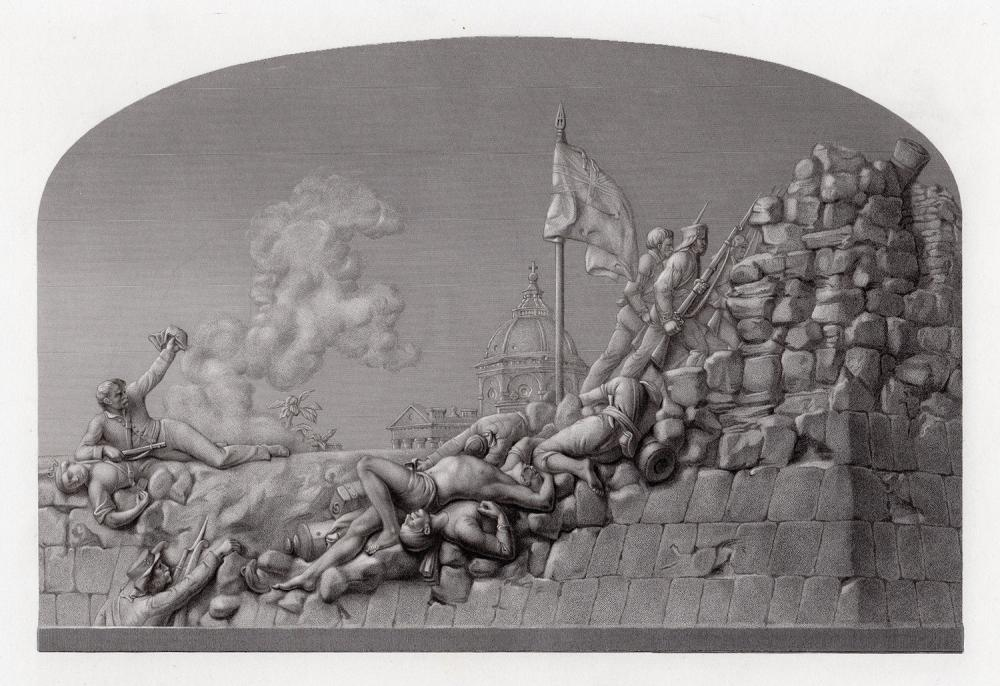
Engraving titled The Cashmere Bastion, Delhi, Sept 14 1857 (1865) from Art Journal, London. Engraved by E Roffe from the Bas-Relief by J. H. Foley."

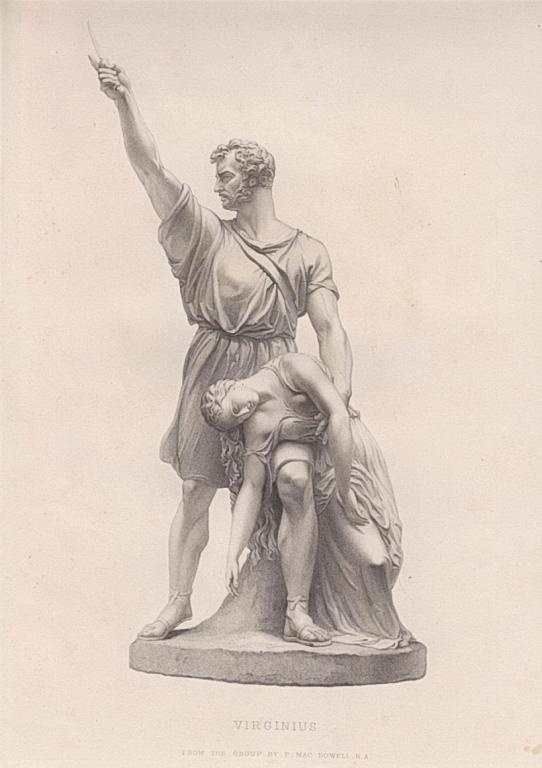
Steel engraving, engraved by Edwin Roffe after Felix Robert Roffe based on sculpture by Patrick MacDowell, 1851

He was also the father of Charlotte Edwin Searcy née Roffe, who with William Searcy were the parents of Alfred Searcy and Arthur Searcy, South Australian public servants.
