= Point Labatt Conservation Park =

Protected area in South Australia

- IUCN category III (natural monument or feature)
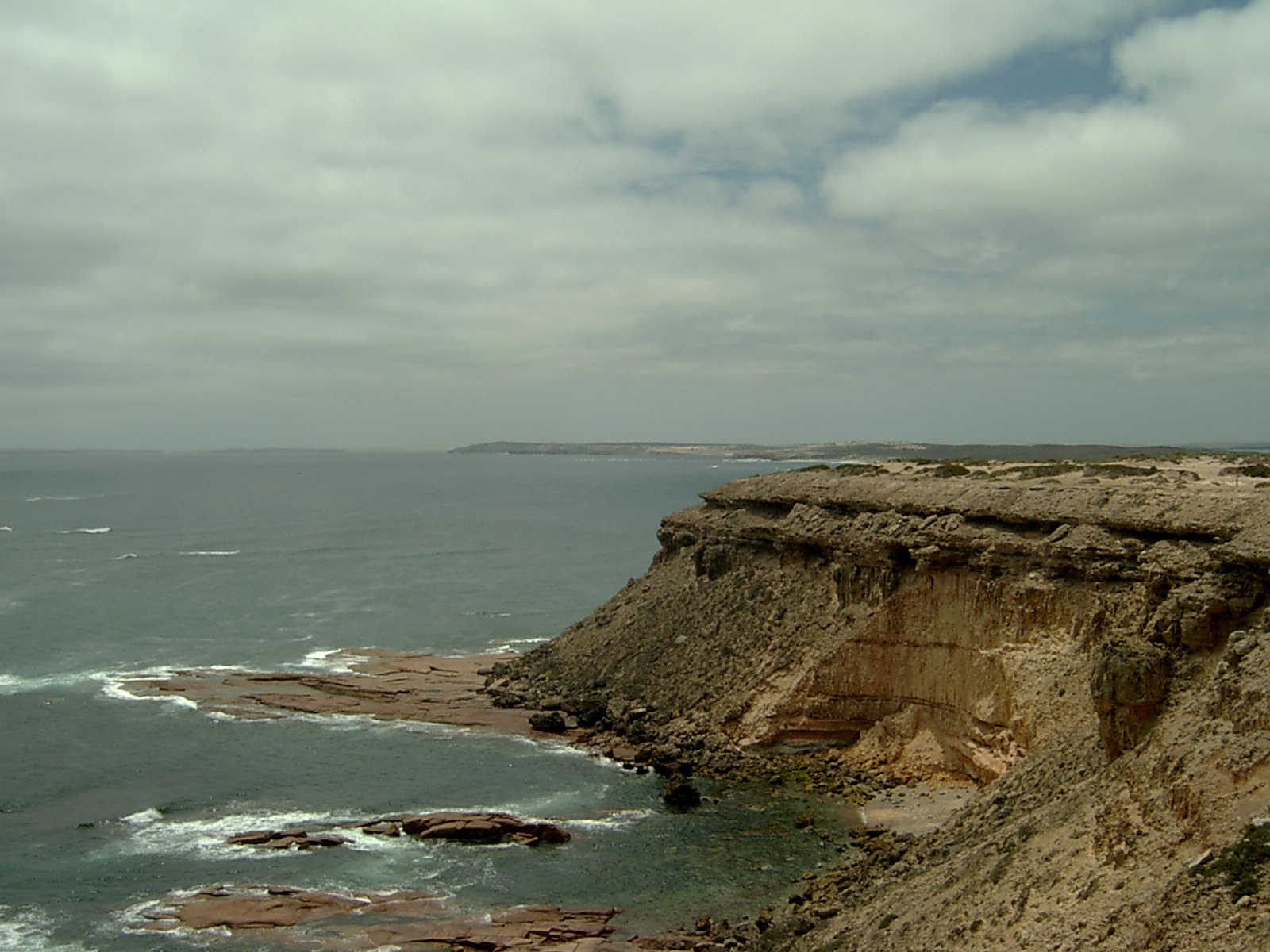
- Point Labatt as viewed from the east

- Location within South Australia
- Location: South Australia
- Nearest city: Streaky Bay
- Coordinates: 33°9′4″S 134°15′47″E
- Area: 51 ha (130 acres)
- Established: 12 July 1973
- Visitors: 10000 (in 1988-89)
- Governing body: Department for Environment and Water
- Website: Official website

Point Labatt Conservation Park is a protected area occupying Point Labatt on the west coast of Eyre Peninsula in South Australia about 39 kilometres (24 miles) South by east of Streaky Bay. The conservation park was proclaimed in July 1973 under the National Parks and Wildlife Act 1972 for the purpose of protecting what is considered to be ‘the largest colony of Australian sea lions on mainland Australia’. The conservation park was formed on land donated in 1972 by Ron, Myra and Ellen Freeman who were concerned that ‘illegal shooting was threatening these once endangered animals.’ The Point Labatt Aquatic Reserve, an associated protected area, was proclaimed in October 1988 under the Fisheries Act 1982 for the purpose of protecting an area of adjoining ocean used by the colony as a feeding ground. The conservation park is classified as an IUCN Category III protected area.
