= SS Ellengowan =

Schooner shipwrecked in Darwin, Australia

Coordinates: 12.32°S 130.52°E

History
- Name: Nøkken (1866–74); Ellengowan (1874–88)
- Namesake: the water spirit Neck
- Owner: D Hegermann (1866–74); London Missionary Society (1874–81); Palmerston Plantation Co (1881)
- Port of registry: Norway (1866–74); United Kingdom (1874–88)
- Builder: Akers Mekaniske Verksted, Christiana
- Launched: 1866
- Fate: Sank 1881, refloated 1885, later sank 1888

General characteristics
- Tonnage: 58 GRT
- Length: 79 ft (24.08 m)
- Beam: 15 ft (4.57 m)
- Depth: 8 ft 2 in (2.49 m)
- Installed power: Direct-acting steam engine
- Propulsion: Sail, single screw

SS Ellengowan was a schooner-rigged, single-screw steamer built by Akers Mekaniske Verksted in Christiania (Oslo) Norway, under her original name, Nøkken. The vessel was powered by sail and a vertical direct-acting steam engine. Ellengowan sank at its moorings, unmanned, during the night of 27 April 1888 in Port Darwin and was abandoned. 103 years later, in 1991, she was discovered by divers, making it the oldest known shipwreck in Darwin Harbour.

== Early history ==
Built in 1866 by Akers Mekaniske Verksted in Christiania in Norway, Ellengowan was originally named Nøkken. She was built for Mr D. Hegermann. The vessel was 79 feet (24 m) long, 15 feet (4.6 m) wide, had a depth of 8 feet (2.4 m) and had a gross register tonnage of 58. She was powered by sail and a vertical direct-acting steam engine. Steam was supplied by a round Scotch boiler.

Hegermann used Nøkken as a private yacht until it was sold to the London Missionary Society (LMS) in 1874. The Reverend Samuel Macfarlane persuaded Miss Baxter, of Dundee, to donate £3,000 for the steamer, renaming it after her own home "Ellengowan". Macfarlane wanted Ellengowan for missionary work in New Guinea. Departing from Somerset, Cape York Peninsula, the work began with a trip to Anuapata (Port Moresby) in November 1874, to establish the first mission in New Guinea. W. G. Lawes, a missionary with LMS, his wife and the Reverend A.W. Murray travelled on this first trip. Lawes later became the first European missionary to take up residence in Port Morseby.

Macfarlane then organised an expedition to find the mainstream of the Fly River, a major waterway in Western Province, Papua New Guinea, to determine if suitable land was available up-river to establish further missions. Ellengowan steamed for about 103 kilometres (64 mi) up a river, but it was not the Fly. Macfarlane named this river the Baxter River (also called Mai-Kassa River), after Miss Baxter. Upon the vessel's return to Somerset, Macfarlane granted leave to James Runcie, captain of Ellengowan, to take Lawrence Hargrave, an Australian inventor and explorer, Octavius Stone and Kendal Broadbent, both naturalists, in another (unsuccessful) attempt to find the mainstream of the Fly River and to cross the Owen Stanley Mountains. A third expedition to find the Fly River was again mounted by Macfarlane on 3 December 1875. He was accompanied by Luigi M D'Albertis, an Italian naturalist and the police magistrate in Somerset, Lieutenant Cherster. On this occasion, the expedition was successful. Ellengowan steamed upstream for 150 miles (240 km), establishing that the Fly was a large and navigable river. As a result, Ellengowan was the first European vessel to sail up the Fly and Baxter rivers. The furthest-most point on the Fly River that the expedition reached, on 14 December 1875, was named Ellengowan Island (7°49'13.66"S, 141°40'59.68"E) after the vessel.

== Ellengowan in the Northern Territory ==
The vessel was purchased from LMS in 1881 by the Palmerston Plantation Company, managed by Mr W. Owston, to undertake supply voyages from Palmerston (Darwin) to the Daly River where a sugar plantation had been established. While operating in this role, she struck a sandbar on the Daly River and sank.

Ellengowan remained a shipwreck for four years until she was eventually raised in 1885 by Charles Stuart Copeland, who intended to use the vessel to supply camps along the Roper and McArthur Rivers. The vessel's first trip since being raised was a charter from the government to take a customs officer, Alfred Searcy, in search of Macassan perahu along the Northern Territory coast. However, Ellengowan was so poorly repaired after its stay at the bottom of the Daly River, that upon its return to Port Darwin she was pronounced unseaworthy.

Copeland had mortgaged Ellengowan to Herbert H. Adcock and Richard De la Poer Beresford, who then used her as a quarantine hulk for Chinese passengers from Hong Kong to make up the 21 days port before being allowed to land. Being in such poor condition, Ellengowan sank at its mooring off Channel Island, unmanned, during the night of 27 April 1888 and was abandoned.

== Discovery ==
The Ellengowan shipwreck was discovered in 1991 by local scuba divers following the assistance of historical research conducted by Margaret Clinch. The shipwreck's discovery and identity was later verified by archaeologists from the Museum and Art Gallery of the Northern Territory in 1994, making it the oldest known shipwreck in Darwin Harbour and the only known Norwegian built iron steamer in Australian waters. The shipwreck lies at a depth of approximately 14 metres (46 ft), in the channel between Wickham Point and Channel Island, in Darwin Harbour's middle arm. The wreck is the largest feature to appear on a depth sounder in the area, standing about 3 metres off the harbour floor. Her exact location is given at: 12°32'28"S, 130°52'08"E. Ellengowan is a protected shipwreck under the Northern Territory Conservation Act 1991. Visitors to the site are required not to disturb the site in any way, in an effort to preserve the remaining structure and artefacts for the enjoyment of future generations of site visitors.

== Legacy ==
- A second Ellengowan, also funded by Miss Baxter, was built for the London Missionary Society in 1881 by R. & H. Green at Blackwall. She was a 33NRT iron-hulled sailing schooner with dimensions 58 ft 5 in (17.81 m) length, 14 ft 0 in (4.27 m) beam and 7 ft 8 in (2.34 m) depth. In 1895 she was chartered by British naturalist Albert Stewart Meek to make his first collecting trip to Woodlark Island, 170 km ESE. This vessel, under Captain Whitten, also operated between Cooktown, Queensland, and Samarai, Milne Bay Province. In December 1898 the schooner was wrecked in New Guinea during a hurricane.
- Ellengowan Drive, a street in the northern Darwin suburb of Brinkin, was named after the ship.
- On the Territory of Papua and New Guinea 1:100,000 Topographic Survey maps Sheet 7282, which encompasses Ellengowan Island and the Middle Fly River, is titled ELLANGOWAN(sic), and the island is named as Ellangowan(sic) Island.
