= Point Labatt =

Point Labatt South Australia
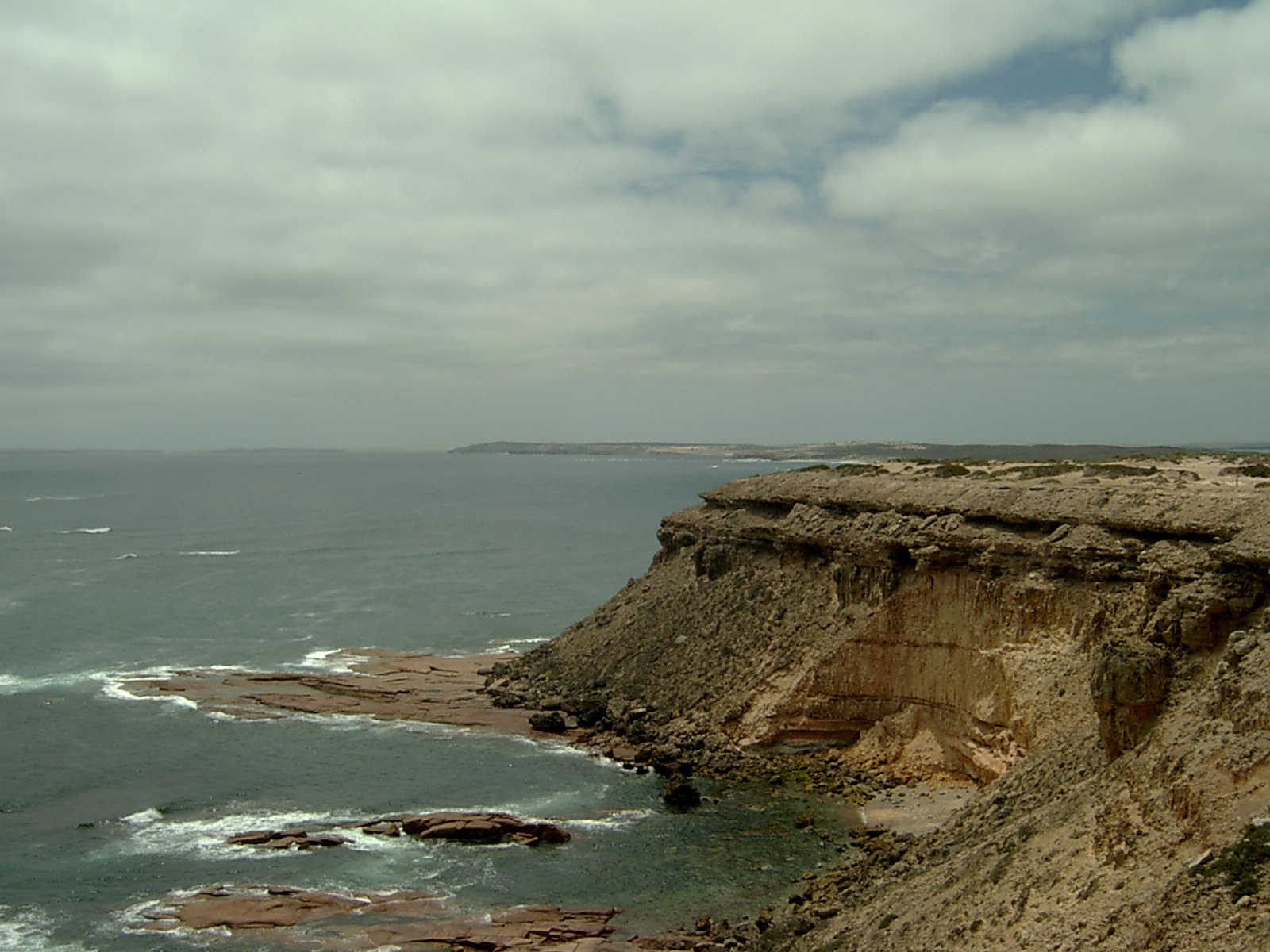
- Point Labatt as viewed from the south

- Coordinates: 33°9′9″S 134°15′39″E
- Elevation: 60 m (197 ft)

Point Labatt is a headland located on the west coast of Eyre Peninsula in the Australian state of South Australia about 39 kilometres (24 miles) south by east of Streaky Bay. It is notable as one of the largest Australian mainland breeding sites for Australian sea lions. The land and the sea adjoining Point Labatt is part of three protected areas - the Point Labatt Conservation Park, the Point Labatt Aquatic Reserve and the West Coast Bays Marine Park.

== Description ==
Point Labatt is located in the locality of Sceale Bay on the west side of the Calca Peninsula, a small peninsula on the west coast of Eyre Peninsula, at a distance of about 40 kilometres (25 miles) South by east of Streaky Bay and about 440 kilometres (270 miles) west-northwest of Adelaide. When viewed from a platform such as a ship, Point Labatt appears as the start of a line of uninterrupted cliffs starting at a height of 60 metres (200 feet) that runs in a south easterly direction and that rises to a height of 135 metres (443 feet) at Cape Radstock, the north head of Anxious Bay.

== Formation, geology and oceanography ==
Point Labatt as a headland was formed when the sea reached its present level 7,500 years ago after sea levels started to rise at the start of the Holocene.

Point Labatt and the adjoining cliff line consists of a calcarenite known as the Bridgewater formation overlying a red granite known as the Hiltaba Suite. The cliff top are finished with a soil consisting generally of a thin layer of calcareous material. The water adjoining the base of Point Labatt drops to a depth of 50 metres (160 feet) within a distance of 300 metres (980 feet) of its shore.

== Naming ==
Point Labatt was named as Labatt Point in 1908 after Mr. J. B. Labatt, the Assistant Engineer of Harbours in the South Australian Government.

== Flora and fauna ==
=== Flora ===
The flora present at Point Labatt consists of a combination of both low shrubland and low open shrubland. The low shrubland features the following plant species: Ribbed thryptomene, Coastal Daisybush, Melaleuca lanceolata, Triodia irritans and Lepidosperma concavum. The low open shrubland features the following plant species: Melaleuca halmaturorum, Calocephalus brownii, Maireana oppositifolia, Grey Saltbush and Nitre Bush.

=== Fauna ===
The coastline immediately adjoining the point supports a colony of Australia sea lions which is notable as being one of the largest mainland breeding sites for this species in Australia. Other species of Pinniped sighted at Point Labatt include Australian fur seal and New Zealand fur seal. Other mammal species possibly include the western grey kangaroo and the euro while known to occur on the CaIca Peninsula, but have not been recorded in the vicinity of Point Labatt as of 1995. The following feral mammal species have been recorded at the locality: cats, foxes and rabbits. As of 1995, the following bird species have recorded as being present at Point Labatt: cormorants, gulls, terns, swallows, and kestrels. As of 1995, the following reptile species are recorded as being present: the shingle back lizard and a species of dragon lizard.

== History ==
=== Aboriginal use ===
As of 1995, the extent of use of Point Labatt and adjoining land by the Nauo people, the Aboriginal people who lived in the locality prior to European colonisation is not known.

=== European use ===
The land that adjoins Point Labatt was used for agricultural purposes until it was donated in 1972 by Ron, Myra and Ellen Freeman for the purpose of creating a protected area for the Australian sea lion colony. The ocean immediately adjoining the point was a popular site for snorkelling with Australian sea lions prior to 1988. Point Labatt is considered to an important tourist destination within the District Council of Streaky Bay, particularly as it and Seal Bay on Kangaroo Island are the only two places where Australian sea-lions can be easily observed in their natural habitat.

== Protected area status ==
The point is associated with three protected areas. The first is the Point Labatt Conservation Park. The second is the Point Labatt Aquatic Reserve which protects the body of water immediately the south west of the conservation park's coastal frontage. The third is the West Coast Bays Marine Park which consists of a restricted access zone immediately the point.

The point, some coastline to its immediate east and west as well as the adjoining waters with a total area of 147 hectares (360 acres) has been listed as a "wetland of national importance" in the Directory of Important Wetlands in Australia since 1996.

== Gallery ==
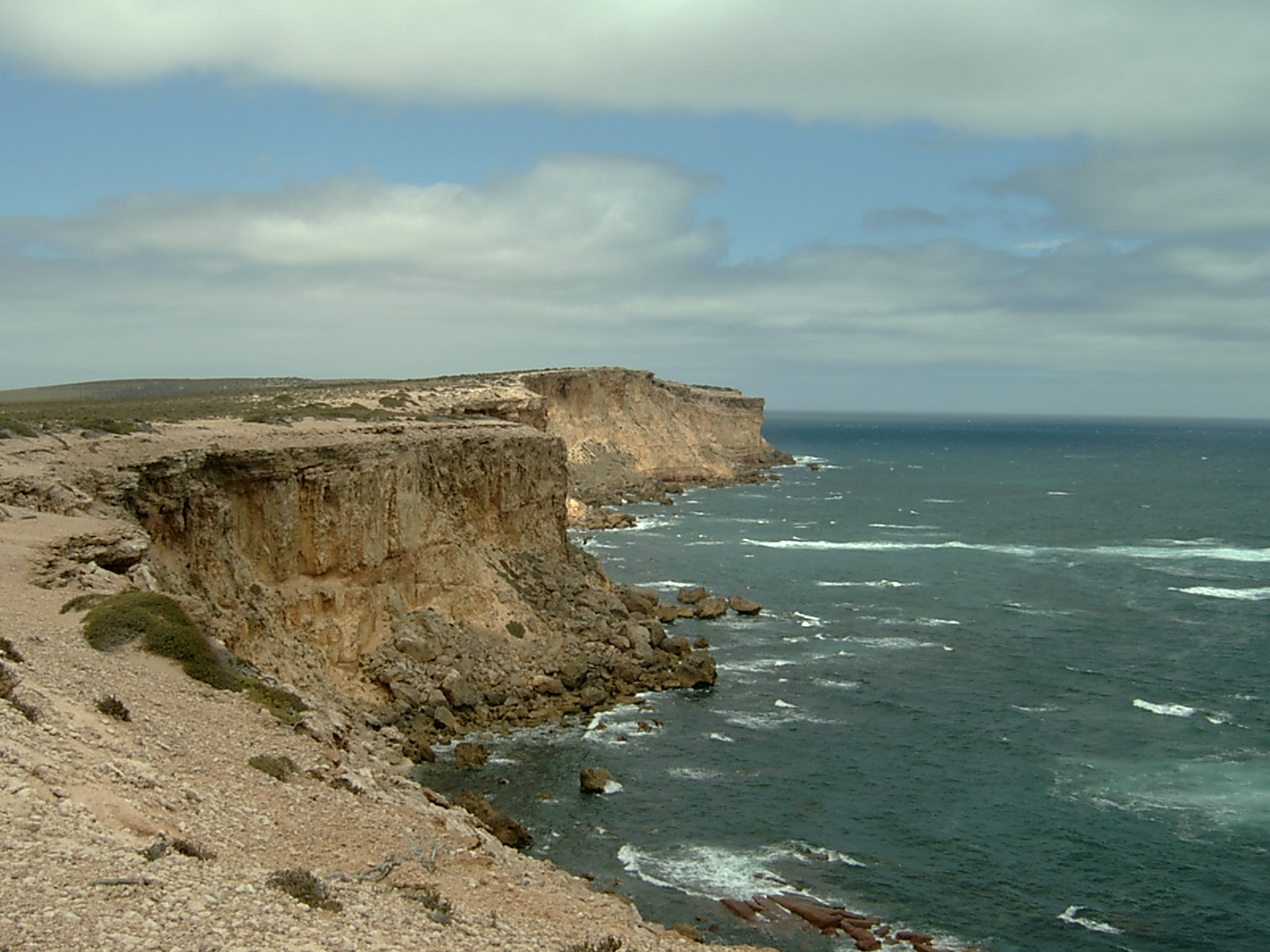
Looking east from visitors’ observation area at Point Labatt.

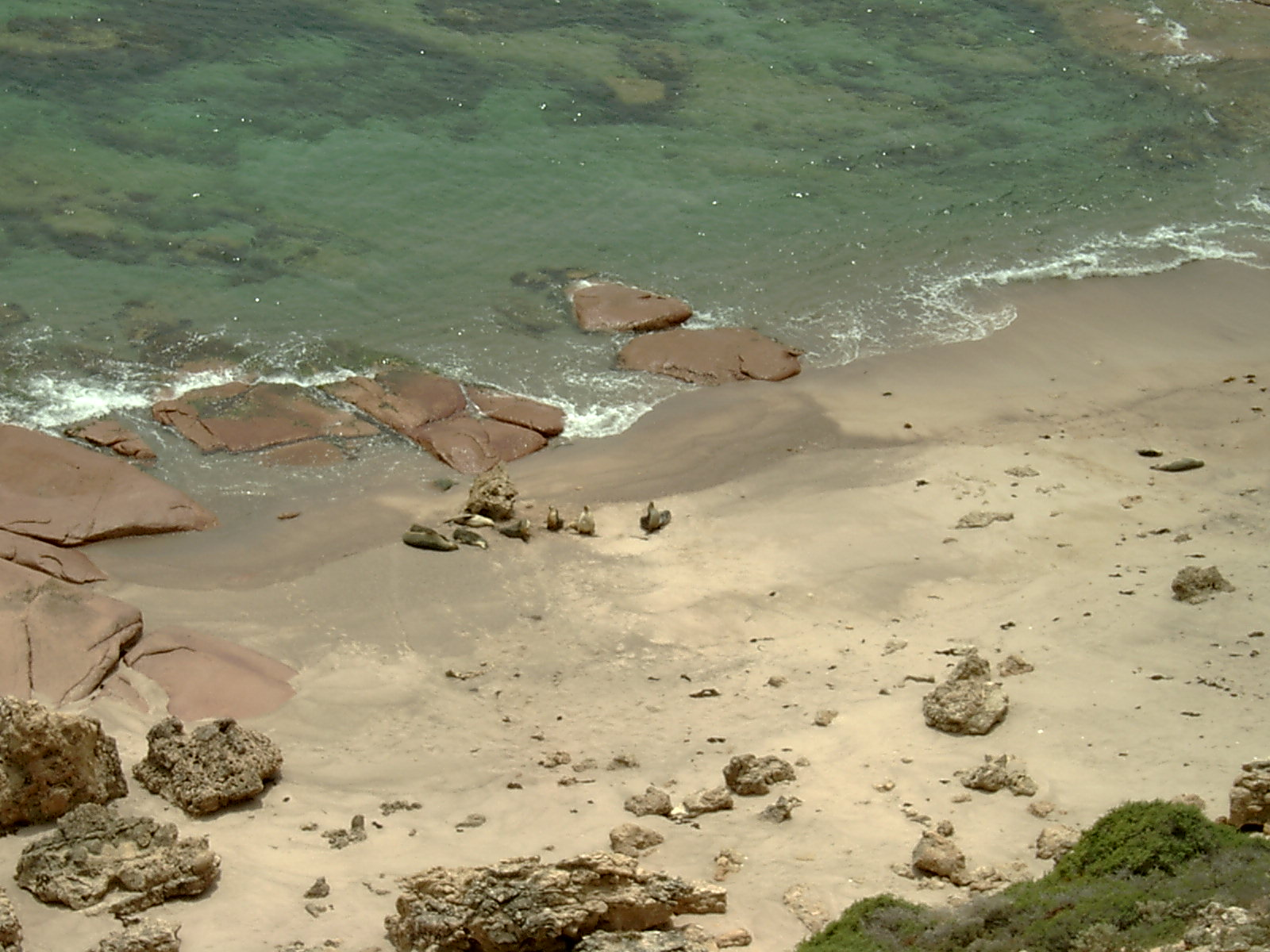
Australian sea lions on beach at Point Labatt.

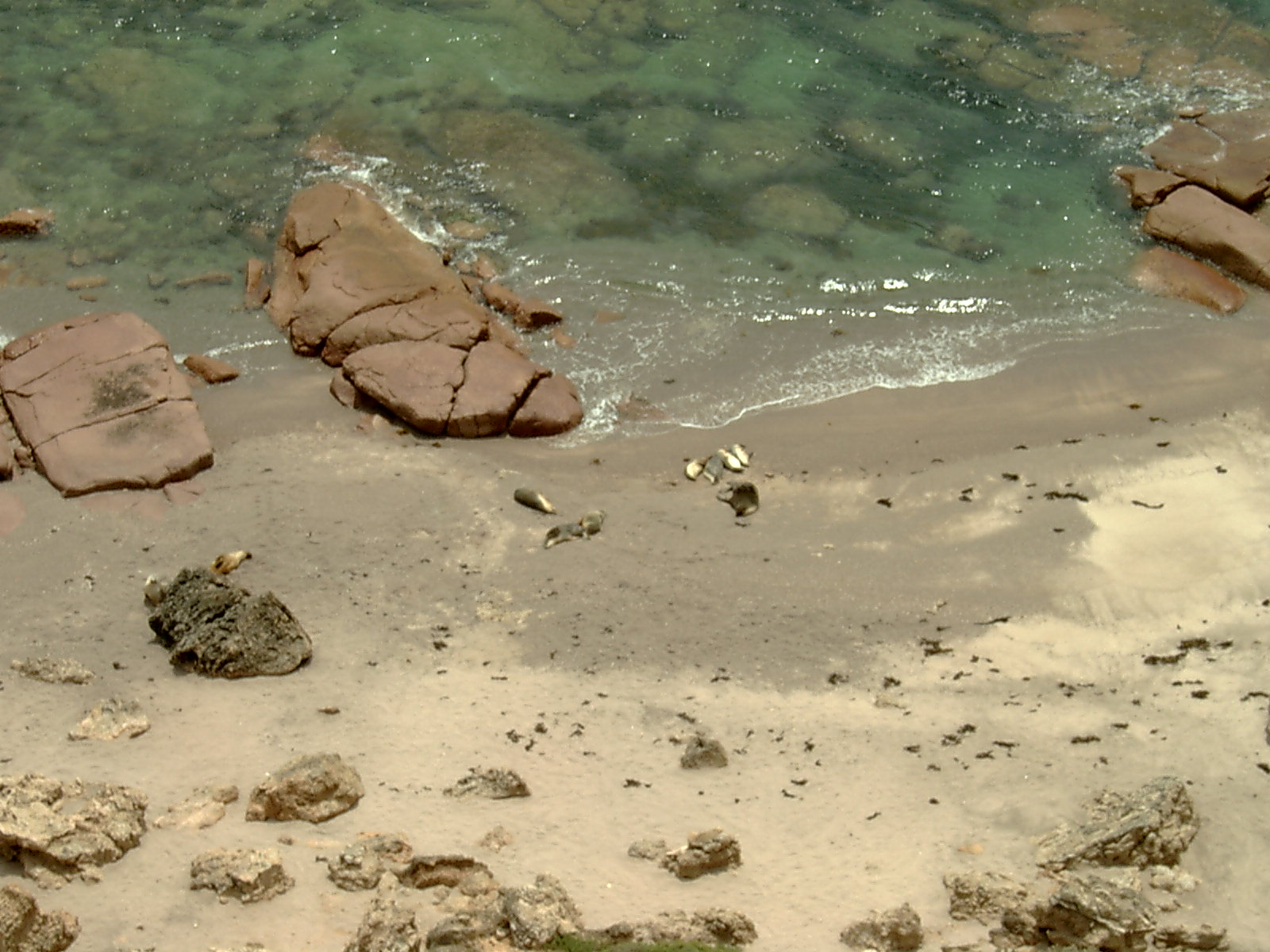
Australian sea lions on beach at Point Labatt.

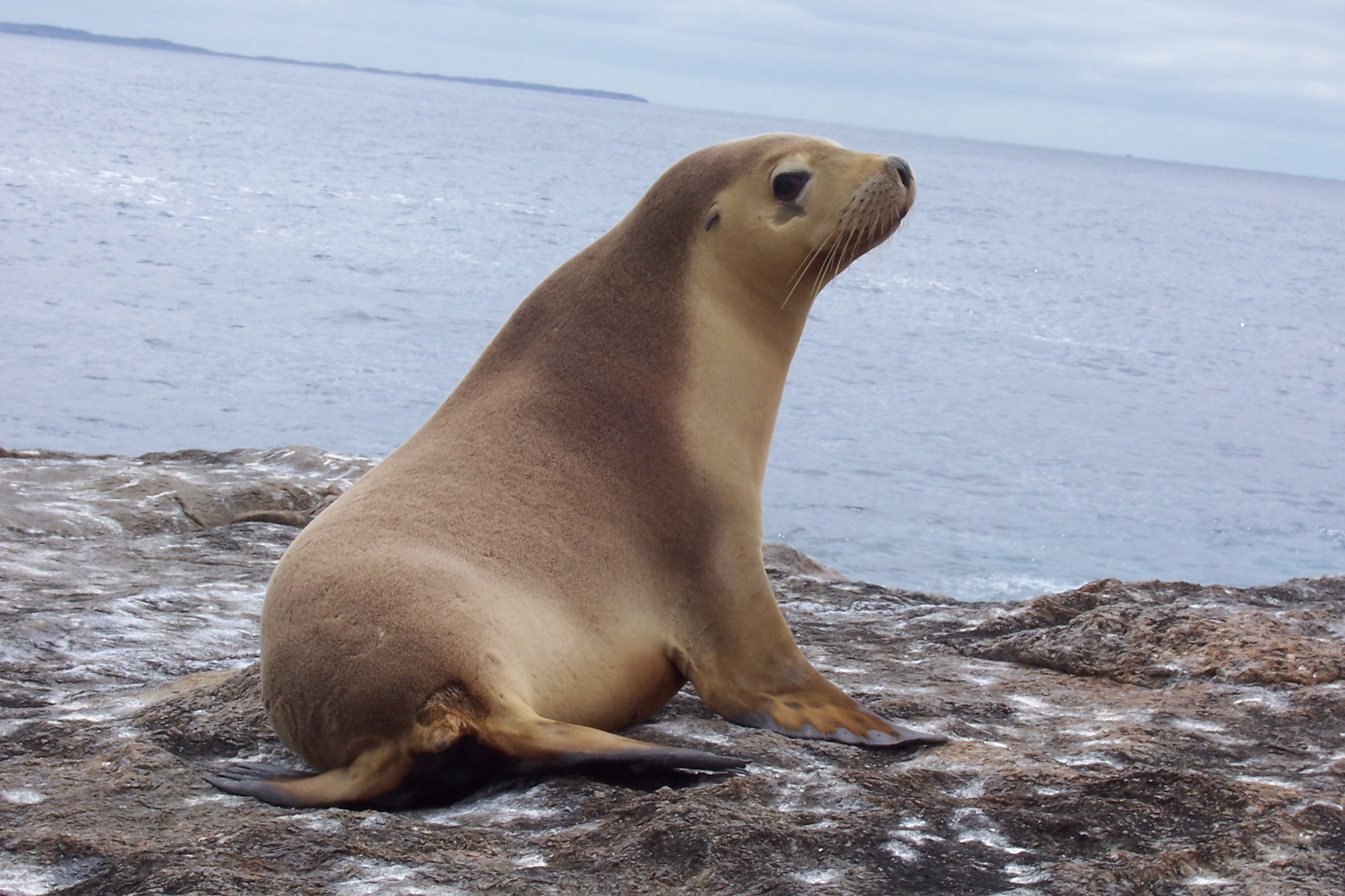
Australian Sea Lion

== Citations and references ==
=== References ===
- South Australia. Department of Environment and Natural Resources (DENR). Far West District; South Australia. National Parks and Wildlife Service (1995), Point Labatt Conservation Park management plan, Eyre Peninsula, South Australia (PDF), Dept. of Environment and Natural Resources
- South Australia. Department of Marine and Harbors (DMH) (1985), The Waters of South Australia a series of charts, sailing notes and coastal photographs, Dept. of Marine and Harbors, South Australia, ISBN 978-0-7243-7603-2
- Eyles, Kathy; Larmour, Geoff; Young, Sarah; Australia. Environment Australia; Natural Heritage Trust (Australia). National Wetlands Program (2001), A Directory of important wetlands in Australia (PDF) (3rd ed.), Environment Australia, ISBN 978-0-642-54721-7
- Primary Industries and Regions South Australia (PIRSA) (2007), Aquatic Reserve: Point Labatt (PDF), Primary Industries and Regions South Australia
- Robinson, A. C.; Armstrong, D. M., eds. (1999). A Biological Survey of Kangaroo Island, South Australia, 1989 & 1990 (PDF). Adelaide, SA: Heritage and Biodiversity Section, Department for Environment, Heritage and Aboriginal Affairs, South Australia. ISBN 0-7308-5862-6.
- "West Coast Bays Marine Park Management Plan 2012" (PDF). Department of Environment, Water and Natural Resources (DEWNR).
