= Cape Radstock =

Cape Radstock South Australia
- Coordinates: 33°11′55.3″S 134°19′43.3″E
- Elevation: 135 m (443 ft)
- Location: 45 km (28 mi) south south-east of Streaky Bay

Cape Radstock is a headland located on the west coast of Eyre Peninsula in South Australia about 45 kilometres (28 miles) south south-east of the town of Streaky Bay and about 9.3 kilometres (5 nmi) south east of Point Labatt. The cape is both the north western extremity of Anxious Bay and the southern extremity of the Calca Peninsula. The cape is described as being "steep and bold" and where the cliffs reach a height of 135 metres (443 feet), being the high point of a line of cliffs starting at Point Labatt in the west and from within Anxious Bay in the east. It was named by Matthew Flinders on 9 February 1802 after William Waldegrave, 1st Baron Radstock. Since 2012, the waters adjoining its shoreline are within a habitat protection zone in the West Coast Bays Marine Park.
