= Point Labatt Aquatic Reserve =

Protected area in South Australia

- IUCN category Ia (strict nature reserve)
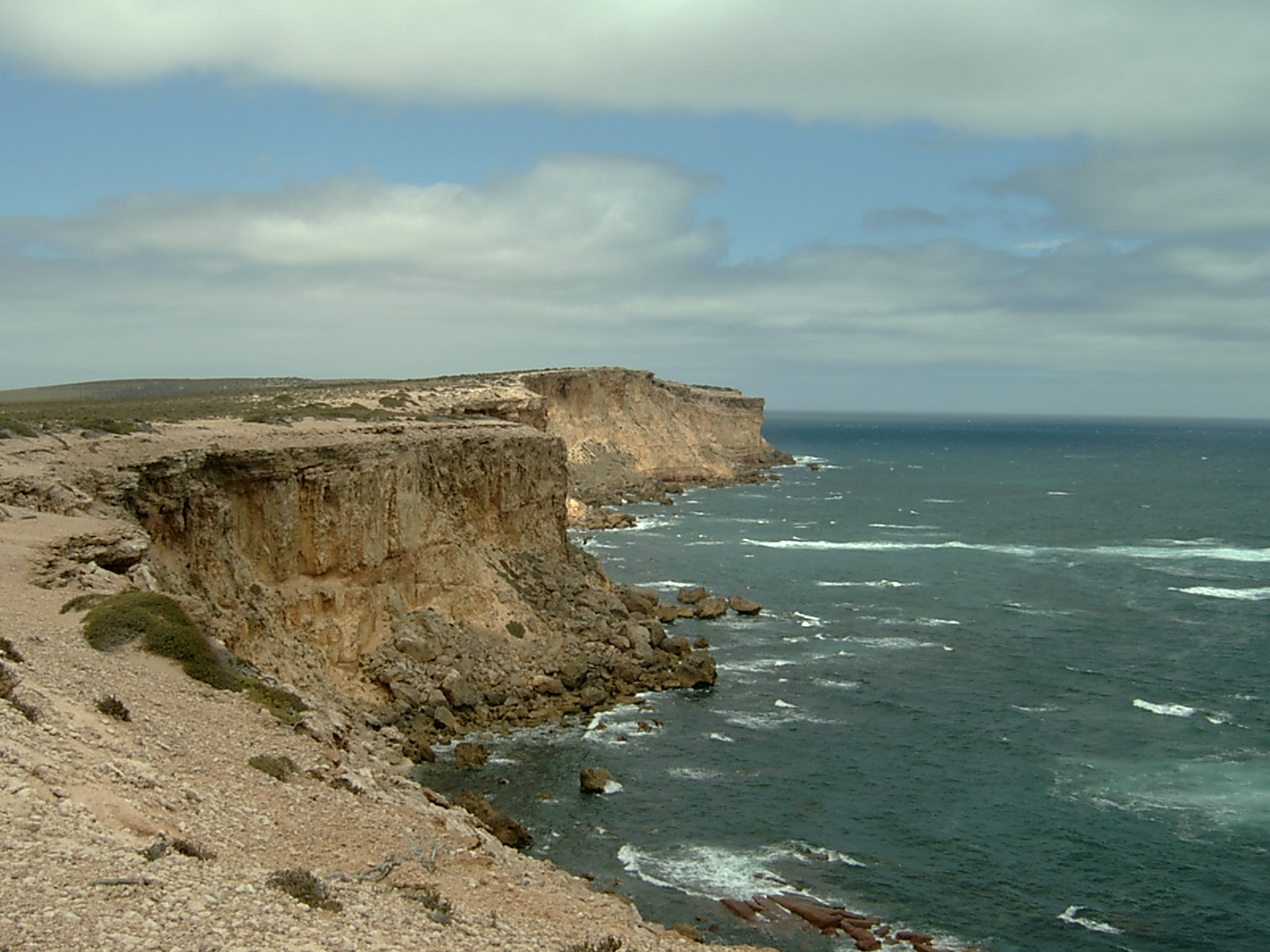
- Looking east from visitors’ observation area at Point Labatt.

- Location within South Australia
- Location: South Australia
- Nearest city: Streaky Bay.
- Coordinates: 33.1508°S 134.2532°E
- Area: 2.38 km^{2} (0.92 sq mi)
- Established: 1988
- Governing body: Primary Industries and Regions SA (PIRSA)

Point Labatt Aquatic Reserve is a marine protected area in the Australian state of South Australia located in the waters of the Great Australian Bight adjoining the west coast of Eyre Peninsula at the headland of Point Labatt.

It was proclaimed under the Fisheries Act 1982 in 1988 and was re-proclaimed in 2007 following the enactment of the Fisheries Management Act 2007. The creation of the aquatic reserve was for the purpose of protection of a breeding colony of Australian sea lion, a species protected under the Fisheries Management Act 2007 and scheduled as ‘rare’ under the National Parks and Wildlife Act 1972. This purpose is achieved via the prohibition of public access as well as any activity involving fishing or the collection and removal of marine organisms. The aquatic reserve extends a distance of 1 nautical mile (1.9 km; 1.2 mi) seaward from the coastline and covers an area of 2.38 square kilometres (0.92 square miles).

Since 2012, it has been located within the boundaries of a ‘restricted access zone’ within the West Coast Bays Marine Park.

The aquatic reserve is classified as an IUCN Category Ia protected area.

== See also ==
- Protected areas of South Australia
