= Searcy House =

Searcy House may refer to:

- George A. Searcy House, listed on the National Register of Historic Places in Tuscaloosa County, Alabama
- Dr. James T. Searcy House, listed on the National Register of Historic Places in Tuscaloosa County, Alabama
