= Chuck Searcy =

Intelligence analyst in the United States Army

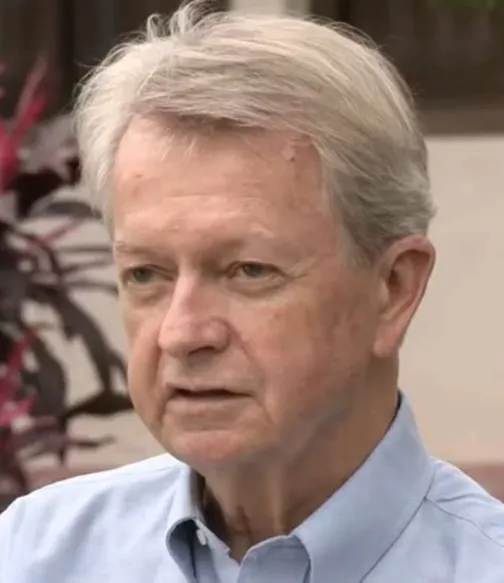
- Searcy in 2017
- Born: October 1944 (age 81); Anniston, Alabama, U.S.
- Branch: United States Army
- Service years: 1966–1969

Chuck Searcy (born October 1944) is an American former intelligence analyst in the United States Army.

== Life and career ==
Searcy was born in Anniston, Alabama, the son of Hayes and Carolyn Searcy. He was a radio announcer during the 1960s.

Searcy served in the United States Army from 1966 to 1969. After his discharge, he lingered in Germany. In 1970, he returned to Athens, Georgia and enrolled at the University of Georgia, earning his B.A. degree in political science.

Searcy was executive director of the Georgia Trial Lawyers Association for six years.

In 2001, Searcy founded Project Renew, a group that helps remove unexploded bombs in Quảng Trị province.

In 2003, Searcy was awarded the Vietnam Friendship Medal.
