= Arthur Searcy =

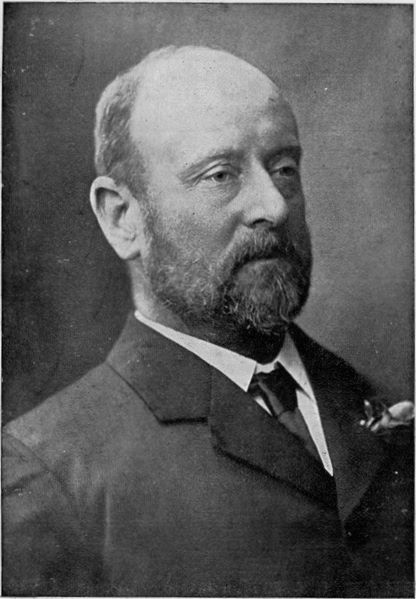
- Born: 6 January 1852; Mount Barker, South Australia, Australia
- Died: 9 December 1935 (aged 83); St Peters, South Australia, Australia
- Resting place: West Terrace Cemetery, Adelaide, South Australia, Australia
- Spouse: Emily Louisa nee Payne
- Children: Charlotte Mabel Searcy (1872–1958), Beatrice Mabel Searcy (1874–1951), Felix Hugh Searcy (1875–1947), Henrietta Gertrude Searcy (1877–1900), Blanche Eleanor Searcy (1879–1931), John Edwin (Jack), Searcy (1882–1948), Charles Arthur Searcy (1883–1964), Violet Christina Searcy (1885–1972), Emily Dora Searcy (1887–1970), Harcourt Beaumont Gilbert Searcy (1889–1969), Perroomba Rochester Basil Searcy (1890–1973), William Ferdinand Searcy (1893–1974), Donald Lester Searcy (1895–1933), Kathleen Emily Searcy (1897–1986)
- Parent(s): William Searcy and Charlotte Edwin nee Roffe
- Relatives: Alfred Searcy, brother; George Searcy, first cousin; Robert Cabbell Roffe, grandfather

Arthur Searcy (6 January 1852 near Mount Barker, South Australia – 9 December 1935 in Harrow Road, St Peters, South Australia) was President of the Public Service, Deputy Commissioner of Taxes and Stamps and President of the Marine Board in South Australia.

== Life and career ==
Arthur Searcy was a son of William Searcy and his wife Charlotte Edwin née Roffe. His parents, and uncle Frederick Searcy, had arrived at Port Adelaide on 3 September 1849, on the ship Louisa Baillie . William Searcy was Chief Inspector of Police in South Australia. Arthur Searcy went to Pulteney Street School in Adelaide and was also educated by Dr. Sweatman in Port Lincoln.

He married Emily Louisa Payne (1855–1932), on 2 December 1871 at the residence of J. Kither of Norwood.

His first employment was by the legal firm of Stow & Bruce and later in the office of Brown & Thompson. Like his younger brother Alfred, he joined the Customs Department as a temporary hand, but his position was soon made permanent. His career developed as follows:

- Boarding Officer for Customs, 1873
- Clerk Customs, 1874
- Clerk Audit office, 1875
- Clerk Customs, 1876
- Tide Inspector and measurer of ships, Customs, 1889
- Corresponding Clerk Customs and Sea Marine Board, 1890
- Acting Deputy Commissioner of Taxes and Stamps, 1891
- Customs and Marine Board in 1894
- Clerk Assistant and Sergeant at Arms, House of Assembly, 1895
- Deputy Commissioner of Taxes and Stamps, 1897
- Deputy Commissioner of Taxes, 1901
- Press Marine and Board, 1902
- Inspector of kerosene, 1902
- Commissioner of Trade Marks and Registrar of Copyrights, 1904
- Controller of the Outer Harbour at Port Adelaide, 1907
- Controller of Ocean Steamers Wharf, 1909
- Chief Inspector under Inflammable Oils Act, 1909
- Superintendent of Life Saving Service, 1909
- Controller of Harbours and Chairman of Harbours Board Committee, 1911
- Retirement, 1917

Arthur Searcy created the scheme for the acquisition of wharfs and harbours by the government, and all of the wharfs were taken over under his guidance.

Arthur Searcy was highly respected and rather wealthy. He was invited to many functions. He attended for instance together with the Governor of South Australia the Coronation of King Edward VII and Queen Alexandra on 26 June 1902, the Coronation of King George V and Queen Mary on 24 May 1911, a memorial service for King Edward VII on 20 May 1910; the Mayor Easter Excursion on the River Murray on 5 April 1897; the official opening of the Electric Tramways system in Port Adelaide, during which he rode in the first car together with the Mayor J. Sweeney and members of the City Council. He was also invited to the Inauguration of Electric Lighting on the Brighton Jetty on 20 January 1917.

Upon his death he donated the Searcy Collection to the State Library of South Australia, containing three metres of scrapbooks (1892–1923), which include newspaper cuttings, obituaries and reminiscences etc. in 20 volumes as well as a total of 19,837 photographs, which he had taken himself or collected.

Searcy Bay on the west coast of Eyre Peninsula was named after him in 1908.
