= Searcy Bay Conservation Park =

Protected area in South Australia

- IUCN category III (natural monument or feature)
- Location within South Australia
- Location: South Australia
- Nearest city: Streaky Bay
- Coordinates: 33°2′23.42″S 134°14′31.13″E
- Area: 8.68 km^{2} (3.35 sq mi)
- Established: 9 February 2012
- Governing body: Department for Environment and Water

Searcy Bay Conservation Park is a protected area located on the west coast of Eyre Peninsula in South Australia about 25 kilometres (16 miles) south of Streaky Bay.

It was proclaimed under the National Parks and Wildlife Act 1972 in 2012 for the purpose of protecting an ‘important breeding habitat for the eastern osprey (Pandion cristatus) and white-bellied sea-eagle (Haliaeetus leucogaster)’ and to provide ‘provide important habitat for threatened shorebirds and migratory birds, including the hooded plover (Thinornis rubricollis), sooty oystercatcher (Haematopus fuliginosus) and sanderling (Calidris alba).’ Its name is derived from Searcy Bay which itself is derived from Alfred Searcy.

The conservation park is classified as an IUCN Category III protected area.
