= George Searcy =

Australian rules footballer (1855–1927)

George Henry Grass Searcy
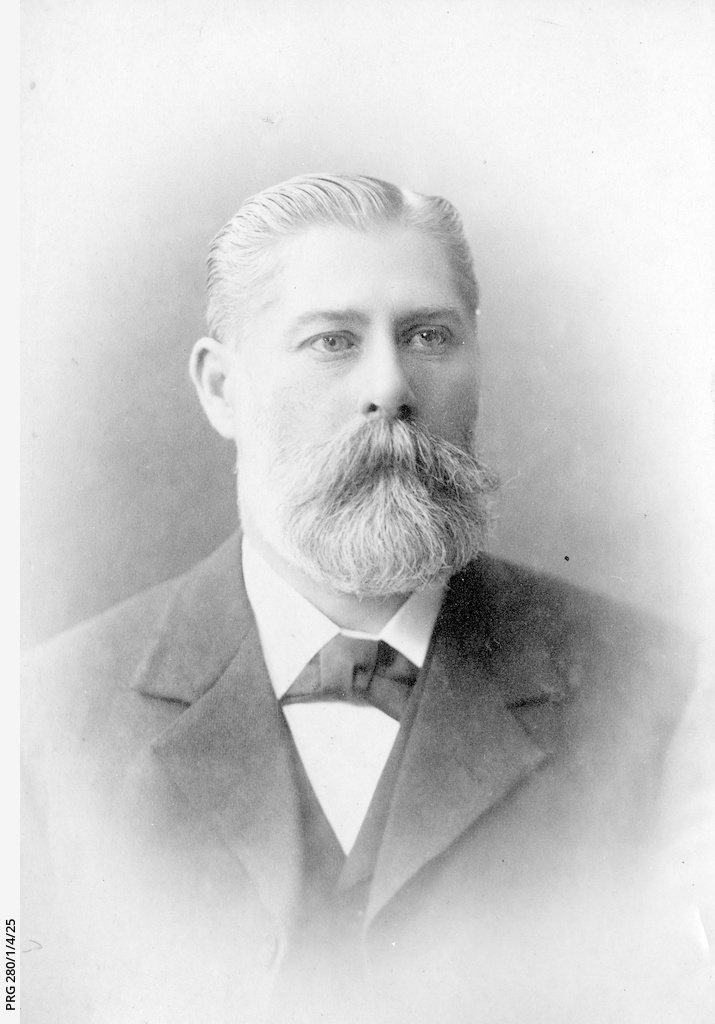
- Searcy in 1890
- Born: 15 January 1855; Geelong, Victoria, Australia
- Died: 6 January 1927 (aged 71); Rose Park, South Australia, Australia
- Resting place: Payneham Cemetery, Payneham, South Australia, Australia
- Occupations: cashier, accountant
- Spouse: Eleanor Fox
- Children: Frederick Henry Searcy (1878–1948), Herbert Leslie Searcy (1884–1967), Arthur Algernon George Searcy (1888–1914)
- Parent(s): Frederick Searcy and Dinah formerly Simmons nee Grass
- Relatives: Alfred Searcy and Arthur Searcy, first cousins

George Henry Grass Searcy (15 January 1855 – 6 January 1927) was an Australian sportsman, sports official and accountant.

== Family ==
Searcy was born on 15 January 1855 in Geelong, Victoria, Australia, the son of Frederick Searcy and Dinah formerly Simmonds née Grass. His father, and uncle William, had arrived at Port Adelaide on 3 September 1849, on the ship Louisa Baillie.

George married Eleanor Fox, daughter of Henry Fox, on 16 October 1877 at St Mary's English Church, in the inner Melbourne suburb of Hotham. George and Eleanor had three sons.

== Community engagement ==
He was active in the South Australian Liberal Federation, and acted as their accountant for 12 years, and was also being involved in a number of community organisations. He served as auditor to the Kensington and Norwood Corporation for 37 years.

== Career ==
He worked as a cashier and accountant.

He was convicted of fraud on his employer, the Metropolitan Building Society (Melbourne) in 1882 and sentenced to two years imprisonment.

== Sporting career ==
Searcy was a prominent sportsman, on the cricket and Australian rules football playing fields, and later as an official, he was associated with the:

- East Melbourne Cricket Club, and was a fine bowler;
- in South Australia the North Adelaide Cricket Club and played for several years
- He was a cricket umpire and was cricket Test match umpire in international matches for Maclaren's team, between Australia and England in Adelaide on 11 January to 15 January 1895, standing with 'Dimboola' Jim Phillips. Australia won by 382 runs. In December 1892, he and Charles Bannerman umpired the first-ever Sheffield Shield match.
- He played for the Norwood Football Club and was for a time secretary, and was made a life member. He was also a delegate to the South Australian Football League.

== See also ==
- Australian Test Cricket Umpires
- List of Test umpires
