= Alfred Searcy =

(1854–1925) customs officer, parliamentary official and author

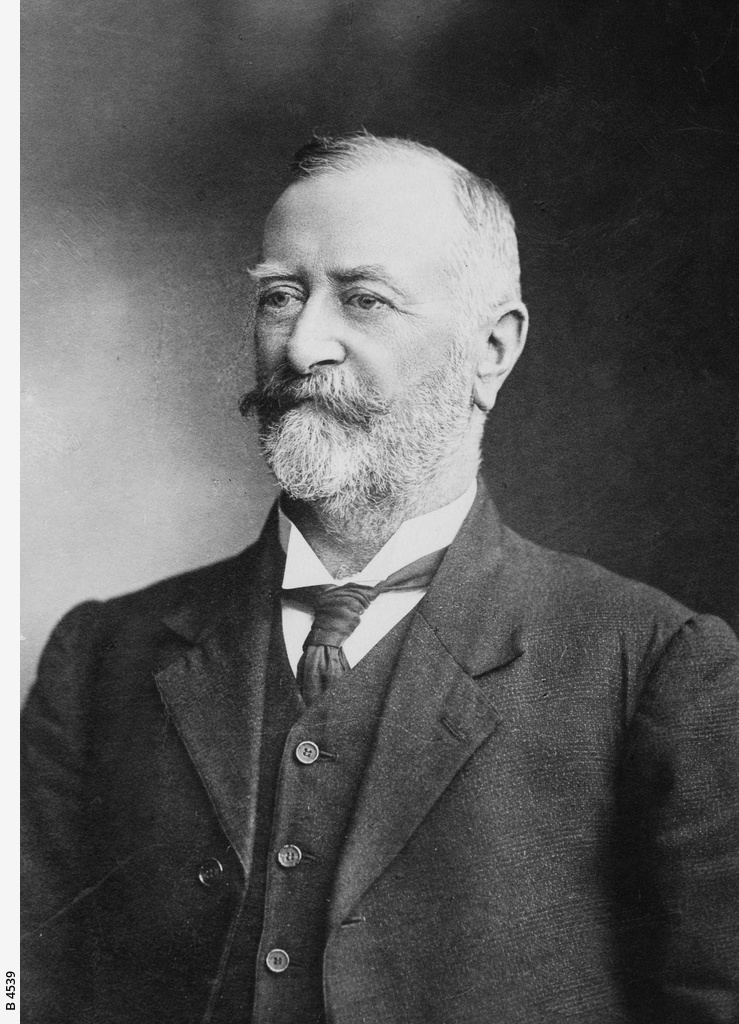
- Born: 4 January 1854; Mount Barker, South Australia, Australia
- Died: 1 October 1925 (aged 71); Adelaide, South Australia, Australia
- Resting place: North Road Cemetery, Nailsworth, South Australia, Australia
- Occupation(s): Customs officer, Parliamentary officer, Writer
- Spouse: Jane Annette Rainsford
- Children: Stella Maud Searcy (1877–1965), Walter Henry Searcy (1880–1970), Clara Millicent Searcy (1882–1969), Hilda Rainsford Searcy (1884–1935), Frederick William Searcy (1886–1887), Reginald Alfred Searcy (1889–1957), Eric Palmerston Searcy (1890–1967)
- Parent(s): William Searcy and Charlotte Edwin nee Roffe
- Relatives: Arthur Searcy, brother; George Searcy, first cousin; Robert Cabbell Roffe, grandfather

Alfred Searcy (4 January 1854 – 1 October 1925) was a South Australian public servant and writer. He was based in Darwin from 1882 to 1896 and was a booster for development of northern Australia during and after his time there.

== Family and education ==
He was the son of William Searcy, clerk and policeman, and his wife Charlotte Edwin, née Roffe, and brother of Arthur Searcy who also had a distinguished career as a South Australian public servant. His parents, and uncle Frederick Searcy, had arrived at Port Adelaide on 3 September 1849, on the ship Louisa Baillie.

He attended Dumas' school, Mount Barker, later Pulteney Street School, Adelaide, until 1869.

On 10 February 1876, he married Jane Annette Rainsford, daughter of Joseph Rainsford and Jane née Brown at Holy Trinity Church, Adelaide.

Alfred Searcy died on 1 October 1925 in Adelaide and was buried in North Road Cemetery.

== Career ==
In 1869, he was indentured as a journalist with The Advertiser, joining the customs department in 1873. In the period before 1882, he received the certificate of the Royal Humane Society, London, for saving a woman from drowning and became a captain in the Port Adelaide Rifle Company.

From 1882 he was sub-collector of customs in Darwin, Northern Territory and implemented new customs arrangements generally and licensing and duty arrangements for Macassan trepangers. He was promoted in 1888, however for health reasons his wife and children returned to Adelaide in 1890. He joined Paul Foelsche and Edward Robinson on several voyages.

He remained in Darwin until 1896, when he became clerk assistant and sergeant-at-arms in the South Australian House of Assembly, a position previously held by his brother, Arthur. He became Clerk of the House in 1918 and Clerk of the parliaments in 1920.

=== Writer ===
In Northern Seas, published in 1905 collected newspaper articles about his period in the Northern Territory. He reworked and extended the material as In Australian Tropics, published in 1907, with By Flood and Field, published in 1911, being a fictionalised account of the earlier books.

== See also ==
- SS Ellengowan
