= 2015 UCI BMX World Championships – Men's race =

Men's race at the 2015 UCI BMX World Championships
- Venue: Heusden-Zolder, Belgium
- Date: 25 July 2015
- Competitors: 75

Medalists
gold medal	Niek Kimmann	Netherlands
silver medal	Jelle van Gorkom	Netherlands
bronze medal	David Graf	Switzerland

The Men's race event of the 2015 UCI BMX World Championships was held on 25 July 2015.

== Results ==
=== Motos ===
Heat	Rank	Name	Nation	Time	Note
1	1	Niek Kimmann	Netherlands	34.431 (1)	Q
1	2	Julian Schmidt	Germany	35.413 (2)	Q
1	3	Amidou Mir	France	35.770 (3)	Q
1	4	Ramiro Marino	Argentina	35.841 (4)	Q
1	5	Rogerio Dos Reis	Brazil	36.011 (5)	
1	6	Corey Frieswyk	Australia	39.861 (6)	
1	7	Gustaw Dadela	Poland	56.909 (7)	
2	1	Raymon van der Biezen	Netherlands	34.327 (1)	Q
2	2	Alfredo Campo	Ecuador	35.048 (2)	Q
2	3	Niklas Laustsen	Denmark	37.908 (3)	Q
2	4	Brandon Reid	Canada	40.496 (4)	Q
2	5	Marc Willers	New Zealand	1:49.970 (5)	
2	6	Steven Cisar	United States	DNF (6)	
2	7	Evgeny Kleshchenko	Russia	DNS (9)	
3	1	Joris Harmsen	Netherlands	34.315 (1)	Q
3	2	Yoshitaku Nagasako	Japan	35.006 (2)	Q
3	3	Kristaps Veksa	Latvia	35.176 (3)	Q
3	4	Thomas Zula	United States	35.970 (4)	Q
3	5	Jimmi Therkelsen	Denmark	36.138 (5)	
3	6	Bence Bujaki	Hungary	36.499 (6)	
3	7	Bradley Game	Australia	37.234 (7)	
4	1	Sylvain Andre	France	34.851 (1)	Q
4	2	Jan Švub	Czech Republic	35.395 (2)	Q
4	3	Federico Villegas	Argentina	35.537 (3)	Q
4	4	Kai Sakakibara	Australia	36.039 (4)	Q
4	5	Andrés Jiménez	Colombia	36.277 (5)	
4	6	Penias Tenthani	Zimbabwe	42.006 (6)	
5	1	Quentin Caleyron	France	34.271 (1)	Q
5	2	Rihards Veide	Latvia	34.737 (2)	Q
5	3	Aleksandr Katyshev	Russia	34.885 (3)	Q
5	4	Alexander Cameron	Australia	35.472 (4)	Q
5	5	Emilio Falla	Ecuador	35.973 (5)	
5	6	Michal Tomco	Slovakia	42.507 (6)	
6	1	Romain Mahieu	France	34.850 (1)	Q
6	2	Joshua Callan	Australia	35.198 (2)	Q
6	3	Sean Gaian	United States	35.986 (3)	Q
6	4	Leonardo Caze Dos Santos Neto	Brazil	36.653 (4)	Q
6	5	Bodi Turner	Australia	36.898 (5)	
6	6	Mattia Furlan	Italy	37.048 (6)	
7	1	Trent Jones	New Zealand	33.339 (1)	Q
7	2	Carlos Ramírez	Colombia	34.489 (2)	Q
7	3	James Brown	Canada	34.930 (3)	Q
7	4	Jukia Yoshimura	Japan	34.941 (4)	Q
7	5	Barry Nobles	United States	35.834 (5)	
7	6	Vladyslav Sapozhnikov	Ukraine	37.571 (6)	
8	1	Nicholas Long	United States	34.934 (1)	Q
8	2	Justin Posey	United States	35.199 (2)	Q
8	3	Romain Riccardi	Italy	35.261 (3)	Q
8	4	Tre Whyte	United Kingdom	35.480 (4)	Q
8	5	Sergio Salazar	Colombia	36.241 (5)	
8	6	Arminas Kazlauskis	Lithuania	36.839 (6)	
9	1	Quillan Isidore	United Kingdom	34.199 (1)	Q
9	2	Renaud Blanc	Switzerland	34.468 (2)	Q
9	3	Damien Godet	France	34.539 (3)	Q
9	4	Tore Navrestad	Norway	34.930 (4)	Q
9	5	Anderson Ezequiel de Souza Filho	Brazil	35.344 (5)	
9	6	Esteban Yaffar	Bolivia	53.860 (6)	
10	1	Martijn Jaspers	Netherlands	33.986 (1)	Q
10	2	Daniel Franks	New Zealand	34.819 (2)	Q
10	3	Wouter Segers	Belgium	35.086 (3)	Q
10	4	Mark Link	Netherlands	35.307 (4)	Q
10	5	Christopher Mireles	Mexico	36.135 (5)	
10	6	Viesturs Morozs	Latvia	36.188 (6)	
11	1	Dave van der Burg	Netherlands	34.079 (1)	Q
11	2	Luis Brethauer	Germany	34.318 (2)	Q
11	3	Miguel Calixto	Colombia	34.898 (3)	Q
11	4	James Palmer	Canada	35.491 (4)	Q
11	5	Maliek Byndloss	Jamaica	36.280 (5)	
11	6	Feddison Flanders	Aruba	36.541 (6)	
12	1	David Graf	Switzerland	33.174 (1)	Q
12	2	Kristens Krīgers	Latvia	33.812 (2)	Q
12	3	Gonzalo Molina	Argentina	34.820 (3)	Q
12	4	Kohei Yoshii	Japan	35.179 (4)	Q
12	5	Evgeny Komarov	Russia	35.433 (5)	
12	6	Tobias Franek	Austria	36.391 (6)	

=== 1/8 finals ===
Heat	Rank	Name	Nation	Time	Gap	Note
1	1	Joris Daudet	France	33.155	—N/a	Q
1	2	Damien Godet	France	33.724	+0.569	Q
1	3	Justin Posey	United States	34.494	+1.339	Q
1	4	Kyle Evans	United Kingdom	34.665	+1.510	Q
1	5	Miguel Calixto	Colombia	35.014	+1.859	
1	6	Kristaps Veksa	Latvia	35.435	+2.280	
1	7	Renato Rezende	Brazil	35.827	+2.672	
1	8	Niklas Laustsen	Denmark	36.215	+3.060	
2	1	Twan van Gendt	Netherlands	33.801	—N/a	Q
2	2	Niek Kimmann	Netherlands	33.998	+0.197	Q
2	3	Martijn Jaspers	Netherlands	34.259	+0.458	Q
2	4	Gonzalo Molina	Argentina	34.728	+0.927	Q
2	5	Wouter Segers	Belgium	39.761	+5.960	
2	6	Corben Sharrah	United States	43.679	+9.878	
2	7	Brandon Reid	Canada	1:10.637	+36.836	
2	8	Yoshitaku Nagasako	Japan	DNF		
3	1	Connor Fields	United States	33.114	—N/a	Q
3	2	Trent Jones	New Zealand	33.175	+0.061	Q
3	3	Dave van der Burg	Netherlands	33.836	+0.722	Q
3	4	David Herman	United States	34.065	+0.951	Q
3	5	Amidou Mir	France	34.446	+1.332	
3	6	Quillan Isidore	United Kingdom	35.662	+2.548	
3	7	Kai Sakakibara	Australia	36.657	+3.543	
3	8	Leonardo Caze Dos Santos Neto	Brazil	45.337	+12.223	
4	1	Sam Willoughby	Australia	33.526	—N/a	Q
4	2	David Graf	Switzerland	33.695	+0.169	Q
4	3	Anthony Dean	Australia	33.750	+0.224	Q
4	4	Rihards Veide	Latvia	34.413	+0.887	Q
4	5	James Palmer	Canada	35.072	+1.546	
4	6	Romain Riccardi	Italy	35.373	+1.847	
4	7	Kohei Yoshii	Japan	37.089	+3.563	
4	8	Māris Štrombergs	Latvia	39.470	+5.944	
5	1	Liam Phillips	United Kingdom	33.954	—N/a	Q
5	2	Quentin Caleyron	France	34.241	+0.287	Q
5	3	Tory Nyhaug	Canada	34.701	+0.747	Q
5	4	Romain Mahieu	France	35.138	+1.184	Q
5	5	Tre Whyte	United Kingdom	35.477	+1.523	
5	6	Mark Link	Netherlands	36.601	+2.647	
5	7	Jukia Yoshimura	Japan	41.012	+7.058	
5	8	Ramiro Marino	Argentina	55.866	+21.912	
6	1	Carlos Oquendo	Colombia	34.297	—N/a	Q
6	2	Carlos Ramírez	Colombia	34.360	+0.063	Q
6	3	Edžus Treimanis	Latvia	35.229	+0.932	Q
6	4	Kristens Krīgers	Latvia	35.258	+0.961	Q
6	5	James Brown	Canada	35.512	+1.215	
6	6	Alfredo Campo	Ecuador	36.350	+2.053	
6	7	Tore Navrestad	Norway	36.592	+2.295	
6	8	Sean Gaian	United States	37.334	+3.037	
7	1	Jelle van Gorkom	Netherlands	33.869	—N/a	Q
7	2	Sylvain André	France	34.607	+0.738	Q
7	3	Raymon van der Biezen	Netherlands	35.000	+1.131	Q
7	4	Luis Brethauer	Germany	36.435	+2.566	Q
7	5	Julian Schmidt	Germany	36.790	+2.921	
7	6	Joshua Callan	Australia	37.418	+3.549	
7	7	Nicholas Long	United States	41.555	+7.686	
7	8	Alexander Cameron	Australia	DNF		
8	1	Joris Harmsen	Netherlands	33.749	—N/a	Q
8	2	Jared Garcia	United States	34.380	+0.631	Q
8	3	Renaud Blanc	Switzerland	34.517	+0.768	Q
8	4	Federico Villegas	Argentina	34.545	+0.796	Q
8	5	Aleksandr Katyshev	Russia	34.724	+0.975	
8	6	Jan Švub	Czech Republic	35.890	+2.141	
8	7	Thomas Zula	United States	38.690	+4.941	
8	8	Daniel Franks	New Zealand	42.082	+8.333	

=== Quarter finals ===
Heat	Rank	Name	Nation	Time	Gap	Note
1	1	Joris Daudet	France	33.075	—N/a	Q
1	2	Joris Harmsen	Netherlands	33.665	+0.590	Q
1	3	Justin Posey	United States	33.971	+0.896	Q
1	4	Jared Garcia	United States	34.263	+1.188	Q
1	5	Renaud Blanc	Switzerland	34.304	+1.229	
1	6	Federico Villegas	Argentina	34.565	+1.490	
1	7	Damien Godet	France	34.730	+1.655	
1	8	Kyle Evans	United Kingdom	37.147	+4.072	
2	1	Niek Kimmann	Netherlands	33.527	—N/a	Q
2	2	Jelle van Gorkom	Netherlands	33.832	+0.305	Q
2	3	Raymon van der Biezen	Netherlands	34.172	+0.645	Q
2	4	Twan van Gendt	Netherlands	34.452	+0.925	Q
2	5	Martijn Jaspers	Netherlands	34.656	+1.129	
2	6	Luis Brethauer	Germany	45.752	+12.225	
2	7	Sylvain André	France	1:17.780	+44.253	
2	8	Gonzalo Molina	Argentina	DNF		
3	1	Connor Fields	United States	33.080	—N/a	Q
3	2	Carlos Oquendo	Colombia	33.948	+0.868	Q
3	3	Trent Jones	New Zealand	34.105	+1.025	Q
3	4	Dave van der Burg	Netherlands	34.347	+1.267	Q
3	5	David Herman	United States	36.724	+3.644	
3	6	Edžus Treimanis	Latvia	46.548	+13.468	
3	7	Kristens Krīgers	Latvia	1:23.514	+50.434	
3	8	Carlos Ramírez	Colombia	DNF		
4	1	Liam Phillips	United Kingdom	33.266	—N/a	Q
4	2	David Graf	Switzerland	33.480	+0.214	Q
4	3	Anthony Dean	Australia	33.544	+0.278	Q
4	4	Sam Willoughby	Australia	33.995	+0.729	Q
4	5	Romain Mahieu	France	34.002	+0.736	
4	6	Rihards Veide	Latvia	34.667	+1.401	
4	7	Quentin Caleyron	France	36.698	+3.432	
4	8	Tory Nyhaug	Canada	1:00.476	+27.210	

=== Semi finals ===
Heat	Rank	Name	Nation	Time	Gap	Note
1	1	Liam Phillips	United Kingdom	33.461	—N/a	Q
1	2	Anthony Dean	Australia	33.752	+0.291	Q
1	3	Carlos Oquendo	Colombia	34.216	+0.755	Q
1	4	Jelle van Gorkom	Netherlands	34.367	+0.906	Q
1	5	Dave van der Burg	Netherlands	34.834	+1.373	
1	6	Justin Posey	United States	38.925	+5.464	
1	7	Twan van Gendt	Netherlands	1:18.272	+44.811	
1	8	Joris Daudet	France	DNF		
2	1	Niek Kimmann	Netherlands	32.742	—N/a	Q
2	2	Sam Willoughby	Australia	33.387	+0.645	Q
2	3	David Graf	Switzerland	33.396	+0.654	Q
2	4	Raymon van der Biezen	Netherlands	33.870	+1.128	Q
2	5	Jared Garcia	United States	34.706	+1.964	
2	6	Trent Jones	New Zealand	34.782	+2.040	
2	7	Connor Fields	United States	37.661	+4.919	
2	8	Joris Harmsen	Netherlands	1:20.842	+48.100	

=== Final ===
Rank	Name	Nation	Time	Gap
1st place, gold medalist(s)	Niek Kimmann	Netherlands	33.386	—N/a
2nd place, silver medalist(s)	Jelle van Gorkom	Netherlands	33.753	+0.367
3rd place, bronze medalist(s)	David Graf	Switzerland	33.817	+0.431
4	Carlos Oquendo	Colombia	34.082	+0.696
5	Liam Phillips	United Kingdom	34.535	+1.149
6	Raymon van der Biezen	Netherlands	34.749	+1.363
7	Sam Willoughby	Australia	DNF	
8	Anthony Dean	Australia	DNF	
