= Cycling at the 2015 European Games – Men's BMX =

Men's BMX at the 2015 European Games
- Venue: BMX Velopark
- Date: 26, 28 June
- Competitors: 30 from 19 nations
- Winning time: 33.012

Medalists
| gold medal | Joris Daudet | France |
| silver medal | Twan van Gendt | Netherlands |
| bronze medal | David Graf | Switzerland |

External videos
- 26 June: Time trial & Superfinal time trial, Official video (YouTube)
- 26 June: Motos, Official video (YouTube)
- 28 June: Finals, Official video (YouTube)

The men's BMX event at the 2015 European Games in Baku took place on 26 and 28 June.

== Schedule ==
All times are Azerbaijan Summer Time (UTC+5).

| Date | Time | Round |
|---|---|---|
| 26 June 2015 | 14:50 | Qualifying time trial |
| 26 June 2015 | 15:40 | Time trial Superfinal |
| 26 June 2015 | 17:10 | Motos |
| 28 June 2015 | 15:15 | Semifinals |
| 28 June 2015 | 16:55 | Final |

== Results ==
=== Time trials ===
| Rank | Name | Qualifying | | Superfinal | |
| Rank | Name | Time | Rank | Time | Rank |
|---|---|---|---|---|---|
| 1 | Edžus Treimanis (LAT) | 33.842 | 9 | 33.228 | 1 |
| 2 | David Graf (SUI) | 33.189 | 2 | 33.307 | 2 |
| 3 | Amidou Mir (FRA) | 33.616 | 4 | 33.310 | 3 |
| 4 | Joris Daudet (FRA) | 32.938 | 1 | 33.379 | 4 |
| 5 | Tore Navrestad (NOR) | 33.979 | 13 | 33.472 | 5 |
| 6 | Luis Brethauer (GER) | 34.413 | 16 | 33.599 | 6 |
| 7 | Sylvain André (FRA) | 33.773 | 7 | 33.679 | 7 |
| 8 | Rihards Veide (LAT) | 33.932 | 12 | 33.734 | 8 |
| 9 | Renaud Blanc (SUI) | 33.618 | 5 | 33.803 | 9 |
| 10 | Jan Švub (CZE) | 33.899 | 11 | 33.819 | 10 |
| 11 | Niklas Laustsen (DEN) | 33.812 | 8 | 33.837 | 11 |
| 12 | Romain Riccardi (ITA) | 34.052 | 14 | 33.957 | 12 |
| 13 | Jelle van Gorkom (NED) | 34.382 | 15 | 34.038 | 13 |
| 14 | Kristens Krīgers (LAT) | 33.871 | 10 | 34.298 | 14 |
| 15 | Evgeny Komarov (RUS) | 33.720 | 6 | 34.833 | 15 |
| 16 | Twan van Gendt (NED) | 33.540 | 3 | 36.218 | 16 |
| 17 | Julian Schmidt (GER) | 34.484 | 17 | Did not advance | |
| 18 | Evgeny Kleshchenko (RUS) | 34.514 | 18 | Did not advance | |
| 19 | Klaus Bøgh Andresen (DEN) | 34.848 | 19 | Did not advance | |
| 20 | Mattia Furlan (ITA) | 34.885 | 20 | Did not advance | |
| 21 | Aleksandr Katyshev (RUS) | 34.974 | 21 | Did not advance | |
| 22 | Gustavo Alcojor (ESP) | 35.128 | 22 | Did not advance | |
| 23 | Tobias Franek (AUT) | 35.320 | 23 | Did not advance | |
| 24 | Ghinio Van de Weyer (BEL) | 35.556 | 24 | Did not advance | |
| 25 | Bence Bujaki (HUN) | 35.944 | 25 | Did not advance | |
| 26 | Michal Tomco (SVK) | 36.723 | 26 | Did not advance | |
| 27 | André Martins (POR) | 37.712 | 27 | Did not advance | |
| 28 | Arminas Kazlauskas (LTU) | 37.713 | 28 | Did not advance | |
| 29 | Vladyslav Sapozhnykov (UKR) | 38.907 | 29 | Did not advance | |
| 30 | Ioannis Korfiatis (GRE) | 52.160 | 30 | Did not advance | |

=== Motos ===
==== Heat 1 ====
| Rank | Name | 1st run | 2nd run | 3rd run | Total | Notes |
|---|---|---|---|---|---|---|
| 1 | Twan van Gendt (NED) | 33.311 (1) | 33.339 (1) | 33.011 (1) | 3 | Q |
| 2 | Renaud Blanc (SUI) | 33.789 (2) | 33.910 (2) | 34.272 (4) | 8 | Q |
| 3 | Rihards Veide (LAT) | 34.156 (3) | 34.523 (4) | 33.596 (2) | 9 | Q |
| 4 | Edžus Treimanis (LAT) | 34.991 (4) | 34.257 (3) | 34.155 (3) | 10 | Q |
| 5 | Julian Schmidt (GER) | 36.154 (6) | 35.315 (5) | 35.075 (5) | 16 | |
| 6 | Ghinio Van de Weyer (BEL) | 35.781 (5) | 35.617 (6) | 41.668 (7) | 18 | |
| 7 | Bence Bujaki (HUN) | 36.170 (7) | 41.924 (7) | 36.406 (6) | 20 | |

==== Heat 2 ====
| Rank | Name | 1st run | 2nd run | 3rd run | Total | Notes |
|---|---|---|---|---|---|---|
| 1 | Sylvain André (FRA) | 33.607 (1) | 33.925 (2) | 33.568 (1) | 4 | Q |
| 2 | Evgeny Komarov (RUS) | 33.915 (2) | 34.036 (3) | 34.357 (2) | 7 | Q |
| 3 | Evgeny Kleshchenko (RUS) | 34.754 (5) | 33.682 (1) | 34.391 (3) | 9 | Q |
| 4 | David Graf (SUI) | 34.188 (3) | 34.237 (4) | 34.633 (4) | 11 | Q |
| 5 | Jan Švub (CZE) | 34.520 (4) | 1:05.003 (7) | 35.104 (5) | 16 | |
| 6 | Michal Tomco (SVK) | 36.728 (7) | 38.878 (5) | 37.438 (6) | 18 | |
| 7 | Tobias Franek (AUT) | 35.569 (6) | 54.523 (6) | 37.648 (7) | 19 | |

==== Heat 3 ====
| Rank | Name | 1st run | 2nd run | 3rd run | Total | Notes |
|---|---|---|---|---|---|---|
| 1 | Amidou Mir (FRA) | 33.535 (1) | 34.337 (1) | 34.272 (1) | 3 | Q |
| 2 | Niklas Laustsen (DEN) | 33.752 (2) | 34.765 (2) | 34.273 (2) | 6 | Q |
| 3 | Kristens Krīgers (LAT) | 34.662 (4) | 35.189 (3) | 34.458 (3) | 10 | Q |
| 4 | Luis Brethauer (GER) | 34.099 (3) | 35.551 (4) | 35.141 (4) | 11 | Q |
| 5 | Gustavo Alcojor (ESP) | 35.972 (6) | 35.737 (5) | 35.623 (5) | 16 | |
| 6 | Klaus Bøgh Andresen (DEN) | 35.193 (5) | 36.281 (6) | 36.525 (6) | 17 | |
| 7 | André Martins (POR) | 39.925 (7) | 38.842 (7) | 37.767 (7) | 21 | |
| 8 | Ioannis Korfiatis (GRE) | 49.959 (8) | 51.798 (8) | 52.376 (8) | 24 | |

==== Heat 4 ====
| Rank | Name | 1st run | 2nd run | 3rd run | Total | Notes |
|---|---|---|---|---|---|---|
| 1 | Joris Daudet (FRA) | 32.966 (1) | 33.523 (1) | 33.539 (1) | 3 | Q |
| 2 | Jelle van Gorkom (NED) | 33.559 (2) | 34.489 (2) | 34.042 (2) | 6 | Q |
| 3 | Aleksandr Katyshev (RUS) | 34.754 (4) | 37.387 (6) | 34.470 (3) | 13 | Q |
| 4 | Romain Riccardi (ITA) | 1:03.016 (8) | 35.000 (3) | 34.875 (4) | 15 | Q |
| 5 | Mattia Furlan (ITA) | 35.314 (5) | 35.734 (4) | 38.349 (6) | 15 | |
| 6 | Arminas Kazlauskas (LTU) | 35.873 (6) | 37.191 (5) | 36.976 (5) | 16 | |
| 7 | Tore Navrestad (NOR) | 34.003 (3) | 1:26.348 (8) | 48.288 (8) | 19 | |
| 8 | Vladyslav Sapozhnykov (UKR) | 39.457 (7) | 38.228 (7) | 38.611 (7) | 21 | |

=== Semifinals ===
==== Semifinal 1 ====
| Rank | Name | Time | Notes |
|---|---|---|---|
| 1 | Twan van Gendt (NED) | 32.768 | Q |
| 2 | Joris Daudet (FRA) | 33.192 | Q |
| 3 | Evgeny Komarov (RUS) | 34.006 | Q |
| 4 | David Graf (SUI) | 34.369 | Q |
| 5 | Niklas Laustsen (DEN) | 35.059 | |
| 6 | Aleksandr Katyshev (RUS) | 35.614 | |
| 7 | Luis Brethauer (GER) | 36.236 | |
| 8 | Rihards Veide (LAT) | 1:11.571 | |

==== Semifinal 2 ====
| Rank | Name | Time | Notes |
|---|---|---|---|
| 1 | Amidou Mir (FRA) | 33.755 | Q |
| 2 | Jelle van Gorkom (NED) | 33.941 | Q |
| 3 | Sylvain André (FRA) | 34.020 | Q |
| 4 | Evgeny Kleshchenko (RUS) | 34.534 | Q |
| 5 | Edžus Treimanis (LAT) | 34.694 | |
| 6 | Romain Riccardi (ITA) | 35.132 | |
| 7 | Renaud Blanc (SUI) | 35.156 | |
| 8 | Kristens Krīgers (LAT) | 35.980 | |

=== Final ===
| Rank | Name | Time |
|---|---|---|
| 1st place, gold medalist(s) | Joris Daudet (FRA) | 33.012 |
| 2nd place, silver medalist(s) | Twan van Gendt (NED) | 33.887 |
| 3rd place, bronze medalist(s) | David Graf (SUI) | 34.166 |
| 4 | Sylvain André (FRA) | 34.352 |
| 5 | Evgeny Komarov (RUS) | 34.848 |
| 6 | Amidou Mir (FRA) | 35.100 |
| 7 | Evgeny Kleshchenko (RUS) | 35.138 |
| 8 | Jelle van Gorkom (NED) | 1:05.020 |
