= 2015 UCI BMX World Championships – Men's time trial =

Men's time trial at the 2015 UCI BMX World Championships
- Venue: Heusden-Zolder, Belgium
- Date: 24 July 2015
- Competitors: 91

Medalists
gold medal	Joris Daudet	France
silver medal	Niek Kimmann	Netherlands
bronze medal	Connor Fields	United States

The Men's time trial event of the 2015 UCI BMX World Championships was held on 24 July 2015.

== Results ==
=== Qualification ===
Rank	Name	Nation	Time	Gap	Note
1	Niek Kimmann	Netherlands	31.383		Q
2	Sam Willoughby	Australia	31.511	+0.128	Q
3	Liam Phillips	United Kingdom	31.677	+0.294	Q
4	Connor Fields	United States	31.711	+0.328	Q
5	Joris Daudet	France	31.759	+0.376	Q
6	Carlos Oquendo	Colombia	31.843	+0.460	Q
7	Edžus Treimanis	Latvia	31.845	+0.462	Q
8	Trent Jones	New Zealand	31.845	+0.462	Q
9	Jared Garcia	United States	31.875	+0.492	Q
10	Corben Sharrah	United States	31.876	+0.493	Q
11	Sylvain André	France	31.917	+0.534	Q
12	Raymon van der Biezen	Netherlands	31.930	+0.547	Q
13	Quentin Caleyron	France	31.942	+0.559	Q
14	Joris Harmsen	Netherlands	32.076	+0.693	Q
15	Bodi Turner	Australia	32.083	+0.700	Q
16	Māris Štrombergs	Latvia	32.092	+0.709	Q
17	Justin Posey	United States	32.167	+0.784	
18	Damien Godet	France	32.171	+0.788	
19	Martijn Jaspers	Netherlands	32.192	+0.809	
20	Dave van der Burg	Netherlands	32.197	+0.814	
21	David Graf	Switzerland	32.210	+0.827	
22	Tory Nyhaug	Canada	32.222	+0.839	
23	Kristens Krīgers	Latvia	32.241	+0.858	
24	Luis Brethauer	Germany	32.247	+0.864	
25	Daniel Franks	New Zealand	32.251	+0.868	
26	Renaud Blanc	Switzerland	32.265	+0.882	
27	Nicholas Long	United States	32.276	+0.893	
28	Carlos Ramírez	Colombia	32.283	+0.900	
29	Romain Mahieu	France	32.294	+0.911	
30	Rihards Veide	Latvia	32.308	+0.925	
31	Kai Sakakibara	Australia	32.328	+0.945	
32	Yoshitaku Nagasako	Japan	32.346	+0.963	
33	Kyle Evans	United Kingdom	32.382	+0.999	
34	Niklas Laustsen	Denmark	32.404	+1.021	
35	Twan van Gendt	Netherlands	32.440	+1.057	
36	Amidou Mir	France	32.452	+1.069	
37	Anthony Dean	Australia	32.463	+1.080	
38	Ramiro Marino	Argentina	32.538	+1.155	
39	Alfredo Campo	Ecuador	32.544	+1.161	
40	Jelle van Gorkom	Netherlands	32.566	+1.183	
41	Jimmi Therkelsen	Denmark	32.601	+1.218	
42	Federico Villegas	Argentina	32.673	+1.290	
43	Aleksandr Katyshev	Russia	32.695	+1.312	
44	Joshua Callan	Australia	32.726	+1.343	
45	Barry Nobles	United States	32.756	+1.373	
46	Sergio Salazar	Colombia	32.787	+1.404	
47	Tore Navrestad	Norway	32.794	+1.411	
48	Mark Link	Netherlands	32.823	+1.440	
49	James Palmer	Canada	32.827	+1.444	
50	David Herman	United States	32.881	+1.498	
51	Evgeny Komarov	Russia	32.894	+1.511	
52	Gonzalo Molina	Argentina	32.937	+1.554	
53	Renato Rezende	Brazil	32.953	+1.570	
54	Miguel Calixto	Colombia	32.977	+1.594	
55	Wouter Segers	Belgium	33.005	+1.622	
56	Quillan Isidore	United Kingdom	33.046	+1.663	
57	Romain Riccardi	Italy	33.074	+1.691	
58	Jukia Yoshimura	Japan	33.195	+1.812	
59	Sean Gaian	United States	33.307	+1.924	
60	Alexander Cameron	Australia	33.335	+1.952	
61	Jan Švub	Czech Republic	33.338	+1.955	
62	Thomas Zula	United States	33.395	+2.012	
63	Steven Cisar	United States	33.436	+2.053	
64	Julian Schmidt	Germany	33.461	+2.078	
65	Rogerio Dos Reis	Brazil	33.464	+2.081	
66	Marc Willers	New Zealand	33.631	+2.248	
67	Bence Bujaki	Hungary	33.733	+2.350	
68	Andrés Jiménez	Colombia	33.749	+2.366	
69	Emilio Falla	Ecuador	33.786	+2.403	
70	Mattia Furlan	Italy	33.880	+2.497	
71	James Brown	Canada	33.897	+2.514	
72	Tre Whyte	United Kingdom	33.942	+2.559	
73	Anderson Ezequiel de Souza Filho	Brazil	34.032	+2.649	
74	Christopher Mireles	Mexico	34.091	+2.708	
75	Feddison Flanders	Aruba	34.348	+2.965	
76	Tobias Franek	Austria	34.356	+2.973	
77	Kohei Yoshii	Japan	34.594	+3.211	
78	Maliek Byndloss	Jamaica	34.684	+3.301	
79	Viesturs Morozs	Latvia	34.703	+3.320	
80	Esteban Yaffar	Bolivia	35.078	+3.695	
81	Arminas Kazlauskis	Lithuania	35.608	+4.225	
82	Vladyslav Sapozhnikov	Ukraine	36.060	+4.677	
83	Leonardo Caze Dos Santos Neto	Brazil	37.241	+5.858	
84	Michal Tomco	Slovakia	38.094	+6.711	
85	Penias Tenthani	Zimbabwe	40.051	+8.668	
86	Bradley Game	Australia	48.438	+17.055	
87	Brandon Reid	Canada	58.696	+27.313	
88	Gustaw Dadela	Poland	1:07.376	+35.993	
89	Corey Frieswyk	Australia	DNF		
90	Evgeny Kleshchenko	Russia	DNF		
91	Kristaps Veksa	Latvia	DNF		

=== Super final ===
Rank	Name	Nation	Time	Gap
1st place, gold medalist(s)	Joris Daudet	France	30.953	
2nd place, silver medalist(s)	Niek Kimmann	Netherlands	31.029	+0.076
3rd place, bronze medalist(s)	Connor Fields	United States	31.288	+0.335
4	Sam Willoughby	Australia	31.341	+0.388
5	Liam Phillips	United Kingdom	31.496	+0.543
6	Edžus Treimanis	Latvia	31.537	+0.584
7	Raymon van der Biezen	Netherlands	31.580	+0.627
8	Jared Garcia	United States	31.644	+0.691
9	Joris Harmsen	Netherlands	31.779	+0.826
10	Sylvain André	France	32.004	+1.051
11	Carlos Oquendo	Colombia	32.074	+1.121
12	Quentin Caleyron	France	32.518	+1.565
13	Māris Štrombergs	Latvia	32.805	+1.852
14	Bodi Turner	Australia	32.840	+1.887
15	Trent Jones	New Zealand	33.065	+2.112
16	Corben Sharrah	United States	1:05.902	+34.949
