= 2016 in cycle sport =

The 2016 in cycling results is given as follows:

== BMX racing ==
- January 1 – December 11: 2016 UCI BMX Events Calendar

=== 2016 Summer Olympics (UCI–BMX) ===
- August 17–19: 2016 Summer Olympics (BMX) in (Brazil) Rio de Janeiro at the Olympic BMX Centre
  - Men: (gold) (United States) Connor Fields; (silver) (Netherlands) Jelle van Gorkom; (bronze) (Colombia) Carlos Ramírez
  - Women: (gold) (Colombia) Mariana Pajón; (silver) (United States) Alise Post; (bronze) (Venezuela) Stefany Hernández

=== International BMX championships ===
- January 31: 2016 Oceania BMX Continental Championships in (New Zealand) Auckland
  - Men's Elite winner: (New Zealand) Trent Jones
  - Women's Elite winner: (New Zealand) Sarah Walker
  - Men's Junior winner: (New Zealand) Maynard Peel
  - Women's Junior winner: (Australia) Saya Sakakibara
- March 28: 2016 Pan American BMX Continental Championships in (Argentina) Santiago del Estero
  - Men's Elite winner: (Argentina) Gonzalo Molina
  - Women's Elite winner: (Colombia) Mariana Pajón
  - Men's Junior winner: (Ecuador) Wilson Goyes Larrea
  - Women's Junior winner: (Brazil) Paola Reis
- April 24: 2016 North American BMX Continental Championships in (United States) Rock Hill, South Carolina
  - Men's Elite winner: (United States) Nicholas Long
  - Women's Elite winner: (United States) Alise Post
  - Men's Junior winner: (Canada) Deven Kawa (default)
- May 25 – 29: 2016 UCI BMX World Championships in (Colombia) Medellín
  - The Netherlands won both the gold and overall medal tallies.
- June 12: 2016 Asian BMX Continental Championship in (China) Taiyuan
  - Men's Elite winner: (Japan) Jukia Yoshimura
  - Women's Elite winner: (China) Yan Lu
  - Men's Junior winner: (Japan) Daichi Yamaguchi
  - Women's Junior winner: (Japan) Sae Hatakeyama
- July 8–10: 2016 UEC European BMX Continental Championships in (Italy) Verona
  - Men's Elite winner: (Netherlands) Raymon van der Biezen
  - Women's Elite winner: (Germany) Sarah Sailer
  - Men's Elite Time Trial winner: (France) Romain Mahieu
  - Women's Elite Time Trial winner: (Netherlands) Merel Smulders
  - Men's Junior winner: (France) Mathis Ragot Richard
  - Women's Junior winner: (Netherlands) Merel Smulders
- October 2: 2016 African BMX Continental Championships in (South Africa) Giba Gorge, KwaZulu-Natal
  - Men's Elite winner: (South Africa) Kyle Dodd
  - Men's Junior winner: (South Africa) Dylan Eggar

=== 2016 BMX Supercross World Cup ===
- March 25 & 26: 2016 UCI BMX Supercross World Cup #1 in (Argentina) Santiago del Estero
  - Men's Elite winner: (United States) Corben Sharrah
  - Women's Elite winner: (Australia) Caroline Buchanan
- April 9 & 10: 2016 UCI BMX Supercross World Cup #2 in (United Kingdom) Manchester
  - Men's Elite winner: (United Kingdom) Liam Phillips
  - Women's Elite winner: (Australia) Caroline Buchanan
- May 7 & 8: 2016 UCI BMX Supercross World Cup #3 in (Netherlands) Papendal
  - Men's Elite winner: (Latvia) Māris Štrombergs
  - Women's Elite winner: (Netherlands) Laura Smulders
- September 30 & October 1: 2016 UCI BMX Supercross World Cup #4 in (United States) Rock Hill, South Carolina
  - Men's Elite winner: (United States) Corben Sharrah
  - Women's Elite winner: (Netherlands) Laura Smulders
- October 8 & 9: 2016 UCI BMX Supercross World Cup #5 (final) in (United States) Sarasota, Florida
  - Men's Elite winner: (United States) Corben Sharrah
  - Women's Elite winner: (Netherlands) Laura Smulders

=== 2016 BMX European Cup ===
- April 1 – 3: European Cup #1 and #2 in (Belgium) Heusden-Zolder
  - Men's Elite #1 winner: (Latvia) Rihards Veide
  - Men's Elite #2 winner: (Netherlands) Dave van der Burg
  - Men's Junior #1 winner: (France) Thomas Jouve
  - Men's Junior #2 winner: (Netherlands) Kevin van de Groenendaal
  - Women's Elite #1 winner: (Netherlands) Judy Baauw
  - Women's Elite #2 winner: (Canada) Daina Tuchscherer
  - Women's Junior #1 winner: (Netherlands) Merel Smulders
  - Women's Junior #2 winner: (Netherlands) Merel Smulders
- April 29 – May 1: European Cup #3 and #4 in (Netherlands) Kampen
  - Men's Elite #1 winner: (Latvia) Kristens Krigers
  - Men's Elite #2 winner: (Latvia) Rihards Veide
  - Men's Junior #1 winner: (France) Léo Avril
  - Men's Junior #2 winner: (France) Thomas Jouve
  - Women's Elite #1 winner: (Netherlands) Judy Baauw
  - Women's Elite #2 winner: (Netherlands) Judy Baauw
  - Women's Junior #1 winner: (Netherlands) Ruby Huisman
  - Women's Junior #2 winner: (Netherlands) Merel Smulders
- June 11–13: European Cup #5 and #6 in (Germany) Weiterstadt
  - Men's Elite #1 winner: (Latvia) Kristens Krigers
  - Men's Elite #2 winner: (Latvia) Kristens Krigers
  - Men's Junior #1 winner: (United Kingdom) Paddy Sharrock
  - Men's Junior #2 winner: (Switzerland) Cédric Butti
  - Women's Elite #1 winner: (Czech Republic) Romana Labounková
  - Women's Elite #2 winner: (Netherlands) Judy Baauw
  - Women's Junior #1 winner: (Netherlands) Merel Smulders
  - Women's Junior #2 winner: (Netherlands) Merel Smulders
- September 16–18: European Cup #7 and #8 in (France) Calais (final)
  - Men's Elite #1 winner: (United Kingdom) Kyle Evans
  - Men's Elite #2 winner: (Latvia) Rihards Veide
  - Men's Junior #1 winner: (United Kingdom) Paddy Sharrock
  - Men's Junior #2 winner: (United Kingdom) Paddy Sharrock
  - Women's Elite #1 winner: (Denmark) Simone Christensen
  - Women's Elite #2 winner: (Denmark) Simone Christensen
  - Women's Junior #1 winner: (Netherlands) Merel Smulders
  - Women's Junior #2 winner: (Netherlands) Merel Smulders

== Cyclo-cross bike racing ==
- September 16, 2015: CC World Cup #1 in (United States) Las Vegas
  - Men's Elite winner: (Belgium) Wout Van Aert
  - Women's Elite winner: (Czech Republic) Kateřina Nash
- October 18, 2015: CC World Cup #2 in (Netherlands) Valkenburg aan de Geul
  - Men's Elite winner: (Netherlands) Lars van der Haar
  - Women's Elite winner: (Italy) Eva Lechner
  - Men's U23 winner: (Italy) Gioele Bertolini
  - Men's Junior winner: (Belgium) Jappe Jaspers
- November 22, 2015: CC World Cup #3 in (Belgium) Koksijde
  - Men's Elite winner: (Belgium) Sven Nys
  - Women's Elite winner: (Belgium) Sanne Cant
  - Men's Under 23 winner: (Belgium) Eli Iserbyt
  - Men's Junior winner: (Netherlands) Jens Dekker
- December 20, 2015: CC World Cup #4 in Namur, Belgium
  - Men's Elite winner: (Netherlands) Mathieu van der Poel
  - Women's Elite winner: (United Kingdom) Nikki Harris
  - Men's Under 23 winner: (Belgium) Eli Iserbyt
  - Men's Junior winner: (Belgium) Jappe Jaspers
- December 26, 2015: CC World Cup #5 in (Belgium) Heusden-Zolder
  - Men's Elite winner: (Netherlands) Mathieu van der Poel
  - Women's Elite winner: (Belgium) Sanne Cant
  - Men's Under 23 winner: (Netherlands) Joris Nieuwenhuis
  - Men's Junior winner: (France) Thomas Bonnet
- January 17: CC World Cup #6 in (France) Lignières, Cher
  - Men's Elite winner: (Netherlands) Mathieu van der Poel
  - Women's Elite winner: (Belgium) Sanne Cant
  - Men's Under 23 winner: (Belgium) Eli Iserbyt
  - Men's Junior winner: (Netherlands) Mitch Groot
- January 24: CC World Cup #7 (final) in (Netherlands) Hoogerheide
  - Men's Elite winner: (Netherlands) Mathieu van der Poel
  - Women's Elite winner: (Netherlands) Sophie de Boer
  - Men's Under 23 winner: (Belgium) Quinten Hermans
  - Men's Junior winner: (Netherlands) Jens Dekker
- January 30 & 31: 2016 UCI Cyclo-cross World Championships in (Belgium) Heusden-Zolder
  - Men's Elite winner: (Belgium) Wout Van Aert
  - Women's Elite winner: (Netherlands) Thalita de Jong
  - Men's Under 23 winner: (Belgium) Eli Iserbyt
  - Women's Under 23 winner: (United Kingdom) Evie Richards
  - Men's Junior winner: (Netherlands) Jens Dekker

=== Cyclo-Cross Cycling UCI Superprestige 2015–2016 ===
- October 4, 2015: CC Superprestige #1 in (Netherlands) Gieten
  - Men's Cyclo-Cross winner: (Belgium) Wout Van Aert
  - Women's Cyclo-Cross winner: (Belgium) Sanne Cant
  - Men's Junior Cyclo-Cross winner: (Netherlands) Jens Dekker
  - Men's Under 23 Cyclo-Cross winner: (Belgium) Daan Hoeyberghs
- October 25, 2015: CC Superprestige #2 in (Belgium) Zonhoven
  - Men's Cyclo-Cross winner: (Belgium) Wout Van Aert
  - Women's Cyclo-Cross winner: (Belgium) Sanne Cant
  - Men's Junior Cyclo-Cross winner: (Netherlands) Jens Dekker
  - Men's Under 23 Cyclo-Cross winner: (Belgium) Eli Iserbyt
- November 8, 2015: CC Superprestige #3 in (Belgium) Ruddervoorde
  - Men's Cyclo-Cross winner: (Belgium) Kevin Pauwels
  - Women's Cyclo-Cross winner: (Belgium) Sanne Cant
  - Men's Junior Cyclo-Cross winner: (Belgium) Jappe Jaspers
  - Men's Under 23 Cyclo-Cross winner: (Belgium) Eli Iserbyt
- November 15, 2015: CC Superprestige #4 in (Belgium) Gavere
  - Men's Cyclo-Cross winner: (Belgium) Wout Van Aert
  - Women's Cyclo-Cross winner: (Belgium) Sanne Cant
  - Men's Junior Cyclo-Cross winner: (Netherlands) Jens Dekker
  - Men's Under 23 Cyclo-Cross winner: (Belgium) Eli Iserbyt
- December 13, 2015: CC Superprestige #5 in (Belgium) Francorchamps
  - Men's Cyclo-Cross winner: (Belgium) Wout Van Aert
  - Women's Cyclo-Cross winner: (United Kingdom) Helen Wyman
  - Men's Junior Cyclo-Cross winner: (Belgium) Seppe Rombouts
  - Men's Under 23 Cyclo-Cross winner: (Belgium) Nicolas Cleppe
- December 27, 2015: CC Superprestige #6 in (Belgium) Diegem
  - Men's Cyclo-Cross winner: (Netherlands) Mathieu van der Poel
  - Women's Cyclo-Cross winner: (Belgium) Ellen Van Loy
  - Men's Junior Cyclo-Cross winner: (Belgium) Jappe Jaspers
  - Men's Under 23 Cyclo-Cross winner: (Belgium) Quinten Hermans
- February 7, 2016: CC Superprestige #7 in (Belgium) Hoogstraten
  - Men's Cyclo-Cross winner: (Netherlands) Mathieu van der Poel
  - Women's Cyclo-Cross winner: (Belgium) Sanne Cant
  - Men's Under 23 Cyclo-Cross winner: (Belgium) Eli Iserbyt
  - Men's Junior Cyclo-Cross winner: (Netherlands) Jens Dekker
- February 13, 2016: CC Superprestige #8 (final) in (Belgium) Middelkerke
  - Men's Cyclo-Cross winner: (Netherlands) Mathieu van der Poel
  - Women's Cyclo-Cross winner: (Belgium) Sanne Cant
  - Men's Under 23 Cyclo-Cross winner: (Belgium) Eli Iserbyt
  - Men's Junior Cyclo-Cross winner: (Netherlands) Jens Dekker

=== Cyclo-Cross Cycling UCI Bank BPost Trophy 2015–2016 ===
- October 11: Bank BPost Trophy #1 in (Belgium) Ronse
  - Men's winner: (Belgium) Wout Van Aert
  - Women's winner: (Czech Republic) Pavla Havlíková
  - Men's U23 winner: (Belgium) Eli Iserbyt
  - Men's Junior winner: (Netherlands) Jens Dekker
- November 1: Bank BPost Trophy #2 in (Belgium) Koppenberg
  - Men's winner: (Belgium) Wout Van Aert
  - Women's Cyclo-Cross winner: (Belgium) Jolien Verschueren
  - Men's Under 23 Cyclo-Cross winner: (Belgium) Quinten Hermans
  - Men's Junior Cyclo-Cross winner: (Belgium) Seppe Rombouts
- November 29: Bank BPost Trophy #3 in (Belgium) Hamme
  - Men's winner: (Belgium) Wout Van Aert
  - Women's winner: (United Kingdom) Helen Wyman
  - Men's U23 winner: (Belgium) Eli Iserbyt
  - Men's Junior Cyclo-Cross winner: (Belgium) Florian Vermeersch
- December 5: Bank BPost Trophy #4 in (Belgium) Essen
  - Men's winner: (Belgium) Wout Van Aert
  - Women's Cyclo-Cross winner: (Belgium) Sanne Cant
  - Men's U23 winner: (Belgium) Quinten Hermans
  - Men's Junior Cyclo-Cross winner: (Netherlands) Thijs Wolsink
- December 19: Bank BPost Trophy #5 in (Belgium) Antwerp
  - Men's winner: (Belgium) Wout Van Aert
  - Women's Cyclo-Cross winner: (Belgium) Sanne Cant
  - Men's U23 winner: (Belgium) Quinten Hermans
  - Men's Junior Cyclo-Cross winner: (Belgium) Reno Bauters
- December 29: Bank BPost Trophy #6 in (Belgium) Loenhout
  - Men's winner: (Belgium) Tom Meeusen
  - Women's Cyclo-Cross winner: (Belgium) Sanne Cant
  - Men's U23 winner: (Belgium) Daan Hoeyberghs
  - Men's Junior Cyclo-Cross winner: (Netherlands) Thijs Wolsink
- January 1: Bank BPost Trophy #7 in (Belgium) Baal
  - Men's winner: (Belgium) Wout Van Aert
  - Women's Cyclo-Cross winner: (Belgium) Sanne Cant
  - Men's U23 winner: (Belgium) Quinten Hermans
  - Men's Junior Cyclo-Cross winner: (Belgium) Seppe Rombouts
- February 6: Bank BPost Trophy #8 (final) in (Belgium) Sint-Niklaas
  - Men's winner: (Belgium) Laurens Sweeck
  - Women's Cyclo-Cross winner: (Netherlands) Thalita de Jong
  - Men's U23 winner: (Belgium) Daan Soete
  - Men's Junior Cyclo-Cross winner: (Netherlands) Jens Dekker

== Mountain bike racing ==
- January 15 – December 4: 2016 UCI Mountain Biking Events Calendar

=== 2016 Summer Olympics (UCI–MB) ===
- August 20 & 21: 2016 Summer Olympics (MB) in (Brazil) Rio de Janeiro at the Olympic Mountain Bike Park
  - Men's XC: (gold) (Switzerland) Nino Schurter; (silver) (Czech Republic) Jaroslav Kulhavý; (bronze) (Spain) Carlos Coloma Nicolás
  - Women's XC: (gold) (Sweden) Jenny Rissveds; (silver) (Poland) Maja Włoszczowska; (bronze) (Canada) Catharine Pendrel

=== International mountain biking championships ===
- March 26 & 27: 2016 Oceania Mountain Bike Continental Championships in Queenstown, New Zealand
  - Men's XC winner: (New Zealand) Anton Cooper
  - Women's XC winner: (Australia) Rebecca Henderson
  - Men's Downhill winner: (New Zealand) Bryn Dickerson
  - Women's Downhill winner: (New Zealand) Alanna Columb
  - Men's XC Eliminator winner: (New Zealand) Eden Cruise
  - Men's U23 (XC) winner: (New Zealand) Ben Oliver
  - Women's U23 (XC) winner: (New Zealand) Amber Johnston
  - Men's Junior (XC) winner: (Australia) Kian Lerch-MacKinnon
  - Women's Junior (XC) winner: (New Zealand) Jessica Manchester
- March 30 – April 3: 2016 American Mountain Bike Continental Championships in (Argentina) San Fernando del Valle de Catamarca
  - Men's XC winner: (Argentina) Catriel Soto
  - Women's XC winner: (Mexico) Daniela Campuzano
  - Men's U23 XC winner: (Colombia) Brandon Rivera
  - Women's U23 XC winner: (Colombia) Yossiana Quintero
  - Men's Junior XC winner: (Colombia) Wilson Pena
  - Women's Junior XC winner: (Colombia) Natalia Rojas Figueroa
  - Men's XC Eliminator winner: (Puerto Rico) Ricky Morales
  - Women's XC Eliminator winner: (Argentina) Noelia Rodriguez
  - Mixed XC Team Relay winners: Colombia (Jhon Fredy Gazzon, Brandon Rivera,Yossiana Quintero, Favio Castañeda)
- March 30 – April 3: 2016 African Mountain Bike Continental Championships in (Lesotho) Afriski
  - Men's XC winner: (South Africa) Philip Buys
  - Women's XC winner: (South Africa) Mariske Strauss
  - Men's Downhill winner: (South Africa) Tiaan Odendaal
  - Men's U23 (XC) winner: (South Africa) Alan Hatherly
  - Women's U23 (XC) winner: (South Africa) Genevieve van Coller
  - Men's Junior (XC) winner: (Namibia) Herbert Peters
  - Women's Junior (XC) winner: (South Africa) Danielle Strydom
  - Men's Marathon winner: (Mauritius) Yannick Lincoln
  - Women's Marathon winner: (South Africa) Amy McDougall
  - Mixed XC Team Relay winners: Namibia (Michelle Vorster, Raul Costa Seibeb, Herbert Peters, Tristan de Lange)
- May 4 – 8: 2016 Asian Mountain Bike Continental Championships in Chai Nat
  - Men's XC winner: (Japan) Kohei Yamamoto
  - Women's XC winner: (China) Ren Chengyuan
  - Men's Downhill winner: (Japan) Kazuki Shimizu
  - Women's Downhill winner: (Thailand) Vipavee Deekaballes
  - Men's Junior (XC) winner: (Thailand) Klahan Master Athichanan
  - Women's Junior (XC) winner: (Thailand) Nathalie Panyawan
  - Men's XC Eliminator winner: (Thailand) Keerati Sukprasart
  - Women's XC Eliminator winner: (Thailand) Warinothorn Phetpraphan
  - Mixed XC Team Relay winners: Thailand (Klahan Master Athichanan, Peerapol Chawchiangkwang, Keerati Sukprasart, Supaksorn Nuntana)
- May 5 – 8: 2016 European Mountain Bike Continental Championships in (Sweden) Jönköping, Huskvarna
  - Men's XC winner: (France) Julien Absalon
  - Women's XC winner: (Switzerland) Jolanda Neff
  - Men's U23 (XC) winner: (France) Victor Koretzky
  - Women's U23 (XC) winner: (Switzerland) Sina Frei
  - Men's Junior (XC) winner: (France) Thomas Bonnet
  - Women's Junior (XC) winner: (United Kingdom) Sophie Wright
  - Men's XC Eliminator winner: (Sweden) Emil Linde
  - Women's XC Eliminator winner: (Ukraine) Iryna Popova
  - Mixed XC Team Relay winners: Switzerland (Marcel Guerrini, Vital Albin, Jolanda Neff, Lars Förster)
- June 25 & 26: 2016 UCI Mountain Bike Marathon World Championships in (France) Laissac
  - Men's XC winner: (Portugal) Tiago Ferreira
  - Women's XC winner: (Switzerland) Jolanda Neff
- June 29 – July 3: 2016 UCI Mountain Bike & Trials World Championships (XCO & XCE only) in (Czech Republic) Nové Město na Moravě
  - Men's XC winner: (Switzerland) Nino Schurter
  - Women's XC winner: (Denmark) Annika Langvad
  - Men's U23 (XC) winner: (New Zealand) Sam Gaze
  - Women's U23 (XC) winner: (Sweden) Jenny Rissveds
  - Men's Junior (XC) winner: (France) Thomas Bonnet
  - Women's Junior (XC) winner: (Sweden) Ida Jansson
  - Men's XC Eliminator winner: (Austria) Daniel Federspiel
  - Women's XC Eliminator winner: (Switzerland) Linda Indergand
  - Mixed team relay winners: France (Victor Koretzky, Benjamin le Ny, Pauline Ferrand-Prévot, Jordan Sarrou)
- September 6–11: 2016 UCI Mountain Bike & Trials World Championships (DHI & 4X only) in (Italy) Val di Sole
  - Men's Elite Downhill winner: (United Kingdom) Danny Hart
  - Women's Elite Downhill winner: (United Kingdom) Rachel Atherton
  - Men's Junior Downhill winner: (Canada) Finnley Iles
  - Women's Junior Downhill winner: (Italy) Alessia Missiaggia
  - Men's 4X winner: (Slovenia) Mitja Ergaver
  - Women's 4X winner: (Australia) Caroline Buchanan

=== 2016 UCI Mountain Bike World Cup ===
- April 9 & 10: World Cup #1 in (France) Lourdes
  - Men's Elite Downhill winner: (United States) Aaron Gwin
  - Women's Elite Downhill winner: (United Kingdom) Rachel Atherton
  - Men's Junior Downhill winner: (Canada) Finnley Iles
- April 23 & 24: World Cup #2 in (Australia) Cairns
  - Men's Elite Downhill winner: (France) Loïc Bruni
  - Women's Elite Downhill winner: (United Kingdom) Rachel Atherton
  - Men's Elite XC winner: (Switzerland) Nino Schurter
  - Women's Elite XC winner: (Denmark) Annika Langvad
  - Men's U23 XC winner: (New Zealand) Sam Gaze
  - Women's U23 XC winner: (United States) Kate Courtney
  - Men's Junior Downhill winner: (United Kingdom) Matt Walker
- May 21 & 22: World Cup #3 in (Germany) Albstadt
  - Men's Elite XC winner: (Switzerland) Nino Schurter
  - Women's Elite XC winner: (Denmark) Annika Langvad
  - Men's U23 XC winner: (New Zealand) Sam Gaze
  - Women's U23 XC winner: (Switzerland) Sina Frei
- May 28 & 29: World Cup #4 in (France) La Bresse
  - Men's Elite XC winner: (France) Julien Absalon
  - Women's Elite XC winner: (Switzerland) Jolanda Neff
  - Men's U23 XC winner: (France) Titouan Carod
  - Women's U23 XC winner: (Switzerland) Sina Frei
- June 4 & 5: World Cup #5 in (United Kingdom) Fort William, Highland
  - Men's Elite Downhill winner: (South Africa) Greg Minnaar
  - Women's Elite Downhill winner: (United Kingdom) Rachel Atherton
  - Men's Junior Downhill winner: (Canada) Finnley Iles
- June 11 & 12: World Cup #6 in (Austria) Leogang
  - Men's Elite Downhill winner: (United States) Aaron Gwin
  - Women's Elite Downhill winner: (United Kingdom) Rachel Atherton
  - Men's Junior Downhill winner: (France) Gaëtan Vige
- July 9 & 10: World Cup #7 in (Switzerland) Lenzerheide
  - Men's Elite XC winner: (Switzerland) Nino Schurter
  - Women's Elite XC winner: (Sweden) Jenny Rissveds
  - Men's Elite Downhill winner: (United Kingdom) Danny Hart
  - Women's Elite Downhill winner: (United Kingdom) Tahnee Seagrave
  - Men's Junior Downhill winner: (Canada) Finnley Iles
  - Men's U23 XC winner: (France) Titouan Carod
  - Women's U23 XC winner: (Switzerland) Sina Frei
- August 6 & 7: World Cup #8 in (Canada) Mont-Sainte-Anne
  - Men's Elite XC winner: (France) Julien Absalon
  - Women's Elite XC winner: (Canada) Catharine Pendrel
  - Men's Elite Downhill winner: (United Kingdom) Danny Hart
  - Women's Elite Downhill winner: (United Kingdom) Rachel Atherton
  - Men's Junior Downhill winner: (France) Gaëtan Vige
  - Men's U23 XC winner: (France) Titouan Carod
  - Women's U23 XC winner: (Switzerland) Sina Frei
- September 3 & 4: World Cup #9 (final) in (Andorra) Vallnord
  - Men's Elite XC winner: (France) Julien Absalon
  - Women's Elite XC winner: (Switzerland) Jolanda Neff
  - Men's Elite Downhill winner: (United Kingdom) Danny Hart
  - Women's Elite Downhill winner: (United Kingdom) Rachel Atherton
  - Men's Junior Downhill winner: (France) Gaëtan Vige
  - Men's U23 XC winner: (Switzerland) Marcel Guerrini
  - Women's U23 XC winner: (Switzerland) Sina Frei

== Road cycling ==
=== 2016 Summer Olympics ===
- Men's road race: (gold) Greg Van Avermaet (BEL); (silver) Jakob Fuglsang (DEN); (bronze) Rafał Majka (POL)
- Women's road race: (gold) Anna van der Breggen (NED); (silver) Emma Johansson (SWE); (bronze) Elisa Longo Borghini (ITA)
- Men's time trial: (gold) Fabian Cancellara (SUI); (silver) Tom Dumoulin (NED); (bronze) Chris Froome (GBR)
- Women's time trial: (gold) Kristin Armstrong (USA); (silver) Olga Zabelinskaya (RUS); (bronze) Anna van der Breggen (NED)

=== Grand Tours ===
- May 6 – 29: 2016 Giro d'Italia
  - Winner: (Italy) Vincenzo Nibali (XDS Astana Team) (second Giro d'Italia win, fourth Grand Tour win)
- July 2–24: 2016 Tour de France
  - Winner: (United Kingdom) Chris Froome (Netcompany–Ineos) (third Tour de France win, third Grand Tour win)
- August 20 – September 11: 2016 Vuelta a España
  - Winner: (Colombia) Nairo Quintana (Movistar Team) (first Vuelta a España win, second Grand Tour win)

== Track cycling ==
- October 30, 2015 – 2016: 2015–16 UCI Track Cycling Calendar of Events

=== 2016 Summer Olympics (UCI–TC) ===
- April 30 & May 1: Aquece Rio International Track Cycling Challenge 2016 in (Brazil) Rio de Janeiro (Olympic Test Event)
  - Note: Event cancelled, due to venue not ready for competition yet.
- August 11–16: 2016 Summer Olympics (TC) in (Brazil) Rio de Janeiro at the Barra Velodrome
  - Men
  - Men's Keirin: (gold) (United Kingdom) Jason Kenny; (silver) (Netherlands) Matthijs Büchli; (bronze) (Malaysia) Azizulhasni Awang
  - Men's Omnium: (gold) (Italy) Elia Viviani; (silver) (United Kingdom) Mark Cavendish; (bronze) (Denmark) Lasse Norman Hansen
  - Men's Sprint: (gold) (United Kingdom) Jason Kenny; (silver) (United Kingdom) Callum Skinner; (bronze) (Russia) Denis Dmitriev
  - Men's Team Pursuit: (gold) Great Britain (WR); (silver) Australia; (bronze) Denmark
  - Men's Team Sprint: (gold) Great Britain (OR); (silver) New Zealand; (bronze) France
  - Women
  - Women's Keirin: (gold) (Netherlands) Elis Ligtlee; (silver) (United Kingdom) Becky James; (bronze) (Australia) Anna Meares
  - Women's Omnium: (gold) (United Kingdom) Laura Trott; (silver) (United States) Sarah Hammer; (bronze) (Belgium) Jolien D'Hoore
  - Women's Sprint: (gold) (Germany) Kristina Vogel; (silver) (United Kingdom) Becky James; (bronze) (United Kingdom) Katy Marchant
  - Women's Team Pursuit: (gold) Great Britain (WR); (silver) United States; (bronze) Canada
  - Women's Team Sprint:
  - (gold) China (Gong Jinjie & Zhong Tianshi)
  - (silver) Russia (Daria Shmeleva & Anastasia Voynova)
  - (bronze) Germany (Miriam Welte & Kristina Vogel)

=== International track cycling events ===
- January 26–30: 2016 Asian Cycling Championships in (Japan) Izu, Shizuoka
  - South Korea and China won 6 gold medals each. South Korea won the overall medal tally.
- February 15 – 19: 2016 African Track Championships in Casablanca
  - Morocco won both the gold and overall medal tallies.
- March 2–6: 2016 UCI Track Cycling World Championships in (United Kingdom) London
  - Great Britain won both the gold and overall medal tallies.
- March 17–20: 2016 UCI Para-cycling Track World Championships in (Italy) Montichiari
  - Great Britain won both the gold and overall medal tallies.
- July 20–24: 2016 UCI Juniors Track World Championships in (Switzerland) Aigle
  - New Zealand won both the gold and overall medal tallies.
- October 5–9: 2016 Pan American Track Cycling Championships in (Mexico) Aguascalientes City
  - Colombia won both the gold and overall medal tallies.
- October 19–23: 2016 European Track Cycling Championships in Paris (Saint-Quentin-en-Yvelines)
  - France and Russia won 3 gold medals each. Great Britain and the Netherlands won 8 overall medals each.

=== 2015–16 UCI Track Cycling World Cup ===
- October 30, 2015 – November 1, 2015: World Cup #1 in (Colombia) Cali
  - Germany won both the gold and overall medal tallies.
- December 5 & 6, 2015: World Cup #2 in Cambridge, New Zealand
  - Germany won the gold medal tally. Germany and Team Jayco–AIS won 5 overall medals each.
- January 16 & 17: World Cup #3 (final) in Hong Kong
  - France won the gold medal tally. Great Britain won the overall medal tally.

== Trial cycling ==
- May 28 & 29: Trial World Cup #1 in (Poland) Kraków
  - Men's Elite 20" winner: (Spain) Benito Ros
  - Men's Elite 26" winner: (France) Aurelien Fontenoy
  - Women's Elite winner: (Germany) Nina Reichenbach
- July 9 & 10: Trial World Cup #2 in (France) Les Menuires
  - Men's Elite 20" winner: (Germany) Dominik Oswald
  - Men's Elite 26" winner: (United Kingdom) Jack Carthy
  - Women's Elite winner: (Germany) Nina Reichenbach
- July 30 & 31: Trial World Cup #3 in (Austria) Vöcklabruck
  - Men's Elite 20" winner: (Spain) Abel Mustieles
  - Men's Elite 26" winner: (United Kingdom) Jack Carthy
  - Women's Elite winner: (Germany) Nina Reichenbach
- August 20 & 21: Trial World Cup #4 in (France) Albertville
  - Men's Elite 20" winner: (Spain) Abel Mustieles
  - Men's Elite 26" winner: (United Kingdom) Jack Carthy
  - Women's Elite winner: (Germany) Nina Reichenbach
- August 29 – September 3: 2016 UCI Trials World Championships in (Italy) Vermiglio–Val di Sole
  - Men's Elite 20" winner: (Spain) Abel Mustieles
  - Men's Elite 26" winner: (United Kingdom) Jack Carthy
  - Women's Elite winner: (Germany) Nina Reichenbach
- September 24 & 25: Trial World Cup #5 (final) in (Belgium) Antwerp
  - Men's Elite 20" winner: (Spain) Abel Mustieles
  - Men's Elite 26" winner: (United Kingdom) Jack Carthy
  - Women's Elite winner: (Australia) Janine Jungfels

== Games ==
- February 6–9: South Asian Games in (India) Guwahati
- March 17–20: World University Cycling Championship in (Philippines) Tagaytay
- August 6–21: Summer Olympics in (Brazil) Rio de Janeiro
- September 8–17: Summer Paralympics in (Brazil) Rio de Janeiro
