= Cycling at the 2016 Summer Olympics – Men's BMX =

Men's BMX at the Games of the XXXI Olympiad
- Venue: Olympic BMX Centre
- Date: 17–19 August 2016
- Competitors: 32 from 21 nations
- Winning time: 34.642 s

Medalists
1st place, gold medalist(s)		Connor Fields	United States
2nd place, silver medalist(s)		Jelle van Gorkom	Netherlands
3rd place, bronze medalist(s)		Carlos Ramírez	Colombia

The men's BMX racing competition at the 2016 Olympic Games in Rio de Janeiro took place at the Olympic BMX Centre on 17–19 August.

The medals were presented by Camiel Eurlings, IOC member, Netherlands and Artur Lopes, member of the UCI Management Committee.

== Schedule ==
All times are Brasília Time (UTC-03:00)

Date	Time	Round
Wednesday, 17 August 2016	14:34	Seeding run
Thursday, 18 August 2016	13:30	Qualification
Friday, 19 August 2016	13:38	Semi-finals and final

== Results ==
Q - qualified for the next round; DNF - did not finish

=== Seeding run ===
Rank	Name	Time	Notes
1	Joris Daudet (FRA)	34.617	
2	David Graf (SUI)	34.678	
3	Sam Willoughby (AUS)	34.714	
4	Connor Fields (USA)	34.768	
5	Corben Sharrah (USA)	34.893	
6	Twan van Gendt (NED)	34.933	
7	Māris Štrombergs (LAT)	34.953	
8	Niek Kimmann (NED)	35.070	
9	Nicholas Long (USA)	35.088	
10	Liam Phillips (GBR)	35.095	
11	Amidou Mir (FRA)	35.248	
12	Yoshitaku Nagasako (JPN)	35.286	
13	Bodi Turner (AUS)	35.333	
14	Carlos Oquendo (COL)	35.341	
15	Luis Brethauer (GER)	35.379	
16	Renato Rezende (BRA)	35.404	
17	Jelle van Gorkom (NED)	35.413	
18	Tory Nyhaug (CAN)	35.422	
19	Carlos Ramírez (COL)	35.423	
20	Anthony Dean (AUS)	35.445	
21	Kyle Evans (GBR)	35.776	
22	Jérémy Rencurel (FRA)	35.884	
23	Jefferson Milano (VEN)	35.945	
24	Niklas Laustsen (DEN)	36.199	
25	Trent Jones (NZL)	36.331	
26	Kyle Dodd (RSA)	36.454	
27	Alfredo Campo (ECU)	36.463	
28	Tore Navrestad (NOR)	36.484	
29	Gonzalo Molina (ARG)	36.860	
30	Evgeny Komarov (RUS)	36.958	
31	Toni Syarifudin (INA)	40.975	
32	Edžus Treimanis (LAT)		DNF

=== Quarter-finals ===
==== Heat 1 ====
Rank	Name	1st run	2nd run	3rd run	Total	Notes
1	Jelle van Gorkom (NED)	35.101 (1)	35.872 (1)	36.680 (4)	6	Q
2	Trent Jones (NZL)	35.455 (3)	35.561 (2)	36.173 (2)	7	Q
3	Nicholas Long (USA)	35.730 (5)	40.046 (4)	35.331 (1)	10	Q
4	Niek Kimmann (NED)	35.725 (4)	1:47.485 (7)	36.431 (3)	14	Q
5	Edžus Treimanis (LAT)	36.022 (7)	37.619 (3)	37.379 (5)	15	
6	Joris Daudet (FRA)	35.434 (2)	DNF (8)	DNF (8)	18	
7	Niklas Laustsen (DEN)	36.965 (8)	44.351 (5)	41.942 (6)	19	
8	Renato Rezende (BRA)	35.970 (6)	1:19.255 (6)	1:44.597 (7)	19	

==== Heat 2 ====
Rank	Name	1st run	2nd run	3rd run	Total	Notes
1	Tory Nyhaug (CAN)	35.958 (1)	35.035 (1)	38.754 (2)	4	Q
2	Luis Brethauer (GER)	37.386 (2)	36.234 (2)	39.384 (3)	7	Q
3	Jefferson Milano (VEN)	41.709 (3)	36.296 (3)	40.894 (6)	12	Q
4	David Graf (SUI)	2:54.204 (7)	1:14.051 (6)	38.390 (1)	14	Q
5	Māris Štrombergs (LAT)	1:36.876 (6)	44.376 (4)	39.554 (4)	14	
6	Kyle Dodd (RSA)	42.683 (4)	50.545 (5)	39.959 (5)	14	
7	Toni Syarifudin (INA)	45.325 (5)	1:21.149 (7)	DNS (10)	22	
8	Liam Phillips (GBR)	DNF (8)	DNS (10)	DNS (10)	28	

==== Heat 3 ====
Rank	Name	1st run	2nd run	3rd run	Total	Notes
1	Sam Willoughby (AUS)	35.877 (1)	35.130 (1)	35.152 (1)	3	Q
2	Carlos Oquendo (COL)	37.728 (3)	35.607 (3)	35.699 (3)	9	Q
3	Twan van Gendt (NED)	1:46.311 (6)	35.293 (2)	35.217 (2)	10	Q
4	Carlos Ramírez (COL)	37.054 (2)	36.181 (5)	36.020 (4)	11	Q
5	Jérémy Rencurel (FRA)	40.894 (4)	35.927 (4)	1:30.329 (6)	14	
6	Evgeny Komarov (RUS)	41.584 (5)	40.430 (6)	39.770 (5)	16	
7	Amidou Mir (FRA)	DNF (8)	DNS (10)	DNS (10)	28	
8	Alfredo Campo (ECU)	DNF (8)	DNS (10)	DNS (10)	28	

==== Heat 4 ====
Rank	Name	1st run	2nd run	3rd run	Total	Notes
1	Anthony Dean (AUS)	35.934 (2)	34.994 (1)	35.193 (1)	4	Q
2	Connor Fields (USA)	35.191 (1)	35.761 (4)	35.601 (3)	8	Q
3	Corben Sharrah (USA)	36.213 (4)	35.558 (3)	35.447 (2)	9	Q
4	Gonzalo Molina (ARG)	36.078 (3)	35.412 (2)	36.122 (5)	10	Q
5	Bodi Turner (AUS)	39.094 (6)	42.436 (8)	35.721 (4)	18	
6	Tore Navrestad (NOR)	42.105 (8)	35.904 (5)	36.715 (6)	19	
7	Kyle Evans (GBR)	37.230 (5)	40.351 (7)	37.203 (7)	19	
8	Yoshitaku Nagasako (JPN)	41.455 (7)	39.258 (6)	47.041 (8)	21	

=== Semi-finals ===
==== Heat 1 ====
Rank	Name	1st run	2nd run	3rd run	Total	Notes
1	Anthony Dean (AUS)	35.243 (1)	34.901 (1)	34.832 (1)	3	Q
2	Jelle van Gorkom (NED)	35.337 (2)	35.615 (6)	35.038 (3)	11	Q
3	Carlos Ramírez (COL)	35.537 (3)	35.261 (3)	42.706 (5)	11	Q
4	Nicholas Long (USA)	35.858 (5)	35.450 (5)	34.921 (2)	12	Q
5	Corben Sharrah (USA)	36.289 (6)	35.164 (2)	35.352 (4)	12	
6	Carlos Oquendo (COL)	35.740 (4)	35.420 (4)	55.966 (6)	14	
7	David Graf (SUI)	45.335 (8)	36.057 (7)	2:10.243 (7)	22	
8	Luis Brethauer (GER)	36.400 (7)	36.230 (8)	DNF (8)	23	

==== Heat 2 ====
Rank	Name	1st run	2nd run	3rd run	Total	Notes
1	Sam Willoughby (AUS)	34.888 (1)	34.478 (1)	34.686 (1)	3	Q
2	Connor Fields (USA)	35.163 (2)	34.802 (2)	36.176 (6)	10	Q
3	Niek Kimmann (NED)	35.676 (4)	36.147 (6)	35.222 (2)	12	Q
4	Tory Nyhaug (CAN)	36.714 (6)	35.025 (3)	35.640 (3)	12	Q
5	Twan van Gendt (NED)	35.905 (5)	35.732 (5)	35.663 (4)	14	
6	Gonzalo Molina (ARG)	39.102 (7)	35.541 (4)	35.807 (5)	16	
7	Trent Jones (NZL)	35.425 (3)	1:05.161 (7)	36.391 (7)	17	
8	Jefferson Milano (VEN)	1:56.976 (8)	1:14.157 (8)	38.018 (8)	24	

=== Final ===
Rank	Name	Time
1st place, gold medalist(s)	Connor Fields (USA)	34.642
2nd place, silver medalist(s)	Jelle van Gorkom (NED)	35.316
3rd place, bronze medalist(s)	Carlos Ramírez (COL)	35.517
4	Nicholas Long (USA)	35.522
5	Tory Nyhaug (CAN)	35.674
6	Sam Willoughby (AUS)	36.325
7	Niek Kimmann (NED)	36.579
8	Anthony Dean (AUS)	DNF
