= Cycling at the 2020 Summer Olympics – Men's BMX racing =

Olympic cycling event

Men's BMX racing at the Games of the XXXII Olympiad
- Olympic BMX cycling
- Venue: Ariake Urban Sports Park
- Date: 29–30 July 2021
- Competitors: 24 from 17 nations
- Winning time: 39.053 s

Medalists
1st place, gold medalist(s)		Niek Kimmann	Netherlands
2nd place, silver medalist(s)		Kye Whyte	Great Britain
3rd place, bronze medalist(s)		Carlos Ramírez	Colombia

The men's BMX racing competition at the 2020 Summer Olympics took place on 29 and 30 July 2021 at the Ariake Urban Sports Park. 24 cyclists from 17 nations competed in the event.

== Background ==
This was the 4th appearance of the event, which has been held at every Summer Olympics since BMX racing was added to the programme in 2008.

The reigning Olympic champion was Connor Fields of the United States, and the reigning (2019) World Champion was Twan van Gendt of the Netherlands. Fields suffered a horrific crash in his semi-final heat and was unable to continue racing. He was hospitalized.

A preview by Olympics.com noted the favourites as Fields, van Gendt, Niek Kimmann (also of the Netherlands), Joris Daudet of France, and Carlos Ramírez of Colombia.

== Qualification ==
A National Olympic Committee (NOC) could enter up to three qualified cyclists in the BMX race. Quota places are allocated to the NOC, which selects the cyclists. There were 24 quota places available, allocated as follows:

- UCI nation ranking (18 places): The top two NOCs each earn three places. NOCs ranked third to fifth each earn two places. NOCs ranked sixth through 11th each earn one place. Each continent was guaranteed one place.
- UCI elite individual ranking (three places): The three NOCs with the top individuals on this ranking, which have not yet earned any quota places, each earn one place.
- 2020 World Championships (two places): The top two NOCs at the 2020 UCI BMX World Championships, which have not yet earned any quota places, each earn one place. Because the 2020 World Championships were cancelled due to the COVID-19 pandemic, these places were reallocated to the UCI nation ranking.
- Host place (one place): Host nation Japan was guaranteed one place.

== Competition format ==
The competition was a three-round tournament, with quarterfinals, semifinals, and a final. The time-trial seeding run from previous Games was eliminated. In each round, the cyclists raced around a 400 metres (1,300 ft) course with jumps and banked turns. The competition proceeded as follows:

- Quarterfinals: four heats of six cyclists each. Each heat had three runs, using a point-for-place system (one point for the winner of a run, two points for second, etc.), with the lowest points over the three runs winning. The best four cyclists in each heat (16 total) advanced to the semifinals; the others (eight cyclists) were eliminated.
- Semifinals: two heats of eight cyclists each. Again there were three runs per heat, using the point-for-place system. The top four cyclists in each semifinal (eight total) advanced to the final; the others (eight cyclists) were eliminated.
- Final: one final of eight cyclists. There was only a single run.

== Schedule ==
The event took place over two consecutive days.

H	Heats	QF	Quarterfinals	SF	Semifinals	F	Finals

BMX, mountain biking and road cycling
Event↓/Date →	24 July	25 July	26 July	27 July	28 July	29 July	30 July		31 Jul	1 Aug
BMX Racing
Men's BMX racing						QF	SF	F		

== Results ==
=== Quarterfinals ===
==== Heat 1 ====
Rank	#	Name	1st run	2nd run	3rd run	Total	Notes
1	3	Sylvain André (FRA)	40.436 (1)	40.131 (1)	40.294 (1)	3	Q
2	5	Kye Whyte (GBR)	41.012 (3)	40.201 (2)	40.983 (4)	9	Q
3	100	Romain Mahieu (FRA)	40.701 (2)	40.603 (3)	40.996 (5)	10	Q
4	24	Corben Sharrah (USA)	41.408 (4)	41.222 (5)	40.537 (2)	11	Q
5	993	Yoshitaku Nagasako (JPN)	41.862 (5)	40.984 (4)	40.851 (3)	12	
6	950	Alex Limberg (RSA)	46.005 (6)	50.119 (6)	44.773 (6)	18	

==== Heat 2 ====
Rank	#	Name	1st run	2nd run	3rd run	Total	Notes
1	313	Niek Kimmann (NED)	40.681 (2)	40.249 (1)	39.932 (1)	4	Q
2	1	Twan van Gendt (NED)	40.555 (1)	40.477 (2)	40.258 (2)	5	Q
3	500	Renato Rezende (BRA)	40.980 (3)	40.983 (4)	40.705 (3)	10	Q
4	143	Nicolás Torres (ARG)	41.243 (4)	40.527 (3)	42.525 (6)	13	Q
5	76	Helvijs Babris (LAT)	41.529 (5)	41.710 (5)	42.490 (5)	15	
6	66	James Palmer (CAN)	41.708 (6)	41.971 (6)	41.167 (4)	16	

==== Heat 3 ====
Rank	#	Name	1st run	2nd run	3rd run	Total	Notes
1	33	Joris Daudet (FRA)	40.570 (1)	40.207 (1)	39.911 (1)	3	Q
2	921	Joris Harmsen (NED)	40.698 (2)	40.327 (2)	40.463 (2)	6	Q
3	40	Tore Navrestad (NOR)	41.122 (3)	40.768 (3)	41.395 (3)	9	Q
4	120	Vincent Pelluard (COL)	41.479 (5)	41.675 (5)	41.452 (4)	14	Q
5	179	Simon Marquart (SUI)	41.274 (4)	41.675 (4)	1:25.514 (6)	14	
6	155	Evgeny Kleshchenko (ROC)	42.432 (6)	41.912 (6)	42.337 (5)	17	

==== Heat 4 ====
Rank	#	Name	1st run	2nd run	3rd run	Total	Notes
1	11	Connor Fields (USA)	40.887 (2)	41.084 (1)	40.138 (1)	4	Q
2	7	David Graf (SUI)	40.459 (1)	41.473 (2)	40.436 (3)	6	Q
3	278	Carlos Ramírez (COL)	42.164 (4)	41.620 (3)	40.801 (4)	11	Q
4	593	Alfredo Campo (ECU)	1:09.531 (6)	41.941 (4)	40.329 (2)	12	Q
5	117	Giacomo Fantoni (ITA)	41.576 (3)	42.766 (6)	40.979 (5)	14	
6	44	Anthony Dean (AUS)	1:00.186 (5)	42.750 (5)	42.251 (6)	16	

=== Semifinals ===
==== Heat 1 ====
Rank	#	Name	1st run	2nd run	3rd run	Total	Notes
1	100	Romain Mahieu (FRA)	40.265 (1)	40.293 (2)	40.244 (1)	4	Q
2	278	Carlos Ramírez (COL)	41.207 (4)	41.005 (4)	41.281 (2)	10	Q
3	3	Sylvain André (FRA)	40.695 (2)	40.490 (3)	1:09.511 (6)	11	Q
4	11	Connor Fields (USA)	40.762 (3)	40.270 (1)	DNF (8)	12	Q
5	143	Nicolás Torres (ARG)	41.693 (5)	41.014 (5)	41.360 (3)	13	
6	120	Vincent Pelluard (COL)	42.002 (6)	41.422 (6)	42.250 (5)	17	
7	921	Joris Harmsen (NED)	42.978 (7)	42.265 (7)	41.801 (4)	18	
8	1	Twan van Gendt (NED)	58.692 (8)	42.315 (8)	1:51.080 (7)	23	

==== Heat 2 ====
Rank	#	Name	1st run	2nd run	3rd run	Total	Notes
1	313	Niek Kimmann (NED)	39.981 (1)	40.023 (3)	39.352 (2)	6	Q
2	5	Kye Whyte (GBR)	40.769 (3)	40.076 (4)	39.299 (1)	8	Q
3	33	Joris Daudet (FRA)	41.141 (4)	39.629 (1)	39.924 (3)	8	Q
4	593	Alfredo Campo (ECU)	40.442 (2)	39.738 (2)	40.173 (4)	8	Q
5	7	David Graf (SUI)	41.645 (6)	1:15.178 (7)	40.462 (5)	18	
6	40	Tore Navrestad (NOR)	41.648 (7)	40.302 (5)	40.722 (6)	18	
7	500	Renato Rezende (BRA)	41.561 (5)	1:28.740 (8)	40.992 (7)	20	
8	24	Corben Sharrah (USA)	42.208 (8)	40.994 (6)	43.532 (8)	22	

=== Final ===
Rank	#	Name	Time
1st place, gold medalist(s)	313	Niek Kimmann (NED)	39.053
2nd place, silver medalist(s)	5	Kye Whyte (GBR)	39.167
3rd place, bronze medalist(s)	278	Carlos Ramírez (COL)	40.572
4	3	Sylvain André (FRA)	40.676
5	593	Alfredo Campo (ECU)	40.705
6	100	Romain Mahieu (FRA)	41.952
7	33	Joris Daudet (FRA)	DNF
8	11	Connor Fields (USA)	DNS

== See also ==
- Cycling at the 2020 Summer Olympics – Women's BMX racing
- Cycling at the 2020 Summer Olympics – Men's keirin
- Cycling at the 2020 Summer Olympics – Men's BMX freestyle
