= Switzerland at the 2015 European Games =

- IOC code: SUI
- NOC: Swiss Olympic Association
- Website: www.swissolympic.ch

in Baku, Azerbaijan 12 – 28 June 2015
- Competitors: 130
- Flag bearer: Giulia Steingruber
- Medals Ranked 13th: Gold 7 Silver 4 Bronze 4 Total 15

European Games appearances (overview)
- 2015; 2019; 2023; 2027

Switzerland competed at the 2015 European Games, in Baku, Azerbaijan from 12 to 28 June 2015.

== Medalists ==
Medal	Name	Sport	Event	Date
Gold	Nino Schurter	Cycling	Men's Cross country	13 June
Gold	Jolanda Neff	Cycling	Women's Cross country	13 June
Gold	Nicola Spirig	Triathlon	Women's	13 June
Gold	Nina Betschart; Nicole Eiholzer	Volleyball	Women's beach	20 June
Gold	Giulia Steingruber	Gymnastics	Women's vault	20 June
Gold	Giulia Steingruber	Gymnastics	Women's floor exercise	20 June
Gold	Heidi Diethelm Gerber	Shooting	Women's 25 metre pistol	20 June
Silver	Lukas Flückiger	Cycling	Men's Cross country	13 June
Silver	Kathrin Stirnemann	Cycling	Women's Cross country	13 June
Silver	Giulia Steingruber	Gymnastics	Women's artistic individual all-around	20 June
Silver	Sarah Hornung	Shooting	Women's 10 metre air rifle	16 June
Bronze	Fabian Giger	Cycling	Men's Cross country	13 June
Bronze	Giulia Steingruber	Gymnastics	Women's balance beam	20 June
Bronze	Ludovic Chammartin	Judo	Men's 60 kg	25 June
Bronze	David Graf	Cycling	Men's BMX	28 June

== Archery ==
Athlete	Event	Ranking round		Round of 64	Round of 32	Round of 16	Quarterfinals	Semifinals	Final / BM	
Athlete	Event	Score	Seed	Opposition Score	Opposition Score	Opposition Score	Opposition Score	Opposition Score	Opposition Score	Rank
Adrian Faber	Men's individual	641	47	Ivashko (Ukraine); L 4–6	Did not advance					33
Celine Schobinger	Women's individual	628	33	Zuranska (Poland); L 4–6	Did not advance					33
Iliana Deineko	Women's individual	600	56	Winter (Germany); L 0–6	Did not advance					33
Nathalie Dielen	Women's individual	594	58	Stepanova (Russia); L 3–7	Did not advance					33
Celine Schobinger; Iliana Deineko; Nathalie Dielen	Women's team	1822	15	—N/a		Russia L 2–6	Did not advance			9
Celine Schobinger; Adrian Faber	Mixed team	1269	20	—N/a		Did not advance				20

== Badminton ==
- Men's singles – Mathias Bonny
- Women's singles – Nicole Ankli
- Mixed doubles – Céline Burkart, Oliver Schaller

== Beach volleyball ==
- Men's – Sébastien Chevallier / Marco Krattiger, Alexei Strasser / Nico Beeler
- Women's – Nina Betschart / Nicole Eiholzer

== Boxing ==
- Men's 81 kg – Uke Smajli
- Women's 60 kg – Sandra Brügger
- Women's 64 kg – Anaïs Kistler

== Canoeing ==
- Men's 1000m and 5000m – Fabio Wyss

== Cycling ==
- BMX – Renaud Blanc, David Graf
- Mountain Bike – Lukas Flückiger, Fabian Giger, Nino Schurter, Katrin Leumann, Jolanda Neff, Kathrin Stirnemann
- Road Race – Lukas Jaun, Martin Kohler, Simon Pellaud, Patrick Schelling, Simon Zahner

== Fencing ==
- Men's Épée – Bruce Brunold, Georg Kuhn, Michele Niggeler, Florian Staub

== Gymnastics ==
=== Artistic ===
- Men's – Michael Meier, Taha Serhani, Eddy Yusof
- Women's – Caterina Barloggio, Jessica Diacci, Giulia Steingruber

=== Rhythmic ===
- Women's – Gina Dünser, Stephanie Kälin, Julia Novak, Lisa Rusconi, Tamara Stanisic, Nicole Turuani

=== Trampoline ===
Switzerland qualified two athlete based on the results at the 2014 European Trampoline Championships. The two male gymnasts competed in both the individual and the synchronized event.

- Men's – Simon Progin, Nicolas Schori
- Women's – Fanny Chilo, Sylvie Wirth

== Judo ==
- Men's 60 kg – Ludovic Chammartin
- Men's 90 kg – Ciril Grossklaus, Domenic Wenzinger
- Men's 100 kg – Flavio Orlik
- Women's 57 kg – Emilie Amaron, Larissa Csatari
- Women's 70 kg – Juliane Robra

== Karate ==
- Women's 68 kg – Elena Quirici

== Shooting ==
- Men's – Simon Beyeler, Claude-Alain Delley, Jan Lochbihler, Pascal Loretan, Fabio Ramella
- Women's – Heidi Diethelm Gerber, Sarah Hornung, Petra Lustenberger, Jasmin Mischler, Marina Schnider

== Taekwondo ==
- Women's 57 kg – Manuela Bezzola
- Women's 67 kg – Nina Kläy

== Triathlon ==
- Men's – Andrea Salvisberg
- Women's – Nicola Spirig

== Wrestling ==
Switzerland competed in wrestling.
