= Niek Kimmann =

Dutch BMX cyclist (born 1996)

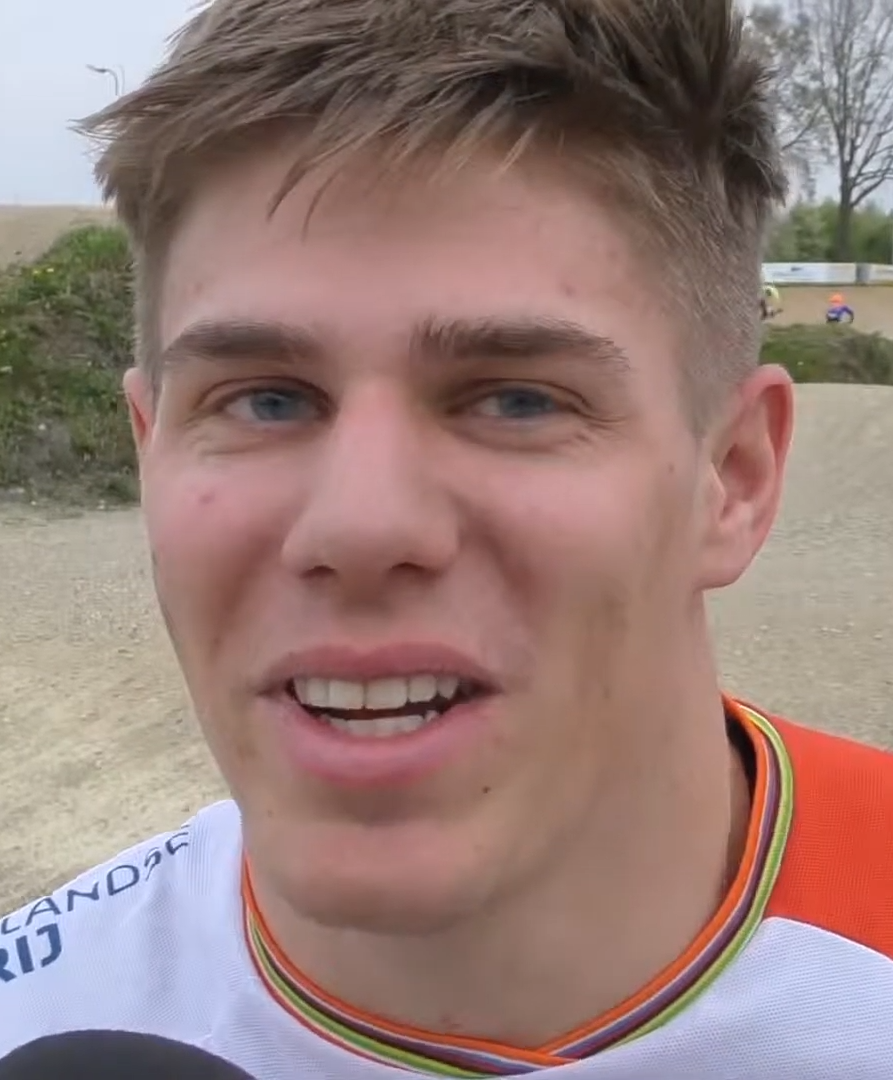
- Kimmann in 2019

Personal information
- Nationality: Netherlands
- Born: 20 May 1996 (age 30) Hardenberg, Netherlands

Sport
- Sport: Cycling
- Event: BMX racing
- Coached by: Liam Phillips
Medal record
Men's BMX racing
Representing Netherlands
Event	1st	2nd	3rd
Olympic Games	1	0	0
World Championships	3	4	0
World Junior Championships	2	0	1
World Cup	2	1	1
European Championships	3	0	0
European Junior Championships	1	0	1
National Championships	3	0	0
Total	15	5	3
Olympic Games
Gold medal – first place	2020 Tokyo	BMX racing
World Championships
Gold medal – first place	2015 Heusden-Zolder	BMX racing
Gold medal – first place	2016 Medellín	BMX time trial
Gold medal – first place	2021 Arnhem	BMX racing
Silver medal – second place	2015 Heusden-Zolder	BMX time trial
Silver medal – second place	2016 Medellín	BMX racing
Silver medal – second place	2019 Heusden-Zolder	BMX racing
Silver medal – second place	2024 Rock Hill	BMX racing
World Cup
Gold medal – first place	2018	BMX racing
Gold medal – first place	2019	BMX racing
Silver medal – second place	2015	BMX racing
Bronze medal – third place	2024	BMX racing
European Championships
Gold medal – first place	2019 Valmiera	BMX racing
Gold medal – first place	2023 Besançon	BMX racing
Gold medal – first place	2023 Besançon	BMX time trial (team)
World Junior Championships
Gold medal – first place	2014 Rotterdam	BMX racing
Gold medal – first place	2014 Rotterdam	BMX time trial
Bronze medal – third place	2013 Auckland	BMX time trial
European Junior Championships
Gold medal – first place	2014 Roskilde	BMX racing
Bronze medal – third place	2013	BMX racing
Dutch Championships
Gold medal – first place	2017 Assen	BMX racing
Gold medal – first place	2018 Uithoorn	BMX racing
Gold medal – first place	2019 Erp	BMX racing

Niek Kimmann (born 20 May 1996 in Lutten) is a Dutch BMX racing cyclist. Kimmann is the reigning Olympic Champion BMX Racing, a three-time World Champion, one-time European Champion, three-time Dutch Champion, and two-time World Cup winner. He is also a two-time junior World Champion.

== Career ==
Kimmann, born in Lutten., started BMXing at age seven, after attending a classmate's BMX training. At age 15, he joined the Dutch National Team at the Olympic Training Center in Papendal.

During the 2014 UCI BMX World Championships, Kimmann won the Junior World Title in both racing and time trial. In August 2014, together with Wiebe Scholten, he won a bronze medal in the team boys event at the 2014 Summer Youth Olympics.

He started racing in Elite in 2015. At Papendal, he won his first World Cup race and at the UCI BMX World Championships in Zolder, Belgium, Kimmann became World Champion at age 19. One day earlier, he won a silver medal in time trial. Kimmann became the second Dutch BMX World Champion, after Robert de Wilde, who won in 1999. As a reward for this season, Kimmann was one of the three nominees for Dutch Sportsman of the year, which was eventually won by short track speed skater Sjinkie Knegt.

In 2016, Kimmann finished 2nd, behind Joris Daudet at the World Championships in Medellín. A day earlier, he won the time trail, which meant he is the last World Champion in this discipline. At the 2016 Olympics he finished seventh. He fell in the quarter finals, injuring his ankle ligament and a metatarsal bone. He had to recover from his injuries between August 2016 and February 2017. The serious crash of his friend and fellow BMX-cyclist Jelle van Gorkom in January 2018 while the two were training made a deep impact on him.

In 2018 Kimmann won the World Cup, with four wins - and had to withdraw from the 2018 UCI BMX World Championships due to cramps. A year later he won the 2019 European BMX Championships. and successfully defended the World Cup with the highest point total (1180pts) in history, after winning six out of ten races.

In early 2021 Kimmann left the Dutch National Team in Papendal for The UCI World Cycling Centre in Aigle. He is now coached by former World Champion Liam Phillips. A few days before the 2020 Olympics, Kimmann crashed into a track official during a training lap around the BMX track, which resulted in a small fracture in his kneecap. On 30 July he won the Men's BMX gold medal starting from lane 8, ahead of Kye Whyte and Carlos Ramírez (BMX rider). After the Olympics he has confirmed that he'll continue BMX racing, but he doesn't rule out the possibility of joining the Dutch track cycling team in the future.

== Personal life ==
His younger brother, Justin Kimmann, is also a BMX rider and finished 8th in the Junior World Championships 2016.

== Trivia ==
- The Kimmann family has an indoor BMX track in a warehouse at their farm, which they use for training and shooting YouTube videos.
- During the COVID-19 quarantine period, Kimmann set the 'Garden World Hour Record' in his backyard with a distance of 20.1 km, beating GCN's 16.3 km.
- In the run-up to the 2020 Olympics, Kimmann and his partner Samsung developed FastFrame. A regular Meybo BMX-bicycle with built-in sensors. These sensors give real-time information to his coaches.
- After his gold Olympic medal, Kimmann received a royal insignia, which made him Knight Order of Orange-Nassau.
