= Joshua Callan =

Australian BMX rider (born 1991)

Personal information
- Born: 8 April 1991 (age 35) Melbourne, Australia
- Height: 192 cm (6 ft 4 in)
- Weight: 86 kg (190 lb)

Cycling career
- Sport: Cycling
- Current team: Australian EDS Team
- Discipline: BMX racing
- Role: Rider

Amateur team
- 2002: Australian Mighty 11s

Joshua Callan (born 8 April 1991) is an Australian male BMX rider, representing his nation at international competitions. He competed in the time trial event at the 2015 UCI BMX World Championships.

Callan was born on 8 April 1991 in Melbourne, Australia. When he was 11, he participated in the Mighty 11s tour, going to China, Canada, and Brazil. He won back to back world championships in 2002 and 2003. He graduated from Little Yarra Steiner School in Yarra Junction.

He became professional in 2008.
