= Justin Posey (BMX rider) =

American BMX rider

Personal information
- Born: November 17, 1993 (age 32)
- Height: 5 ft 11 in (180 cm)

Cycling career
- Sport: Cycling
- Current team: United States
- Discipline: BMX racing
- Role: Rider

Justin Posey (born November 17, 1993) is an American male BMX rider, representing his nation at international competitions. He competed in the time trial event at the 2015 UCI BMX World Championships.
