= Esteban Yaffar =

Bolivian BMX rider

Personal information
- Born: 28 October 1993 (age 32)

Cycling career
- Sport: Cycling
- Current team: Bolivia
- Discipline: BMX racing
- Role: Rider

Esteban Yaffar (born 28 October 1993) is a Bolivian male BMX rider, representing his nation at international competitions. He competed in the time trial event at the 2015 UCI BMX World Championships.
