= Miguel Calixto =

Colombian cyclist

Personal information
- Full name: Miguel Alejandro Calixto Lopez
- Born: 9 May 1994 (age 32)

Cycling career
- Sport: Cycling
- Discipline: BMX racing
- Role: Rider

Miguel Alejandro Calixto Lopez (born 9 May 1994) is a Colombian male BMX rider, representing his nation at international competitions. He competed in the time trial event at the 2015 UCI BMX World Championships.
