= Penias Tenthani =

Zimbabwean BMX rider (born 1996)

Personal information
- Born: 2 June 1996 (age 30)

Cycling career
- Sport: Cycling
- Current team: Zimbabwe
- Discipline: BMX racing
- Role: Rider

Penias Tenthani (born 2 June 1996) is a Zimbabwean male BMX rider, representing his nation at international competitions. He competed in the time trial event at the 2015 UCI BMX World Championships.
