= Vladyslav Sapozhnikov =

Ukrainian BMX rider

Personal information
- Born: 15 May 1994 (age 32)

Cycling career
- Sport: Cycling
- Current team: Ukraine
- Discipline: BMX racing
- Role: Rider

Vladyslav Sapozhnikov (born 15 May 1994) is a Ukrainian male BMX rider, representing his nation at international competitions. He competed in the time trial event at the 2015 UCI BMX World Championships.
