= Quillan Isidore =

British BMX rider

Personal information
- Born: 17 October 1996 (age 29) London, United Kingdom
- Height: 187 cm (6 ft 2 in)
- Weight: 80 kg (176 lb)

Cycling career
- Sport: Cycling
- Current team: Great Britain
- Discipline: BMX racing
- Role: Rider

Quillan Isidore (born 17 October 1996) is a British BMX rider, representing his nation at international competitions. He competed in the time trial event at the 2015 UCI BMX World Championships. In 2023, both Beth Shriever and Isidore kept their British Championship titles in the 2023 British BMX Championships against 44 other BMX champions.
