= Corey Frieswyk =

Australian BMX rider

Personal information
- Born: 26 January 1994 (age 32)

Cycling career
- Sport: Cycling
- Current team: Australia
- Discipline: BMX racing
- Role: Rider

Corey Frieswyk (born 26 January 1994) is an Australian male BMX rider, representing his nation at international competitions. He competed in the time trial event at the 2015 UCI BMX World Championships, but did not finish.
