= Maliek Byndloss =

Jamaican BMX rider (born 1995)

Personal information
- Born: 21 March 1995 (age 31)

Cycling career
- Sport: Cycling
- Discipline: BMX racing
- Role: Rider

Maliek Byndloss (born 21 March 1995) is a Jamaican male BMX rider, representing his nation at international competitions. He competed in the time trial event at the 2015 UCI BMX World Championships.

In 2015, he won the Jamaican National BMX Championship.
