= Giacomo Fantoni =

Italian BMX cyclist

Giacomo Frantoni
Personal information
- Nationality: Italian
- Born: 18 March 1991 (age 34); Zevio, Italy
- Height: 173 cm (5 ft 8 in)
- Weight: 75 kg (165 lb)

Sport
- Sport: Cycling
- Event: BMX

Giacomo Frantoni (born 18 March 1991 in Zevio) is an Italian national champion BMX cyclist.

== Personal life ==
He was born in Zevio. His first coaches were Ludivic Laurent and his mother Linda Spiazzi, who represented Italy in downhill mountain biking at the world championships in the 1990s.

== Career ==
He was selected in the Italian team for the Cycling at the 2020 Summer Olympics – Men's BMX racing. He went into the Games as a double Italian national champion.
