= Thomas Zula =

American BMX rider

Personal information
- Nickname: Tommy
- Born: March 11, 1992 (age 34)

Cycling career
- Sport: Cycling
- Current team: United States
- Discipline: BMX racing
- Role: Rider

Thomas Zula (born March 11, 1992) is an American male BMX rider, representing his nation at international competitions. He competed in the time trial event at the 2015 UCI BMX World Championships.
