= Viesturs Morozs =

Latvian BMX rider

Personal information
- Nickname: The Giant
- Born: 18 February 1990 (age 36) Riga, Latvia

Cycling career
- Sport: Cycling
- Current team: StayStrong
- Discipline: BMX racing
- Role: Rider

Viesturs Morozs (born 18 February 1990 in Riga) is a Latvian male BMX rider, representing his nation at international competitions. He competed in the time trial event at the 2015 UCI BMX World Championships. In the 2016 UEC European championships he became European vice-champion. He finished 5th in the 2018 UCI BMX World Championships. In 2018 Morozs won the UEC European Cup overall ranking in Men 25+ category. He is representing Stay Strong World Team colours. His nickname on the European tracks is "The Giant".
