= Brandon Reid (BMX rider) =

Canadian BMX rider (born 1994)

Personal information
- Born: 18 March 1994 (age 32)

Cycling career
- Sport: Cycling
- Current team: Canada
- Discipline: BMX racing
- Role: Rider

Brandon Reid (born 18 March 1994) is a Canadian male BMX rider, representing his nation at international competitions. He competed in the time trial event at the 2015 UCI BMX World Championships.
