= Helvijs Babris =

Latvian BMX cyclist (born 1998)

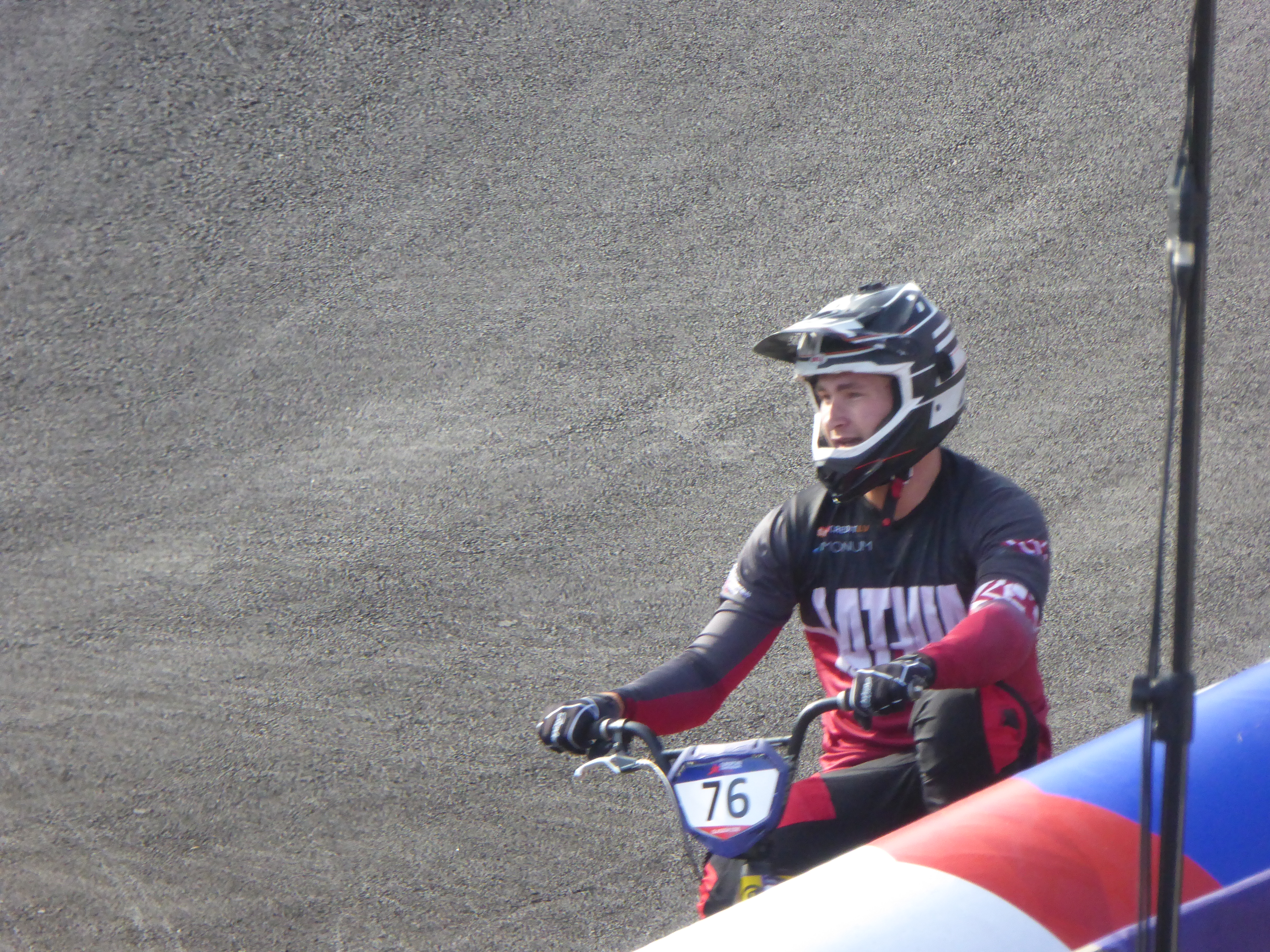
- Babris in 2018

Personal information
- Nationality: Latvia
- Born: 13 May 1998 (age 28) Taurene

Sport
- Sport: Cycling
- Event: BMX racing

Helvijs Babris (born 13 May 1998) is a Latvian BMX cyclist.

A multiple national champion, he uses the Training Center for High-Class Athletes (AKSSC) in Valmiera. He was selected in the Latvian team for the Cycling at the 2020 Summer Olympics – Men's BMX racing. He finished twentieth overall but did not progress to the semi-finals. He was voted the sportsman of the year by the city of Valmiera in 2021.

He has also represented Latvia in bobsleigh at Europe Cup level.
