= Martijn Jaspers =

Dutch male BMX rider

Personal information
- Born: 11 February 1987 (age 39)

Cycling career
- Sport: Cycling
- Current team: Netherlands
- Discipline: BMX racing
- Role: Rider

Martijn Jaspers (born 11 February 1987) is a Dutch male BMX rider, representing his nation at international competitions. He competed in the time trial event at the 2015 UCI BMX World Championships.
