= Mark Link =

Dutch BMX rider (born 1995)

Personal information
- Born: 27 February 1995 (age 31)

Cycling career
- Sport: Cycling
- Current team: Netherlands
- Discipline: BMX racing
- Role: Rider

Mark Link (born 27 February 1995) is a Dutch male BMX rider, representing his nation at international competitions. He competed in the time trial event at the 2015 UCI BMX World Championships.
