= Leonardo Caze Dos Santos Neto =

Brazilian BMX rider

Leonardo Cazé dos Santos Neto
Personal information
- Born: 2 June 1996 (age 30)

Cycling career
- Sport: Cycling
- Discipline: BMX racing
- Role: Rider

Leonardo Cazé dos Santos Neto (born 2 June 1996) is a Brazilian male BMX rider, representing his nation at international competitions. He competed in the time trial event at the 2015 UCI BMX World Championships.
