= Daniel Franks (BMX rider) =

New Zealand BMX rider

Personal information
- Born: 2 October 1993 (age 33) Christchurch, New Zealand

Cycling career
- Sport: Cycling
- Current team: New Zealand
- Discipline: BMX racing
- Role: Rider
Medal record
Men's BMX racing
Representing New Zealand
World Junior Championships
Bronze medal – third place	2010 Pietermaritzburg	BMX cruiser

Daniel Franks (born 2 October 1993) is a New Zealand male BMX rider, representing his nation at international competitions. He competed in the time trial event at the 2015 UCI BMX World Championships.
