= Bradley Game =

Australian BMX rider

Personal information
- Born: 8 November 1995 (age 30)

Cycling career
- Sport: Cycling
- Current team: Australia
- Discipline: BMX racing
- Role: Rider

Bradley Game (born 8 November 1995) is an Australian male BMX rider, representing his nation at international competitions. He competed in the time trial event at the 2015 UCI BMX World Championships.
