= Jared Garcia =

American BMX rider

Personal information
- Born: 6 December 1982 (age 43)

Cycling career
- Sport: Cycling
- Current team: United States
- Discipline: BMX racing
- Role: Rider

Jared Garcia (born 6 December 1982) is an American male BMX rider, representing his nation at international competitions. He competed in the time trial event at the 2015 UCI BMX World Championships.
