= Kohei Yoshii =

Japanese BMX rider

Personal information
- Born: 14 March 1995 (age 31)

Cycling career
- Sport: Cycling
- Current team: Japan
- Discipline: BMX racing
- Role: Rider

Kohei Yoshii (吉井 康平, Yoshii Kōhei; born 14 March 1995) is a Japanese male BMX rider, representing his nation at international competitions. He competed in the time trial event at the 2015 UCI BMX World Championships.
