= Kai Sakakibara =

Australian BMX rider

Personal information
- Born: 29 July 1996 (age 30) Gold Coast, Queensland

Cycling career
- Sport: Cycling
- Current team: Australia
- Discipline: BMX racing
- Role: Rider

Kai Sakakibara (born 29 July 1996) is an Australian male BMX rider, representing his nation at international competitions.

He competed in the time trial event at the 2015 UCI BMX World Championships.

Kai crashed at a World Cup event in Bathurst, Australia in 2020, suffering a life-changing brain injury.

== Personal life ==
His sister Saya Sakakibara is also a BMX racer, who won gold at the 2024 Paris Olympics.
