= Rogerio Dos Reis =

Brazilian BMX rider

Rogerio dos Reis
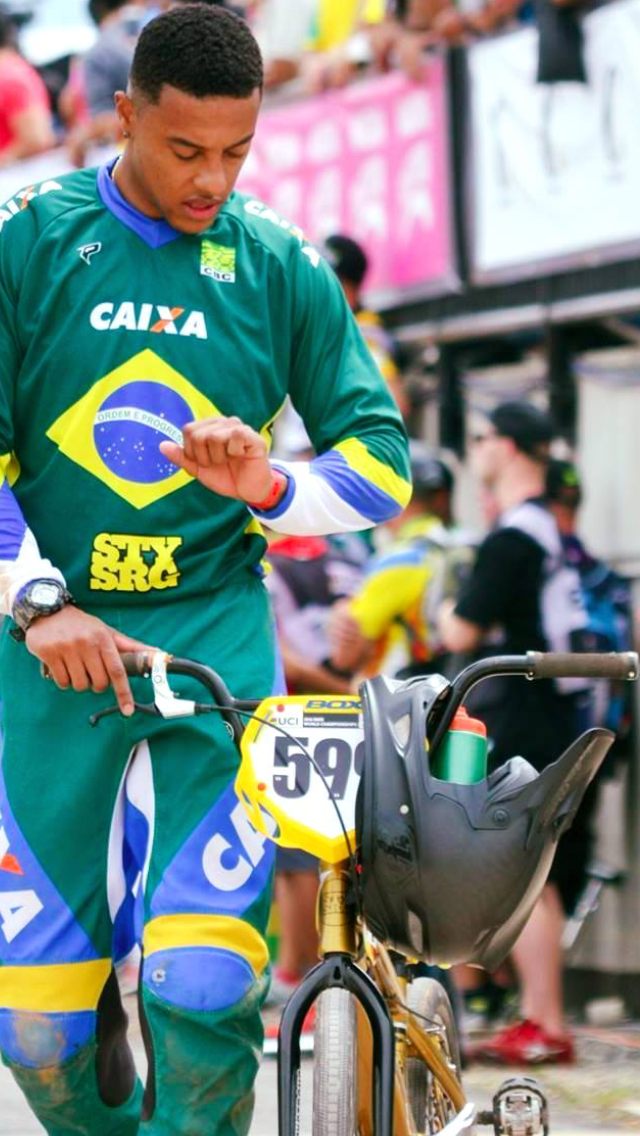

Personal information
- Born: 17 March 1992 (age 34)

Cycling career
- Sport: Cycling
- Discipline: BMX racing
- Role: Rider

Rogerio dos Reis (born 17 March 1992) is a Brazilian male BMX rider, representing his nation at international competitions. He was Brazilian champion in 2013. He competed in the time trial event at the 2015 UCI BMX World Championships.

- Brazilian champion in 2013
- 2º Place Pan Americano 2014 - Quito/Ecuador
