= Feddison Flanders =

Aruban BMX rider (born 1994)

Personal information
- Full name: Feddison Akeem Flanders
- Nickname: Freddy
- Born: 19 January 1994 (age 32) Aruba
- Height: 1.80 m (5 ft 11 in)

Cycling career
- Sport: Cycling
- Discipline: BMX racing
- Role: Rider
- Rider type: Elite Men

Feddison Flanders (born 19 January 1994) is an Aruban male BMX rider, representing his nation at international competitions. He competed in the time trial event at the 2015 UCI BMX World Championships.
