= Steven Cisar =

American cyclist

Personal information
- Nickname: Ceez
- Born: September 9, 1986 (age 40) Los Angeles, California

Cycling career
- Sport: Cycling
- Discipline: BMX racing
- Role: Rider

Professional team

Steven Cisar (born September 9, 1986) is an American male BMX rider, representing his nation at international competitions. He competed in the time trial event at the 2015 UCI BMX World Championships.
