= Bence Bujaki =

Hungarian BMX rider

Personal information
- Born: 25 September 1993 (age 33)

Cycling career
- Sport: Cycling
- Discipline: BMX racing
- Role: Rider

Bence Bujaki (born 25 September 1993) is a Hungarian male BMX rider, representing his nation at international competitions. He competed in the time trial event at the 2015 UCI BMX World Championships. Le bogosse
