= Julian Schmidt (BMX rider) =

German BMX rider

Personal information
- Born: 10 December 1994 (age 31)

Cycling career
- Sport: Cycling
- Current team: Germany
- Discipline: BMX racing
- Role: Rider

Julian Schmidt (born 10 December 1994) is a German male BMX rider, representing his nation at international competitions. He competed in the time trial event at the 2015 UCI BMX World Championships.
