= Trent Jones (BMX rider) =

New Zealand BMX rider

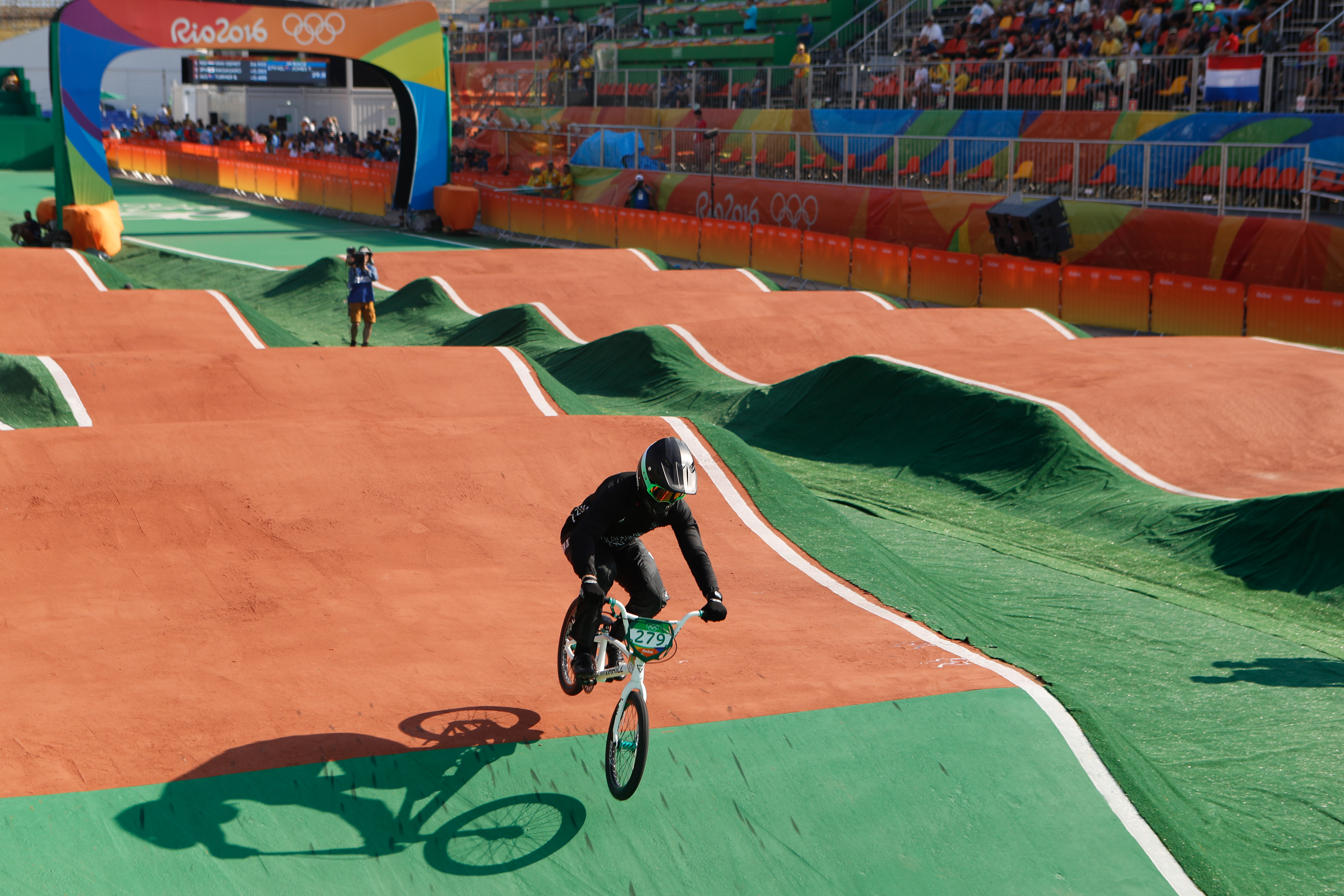
- Jones training at the Olympic BMX Center in Rio de Janeiro

Personal information
- Born: 12 August 1994 (age 32)

Cycling career
- Sport: Cycling
- Current team: New Zealand
- Discipline: BMX racing
- Role: Rider

Trent Jones (born 12 August 1994) is a New Zealand male BMX rider, representing his nation at international competitions. He competed in the time trial event at the 2015 UCI BMX World Championships.
