= Jan Švub =

Czech BMX rider

Personal information
- Born: 20 February 1990 (age 36) Jeseník, Czechoslovakia

Cycling career
- Sport: Cycling
- Current team: Czech Republic
- Discipline: BMX racing
- Role: Rider

Jan Švub (born 20 February 1990) is a Czech male BMX rider, representing his nation at international competitions. He competed in the time trial event at the 2015 UCI BMX World Championships.
