= Kyle Dodd =

South African cyclist

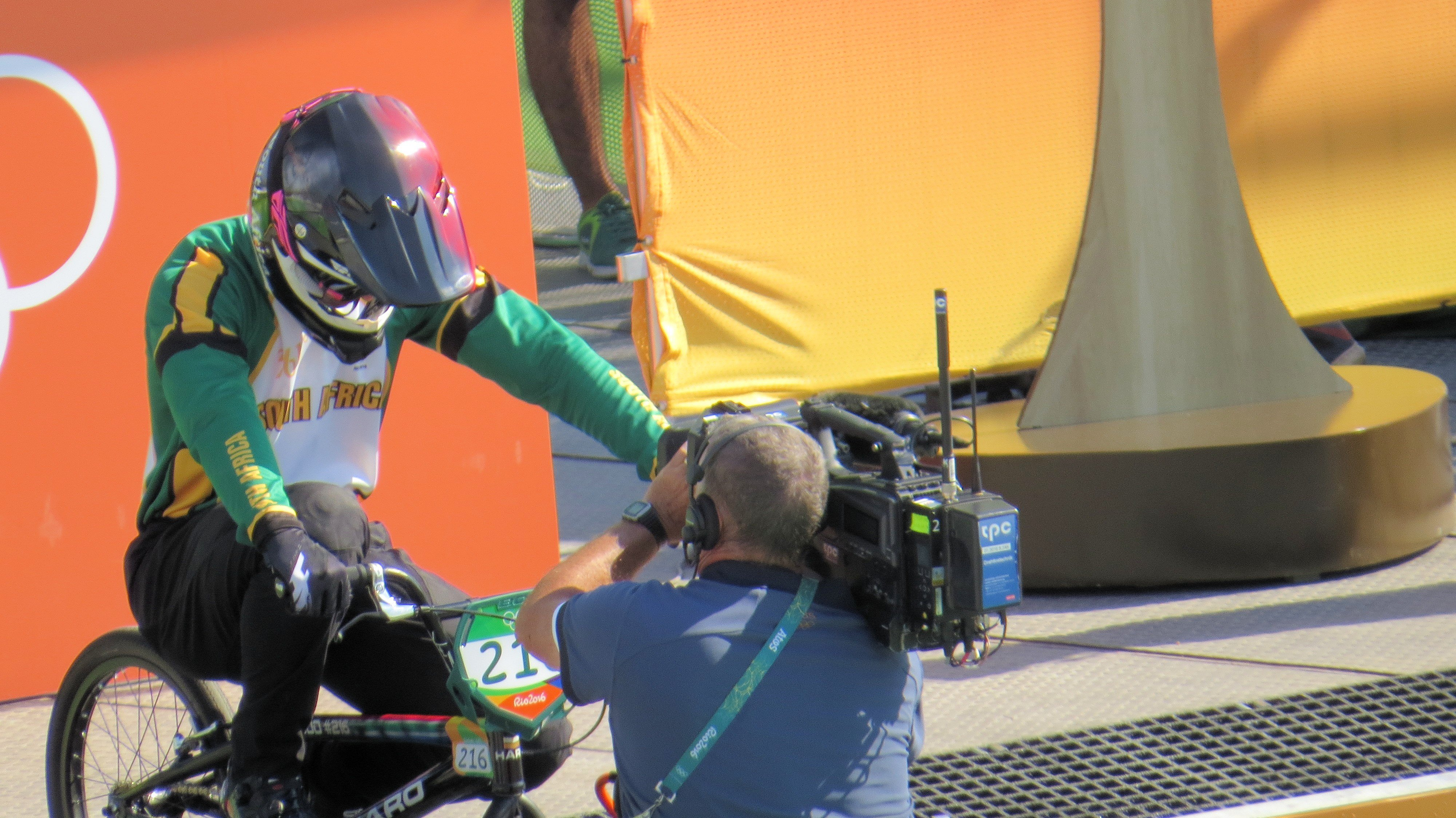
- Dodd during the Summer Olympic Games 2016

Personal information
- Born: 11 February 1994 (age 32) Johannesburg, South Africa
- Height: 178 cm (5 ft 10 in)
- Weight: 80 kg (176 lb)

Cycling career
- Sport: Cycling
- Discipline: BMX
- Role: Rider

Kyle Dodd (born 11 February 1994) is a South African BMX cyclist. He competed in the men's BMX at the 2016 Summer Olympics. He finished 6th in his heat during the quarterfinals and did not advance to the semifinals.
