= Dave van der Burg =

Dutch BMX rider (born 1993)

Personal information
- Born: 10 July 1993 (age 33) Heesch, Netherlands

Cycling career
- Sport: Cycling
- Current team: Netherlands
- Discipline: BMX racing
- Role: Rider

Dave van der Burg (born 10 July 1993 in Heesch) is a Dutch male BMX rider, representing his nation at international competitions. He competed in the time trial event at the 2015 UCI BMX World Championships. He joined the Dutch national team in 2016, and managed to qualify himself for the 2020 Summer Olympics in Tokyo.

== Career ==
Van der Burg started racing on a small BMX bike at the age of six years. In his first year, he competed in local races and won most of them. In the years to follow, he started to compete in national and international races. Winning several championships in the early stages of his career, and three second places at the Dutch, European and World Championships in 2013 confirmed his talent and Van der Burg made the step to the pinnacle level of BMX Racing - Elite Men.

After a few years in the privateer team, Verlu BMX, and becoming Dutch champion in 2016 he is now a member of the Dutch National team and training full time at the Olympic Training Centre in Papendal, the Netherlands.
