= Joris Harmsen =

Dutch cyclist

Personal information
- Born: 26 November 1992 (age 33)

Cycling career
- Sport: Cycling
- Current team: Netherlands
- Discipline: BMX racing
- Role: Rider

Joris Harmsen (born 26 November 1992) is a Dutch male BMX rider, representing his nation at international competitions. He competed in the time trial event at the 2015 UCI BMX World Championships.
