= Romain Riccardi =

Italian BMX rider

Personal information
- Born: 26 July 1988 (age 38)

Cycling career
- Sport: Cycling
- Current team: Italy
- Discipline: BMX racing
- Role: Rider

Romain Riccardi (born 26 July 1988) is an Italian male BMX rider, representing his nation at international competitions. He competed in the time trial event at the 2015 UCI BMX World Championships.
