= Kristens Krīgers =

Latvian BMX rider (born 1996)

Personal information
- Born: 25 August 1996 (age 30)

Cycling career
- Sport: Cycling
- Current team: Latvia
- Discipline: BMX racing
- Role: Rider

Kristens Krīgers (born 25 August 1996) is a Latvian male BMX rider, representing his nation at international competitions. He competed in the time trial event at the 2015 UCI BMX World Championships.
