= Kristaps Veksa =

Latvian BMX rider

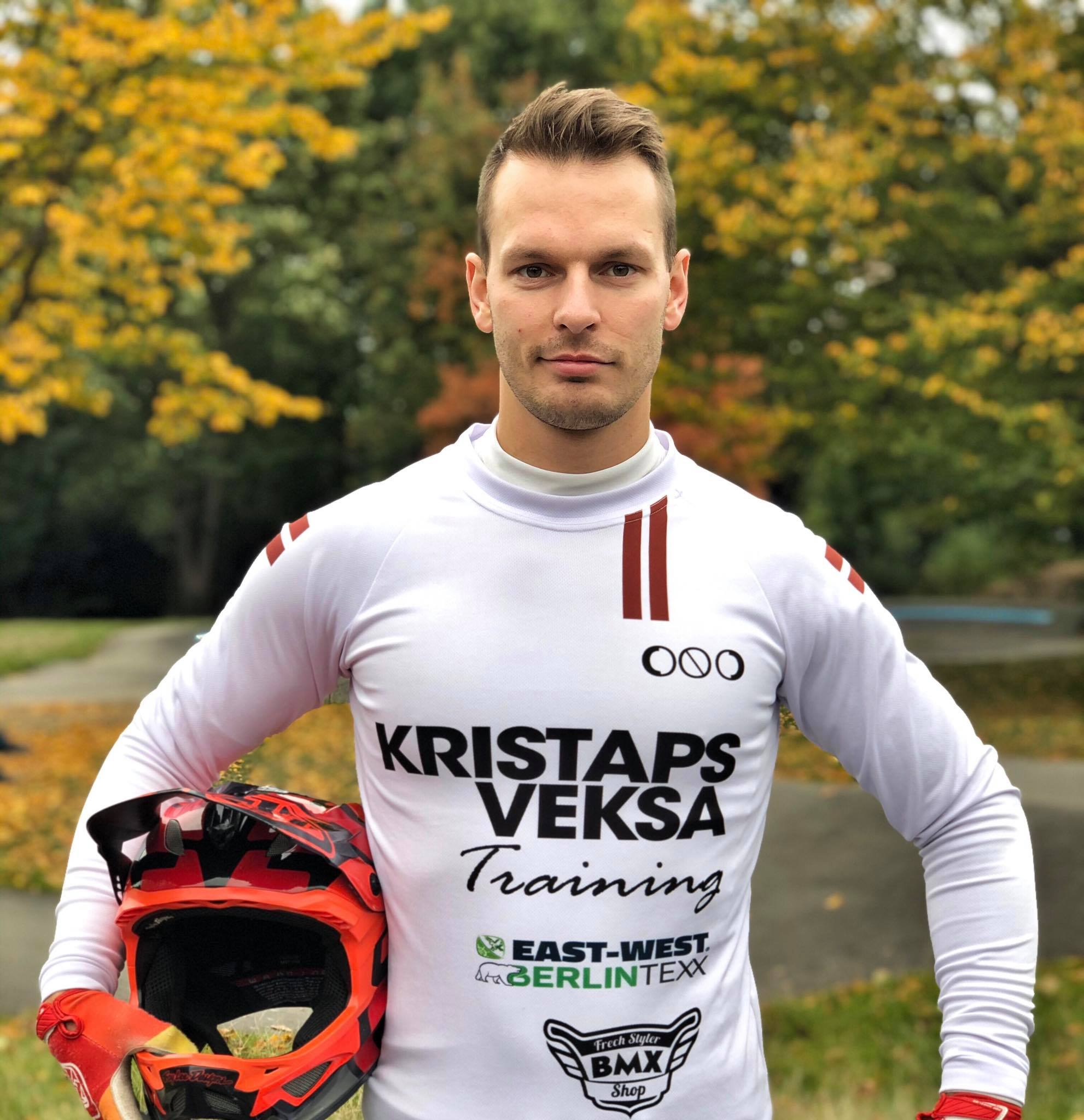

Personal information
- Nickname: Skinnijs
- Born: 30 January 1994 (age 32) Saldus, Latvia
- Height: 174 cm (5 ft 9 in)
- Weight: 75 kg (165 lb)

Cycling career
- Sport: Cycling
- Current team: Veksa training
- Discipline: BMX racing
- Role: Rider and Trainer
- Rider type: Track speed specialist

Professional team
- Meybo - Bensink UCI WORLD BMX TRADE TEAM Monum Latvia KRISTAPS VEKSA TRAINING

Major wins
- BMX World Challenge Champion (Men 25-29) 2023

Kristaps Veksa (born 30 January 1994) is a Latvian male BMX rider, representing his nation at international competitions. He started to race BMX at 1999. In 2023 Kristaps became a BMX World Challenge Champion (Men 25–29 years old)

At the moment he is a BMX Trainer in Germany and also compete in international events like BMX and Pumptrack World championship races. In 2021 He was also first time competing in Ninja Warrior Germany and Ninja Warrior All Stars.

== Best results (since 1999) ==
1st in Latvian Championship Multiple times

2002 - 2nd place European Championship round Netherland (Boys 8)

2002 - 3rd place European Championships (Boys 8)

2004 - 7th place European Championships (Boys 10)

2010 - 2nd place European Championships (Boys 16)

2012 - 1st place Euro Cup Round in Switzerland (Junior Men)

2013 - 4th place Euro Cup Round Latvia (Elite men)

2016 - 3rd place Euro cup round Germany (Elite men)

2016 - 3rd place European Cup Overall (Elite Men)

2016 - 6th place European Championships TT (Elite men)

2021 - Ninja Warrior Germany Semi Finalist

2021 - 1st place Red Bull UCI Pump Track Belgium Qualifier

2021 - 6th place Red Bull UCI Pump Track World Championships

2022 - Ninja Warrior Germany All Star Participant

2022 - European Championships 5th place (Men 25–29)

2022 - 1st place Red Bull UCI Pump Track Czech Worlds Qualifier

2022 - 11th place Red Bull UCI Pump Track World Championships Chile

2023 - 1st place European cup round Belgium, Zolder (Men 25–29)

2023 - 1st place UCI Cycling World Championships - BMX Racing in Glasgow (Men 25–29)

2024 - 1st place UCI Pump Track Belgium, Genk Worlds Qualifier

2025 - 1st place UCI Pump Track Belgium, Worlds Qualifier

2025 - European Championships 2nd place (Men 30–34)

2025 - 8th place UCI Pump Track World Championships Switzerland

== Best Trainer results (Since 2018) ==
World Championships 2023 - 2nd (C. Wiesner) (Cruiser Women 40+)

European Championships 2023 - 1st (C. Wiesner) (Cruiser Women 40+)

European Cup Final 2nd & 3rd (M. Dubinskis)

European Cup Final 5th (Boys 16) (S. Nötzel)

European Cup final 6th (T. Ernins)

European Cup final 7th (T. Plath)

German National Champion (K. Jachens)

German National Silver & Bronze (S. Nötzel)

Latvian National Champion (M. Dubinskis)

German National Champion (E. Wachtel)

German National Bronze (M. König)

German National Bronze (I. Henke)
