= Renaud Blanc =

Swiss BMX rider

Personal information
- Born: 3 January 1991 (age 35) Geneva, Switzerland

Cycling career
- Sport: Cycling
- Current team: Switzerland
- Discipline: BMX racing
- Role: Rider

Renaud Blanc (born 3 January 1991) is a Swiss male BMX rider, representing Switzerland at international competitions. He competed in the time trial event at the 2015 UCI BMX World Championships.
