= Luis Brethauer =

German racing cyclist (born 1992)

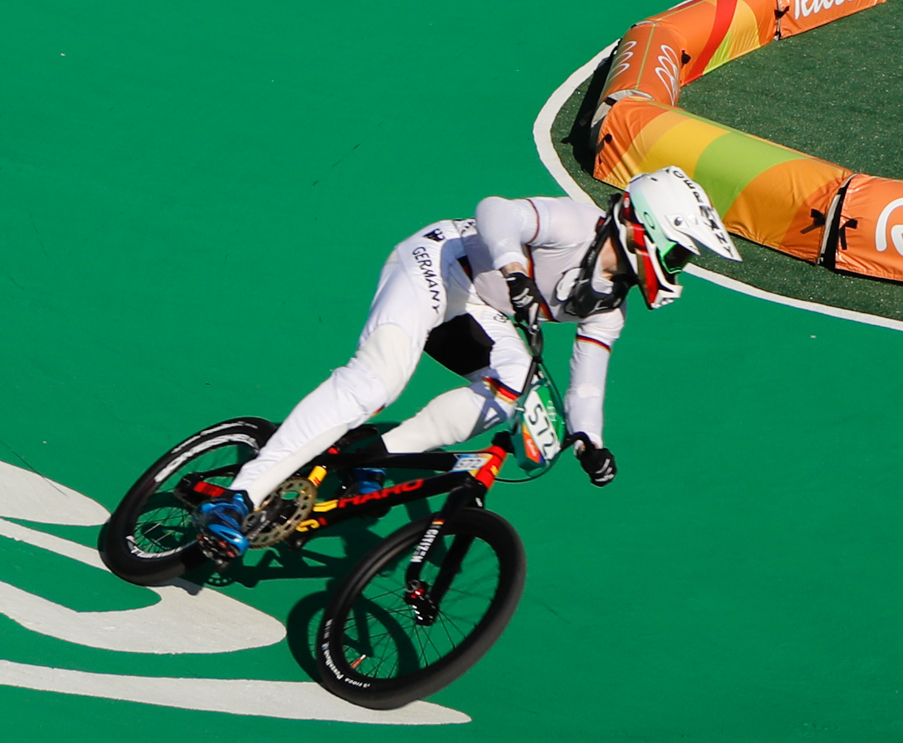
- Brethauer at the 2016 Summer Olympics

Personal information
- Born: 14 September 1992 (age 34) Aschaffenburg, Germany

Cycling career
- Sport: Cycling
- Current team: TSV Betzingen
- Discipline: BMX
- Role: Rider

Amateur team
- 2009–: German National Team
Medal record
Men's BMX
Representing Germany
German National Championships
6-times national Champion	2015
Olympiс Games
Participation	2012
European Games
Participation (Semi-final)	2015

Luis Brethauer (born 14 September 1992 in Aschaffenburg) is a German racing cyclist who represents Germany in BMX.

Luis Brethauer is a so-called sports soldier (German Bundeswehr). He takes part as TSV Betzingen in Air BMX team. His sport career started in 2000. His first international championship happened in 2003 (European Championships in Klatovy), where he finished third. In the German Championships 2010, he was vice-winner. In 2011 Brethauer took his first noble ranking as 10th in the European Championship in Haaksbergen. He was also 10th at the World Championships in Copenhagen.

In 2012 he won his first national title at the World Championships 2012 in Birmingham. Even though he was 49th in the final race of the European Championships in Orléans, he reached the final at the 6th Place. One of his biggest international successes in the World Cup (Supercross) 2012 is the 6th place in the Super Time Trial in Papendal and the 12th in the Super Time Trial in Randa mountain. With his teammate, Maik Baier, Brethauer participated in 2012 Summer Olympics in London, where he became the 1st German Olympic athlete in BMX cycling in general, both retired from there in the quarterfinals.

In 2015 Luis Brethauer has reached Semi-final of the '1st European Games' in Baku. July 2015 became very successful for Luis as he won the Time Trial in German National Championships and took the title of German Champion in 6th times.

Brethauer's biggest success was recorded at the BMX World Championships 2013 in Auckland. After a good performance, he reached the final and won the bronze medal. He had to admit defeat to the British Liam Phillips and the New Zealander Marc Willers.
