= Tore Navrestad =

Norwegian cyclist

Personal information
- Born: 19 February 1996 (age 30) Oslo, Norway

Cycling career
- Sport: Cycling
- Discipline: BMX racing
- Role: Rider

Tore Navrestad (born 19 February 1996) is a Norwegian male BMX rider, representing his nation at international competitions. He competed in the time trial event at the 2015 UCI BMX World Championships.
