= Jelle van Gorkom =

Dutch cyclist (born 1991)

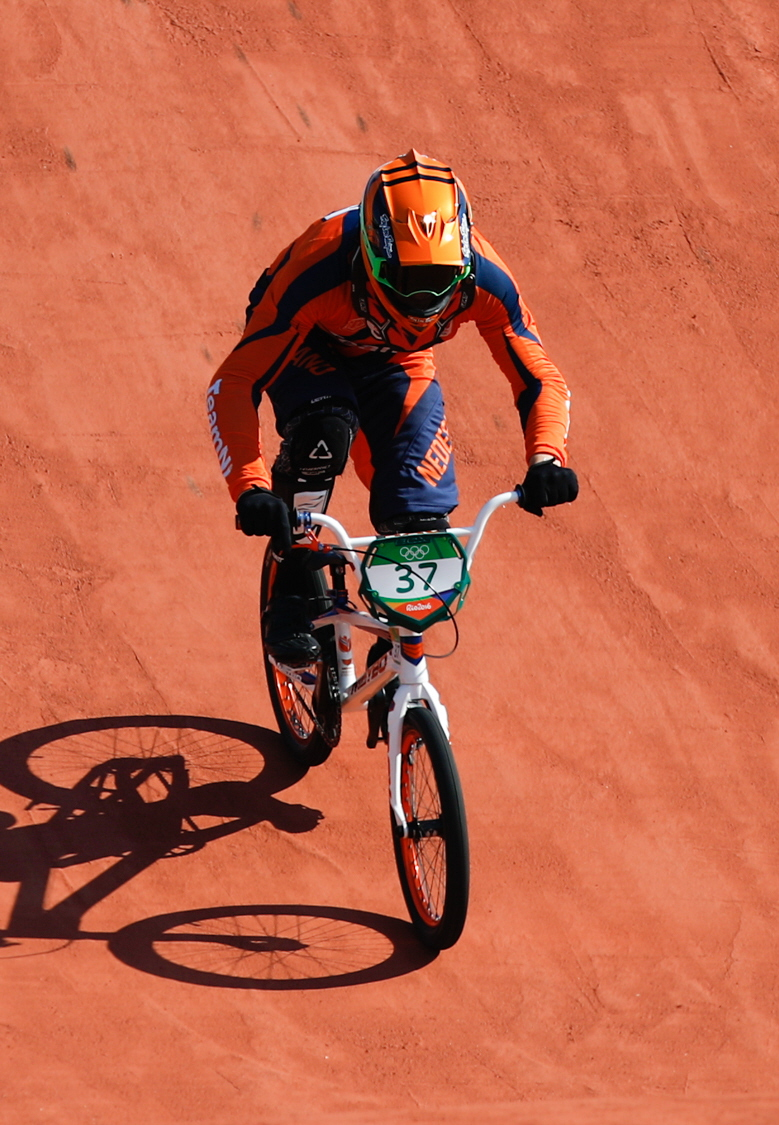
- Van Gorkom at the 2016 Summer Olympics

Personal information
- Nationality: Dutch
- Born: 5 January 1991 (age 35) Doetinchem, Netherlands

Sport
- Country: Netherlands
- Sport: Cycling
- Event: BMX racing
Medal record
Men's BMX racing
Representing Netherlands
Event	1st	2nd	3rd
Olympic Games	0	1	0
World Championships	0	2	0
World Junior Championships	0	0	1
World Cup	0	1	0
European Junior Championships	1	1	1
Total	1	5	2
Olympic Games
Silver medal – second place	2016 Rio de Janeiro	BMX racing
World Championships
Silver medal – second place	2011 Copenhagen	BMX time trial
Silver medal – second place	2015 Heusden-Zolder	BMX racing
World Cup
Silver medal – second place	2013	BMX racing
World Junior Championships
Bronze medal – third place	2008 Taiyuan	BMX cruiser
European Junior Championships
Gold medal – first place	2009	BMX racing
Silver medal – second place	2008	BMX cruiser
Bronze medal – third place	2008	BMX racing

Jelle van Gorkom (born 5 January 1991 in Doetinchem) is a Dutch racing cyclist and Olympic silver medalist who represents the Netherlands in BMX racing. He was selected to represent the Netherlands at the 2012 Summer Olympics in London in the men's BMX event, and went on to win the silver medal in the same event four years later at the 2016 Olympics in Rio.

On 9 January 2018, Van Gorkom suffered a serious crash in training at the National Sports Centre Papendal near Arnhem. He suffered damage to his skull, spleen, kidneys and liver, as well as broken ribs and a facial fracture, and went into a coma. On 13 January, the Royal Dutch Cycling Union (KNWU) announced that Van Gorkom was no longer receiving sleep medication, meaning "he must wake up from the coma on his own". On 22 January, KNWU officials said that he had awoken from the coma, but cautioned that the rider still faced a long rehabilitation.

== See also ==
- List of Dutch Olympic cyclists
