= David Graf (BMX rider) =

Swiss BMX rider (born 1989)

Personal information
- Nationality: Swiss
- Born: 8 September 1989 (age 37) Winterthur, Switzerland
- Cycling career
- Sport: Cycling
- Current team: Switzerland
- Discipline: BMX racing
- Role: Rider

Sport

UCI BMX racing World Cup career
- Starts: 19
- Championships: 0
- Wins: 0
- Podiums: 3
- Best finish: 2nd in 2016
Medal record
Men's BMX racing
Representing Switzerland
Event	1st	2nd	3rd
World Championships	0	0	2
World Cup	0	1	1
European Games	0	0	1
European Championships	0	1	1
Total	0	2	5
World Championships
Bronze medal – third place	2015 Heusden-Zolder	BMX racing
Bronze medal – third place	2021 Arnhem	BMX racing
World Cup
Silver medal – second place	2016	BMX racing
Bronze medal – third place	2019	BMX racing
European Games
Bronze medal – third place	2015 Baku	BMX racing
European Championships
Silver medal – second place	2016 Verona	BMX racing
Bronze medal – third place	2016 Verona	BMX time trial

David Graf (born 8 September 1989) is a Swiss male BMX rider, representing his nation at international competitions. He won the bronze medal at the 2015 European Games. He competed at world championships, inclusive the 2009, 2011, 2012 and 2015 UCI BMX World Championships, winning the bronze medal in the 2015 men's race.
