= Anthony Dean (cyclist) =

Australian BMX rider

Personal information
- Nickname: Deano
- Born: 22 April 1991 (age 35) Adelaide, South Australia
- Height: 175 cm (5 ft 9 in)
- Weight: 85 kg (187 lb)

Cycling career
- Sport: Cycling
- Discipline: BMX racing
- Role: Rider
Medal record
Men's BMX racing
Representing Australia
World Cup
Silver medal – second place	2014	BMX racing
Silver medal – second place	2020	BMX racing
World Junior Championships
Bronze medal – third place	2009 Adelaide	BMX racing

Anthony Dean (born 22 April 1991) is an Australian BMX cyclist. He qualified for the 2016 Summer Olympics & The 2020 Tokyo Olympics and competed in the men's BMX Racing.

== Early years ==
Born in Adelaide, South Australia, Dean first started competing in BMX as a 7-year-old. He was very focused and with intense practice excelled in the National Series and National Championships.

In 2013, Dean got his first chance at competing on the World Circuit. In 2014 he achieved his first World Cup medal and finished second overall in the World Cup rankings.

== Achievements ==
Dean was nominated as a reserve for the London 2012 Olympics team, He climbed into the top ten in the world leading into the Rio 2016 Olympics. However, in early 2016 his Olympic dreams were almost shattered when he broke his collarbone during a training session. Fortunately, after surgery, he made a quick recovery. He was able to compete in the season's opening World Cup event.

At the Rio 2016 Olympics, Dean moved through the quarter-finals as the highest ranked rider. He won each of his three semi-final races and joined teammate Sam Willoughby in the final. Unfortunately Dean couldn't match his earlier feats and finished eighth.

Dean, originally from Australia, now presently lives in San Diego, California. Dean has been a top threat contender in the men's elite BMX since 2012. During the 2018 UCI BMX World Championships he became a recipient of the bronze medal.

Dean likes to listen hip hop and is influenced by Sam Willoughby.
