= National Sports Centre Papendal =

Olympic training center of the Netherlands

Coordinates: 52°0′33″N 5°49′15″E

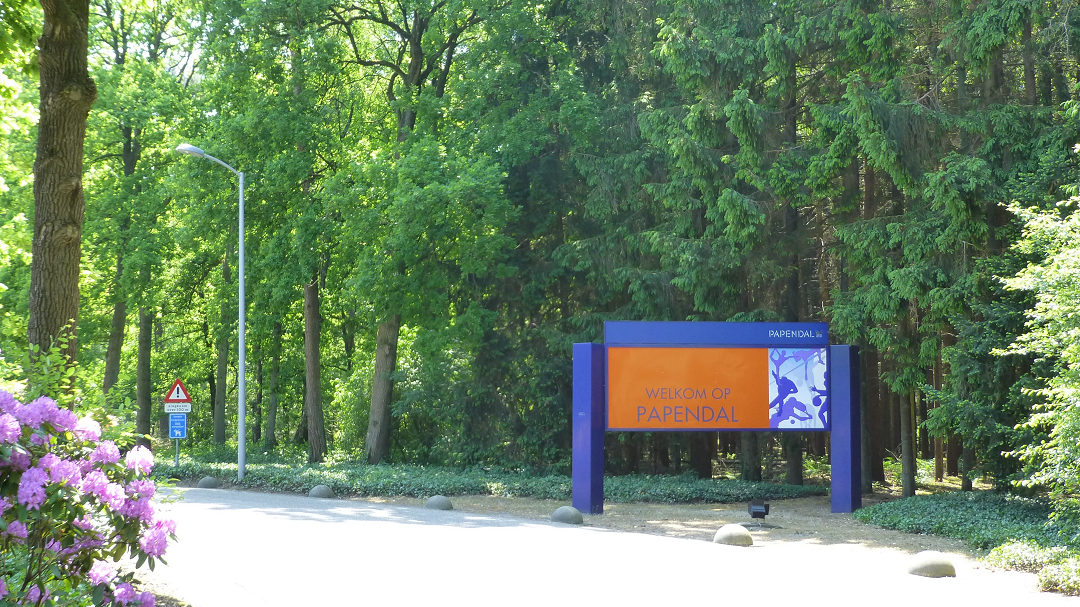
Entrance of Olympic Training Centre Papendal

Olympic Training Centre Papendal (Dutch: [ˈpaːpənˌdɑl]) is the national training centre of the Netherlands, located in the Veluwe woods 8 kilometres (5.0 mi) from Arnhem. Papendal is the home base of NOC*NSF and football club SBV Vitesse. The soccer fields are also being used as training ground by Vitesse's first team squad. Around 550 top athletes use the facilities of Papendal, 400 on a daily basis. With over 20 building projects in 10 years time, the Olympic Training Centre is completely modernized.

== History Olympic Training Centre Papendal ==
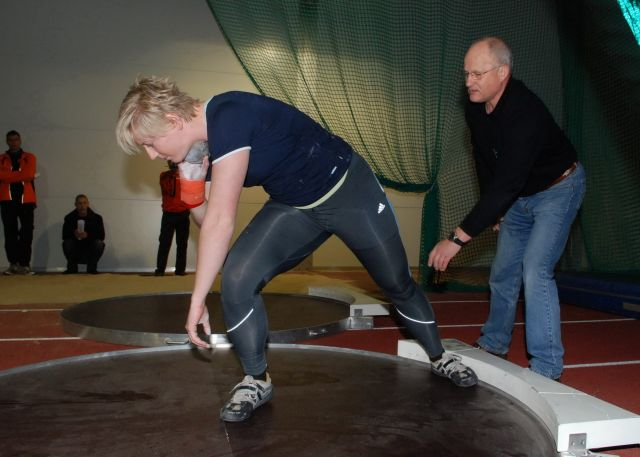
Coach Dieter Kollark giving instruction to German athlete Petra Lammert on shot put training, within the indoor facilities at the National Sports Centre Papendal

In 1959 the Dutch Sports Federation was founded. One of the topics that were addressed during a meeting of the Dutch Sports Federation (NSF) was how Dutch sports could become bigger. The idea for a national High Performance Centre from which all the affiliated sports federations of the NSF could profit was introduced. In 1963 the NSF bought woodlands from the City of Arnhem covering 93,5 hectares, this was expanded to 123 hectares in 1963. Princess Beatrix opened High Performance Centre Papendal in 1971. At the opening, the grounds consisted of a main building with restaurant, a sports hotel, a sports hall, a few grass pitches, a temporary centre for sports medicine, an athletics track and a lab for scientific research of surfaces with and without grass.

In 1980 the Olympics for disabled people took place in Arnhem. Part of the games took place at Papendal. On 21 June, Princess Margriet opened the Olympics for disabled (currently known as the Paralympic Games).

2013: Demerging of High Performance Centre Papendal from the NOC*NSF, private company High Performance Centre Papendal B.V. was founded.

== Facilities ==
Nowadays around 550 athletes use the facilities of the Olympic Training Centre, 400 on a daily basis. In March 2009 Papendal became one of four Centres for Elite Sports and Education (CTO). At a CTO athletes can train, study and live on one location. In 2013 the Arnhemhall was opened, a multifunctional training location. The Arnhemhall consists of two big team sport halls, two strength rooms, a boxing hall, an athletics multi event hall, a sprinthal, coacharea and a restaurant.

Papendal has a sports hotel, where young athletes that train fulltime at Papendal, have their own room. Also, since 2013, the training centre has living facilities off site, at four kilometres from Papendal.

=== Overview facilities ===
Outdoor	Indoor
Athletics track	Arnhemhall
BMX-track	Boxing rings
Event area	Strength rooms
Archery track	Sports halls
MTB Rock garden	Ruskahall
Tennis courts	Sporthall West
Soccer fields	Sprinthall
Golf Courses	Shooting hall

== Sustainability ==
Sustainability was an important topic during the modernization of Papendal. 70% of all buildings on site is connected to a system for cold-heat storage; the sources are 120m deep. With this system buildings are provided with sustainable energy. During summer the cold groundwater is used to cool building, while warmth is saved in the ground for heating during winter periods. In 2016 1270 solar panels were placed on the roof of the Arnhemhall. These panels provide 1/3rd of the facility with power.

== Organizations based at Papendal ==
A lot of sports related organizations are based at Papendal. For example NOC*NSF, football club Vitesse, the Athletics Federation and depandanced of ROC Rijn IJssel en de HAN University of Applied Sciences. In total around 850 people work at Papendal.

Papendal also features a four star Hotel. A lot of business meetings and congresses are being held here. In addition a lot of athletes stay at hotel during training sessions or training camps at Papendal.

== See also ==
- Netherlands at the Olympics
