= 2015 UCI BMX World Championships =

- Venue: Heusden-Zolder, Belgium
- Date(s): 21–25 July 2015
- Events: 8

The 2015 UCI BMX World Championships were the twentieth edition of the UCI BMX World Championships, which took place in Heusden-Zolder, Belgium, and crowned world champions in the cycling discipline of BMX racing.

== Medal summary ==
=== Elite events ===
Event	Gold	Silver	Bronze
Men's events
Men's race	Niek Kimmann; Netherlands	Jelle van Gorkom; Netherlands	David Graf; Switzerland
Men's time trial	Joris Daudet; France	Niek Kimmann; Netherlands	Connor Fields; United States
Women's events
Women's race	Stefany Hernández; Venezuela	Caroline Buchanan; Australia	Simone Christensen; Denmark
Women's time trial	Mariana Pajón; Colombia	Alise Post; United States	Sarah Walker; New Zealand

=== Junior events ===
Event	Gold	Silver	Bronze
Men's junior events
Men's junior race	Nicolás Torres; Argentina	Collin Hudson; United States	Romain Racine; France
Men's junior time trial	Shane Rosa; Australia	Brandon Te Hiko; Australia	Collin Hudson; United States
Women's junior events
Women's junior race	Axelle Étienne; France	Svetlana Admakina; Russia	Kelsey Van Ogle; United States
Women's junior time trial	Axelle Étienne; France	Ruby Huisman; Netherlands	Natalia Afremova; Russia

== Medal table ==
* Host nation (Belgium)

Rank	Nation	Gold	Silver	Bronze	Total
1	France (FRA)	3	0	1	4
2	Netherlands (NED)	1	3	0	4
3	Australia (AUS)	1	2	0	3
4	Argentina (ARG)	1	0	0	1
4	Colombia (COL)	1	0	0	1
4	Venezuela (VEN)	1	0	0	1
7	United States (USA)	0	2	3	5
8	Russia (RUS)	0	1	1	2
9	Denmark (DEN)	0	0	1	1
9	New Zealand (NZL)	0	0	1	1
9	Switzerland (SUI)	0	0	1	1
Totals (11 entries)		8	8	8	24
