= 2015 UCI BMX World Championships – Women's race =

Women's race at the 2015 UCI BMX World Championships
- Venue: Heusden-Zolder, Belgium
- Date: 25 July 2015
- Competitors: 28

Medalists
gold medal	Stefany Hernández	Venezuela
silver medal	Caroline Buchanan	Australia
bronze medal	Simone Christensen	Denmark

The Women's race event of the 2015 UCI BMX World Championships was held on 25 July 2015.

== Results ==
=== Motos ===
Heat	Rank	Name	Nation	Time	Note
1	1	Sarah Walker	New Zealand	38.528 (1)	Q
1	2	Dana Sprengers	Netherlands	39.561 (2)	Q
1	3	Lauren Reynolds	Australia	40.442 (3)	Q
1	4	Rachel Jones	Australia	40.593 (4)	Q
1	5	Teagan O'Keeffe	South Africa	40.791 (5)	
2	1	Elke Vanhoof	Belgium	37.663 (1)	Q
2	2	Merle van Benthem	Netherlands	38.648 (2)	Q
2	3	Charlotte Green	United Kingdom	39.156 (3)	Q
2	4	Priscilla Carnaval	Brazil	40.645 (4)	Q
2	5	Vilma Rimšaitė	Lithuania	41.212 (5)	
3	1	Magalie Pottier	France	39.856 (1)	Q
3	2	Simone Christensen	Denmark	39.917 (2)	Q
3	3	Doménica Azuero	Ecuador	40.920 (3)	Q
3	4	Bianca Quinalha	Brazil	41.561 (4)	Q
3	5	Sandie Thibaut	France	43.166 (5)	
3	6	Ketlin Tekkel	Estonia	46.907 (6)	
4	1	Natalia Suvorova	Russia	38.904 (1)	Q
4	2	Aneta Hladíková	Czech Republic	39.789 (2)	Q
4	3	Sandra Aleksejeva	Latvia	40.362 (3)	Q
4	4	Amanda Carr	Thailand	40.487 (4)	Q
4	5	Amelia Walsh	Canada	40.738 (5)	
4	6	Sarah Harvey	Australia	42.639 (6)	
5	1	Danielle George	United States	40.240 (1)	Q
5	2	Nadja Pries	Germany	40.324 (2)	Q
5	3	Mathilde Doudoux	France	41.024 (3)	Q
5	4	Haruka Seko	Japan	42.947 (4)	Q
5	5	Gabriela Díaz	Argentina	43.235 (5)	
5	6	Melinda McLeod	Australia	50.759 (6)	

==== Quarter finals ====
Heat	Rank	Name	Nation	Time	Gap	Note
1	1	Caroline Buchanan	Australia	38.397	—N/a	Q
1	2	Mariana Pajón	Colombia	38.397	0	Q
1	3	Magalie Pottier	France	39.026	+0.629	Q
1	4	Merle van Benthem	Netherlands	39.539	+1.142	Q
1	5	Bianca Quinalha	Brazil	41.078	+2.681	
1	6	Dana Sprengers	Netherlands	41.253	+2.856	
1	7	Priscilla Carnaval	Brazil	42.040	+3.643	
2	1	Alise Post	United States	38.372	—N/a	Q
2	2	Simone Christensen	Denmark	38.754	+0.382	Q
2	3	Felicia Stancil	United States	39.160	+0.788	Q
2	4	Elke Vanhoof	Belgium	39.472	+1.100	Q
2	5	Lauren Reynolds	Australia	40.217	+1.845	
2	6	Rachel Jones	Australia	40.362	+1.990	
2	7	Mathilde Doudoux	France	40.438	+2.066	
3	1	Sarah Walker	New Zealand	38.829	—N/a	Q
3	2	Brooke Crain	United States	39.664	+0.835	Q
3	3	Aneta Hladíková	Czech Republic	40.289	+1.460	Q
3	4	Charlotte Green	United Kingdom	40.820	+1.991	Q
3	5	Amanda Carr	Thailand	41.071	+2.242	
3	6	Natalia Suvorova	Russia	41.431	+2.602	
3	7	Haruka Seko	Japan	41.927	+3.098	
4	1	Stefany Hernández	Venezuela	38.436	—N/a	Q
4	2	Laura Smulders	Netherlands	38.727	+0.291	Q
4	3	Doménica Azuero	Ecuador	39.517	+1.081	Q
4	4	Danielle George	United States	39.831	+1.395	Q
4	5	Nadja Pries	Germany	40.540	+2.104	
4	6	Sandra Aleksejeva	Latvia	41.242	+2.806	

==== Semi finals ====
Heat	Rank	Name	Nation	Time	Gap	Note
1	1	Caroline Buchanan	Australia	37.955	—N/a	Q
1	2	Brooke Crain	United States	38.106	+0.151	Q
1	3	Stefany Hernández	Venezuela	38.271	+0.316	Q
1	4	Simone Christensen	Denmark	38.553	+0.598	Q
1	5	Doménica Azuero	Ecuador	39.291	+1.336	
1	6	Magalie Pottier	France	39.723	+1.768	
1	7	Elke Vanhoof	Belgium	39.902	+1.947	
1	8	Charlotte Green	United Kingdom	40.498	+2.543	
2	1	Alise Post	United States	37.933	—N/a	Q
2	2	Felicia Stancil	United States	39.067	+1.134	Q
2	3	Aneta Hladíková	Czech Republic	39.896	+1.963	Q
2	4	Laura Smulders	Netherlands	41.112	+3.179	Q
2	5	Sarah Walker	New Zealand	57.955	+20.022	
2	6	Merle van Benthem	Netherlands	2:20.111	+1:42.178	
2	7	Mariana Pajón	Colombia	DNF		
2	8	Danielle George	United States	DNF		

==== Final ====
Rank	Name	Nation	Time	Gap
1st place, gold medalist(s)	Stefany Hernández	Venezuela	37.530	
2nd place, silver medalist(s)	Caroline Buchanan	Australia	38.745	+1.215
3rd place, bronze medalist(s)	Simone Christensen	Denmark	39.068	+1.538
4	Brooke Crain	United States	39.102	+1.572
5	Laura Smulders	Netherlands	39.643	+2.113
6	Aneta Hladíková	Czech Republic	39.696	+2.166
7	Felicia Stancil	United States	44.400	+6.870
8	Alise Post	United States	1:19.599	+42.069
