= 2015 UCI BMX World Championships – Women's time trial =

Women's time trial at the 2015 UCI BMX World Championships
- Venue: Heusden-Zolder, Belgium
- Date: 24 July 2015
- Competitors: 36 (1 did not start)

Medalists
gold medal	Mariana Pajón	Colombia
silver medal	Alise Post	United States
bronze medal	Sarah Walker	New Zealand

The Women's time trial event of the 2015 UCI BMX World Championships was held on 24 July 2015.

== Results ==
=== Qualification ===
Rank	Name	Nation	Time	Gap	Note
1	Mariana Pajón	Colombia	35.741		Q
2	Caroline Buchanan	Australia	36.238	+0.497	Q
3	Alise Post	United States	36.544	+0.803	Q
4	Merle van Benthem	Netherlands	36.587	+0.846	Q
5	Sarah Walker	New Zealand	36.627	+0.886	Q
6	Simone Christensen	Denmark	36.731	+0.990	Q
7	Felicia Stancil	United States	36.839	+1.098	Q
8	Stefany Hernández	Venezuela	36.853	+1.112	Q
9	Laura Smulders	Netherlands	37.224	+1.483	Q
10	Elke Vanhoof	Belgium	37.230	+1.489	Q
11	Danielle George	United States	37.444	+1.703	Q
12	Aneta Hladíková	Czech Republic	37.691	+1.950	Q
13	Nadja Pries	Germany	37.839	+2.098	Q
14	Natalia Suvorova	Russia	37.845	+2.104	Q
15	Brooke Crain	United States	37.910	+2.169	Q
16	Magalie Pottier	France	37.927	+2.186	Q
17	Dana Sprengers	Netherlands	38.113	+2.372	
18	Lauren Reynolds	Australia	38.335	+2.594	
19	Charlotte Green	United Kingdom	38.466	+2.725	
20	Doménica Azuero	Ecuador	38.556	+2.815	
21	Sandra Aleksejeva	Latvia	38.665	+2.924	
22	Gabriela Díaz	Argentina	38.693	+2.952	
23	Melinda McLeod	Australia	38.705	+2.964	
24	Amanda Carr	Thailand	38.931	+3.190	
25	Sandie Thibaut	France	38.953	+3.212	
26	Vilma Rimšaitė	Lithuania	38.972	+3.231	
27	Rachel Jones	Australia	38.989	+3.248	
28	Teagan O'Keeffe	South Africa	39.103	+3.362	
29	Priscilla Carnaval	Brazil	39.292	+3.551	
30	Bianca Quinalha	Brazil	39.429	+3.688	
31	Amelia Walsh	Canada	39.756	+4.015	
32	Mathilde Doudoux	France	39.871	+4.130	
33	Haruka Seko	Japan	39.928	+4.187	
34	Sarah Harvey	Australia	40.458	+4.717	
35	Ketlin Tekkel	Estonia	47.005	+11.264	
-	Anna Sara Rojas	Bolivia	DNS		

=== Super final ===
Rank	Name	Nation	Time	Gap
1st place, gold medalist(s)	Mariana Pajón	Colombia	35.518	
2nd place, silver medalist(s)	Alise Post	United States	35.926	+0.408
3rd place, bronze medalist(s)	Sarah Walker	New Zealand	36.365	+0.847
4	Laura Smulders	Netherlands	36.693	+1.175
5	Stefany Hernández	Venezuela	36.723	+1.205
6	Brooke Crain	United States	36.817	+1.299
7	Elke Vanhoof	Belgium	37.075	+1.557
8	Magalie Pottier	France	37.230	+1.712
9	Caroline Buchanan	Australia	37.238	+1.720
10	Felicia Stancil	United States	37.533	+2.015
11	Natalia Suvorova	Russia	37.599	+2.081
12	Danielle George	United States	37.800	+2.282
13	Nadja Pries	Germany	38.037	+2.519
14	Aneta Hladíková	Czech Republic	38.138	+2.620
15	Simone Christensen	Denmark	46.301	+10.783
16	Merle van Benthem	Netherlands	1:30.221	+54.703
