= 2015 in cycle sport =

== BMX racing ==
=== BMX World Cup ===
- April 18 – September 26: 2015 UCI BMX Supercross World Cup
  - April 18 & 19: World Cup #1 in (United Kingdom) Manchester
    - Men's Time Trial winner: (United Kingdom) Liam Phillips
    - Men's Race winner: (United Kingdom) Liam Phillips
    - Women's Time Trial winner: (Colombia) Mariana Pajón
    - Women's Race winner: (Australia) Caroline Buchanan
  - May 9 & 10: World Cup #2 in (Netherlands) Papendal
    - Men's Time Trial winner: (United States) Connor Fields
    - Men's Race winner: (Netherlands) Niek Kimmann
    - Women's Time Trial winner: (Colombia) Mariana Pajón
    - Women's Race winner: (Colombia) Mariana Pajón
  - August 15 & 16: World Cup #3 in (Sweden) Ängelholm
    - Men's Time Trial winner: (Australia) Sam Willoughby
    - Men's Race winner: (United Kingdom) Liam Phillips
    - Women's Time Trial winner: (Colombia) Mariana Pajón
    - Women's Race winner: (United States) Alise Post
  - September 5 & 6: World Cup #4 in (Argentina) Santiago del Estero
    - Men's Time Trial winner: (United States) Connor Fields
    - Men's Race winner: (United Kingdom) Liam Phillips
    - Women's Time Trial winner: (Colombia) Mariana Pajón
    - Women's Race winner: (Colombia) Mariana Pajón
  - September 25 & 26: World Cup #5 (final) in (United States) Rock Hill, South Carolina
    - Men's Time Trial winner: (Netherlands) Niek Kimmann
    - Men's Race winner: (Latvia) Māris Štrombergs
    - Women's Time Trial winner: (Colombia) Mariana Pajón
    - Women's Race winner: (Colombia) Mariana Pajón

=== BMX UEC European Cup ===
- April 3 – October 18: BMX Cycling UEC European Cup 2015
  - April 3 & 4: European Cup #1 in (Belgium) Heusden-Zolder
    - Men's Race #1 winner: (United States) Connor Fields
    - Men's Race #2 winner: (Netherlands) Niek Kimmann
    - Men's Junior Race #1 winner: (Netherlands) Justin Kimmann
    - Men's Junior Race #2 winner: (France) Romain Racine
    - Women's Race #1 winner: (United States) Felicia Stancil
    - Women's Race #2 winner: (Venezuela) Stefany Hernández
    - Women's Junior Race #1 winner: (France) Axelle Etienne
    - Women's Junior Race #2 winner: (France) Axelle Etienne
  - May 1 – 3: European Cup #2 in (France) Messigny-et-Vantoux
    - Men's Race #1 winner: (France) Amidou Mir
    - Men's Race #2 winner: (Netherlands) Niek Kimmann
    - Men's Junior Race #1 winner: (Netherlands) Justin Kimmann
    - Men's Junior Race #2 winner: (France) Romain Racine
    - Women's Race #1 winner: (Venezuela) Stefany Hernández
    - Women's Race #2 winner: (Venezuela) Stefany Hernández
    - Women's Junior Race #1 winner (Switzerland) Louanne Juillerat
    - Women's Junior Race #2 winner: (Switzerland) Louanne Juillerat
  - June 5–7: European Cup #3 in (Denmark) Bjerringbro
    - Men's Race #1 winner: (Netherlands) Twan van Gendt
    - Men's Race #2 winner: (Netherlands) Niek Kimmann
    - Men's Junior Race #1 winner: (France) Romain Racine
    - Men's Junior Race #2 winner: (France) Romain Racine
    - Women's Race #1 winner: (Venezuela) Stefany Hernández
    - Women's Race #2 winner: (Venezuela) Stefany Hernández
    - Women's Junior Race #1 winner: (Russia) Yaroslava Bondarenko
    - Women's Junior Race #2 winner: (Russia) Yaroslava Bondarenko
  - September 18–20: European Cup #4 in (Switzerland) Échichens
    - Men's Race #1 winner: (Latvia) Edžus Treimanis
    - Men's Race #2 winner: (Switzerland) David Graf
    - Men's Junior Race #1 winner: (Switzerland) Bastien Claessens
    - Men's Junior Race #2 winner: (Germany) Philip Schaub
    - Women's Race #1 winner: (Belgium) Elke Vanhoof
    - Women's Race #2 winner: (Belgium) Elke Vanhoof
    - Women's Junior Race #1 winner: (France) Axelle Etienne
    - Women's Junior Race #2 winner: (France) Axelle Etienne
  - October 16–18: European Cup #5 (final) in (United Kingdom) Manchester

==== Regional events ====
- March 22: BMX Cycling COPACI North American Championships 2015 in (United States) Rock Hill, South Carolina
  - Men's Junior Race winner: (United States) Collin Hudson
  - Men's Race winner: (United States) Connor Fields
  - Women's Junior Race winner: (United States) Kelsey Van Ogle
  - Women's Race winner: (United States) Alise Post
- April 30: BMX Cycling OCC Oceanian Championships 2015 in (Australia) Brisbane
  - Men's Junior Race winner: (Australia) Joshua McLean
  - Men's Race winner: (Australia) Max Cairns
  - Women's Junior Race winner: (New Zealand) Zoe Fleming
  - Women's Race winner: (Australia) Lauren Reynolds
- May 23: BMX Cycling COPACI South American Championships in (Chile) Santiago
  - Men's Junior Race winner: (Argentina) Exequiel Torres
  - Men's Race winner: (Colombia) Carlos Oquendo
  - Women's Junior Race winner: (Colombia) Maria Paulina Osorno Calderon
  - Women's Race winner: (Colombia) Mariana Pajón
- May 24: BMX Cycling COPACI American Championships 2015 in (Chile) Santiago
  - Men's Junior Race winner: (Brazil) Leandro Noronha
  - Men's Race winner: (Brazil) Renato Rezende
  - Women's Junior Race winner: (Colombia) Maria Paulina Osorno Calderon
  - Women's Race winner: (Colombia) Mariana Pajón
- July 10–12: BMX Cycling UEC European Championships 2015 in (Netherlands) Erp
  - Men's Race winner: (Netherlands) Twan van Gendt
  - Men's Junior Race winner: (Belgium) Mathijs Verhoeven
  - Women's Race winner: (Belgium) Elke Vanhoof
  - Women's Junior Race winner: (France) Axelle Etienne
- October 31 – November 1: Asian BMX Championships in (Myanmar) Naypyitaw
  - Men's Race winner: (Japan) Yoshitaku Nagasako
  - Men's Junior Race winner: (Japan) Daichi Yamaguchi
  - Women's Race winner: (Thailand) Amanda Mildred Carr
  - Women's Junior Race winner: (Philippines) Sienna Fines

=== BMX World Championships and Test Event ===
- July 21–25: 2015 UCI BMX World Championships in (Belgium) Heusden-Zolder
  - Men's Elite winner: (Netherlands) Niek Kimmann
  - Women's Elite winner: (Venezuela) Stefany Hernández
  - Junior Men's winner: (Argentina) Exequiel Torres
  - Junior Women's winner: (France) Axelle Etienne
  - Men's Elite Time Trial winner: (France) Joris Daudet
  - Women's Elite Time Trial winner: (Colombia) Mariana Pajón
  - Junior Men's Time Trial winner: (Australia) Shane Rosa
  - Junior Women's Time Trial winner: (France) Axelle Etienne
  - Masters' winner: (Republic of Ireland) Kelvin Batey
- October 3 & 4: Aquece Rio International BMX Challenge 2015 in Brazil (Olympic Test Event)
  - Men's Elite winner: (Latvia) Edžus Treimanis
  - Women's Elite winner: (Colombia) Mariana Pajón
  - Junior Men's winner: (Argentina) Exequiel Torres
  - Junior Women's winner: (France) Axelle Etienne (default)

== Cyclo-cross biking ==
=== UCI Cyclo-cross World Cup ===
- October 19, 2014 – January 25, 2015: 2014–2015 UCI Cyclo-cross World Cup
  - October 19, 2014: World Cup #1 in (Netherlands) Valkenburg aan de Geul
    - Men's Elite winner: (Netherlands) Lars van der Haar
    - Women's Elite winner: (United States) Katie Compton
  - November 22, 2014: World Cup #2 in (Belgium) Koksijde
    - Men's Elite winner: (Belgium) Wout van Aert
    - Women's Elite winner: (Belgium) Sanne Cant
  - November 29, 2014: World Cup #3 in (United Kingdom) Milton Keynes
    - Men's Elite winner: (Belgium) Kevin Pauwels
    - Women's Elite winner: (Belgium) Sanne Cant
  - December 21, 2014: World Cup #4 in (Belgium) Namur
    - Men's Elite winner: (Belgium) Kevin Pauwels
    - Women's Elite winner: (Czech Republic) Kateřina Nash
  - December 26, 2014: World Cup #5 in (Belgium) Heusden-Zolder
    - Men's Elite winner: (Netherlands) Lars van der Haar
    - Women's Elite winner: (Netherlands) Marianne Vos
  - January 25, 2015: World Cup #6 (final) in (Netherlands) Hoogerheide
    - Men's Elite winner: (Netherlands) Mathieu van der Poel
    - Women's Elite winner: (Italy) Eva Lechner

=== UCI Cyclo-cross World Championships ===
- January 31 & February 1: 2015 UCI Cyclo-cross World Championships in (Czech Republic) Tábor
  - Men's Elite winner: (Netherlands) Mathieu van der Poel
  - Women's Elite winner: (France) Pauline Ferrand-Prévot
  - Men's U23 winner: (Belgium) Michael Vanthourenhout
  - Men's Junior winner: (Denmark) Simon Andreassen

== Mountain bike racing ==
=== UCI Mountain Bike World Cup ===
- April 11 – August 23: 2015 UCI Mountain Bike World Cup
  - April 11 & 12: World Cup #1 (downhill only) in (France) Lourdes
    - Men's Downhill winner: (United States) Aaron Gwin
    - Women's Downhill winner: (France) Emmeline Ragot
    - Men's Junior Downhill winner: (Australia) Andrew Crimmins
  - May 23 & 24: World Cup #2 (Olympic XC only) in (Czech Republic) Nové Město na Moravě
    - Men's Cross Country winner: (Czech Republic) Jaroslav Kulhavý
    - Women's Cross Country winner: (Switzerland) Jolanda Neff
    - Men's Under 23 Cross Country winner: (Switzerland) Lars Forster
    - Women's Under 23 Cross Country winner: (Sweden) Jenny Rissveds
  - May 30 & 31: World Cup #3 (Olympic XC only) in (Germany) Albstadt
    - Men's Cross Country winner: (France) Julien Absalon
    - Women's Cross Country winner: (Switzerland) Jolanda Neff
    - Men's Under 23 Cross Country winner: (Spain) Pablo Rodríguez Guede
    - Women's Under 23 Cross Country winner: (Sweden) Jenny Rissveds
  - June 6 & 7: World Cup #4 (downhill only) in (United Kingdom) Fort William, Scotland
    - Men's Downhill winner: (South Africa) Greg Minnaar
    - Women's Downhill winner: (United Kingdom) Rachel Atherton
    - Men's Junior Downhill winner: (Belgium) Martin Maes
  - June 13 & 14: World Cup #5 (downhill only) in (Austria) Leogang
    - Men's Downhill winner: (United States) Aaron Gwin
    - Women's Downhill winner: (United Kingdom) Rachel Atherton
    - Men's Junior Downhill winner: (Australia) Andrew Crimmins
  - July 4 & 5: World Cup #6 in (Switzerland) Lenzerheide
    - Men's Downhill winner: (South Africa) Greg Minnaar
    - Women's Downhill winner: (United Kingdom) Rachel Atherton
    - Men's Junior Downhill winner: (United Kingdom) Laurie Greenland
    - Men's Cross Country winner: (Czech Republic) Jaroslav Kulhavý
    - Women's Cross Country winner: (Norway) Gunn-Rita Dahle Flesjå
    - Men's U23 Cross Country winner: (Switzerland) Lars Forster
  - August 1 & 2: World Cup #7 in (Canada) Mont-Sainte-Anne
    - Men's Downhill winner: (United Kingdom) Josh Bryceland
    - Women's Downhill winner: (United Kingdom) Rachel Atherton
    - Men's Junior Downhill winner: (United Kingdom) Laurie Greenland
    - Men's Cross Country winner: (Switzerland) Nino Schurter
    - Women's Cross Country winner: (Switzerland) Jolanda Neff
    - Men's U23 Cross Country winner: (France) Titouan Carod
    - Women's U23 Cross Country winner: (Sweden) Jenny Rissveds
  - August 8 & 9: World Cup #8 in (United States) Windham, New York
    - Men's Downhill winner: (United States) Aaron Gwin
    - Women's Downhill winner: (United Kingdom) Rachel Atherton
    - Men's Junior Downhill winner: (United Kingdom) Laurie Greenland
    - Men's Cross Country winner: (Switzerland) Nino Schurter
    - Women's Cross Country winner: (France) Pauline Ferrand-Prévot
    - Men's U23 Cross Country winner: (France) Victor Koretzky
    - Women's U23 Cross Country winner: (Sweden) Jenny Rissveds
  - August 22 & 23: World Cup #9 (final) in (Italy) Val di Sole
    - Men's Downhill winner: (United States) Aaron Gwin
    - Women's Downhill winner: (United Kingdom) Rachel Atherton
    - Men's Junior Downhill winner: (Italy) Loris Revelli
    - Men's Cross Country winner: (Switzerland) Nino Schurter
    - Women's Cross Country winner: (Denmark) Annika Langvad
    - Men's U23 Cross Country winner: (United Kingdom) Grant Ferguson
    - Women's U23 Cross Country winner: (Sweden) Jenny Rissveds

=== World mountain bike championships ===
- June 27: 2015 UCI Mountain Bike Marathon World Championships in (Italy) Sëlva
  - Men's Elite Cross Country Marathon winner: (Austria) Alban Lakata
  - Women's Elite Cross Country Marathon winner: (Norway) Gunn-Rita Dahle Flesjå
- August 31 – September 6: 2015 UCI Mountain Bike & Trials World Championships in (Andorra) Vallnord
- Men
  - Men's Cross Country winner: (Switzerland) Nino Schurter
  - Men's Under 23 Cross Country winner: (New Zealand) Anton Cooper
  - Men's Junior Cross Country winner: (Denmark) Simon Andreassen
  - Men's Cross Country Eliminator winner: (Austria) Daniel Federspiel
  - Men's Downhill winner: (France) Loïc Bruni
  - Men's Junior Downhill winner: (United Kingdom) Laurie Greenland
  - Men's Trials 20" winner: (Spain) Abel Mustieles
  - Men's Junior Trials 20" winner: (Germany) Dominik Oswald
  - Men's Trials 26" winner: (France) Vincent Hermance
  - Men's Junior Trials 26" winner: (France) Nicolas Vallée
- Women
  - Women's Cross Country winner: (France) Pauline Ferrand-Prévot
  - Women's Under 23 Cross Country winner: (Switzerland) Ramona Forchini
  - Women's Junior Cross Country winner: (Italy) Martina Berta
  - Women's Cross Country Eliminator winner: (Switzerland) Linda Indergand
  - Women's Downhill winner: (United Kingdom) Rachel Atherton
  - Women's Junior Downhill winner: (France) Marine Cabirou
  - Women's Trials winner: (Australia) Janine Jungfels
- Team
  - Mixed Cross Country Team Relay winners: France (Victor Koretzky, Jordan Sarrou, Pauline Ferrand-Prévot, Antoine Philipp)
  - Open Team Trials winners: France (Vincent Hermance, Nicolas Fleury, Benjamin Durville, Manon Basseville, Nicolas Vallee)

=== Other mountain biking events ===
- February 24 – 27: 2015 Oceania Mountain Bike Championships in (Australia) Toowoomba
  - Men's Cross Country Eliminator winner: (New Zealand) Anton Cooper
  - Men's Cross Country (XCO) winner: (Australia) Daniel McConnell
  - Women's Cross Country (XCO) winner: (Australia) Rebecca Henderson
  - Men's Downhill winner: (Australia) Connor Fearon
  - Women's Downhill winner: (Australia) Tegan Molloy
  - Men's Junior Cross Country winner: (Australia) Liam Jeffries
  - Women's Junior Cross Country winner: (New Zealand) Jemma Manchester
  - Men's Under 23 Cross Country (XCO) winner: (Australia) Scott Bowden
  - Women's Under 23 Cross Country (XCO) winner: (New Zealand) Amber Johnston
- March 25–29: 2015 American Mountain Bike Continental Championships in Cota
  - Men's Cross Country winner: (Brazil) Henrique Avancini
  - Men's Under 23 Cross Country winner: (United States) Howard Grotts
  - Women's Cross Country winner: (Mexico) Daniela Campuzano
  - Women's Under 23 Cross Country winner: (United States) Kate Courtney
  - Women's Downhill winner (El Salvador) Mariana Salazar Palomo
  - Men's Junior Downhill winner: (Colombia) Diego Hincapie
  - Men's Downhill winner: (United States) Neco Mulally
  - Men's Cross Country Eliminator winner: (Brazil) Luiz Henrique Cocuzzi
  - Women's Cross Country Eliminator winner: (Colombia) Xiomara Guerrero
  - Mixed Cross Country Team Relay winners: Colombia (Jhon Freddy Garzon, Brandon Rivera, Laura Abril, Fabio Hernando Castaneda Monsalve)
- May 5 – 10: 2015 African MTB Continental Championships in (Rwanda) Ruhengeri
  - Men's Junior Cross Country winner: (Namibia) Tristan de Lange
  - Women's Junior Cross Country winner: (Zimbabwe) Skye Davidson
  - Men's Cross Country winner: (South Africa) James Reid
  - Women's Cross Country winner: (South Africa) Bianca Haw
- May 10: 2015 European MTB Continental Championships in (Germany) Singen
  - Men's Cross-Country Marathon winner: (Czech Republic) Jaroslav Kulhavý
  - Women's Cross-Country Marathon winner: (Germany) Sabine Spitz
- June 20–21: 2015 UEC MTB Enduro European Championships in (Austria) Kirchberg in Tirol/Brixental
  - Men Elite: (France) Jérôme Clémentz
  - Men Juniors (Austria) Daniel Schemmel
  - Men Masters 30+ (Switzerland) René Wildhaber
  - Men Masters 40+ (Switzerland) Remo Heutschi
  - Men Masters 50+ (Germany) Carsten Geck
  - Women Masters (Germany) Antje Kramer
  - Women Elite (Netherlands) Anneke Beerten
- July 20–26: 2015 European MTB Continental Championships in (Italy) Chies d'Alpago
  - Men's Cross Country winner: (France) Julien Absalon
  - Women's Cross Country winner: (Switzerland) Jolanda Neff
  - Men's Under 23 Cross Country winner: (Spain) Pablo Rodriguez Guede
  - Women's Cross Country Eliminator winner: (Switzerland) Kathrin Stirnemann
  - Men's Trials 20" winner: (Spain) Benito Ros Charral
  - Men's Trials 26" winner: (United Kingdom) Jack Carthy
  - Men's Cross Country Eliminator winner: (Netherlands) Jeroen Van Eck
  - Women's Under 23 Cross Country winner: (France) Perrine Clauzel
  - Men's Junior Trials 20" winner: (Germany) Dominik Oswald
  - Men's Junior Cross Country winner: (Denmark) Simon Andreassen
  - Women's Junior Cross Country winner: (Switzerland) Sina Frei
  - Men's Junior Trials 26" winner: (France) Nicolas Vallée
  - Women's Trials winner: (Slovakia) Tatiana Janickova
  - Mixed Cross Country Team Relay winners: Germany (Maximilian Brandl, Ben Zwiehoff, Helen Grobert, Manuel Fumic)
- August 12–16: 2015 Asian Mountain Bike Continental Championships in Malaysia
  - Men's Cross Country winner: (Japan) Kohei Yamamoto
  - Women's Cross Country winner: (China) Ren Chengyuan
  - Women's Junior Cross Country winner: (Thailand) Warinothorn Phetpraphan
  - Men's Junior Cross Country winner: (Japan) Ryo Takeuchi
  - Men's Downhill winner: (Chinese Taipei) Sheng-Shan Chiang
  - Women's Downhill winner: (Thailand) Vipavee Deekaballes
  - Mixed Cross Country Team Relay winners: Thailand (Patompob Phonarjthan, Peerapol Chawchiangkwang, Supaksorn Nuntana, Warinothorn Phetpraphan)
- October 11: Aquece Rio International Mountain Bike Challenge 2015 in Brazil (Olympic Test Event)
  - Men's winner: (Switzerland) Nino Schurter
  - Women's winner: (Italy) Eva Lechner

== Road cycling ==
- January 17 – October 4: 2015 UCI World Tour
  - Overall winner: (Spain) Alejandro Valverde ( (Spain) Movistar Team)
- March 14 – August 29: 2015 UCI Women's Road World Cup
  - Overall winner: (United Kingdom) Lizzie Armitstead ( (Netherlands) Boels–Dolmans Cycling Team)

=== Grand Tour ===
- May 9–31: 2015 Giro d'Italia
  - Winner: (Spain) Alberto Contador (second Giro d'Italia win; seventh overall Grand Tour win)
- July 4–26: 2015 Tour de France
  - Winner: (United Kingdom) Chris Froome (second Tour de France and overall Grand Tour wins)
- August 22 – September 13: 2015 Vuelta a España
  - Winner: (Italy) Fabio Aru (first Vuelta a España and overall Grand Tour win)

=== One-Day Races ===
- March 22: 2015 Milan–San Remo in Italy
  - Winner: (Germany) John Degenkolb ( (Germany) Team Giant-Alpecin)
- March 27: 2015 E3 Harelbeke in Belgium
  - Winner: (Wales) Geraint Thomas ( (United Kingdom) Team Sky)
- March 29: 2015 Gent–Wevelgem (Gent – Wevelgem in Flanders Fields) in Belgium
  - Winner: (Italy) Luca Paolini ( (Russia) Team Katusha)
- April 5: 2015 Tour of Flanders in Belgium for Men and Women
  - Men's winner: (Norway) Alexander Kristoff ( (Russia) Team Katusha)
  - Women's winner: (Italy) Elisa Longo Borghini ( (United Kingdom) Wiggle–Honda)
- April 12: 2015 Paris–Roubaix in France
  - Winner: (Germany) John Degenkolb ( (Germany) Team Giant-Alpecin)
- April 19: 2015 Amstel Gold Race in the Netherlands
  - Winner: (Poland) Michał Kwiatkowski ( (Belgium) Etixx–Quick-Step)
- April 22: 2015 La Flèche Wallonne in Belgium for Men and Women
  - Men's winner: (Spain) Alejandro Valverde ( (Spain) Movistar Team)
  - Women's winner: (Netherlands) Anna van der Breggen ( (Netherlands) Rabo–Liv Women Cycling Team)
- April 26: 2015 Liège–Bastogne–Liège in Belgium
  - Winner: (Spain) Alejandro Valverde ( (Spain) Movistar Team)
- August 1: 2015 Clásica de San Sebastián in Spain
  - Winner: (United Kingdom) Adam Yates ( (Australia) Orica–GreenEDGE)
- August 23: 2015 Vattenfall Cyclassics in (Germany) Hamburg
  - Winner: (Germany) André Greipel ( (Belgium) Lotto–Soudal)
- August 30: 2015 GP Ouest-France in Plouay
  - Winner: (Norway) Alexander Kristoff ( (Russia) Team Katusha)
- September 11: 2015 Grand Prix Cycliste de Québec in (Canada) Quebec City
  - Winner: (Colombia) Rigoberto Urán ( (Belgium) Etixx–Quick-Step)
- September 13: 2015 Grand Prix Cycliste de Montréal in Canada
  - Winner: (Belgium) Tim Wellens ( (Belgium) Lotto–Soudal)
- October 5: 2015 Il Lombardia in Italy
  - Winner: (Italy) Vincenzo Nibali ( (Kazakhstan) Astana Pro Team)

=== UCI Para-cycling Road World Cup ===
- June 5 – September 13: 2015 UCI Para-cycling Road World Cup
  - June 5–7: World Cup #1 in (Italy) Maniago
    - For results, click here.
  - June 13–16: World Cup #2 in (Switzerland) Yverdon-les-Bains
    - Click at the "here" word above for results.
  - July 24–26: World Cup #3 in (Germany) Elzach
    - Click at the "here" word above for results.
  - September 11–13: World Cup #4 (final) in (South Africa) Pietermaritzburg
    - Click at the "here" word above for results.

=== Other road cycling championships and events ===
- May 7 – 9: 2015 Pan American Road Cycling Championships for Women in (Mexico) León, Guanajuato
  - Individual Road Race winner: (Cuba) Marlies Mejías
  - Individual Time Trial winner: (United States) Carmen Small
- July 28 – August 2: 2015 UCI Para-cycling Road World Championships in (Switzerland) Nottwil
  - For results, click here.
- August 6–9: 2015 European Road Championships (under 23 and juniors only) in (Estonia) Tartu
  - Poland won the gold medal tally. The Netherlands, Germany, Russia, and Italy won 4 overall medals each.
- August 16: Aquece Rio International Road Cycling Challenge in Brazil (Olympic Test Event)
  - Winner: (France) Alexis Vuillermoz
- September 19–27: 2015 UCI Road World Championships in (United States) Richmond, Virginia
  - Men's Road Race winner: (Slovakia) Peter Sagan
  - Men's Individual Time Trial winner: (Belarus) Vasil Kiryienka
  - Women's Road Race winner: (United Kingdom) Lizzie Armitstead
  - Women's Time Trial winner: (New Zealand) Linda Villumsen
  - Men's Under 23 Road Race winner: (France) Kévin Ledanois
  - Men's Under 23 Individual Time Trial winner: (Denmark) Mads Würtz Schmidt
  - Men's Junior Road Race winner: (Austria) Felix Gall
  - Men's Junior Individual Time Trial winner: (Germany) Leo Appelt
  - Women's Junior Road Race winner: (United States) Chloé Dygert
  - Women's Junior Individual Time Trial winner: (United States) Chloé Dygert
  - Women's Team Time Trial (Germany) Velocio–SRAM Pro Cycling (Alena Amialiusik, Lisa Brennauer, Karol-Ann Canuel, Barbara Guarischi, Mieke Kröger, Trixi Worrack)
  - Men's Team Time Trial (United States) BMC Racing Team (Rohan Dennis, Silvan Dillier, Stefan Küng, Daniel Oss, Taylor Phinney, Manuel Quinziato)

== Track cycling ==
=== TC World Cup ===
- November 8, 2014 – January 18, 2015: 2014–15 UCI Track Cycling World Cup
  - November 8 & 9, 2014: World Cup #1 in (Mexico) Guadalajara
    - Australia won both the gold and overall medal tallies.
  - December 5–7, 2014: World Cup #2 in (United Kingdom) London
    - Germany and Great Britain won 3 gold medals each. Germany won the overall medal tally.
  - January 17 & 18, 2015: World Cup #3 (final) in (Colombia) Cali
    - The Netherlands and Australia won 2 gold medals each. The Netherlands won the overall medal tally.

=== Other track cycling championships ===
- August 8–12, 2014: 2014 UCI Juniors Track World Championships in (South Korea) Seoul
  - Australia won both the gold and overall medal tallies.
- October 4–11, 2014: UCI Track Cycling Masters World Championships in (United Kingdom) Manchester
  - Host nation, Great Britain, won both the gold and overall medal tallies.
- January 21–25: Track Cycling CAC African Championships 2015 in Pietermaritzburg
  - South Africa won both the gold and overall medal tallies.
- January 21–25: 2015 UCI African Continental Championships (Track Para-cycling) in (South Africa) Pietermaritzburg
  - Men's C3 – 1000m Time Trial winner: (South Africa) Juan Odendaal
  - Men's C5 – 1000m Time Trial winner: (South Africa) Dane Wilson (default)
  - Men's C3 – 3 km Pursuit winner: (South Africa) Craig Ridgard
  - Men's C5 – 4 km Pursuit winner: (South Africa) Dane Wilson (default)
  - Women's C4 – 500m Time Trial winner: (South Africa) Roxanne Burns (default)
  - Women's C4 – 3 km Pursuit winner: (South Africa) Roxanne Burns (default)
- February 18 – 22: 2015 UCI Track Cycling World Championships in Saint-Quentin-en-Yvelines
  - Host nation, France, won the gold medal tally. Australia won the overall medal tally.
- March 26–29: 2015 UCI Para-cycling Track World Championships in (Netherlands) Apeldoorn
  - Men: China won both the gold and overall medal tallies.
  - Women: China and Great Britain won 3 gold medals each. The United States won the overall medal tally.
- April 13–17: Track Cycling COPACI Junior American Championships 2015 in Aguascalientes
  - Mexico won both the gold and overall medal tallies.
- July 14–19: 2015 European Track Championships (under-23 & junior) in (Greece) Athens
  - Russia won both the gold and overall medal tallies.
- August 21 & 22: 2015 UEC Derny Track Cycling European Championships in (Germany) Hanover
  - Winner: (Belgium) Kenny De Ketele
- October 8–11: Track Cycling OCC Oceanian Championships 2015 in Invercargill
  - New Zealand won both the gold and overall medal tallies.
- October 14–18: 2015 UEC European Track Championships in (Switzerland) Grenchen
  - Great Britain won the gold medal tally. Great Britain and the Netherlands won 9 overall medals each.

== Trial cycling ==
- May 30 – September 27: 2015 UCI Trials World Cup
  - May 30 & 31: World Cup #1 in (Poland) Kraków
  - Note: The Men's Elite 20" and the Women's Elite events were cancelled here.
    - Men's Elite 26" winner: (United Kingdom) Jack Carthy
  - August 8 & 9: World Cup #2 in (Austria) Vöcklabruck
    - Men's Elite 20" winner: (Spain) Benito Ros
    - Men's Elite 26" winner: (United Kingdom) Jack Carthy
    - Women's Elite winner: (Slovakia) Tatiana Janickova
  - August 22 & 23: World Cup #3 in (France) Albertville
    - Men's Elite 20" winner: (Spain) Abel Mustieles
    - Men's Elite 26" winner: (France) Gilles Coustellier
    - Women's Elite winner: (Slovakia) Tatiana Janickova
  - September 26 & 27: World Cup #4 (final) in (Belgium) Antwerp
    - Men's Elite 20" winner: (Spain) Benito Ros
    - Men's Elite 26" winner: (United Kingdom) Jack Carthy
    - Women's Elite winner: (Australia) Janine Jungfels
- August 31 – September 6: 2015 UCI Trials World Championships in (Andorra) Vallnord
  - Click here for results.
