= Cycling at the 2016 Summer Olympics – Women's BMX =

Women's BMX at the Games of the XXXI Olympiad
- Venue: Olympic BMX Centre
- Date: 17–19 August 2016
- Competitors: 16 from 13 nations
- Winning time: 34.093 s

Medalists
1st place, gold medalist(s)		Mariana Pajón	Colombia
2nd place, silver medalist(s)		Alise Post	United States
3rd place, bronze medalist(s)		Stefany Hernández	Venezuela

The women's BMX racing competition at the 2016 Olympic Games in Rio de Janeiro took place on 17 and 19 August 2016 at the Olympic BMX Centre.

The medals were presented by Camiel Eurlings, IOC member, Netherlands and Brian Cookson, President of the UCI.

== Schedule ==
All times are Brasília Time (UTC−03:00)

Date	Time	Round
Wednesday, 17 August 2016	13:30	Seeding run
Friday, 19 August 2016	13:30	Semi-finals and final

== Results ==
=== Seeding run ===
Rank	Name	Time	Notes
1	Mariana Pajón (COL)	34.508	
2	Caroline Buchanan (AUS)	34.752	
3	Laura Smulders (NED)	35.114	
4	Stefany Hernández (VEN)	35.202	
5	Simone Christensen (DEN)	35.251	
6	Elke Vanhoof (BEL)	35.325	
7	Brooke Crain (USA)	35.345	
8	Alise Post (USA)	35.509	
9	Merle van Benthem (NED)	35.644	
10	Lauren Reynolds (AUS)	35.666	
11	Yaroslava Bondarenko (RUS)	35.682	
12	Manon Valentino (FRA)	36.377	
13	Amanda Carr (THA)	36.464	
14	Nadja Pries (GER)	37.152	
15	Priscilla Carnaval (BRA)	37.534	
16	Gabriela Díaz (ARG)	40.073	

=== Semi-finals ===
Standings after run 2:

==== Semi-final 1 ====
Rank	Name	1st run	2nd run	3rd run	Total	Notes
1	Mariana Pajón (COL)	34.642 (1)	35.098 (1)	34.479 (1)	3	Q
2	Alise Post (USA)	35.480 (3)	35.117 (2)	35.417 (3)	8	Q
3	Stefany Hernández (VEN)	35.282 (2)	52.695 (7)	34.912 (2)	11	Q
4	Manon Valentino (FRA)	36.226 (5)	35.448 (3)	35.744 (4)	12	Q
5	Gabriela Díaz (ARG)	39.669 (8)	38.965 (4)	38.625 (5)	17	
6	Amanda Carr (THA)	36.869 (6)	39.782 (5)	43.217 (7)	18	
7	Simone Christensen (DEN)	35.631 (4)	48.134 (6)	1:21.312 (8)	18	
8	Merle van Benthem (NED)	37.378 (7)	1:47.817 (8)	39.990 (6)	21	

==== Semi-final 2 ====
Rank	Name	1st run	2nd run	3rd run	Total	Notes
1	Laura Smulders (NED)	34.938 (2)	34.670 (1)	34.670 (1)	4	Q
2	Brooke Crain (USA)	35.095 (3)	35.405 (2)	34.891 (2)	7	Q
3	Elke Vanhoof (BEL)	35.350 (4)	36.834 (6)	35.570 (3)	13	Q
4	Yaroslava Bondarenko (RUS)	35.800 (5)	35.310 (3)	36.126 (5)	13	Q
5	Caroline Buchanan (AUS)	34.523 (1)	35.405 (4)	1:21.586 (8)	13	
6	Lauren Reynolds (AUS)	35.800 (6)	53.373 (7)	36.017 (4)	17	
7	Nadja Pries (GER)	36.864 (7)	36.683 (5)	38.540 (7)	19	
8	Priscilla Carnaval (BRA)	36.949 (8)	54.183 (8)	38.210 (6)	22	

=== Final ===
Rank	Name	Time
1st place, gold medalist(s)	Mariana Pajón (COL)	34.093
2nd place, silver medalist(s)	Alise Post (USA)	34.435
3rd place, bronze medalist(s)	Stefany Hernández (VEN)	34.755
4	Brooke Crain (USA)	35.520
5	Yaroslava Bondarenko (RUS)	36.017
6	Elke Vanhoof (BEL)	39.538
7	Laura Smulders (NED)	1:52.235
8	Manon Valentino (FRA)	2:41.109
