= Cycling at the 2023 Pan American Games – Women's BMX racing =

Women's BMX racing at the 2023 Pan American Games
- Venue: San Cristóbal Metropolitan Park
- Dates: October 21 - October 22
- Competitors: 17 from 10 nations
- Winning time: 34.400

Medalists
Gold medal	Mariana Pajón	Colombia
Silver medal	Molly Simpson	Canada
Bronze medal	Gabriela Bolle	Colombia

The women's BMX racing competition of the cycling events at the 2023 Pan American Games was held from October 21 to 22 at the San Cristóbal Metropolitan Park in Santiago, Chile.

== Schedule ==
Date	Time	Round
October 21, 2023	11:30	Seeding Run
October 22, 2023	11:00	Quarterfinals – Run 1
October 22, 2023	11:30	Quarterfinals – Run 2
October 22, 2023	12:00	Quarterfinals – Run 3
October 22, 2023	12:48	Semifinals – Run 1
October 22, 2023	13:20	Semifinals – Run 2
October 22, 2023	13:46	Semifinals – Run 3
October 22, 2023	14:30	Final

== Results ==
=== Seeding run ===
20 riders from 10 countries was started:

Rank	Name	Nation	Time
1	Mariana Pajón	Colombia	35.150
2	Payton Ridenour	United States	35.730
3	Molly Simpson	Canada	35.880
4	Gabriela Bolle	Colombia	35.980
5	Daleny Vaughn	United States	36.180
6	Paola Reis	Brazil	36.600
7	Doménica Azuero	Ecuador	37.150
8	Teigen Pascual	Canada	37.180
9	Doménica Mora	Ecuador	37.480
10	Priscilla Carnaval	Brazil	37.810
11	Shanayah Howell	Aruba	37.900
12	Rosario Aguilera	Chile	38.590
13	Rocío Pizarro	Chile	40.620
14	Andrea González	Independent Athletes Team	41.310
15	María Peinado	Bolivia	42.310
16	María Enriquez	Bolivia	43.870
17	Andrea Romero	Paraguay	53.230

=== Quarterfinals ===
First 4 riders in each quarterfinal qualify to semifinal.

==== Quarterfinal 1 ====
Rank	Name	Nation	Race 1	Race 2	Race 3	Total	Notes
1	Mariana Pajón	Colombia	35.300 (1)	35.500 (1)	36.100 (1)	3	Q
2	Paola Reis	Brazil	35.700 (2)	36.700 (2)	36.200 (2)	6	Q
3	Doménica Azuero	Ecuador	36.900 (3)	38.300 (3)	38.900 (3)	9	Q
4	Rosario Aguilera	Chile	38.500 (4)	39.400 (4)	39.300 (4)	12	Q
5	Rocío Pizarro	Chile	40.700 (5)	40.300 (5)	40.100 (5)	15	

==== Quarterfinal 2 ====
Rank	Name	Nation	Race 1	Race 2	Race 3	Total	Notes
1	Payton Ridenour	United States	36.300 (2)	35.200 (1)	35.500 (1)	4	Q
2	Daleny Vaughn	United States	36.000 (1)	36.100 (2)	36.000 (2)	5	Q
3	Teigen Pascual	Canada	36.400 (3)	38.300 (4)	36.750 (3)	10	Q
4	Shanayah Howell	Aruba	37.000 (4)	36.800 (3)	36.800 (4)	11	Q
5	Andrea González	Independent Athletes Team	40.500 (5)	40.400 (5)	40.500 (5)	15	
6	Andrea Romero	Paraguay	54.500 (6)	54.400 (6)	53.300 (6)	18	

==== Quarterfinal 3 ====
Rank	Name	Nation	Race 1	Race 2	Race 3	Total	Notes
1	Gabriela Bolle	Colombia	34.500 (1)	35.300 (1)	36.100 (2)	4	Q
2	Molly Simpson	Canada	35.300 (2)	35.600 (2)	35.400 (1)	5	Q
3	Doménica Mora	Ecuador	36.200 (3)	36.700 (3)	38.800 (3)	9	Q
4	Priscilla Carnaval	Brazil	37.400 (4)	37.400 (4)	40.200 (4)	12	Q
5	María Peinado	Bolivia	37.900 (5)	41.100 (5)	41.500 (5)	15	
6	María Enriquez	Bolivia	39.000 (6)	42.000 (6)	41.700 (6)	18	

=== Semifinals ===
First 4 riders in each semifinal qualify to final.

==== Semifinal 1 ====
Rank	Name	Nation	Race 1	Race 2	Race 3	Total	Notes
1	Mariana Pajón	Colombia	35.200 (1)	35.700 (1)	35.820 (1)	3	Q
2	Daleny Vaughn	United States	35.900 (3)	35.900 (2)	36.200 (3)	8	Q
3	Molly Simpson	Canada	35.400 (2)	37.300 (5)	35.850 (2)	9	Q
4	Doménica Azuero	Ecuador	36.600 (5)	36.800 (4)	36.500 (4)	13	Q
5	Shanayah Howell	Aruba	36.500 (4)	37.500 (6)	37.300 (5)	15	
5	Doménica Mora	Ecuador	36.900 (6)	36.200 (3)	37.500 (6)	15	

==== Semifinal 2 ====
Rank	Name	Nation	Race 1	Race 2	Race 3	Total	Notes
1	Payton Ridenour	United States	35.100 (1)	35.100 (1)	35.400 (2)	4	Q
2	Gabriela Bolle	Colombia	37.000 (4)	35.750 (2)	35.100 (1)	7	Q
3	Paola Reis	Brazil	35.900 (2)	35.790 (3)	36.300 (3)	8	Q
4	Priscilla Carnaval	Brazil	36.600 (3)	36.200 (4)	36.680 (5)	12	Q
5	Teigen Pascual	Canada	38.400 (5)	37.000 (5)	36.600 (4)	14	
6	Rosario Aguilera	Chile	39.400 (6)	38.800 (6)	38.100 (6)	18	

=== Final ===
Rank	Name	Nation	Time	Notes
1st place, gold medalist(s)	Mariana Pajón	Colombia	34.400	
2nd place, silver medalist(s)	Molly Simpson	Canada	36.000	
3rd place, bronze medalist(s)	Gabriela Bolle	Colombia	36.500	
4	Priscilla Carnaval	Brazil	38.700	
5	Payton Ridenour	United States	39.800	
6	Doménica Azuero	Ecuador	41.300	
7	Daleny Vaughn	United States	41.800	
8	Paola Reis	Brazil	53.300	
