= Cycling at the 2010 South American Games – Women's BMX 20 inches wheel =

The Women's BMX 20" wheel event at the 2010 South American Games was held on March 18. The qualifications started at 9:15 and the Final at 10:50.

== Medalists ==
Gold	Silver	Bronze
Mariana Pajón; Colombia	Gabriela Díaz; Argentina	Andrea Zuluaga; Colombia

== Results ==
=== Qualification ===
==== Heat 1 ====
Rank	Rider	Run 1	Run 2	Run 3	Total
1	Mariana Pajón (COL)	53.787 (1)	51.251 (1)	51.275 (1)	3 Q
2	Stefany Hernández (VEN)	1:14.869 (4)	52.986 (2)	52.802 (2)	8 Q
3	Belen Alcaide (CHI)	55.739 (2)	55.427 (4)	54.566 (3)	9 Q
4	Luisa Fernanda Correa (COL)	58.426 (3)	55.109 (3)	55.705 (5)	11 Q
5	Squel Stein (BRA)	DNF (5)	58.498 (5)	55.608 (4)	14
6	Naiara Silva (BRA)	DNS (8)	DNS (8)		DSQ

==== Heat 2 ====
Rank	Rider	Run 1	Run 2	Run 3	Total
1	Andrea Zuluaga (COL)	55.503 (1)	57.370 (1)	52.236 (1)	3 Q
2	María Belén Dutto (ARG)	56.883 (2)	1:02.233 (2)	59.833 (3)	7 Q
3	Gabriela Díaz (ARG)	1:04.266 (4)	1:06.040 (3)	52.399 (2)	9 Q
4	Florencia Ayelen Soriano (ARG)	1:02.233 (3)	1:07.290 (4)	1:05.266 (4)	11 Q
	Kimmy Diquez (VEN)	DNS (7)	DNS (7)		DSQ

=== Final ===
Rank	Rider	Run
1st place, gold medalist(s)	Mariana Pajón (COL)	47.709
2nd place, silver medalist(s)	Gabriela Díaz (ARG)	48.490
3rd place, bronze medalist(s)	Andrea Zuluaga (COL)	49.757
4	Stefany Hernández (VEN)	50.964
5	Belen Alcaide (CHI)	54.312
6	Luisa Fernanda Correa (COL)	55.314
7	María Belén Dutto (ARG)	55.457
8	Florencia Ayelen Soriano (ARG)	55.689
