= Cycling at the 2010 South American Games – Women's BMX 24 inches wheel =

The Women's BMX 24" wheel event at the 2010 South American Games was held on March 19. The qualifications started at 9:00 and the Final at 10:30.

== Medalists ==
Gold	Silver	Bronze
Mariana Pajón; Colombia	Stefany Hernández; Venezuela	Andrea Zuluaga; Colombia

== Results ==
=== Qualification ===
==== Heat 1 ====
Rank	Rider	Run 1	Run 2	Run 3	Total
1	Mariana Pajón (COL)	51.414 (1)	55.042 (3)	50.929 (1)	5 Q
2	Stefany Hernández (VEN)	51.648 (2)	51.458 (1)	53.326 (2)	5 Q
3	Squel Stein (BRA)	55.749 (3)	54.952 (2)	56.496 (4)	9 Q
4	Florencia Ayelen Soriano (ARG)	57.552 (5)	55.700 (4)	56.394 (3)	12 Q
5	Belen Nayadet Alcaide (CHI)	56.927 (4)	1:01.323 (5)	58.896 (5)	14
6	Kimmy Diquez (VEN)	DNS (8)	DNS (8)		DSQ

==== Heat 2 ====
Rank	Rider	Run 1	Run 2	Run 3	Total
1	Andrea Zuluaga (COL)	55.122 (1)	1:06.688 (4)	53.746 (1)	6 Q
2	Luisa Fernanda Correa (COL)	55.847 (2)	58.320 (2)	58.607 (2)	6 Q
3	María Belén Dutto (ARG)	56.824 (3)	57.024 (1)	1:03.752 (4)	8 Q
4	Naiara Silva (BRA)	57.281 (4)	1:00.099 (3)	1:01.292 (3)	10 Q
	Gabriela Díaz (ARG)	1:08.001 (5)	DNF (5)	DNS (7)	17

=== Final ===
Rank	Rider	Run
1st place, gold medalist(s)	Mariana Pajón (COL)	48.013
2nd place, silver medalist(s)	Stefany Hernández (VEN)	50.264
3rd place, bronze medalist(s)	Andrea Zuluaga (COL)	50.969
4	Squel Stein (BRA)	54.922
5	Florencia Ayelen Soriano (ARG)	55.065
6	Naiara Silva (BRA)	55.087
7	María Belén Dutto (ARG)	55.670
8	Luisa Fernanda Correa (COL)	DNF
