= Cycling at the 2011 Pan American Games – Women's BMX =

Cycling – Women's BMX at the 2011 Pan American Games
- Venue: CODE San Nicolás
- Dates: October 21
- Competitors: 10 from 7 nations

Medalists
Gold medal	Mariana Pajón	Colombia
Silver medal	Arielle Martin	United States
Bronze medal	Gabriela Díaz	Argentina

The women's BMX competition of the cycling events at the 2011 Pan American Games was held on October 21 at the CODE San Nicolás in Guadalajara. The defending champion is Maria Gabriela Diaz of Argentina.

== Schedule ==
All times are Central Standard Time (UTC-6).

Date	Time	Round
October 21, 2011	9:15	Qualification Run 1
October 21, 2011	9:35	Qualification Run 2
October 21, 2011	9:55	Qualification Run 3
October 21, 2011	10:45	Final

== Results ==
=== Qualification ===
First 4 riders in each heat qualify to final.

Rank	Heat	Name	Nation	Run 1	Run 2	Run 3	Points	Notes
1	1	Arielle Martin	United States	43.835 (1)	43.339 (1)	41.816 (1)	3	Q
2	1	Andrea Zuluaga	Colombia	45.441 (2)	46.423 (2)	45.969 (2)	6	Q
3	1	Mariana Díaz	Argentina	46.951 (3)	47.009 (3)	48.363 (3)	9	Q
4	1	Naiara Silva	Brazil	54.011 (4)	47.936 (4)	52.219 (4)	12	Q
5	1	Squel Stein	Brazil	DNF (5)	DSQ (7)	DSQ (7)	19	
1	2	Mariana Pajón	Colombia	42.321 (1)	42.909 (1)	43.018 (1)	3	Q
2	2	Gabriela Díaz	Argentina	44.494 (2)	44.336 (2)	45.350 (3)	7	Q
3	2	Amanda Carr	United States	45.290 (3)	44.912 (3)	44.270 (2)	8	Q
4	2	Dominique Daniels	Puerto Rico	46.002 (4)	46.138 (4)	45.532 (4)	12	Q
5	2	Belen Nayadet Tapia	Chile	48.212 (5)	47.486 (5)	47.152 (5)	15	

=== Final ===
Rank	Name	Nation	Time	Notes
1st place, gold medalist(s)	Mariana Pajón	Colombia	40.118	
2nd place, silver medalist(s)	Arielle Martin	United States	42.659	
3rd place, bronze medalist(s)	Gabriela Díaz	Argentina	42.971	
4	Mariana Díaz	Argentina	45.278	
5	Dominique Daniels	Puerto Rico	45.632	
6	Naiara Silva	Brazil	47.944	
7	Andrea Zuluaga	Colombia	49.098	
8	Amanda Carr	United States	2:58.670	
