= Cycling at the 2019 Pan American Games – Women's BMX racing =

Women's BMX racing at the 2019 Pan American Games
- Venue: Circuito BMX
- Dates: August 8–9
- Competitors: 14 from 10 nations
- Winning time: 36.323

Medalists
| Gold medal | Mariana Pajón | Colombia |
| Silver medal | Paola Reis | Brazil |
| Bronze medal | Stefany Hernández | Venezuela |

The men's BMX racing competition of the cycling events at the 2019 Pan American Games was held on August 8 and August 9 at the Circuito BMX.

== Schedule ==
| Date | Time | Round |
|---|---|---|
| August 8, 2019 | 11:30 | Time Trials |
| August 9, 2019 | 12:30 | Semifinals |
| August 9, 2019 | 14:00 | Final |

== Results ==
=== Time Trials ===
14 riders from 10 countries was started

| Rank | Name | Nation | Time |
|---|---|---|---|
| 1 | Mariana Pajón | Colombia | 37.221 |
| 2 | Paola Reis | Brazil | 38.367 |
| 3 | Stefany Hernández | Venezuela | 38.674 |
| 4 | Priscilla Carnaval | Brazil | 38.770 |
| 5 | Drew Mechielsen | Canada | 38.849 |
| 6 | Shanayah Howell | Aruba | 39.233 |
| 7 | Doménica Azuero | Ecuador | 39.453 |
| 8 | Daina Tuchscherer | Canada | 40.136 |
| 9 | Sophia Foresta | United States | 40.266 |
| 10 | Gabriela Bolle | Colombia | 40.390 |
| 11 | Karla Carrera | Ecuador | 42.959 |
| 12 | Rocío Pizarro | Chile | 44.650 |
| 13 | Andrea González | Guatemala | 46.200 |
| 14 | Luciana Yi Lecaros | Peru | 46.572 |

=== Semifinals ===
First 4 riders in each semifinal qualify to final.

==== Semifinal 1 ====
| Rank | Name | Nation | Race 1 | Race 2 | Race 3 | Points | Notes |
|---|---|---|---|---|---|---|---|
| 1 | Mariana Pajón | Colombia | 37.499 (1) | 37.780 (1) | 36.843 (1) | 3 | Q |
| 2 | Priscilla Carnaval | Brazil | 37.684 (2) | 37.915 (2) | 37.454 (2) | 6 | Q |
| 3 | Daina Tuchscherer | Canada | 39.225 (4) | 39.222 (3) | 38.692 (3) | 10 | Q |
| 4 | Drew Mechielsen | Canada | 38.134 (3) | 1:47.314 (7) | 38.832 (4) | 14 | Q |
| 5 | Sophia Foresta | United States | 40.018 (5) | 39.533 (4) | 39.587 (5) | 14 | |
| 6 | Rocío Pizarro | Chile | 44.421 (6) | 44.915 (5) | 45.171 (6) | 17 | |
| 7 | Andrea González | Guatemala | 45.952 (7) | 46.548 (6) | 47.341 (7) | 20 | |

==== Semifinal 2 ====
| Rank | Name | Nation | Race 1 | Race 2 | Race 3 | Points | Notes |
|---|---|---|---|---|---|---|---|
| 1 | Paola Reis | Brazil | 38.628 (3) | 38.086 (1) | 37.467 (1) | 5 | Q |
| 2 | Stefany Hernández | Venezuela | 38.331 (1) | 38.141 (2) | 38.214 (2) | 5 | Q |
| 3 | Shanayah Howell | Aruba | 38.565 (2) | 38.478 (3) | 38.608 (4) | 9 | Q |
| 4 | Gabriela Bolle | Colombia | 39.208 (4) | 38.979 (4) | 38.579 (3) | 11 | Q |
| 5 | Karla Carrera | Ecuador | 42.557 (5) | 42.497 (5) | 42.772 (5) | 15 | |
| 6 | Luciana Yi Lecaros | Peru | 45.465 (6) | 45.541 (6) | 45.334 (6) | 18 | |
| 7 | Doménica Azuero | Ecuador | 1:15.886 (7) | DNS (9) | DNS (9) | 25 | |

=== Final ===
| Rank | Name | Nation | Time | Notes |
|---|---|---|---|---|
| 1st place, gold medalist(s) | Mariana Pajón | Colombia | 36.323 | |
| 2nd place, silver medalist(s) | Paola Reis | Brazil | 37.583 | |
| 3rd place, bronze medalist(s) | Stefany Hernández | Venezuela | 38.106 | |
| 4 | Priscilla Carnaval | Brazil | 38.122 | |
| 5 | Shanayah Howell | Aruba | 38.630 | |
| 6 | Gabriela Bolle | Colombia | 38.877 | |
| 7 | Drew Mechielsen | Canada | 39.054 | |
| 8 | Daina Tuchscherer | Canada | 39.601 | |
