= 2014 UCI BMX World Championships =

- Venue: Rotterdam, Netherlands
- Date: 22–27 July 2014
- Events: 8

The 2014 UCI BMX World Championships were the nineteenth edition of the UCI BMX World Championships and took place in Rotterdam, Netherlands, and crowned world champions in the cycling discipline of BMX racing.

== Medal summary ==
Event	Gold	Silver	Bronze
Men's events
Elite Men	Sam Willoughby; Australia	Tory Nyhaug; Canada	Tre Whyte; Great Britain
Junior Men	Niek Kimmann; Netherlands	Sean Gaian; United States	Romain Racine; France
Elite Men Time Trial	Sam Willoughby; Australia	Corben Sharrah; United States	Joris Daudet; France
Junior Men Time Trial	Niek Kimmann; Netherlands	Collin Hudson; United States	Brandon Te Hiko; Australia
Women's events
Elite Women	Mariana Pajón; Colombia	Alise Post; United States	Laura Smulders; Netherlands
Junior Women	Doménica Azuero; Ecuador	Shealen Reno; United States	Tatiana Kapitanova; Russia
Elite Women Time Trial	Laura Smulders; Netherlands	Caroline Buchanan; Australia	Mariana Pajón; Colombia
Junior Women Time Trial	Sandie Thibaut; France	Doménica Azuero; Ecuador	Shealen Reno; United States

== Medal table ==
* Host nation (Netherlands)

Rank	Nation	Gold	Silver	Bronze	Total
1	Netherlands (NED)*	3	0	1	4
2	Australia (AUS)	2	1	1	4
3	Ecuador (ECU)	1	1	0	2
4	France (FRA)	1	0	2	3
5	Colombia (COL)	1	0	1	2
6	United States (USA)	0	5	1	6
7	Canada (CAN)	0	1	0	1
8	Great Britain (GBR)	0	0	1	1
8	Russia (RUS)	0	0	1	1
Totals (9 entries)		8	8	8	24
