= 2010 UCI BMX World Championships =

- Venue: Pietermaritzburg, South Africa
- Date: 29 July – 1 August 2010
- Events: 8

The 2010 UCI BMX World Championships took place in Pietermaritzburg, South Africa, and crowned world champions in the cycling discipline of BMX racing. For the first time, there were no titles awarded in the Cruiser class

== Medal summary ==
Event	Gold		Silver		Bronze	
Men's events
Elite men	Māris Štrombergs; Latvia	28.648	Sifiso Nhlapo; South Africa	29.544	Joris Daudet; France	29.774
Junior men	Sylvain André; France		Kristers Lejiņš; Latvia		Twan van Gendt; Netherlands	
Elite men cruiser	Renato Rezende; Brazil		Andrés Jiménez; Colombia		Carlos Oquendo; Colombia	
Junior men cruiser	David Oquendo; Colombia		Benjamin Clarke; Australia		Daniel Franks; New Zealand	
Women's events
Elite women	Shanaze Reade; Great Britain	31.879	Sarah Walker; New Zealand	32.991	Alise Post; United States	33.894
Junior women	Merle van Benthem; Netherlands		Brooke Crain; United States		Melinda McLeod; Australia	
Elite women cruiser	Mariana Pajón; Colombia		Romana Labounková; Czech Republic		Vilma Rimšaitė; Lithuania	
Junior women cruiser	Teagan O'Keeffe; South Africa		Enora Le Roux; France		Bianca Quinalha; Brazil	

== Medal table ==
* Host nation (South Africa)

Rank	Nation	Gold	Silver	Bronze	Total
1	Colombia (COL)	2	1	1	4
2	France (FRA)	1	1	1	3
3	Latvia (LAT)	1	1	0	2
3	South Africa (RSA)*	1	1	0	2
5	Brazil (BRA)	1	0	1	2
5	Netherlands (NED)	1	0	1	2
7	Great Britain (GBR)	1	0	0	1
8	Australia (AUS)	0	1	1	2
8	New Zealand (NZL)	0	1	1	2
8	United States (USA)	0	1	1	2
11	Czech Republic (CZE)	0	1	0	1
12	Lithuania (LTU)	0	0	1	1
Totals (12 entries)		8	8	8	24
