= Sharrah =

Sharrah is a surname. Notable people with this surname include:

- Corben Sharrah (born 1992), American BMX rider

== See also ==
- Sharia
