= Daleny Vaughn =

American professional BMX racer

Personal information
- Born: March 27, 2001 (age 25) Tucson, Arizona, U.S.

Cycling career
- Sport: Cycling
- Current team: Odyssey BMX
- Discipline: BMX racing
- Role: Rider
- Rider type: Elite Women
Medal record
Women's BMX racing
Representing United States
Event	1st	2nd	3rd
World Championships	0	0	1
World Cup rounds	0	0	1
Pan American Championships	0	0	1
Total	0	0	3
World Championships
Bronze medal – third place	2024 Rock Hill	BMX racing
Pan American Championships
Bronze medal – third place	2024 Bogotá	BMX racing

Daleny Vaughn (born March 27, 2001) is an American cyclist who competes in BMX racing. She was a bronze medalist at the 2024 World Championships.

== Career ==
From Tucson, Arizona, where her parents ran a race track, she is a member of Odyssey BMX.

She qualified for the final of the 2023 Pan American Games in Santiago, where she placed seventh overall.

She was a bronze medalist at the 2024 UCI BMX World Championships in Rock Hill, South Carolina in June 2024. She was subsequently selected for the 2024 Summer Olympics.
