= Tony Hoffman =

Motivational speaker and a coach

- Born: 8 November 1983 (age 42)
- Education: Clovis High School
- Occupations: Motivational speaker, BMX racing Coach
- Website: tonyhoffmanspeaking.com

Tony Hoffman (born November 8, 1983) is an American motivational speaker and a coach for BMX racing athletes. He was also a former BMX athlete and rider.

== Early life and education ==
Hoffman was born in Clovis and raised in Central California. He graduated from Clovis High School in 2002. While still in school, he became an athlete and engaged in several sports activities for the school.

== Career ==
Hoffman was a BMX rider and an Amateur BMX athlete for several years in the course of his sports career. He battled with mental health and suicidal thoughts but engaging in sports helped him a great deal to recover from the habits. Following his exit from BMX circuit, he fell into drug addiction, drug sales and crime. He later recovered from addiction and crime in 2007 after he was arrested and sentenced to prison for four and half years.

After completing his jail term, Hoffman raced BMX professional at the elite level for several years' He sustained an injury that ended his BMX racing career. He thereafter switched to coaching BMX racing athletes. He coached Brooke Crain to 4th place at Rio Olympics.

In 2012, Hoffman founded The Freewheel Project. In 2022, he co-founded pH Wellness, a drug & alcohol treatment facility. Presently, Hoffman is motivational speaker on mental health, drug misuse and incarceration.
