= Sara Harvey =

Sara Harvey may refer to:

- Sara M. Harvey (born 1976), American costume designer and author
- Sara Harvey (Pretty Little Liars), a character in the TV series Pretty Little Liars

== See also ==
- Sarah Harvey (born 1995), Australian BMX rider
