= Arielle Martin =

American BMX rider

Personal information
- Born: July 30, 1985 (age 40) Cedar Hills, Utah, U.S.
- Height: 5 ft 5 in (1.65 m)
- Weight: 143 lb (65 kg)

Sport
- Country: United States
- Sport: Cycling
- Event: BMX
- Coached by: James Herrera
Medal record
Women's BMX racing
Representing United States
Event	1st	2nd	3rd
World Championships	0	0	1
World Cup	1	1	1
World Cup rounds	1	4	3
Pan American Games	0	1	0
Total	2	6	5
World Championships
Bronze medal – third place	2009 Adelaide	BMX racing
World Cup
Gold medal – first place	2008	BMX racing
Silver medal – second place	2013	BMX racing
Bronze medal – third place	2009	BMX racing
Pan American Games
Silver medal – second place	2011 Gualadajara	BMX racing

Arielle Martin (aka Arielle Verhaaren; born July 30, 1985) is an American BMX cyclist.

She crashed in the quarter-finals at the World Championships held in Taiyuan, China, on June 2, 2008, with the result that Jill Kintner, her friend and roommate at the Olympic Training Center in Chula Vista, California, finished in sixth place, which was enough to guarantee Jill the only automatic women's spot on the US BMX Olympic Team. USA Cycling has a 17-race points series, and Jill had 129 points to Martin's 128. Kintner made up and went beyond a 13-point deficit with her sixth place and Martin's crash, became the one US Women's representative in the BMX racing event, and received a bronze medal, a medal she says was half won by Martin, who, after crashing, returned to the training center to help Kintner train. The two say that living together in the training center just made them able to push each other, as they remained neck and neck until Martin's accident. They had worked so hard together that Kintner characterized her win as bittersweet, at first more bitter than sweet.

Martin finished a degree in exercise science in 2007 at Brigham Young University. She was married in December 2007 to Michael Verhaaren and has taken his name except for when she is involved in bike competitions. They left their Utah home on separate missions, she to train for the 2008 Olympic Games in Beijing, and he to spend a year deployed in Afghanistan with the US Army.

Martin's father was a BMX racer. As a young girl, she watched him, then started riding a BMX bike at the age of two. At 15 she turned pro and in October 2007, became the third woman in the world to do a backflip on a BMX bike. Martin has said that missing the Beijing Olympics made her more determined than ever to remain at the top in BMX and to compete at the 2012 Olympic Games in London. Martin was selected to compete at the London 2012 Olympics but a crash during a training run on July 30 in California, hospitalized her and left her out of the team, being replaced by Brooke Crain.

Martin is a member of the Church of Jesus Christ of Latter-day Saints.
