= 2017 UCI BMX World Championships =

- Venue: Rock Hill, United States
- Date: July 25–29, 2017
- Stadium: Novant Health BMX Supercross Track
- Nations participating: 34
- Cyclists participating: 244
- Events: 4

The 2017 UCI BMX World Championships was the 22nd edition of the UCI BMX World Championships, and took place at the Novant Health BMX Supercross Track in Rock Hill, South Carolina, United States from July 25 to 29, 2017.

In contrast to the 2016 edition, only four medal events were held.

== Medal summary ==
=== Elite events ===
Event	Gold		Silver		Bronze	
Men's race	Corben Sharrah; United States	32.913	Sylvain André; France	32.951	Joris Daudet; France	33.891
Women's race	Alise Willoughby; United States	33.235	Caroline Buchanan; Australia	33.243	Mariana Pajón; Colombia	33.989

=== Junior events ===
Event	Gold		Silver		Bronze	
Men's race	Cédric Butti; Switzerland	35.041	Kevin van de Groenendaal; Netherlands	35.253	Mikus Strazdiņš; Latvia	35.695
Women's race	Beth Shriever; Great Britain	34.478	Saya Sakakibara; Australia	34.595	Vineta Pētersone; Latvia	35.701

== Medal table ==
* Host nation (United States)

Rank	Nation	Gold	Silver	Bronze	Total
1	United States (USA)*	2	0	0	2
2	Great Britain (GBR)	1	0	0	1
2	Switzerland (SUI)	1	0	0	1
4	Australia (AUS)	0	2	0	2
5	France (FRA)	0	1	1	2
6	Netherlands (NED)	0	1	0	1
7	Latvia (LAT)	0	0	2	2
8	Colombia (COL)	0	0	1	1
Totals (8 entries)		4	4	4	12
