= Seko =

Seko may refer to:

- Seko language, a language of Sulawesi, Indonesia
- Seko, Indonesia, a district in South Sulawesi, Indonesia
- Seko Rural LLG in Morobe Province, Papua New Guinea
- seko (folkore), a yōkai subtype of the Japanese kappa
- seko (hunter), in traditional Japanese hunting practice, drivers who beat bushes and make noises to scare game into the open.

== People with the given name ==
- Seko Fofana (born 1995), Ivorian footballer
- Sekō Higa (比嘉 世幸; 1898–1966), Japanese karateka

== People with the surname ==
- Ayumu Seko (瀬古 歩夢; born 2000), Japanese footballer
- Haruka Seko (born 1996), Japanese BMX rider
- Hiroshi Seko (瀬古浩司), Japanese screenwriter
- Hiroshige Sekō (世耕 弘成; born 1962), Japanese politician
- Mobutu Sese Seko (1930 – 1997), dictator of Zaire from 1965 to 1997
- Toshihiko Seko (瀬古 利彦; born 1956), Japanese long-distance runner

== Fiction ==
- Seko, Khumba's father in Khumba

== See also ==
- Swedish Union for Service and Communications Employees, a trade union in Sweden
