= Natalia Suvorova =

Russian BMX cyclist

Personal information
- Born: 22 August 1995 (age 31) Saransk, Russia

Cycling career
- Sport: Cycling
- Discipline: BMX racing
- Role: Rider

Natalia Suvorova (born 22 August 1995) is a Russian BMX rider, representing her nation at international competitions. She competed in the time trial event and race event at the 2015 UCI BMX World Championships.
