= Molly Simpson =

Canadian track cyclist (born 2002)

Personal information
- Born: December 11, 2002 (age 23) Red Deer, Alberta, Canada

Cycling career
- Sport: Cycling
- Discipline: BMX racing
Medal record
Women's BMX racing
Representing Canada
Event	1st	2nd	3rd
World U23 Championships	0	0	1
World Cup	0	0	1
World Cup rounds	1	0	3
World Cup U23 rounds	1	1	1
Pan American Games	0	1	0
Pan American Championships	0	1	0
Total	2	3	6
World Cup
Bronze medal – third place	2025	BMX racing
Pan American Games
Silver medal – second place	2023 Santiago	BMX racing
Pan American Championships
Silver medal – second place	2023 Riobamba	BMX racing
World U23 Championships
Bronze medal – third place	2022 Nantes	BMX racing

Molly Simpson (born December 11, 2002) is a Canadian BMX cyclist.

== Career ==
At the 2023 Pan American Games, Simpson won silver in the women's BMX racing event. In June 2024, Simpson was named to Canada's Olympic team.
