= Elke Vanhoof =

Belgian BMX cyclist

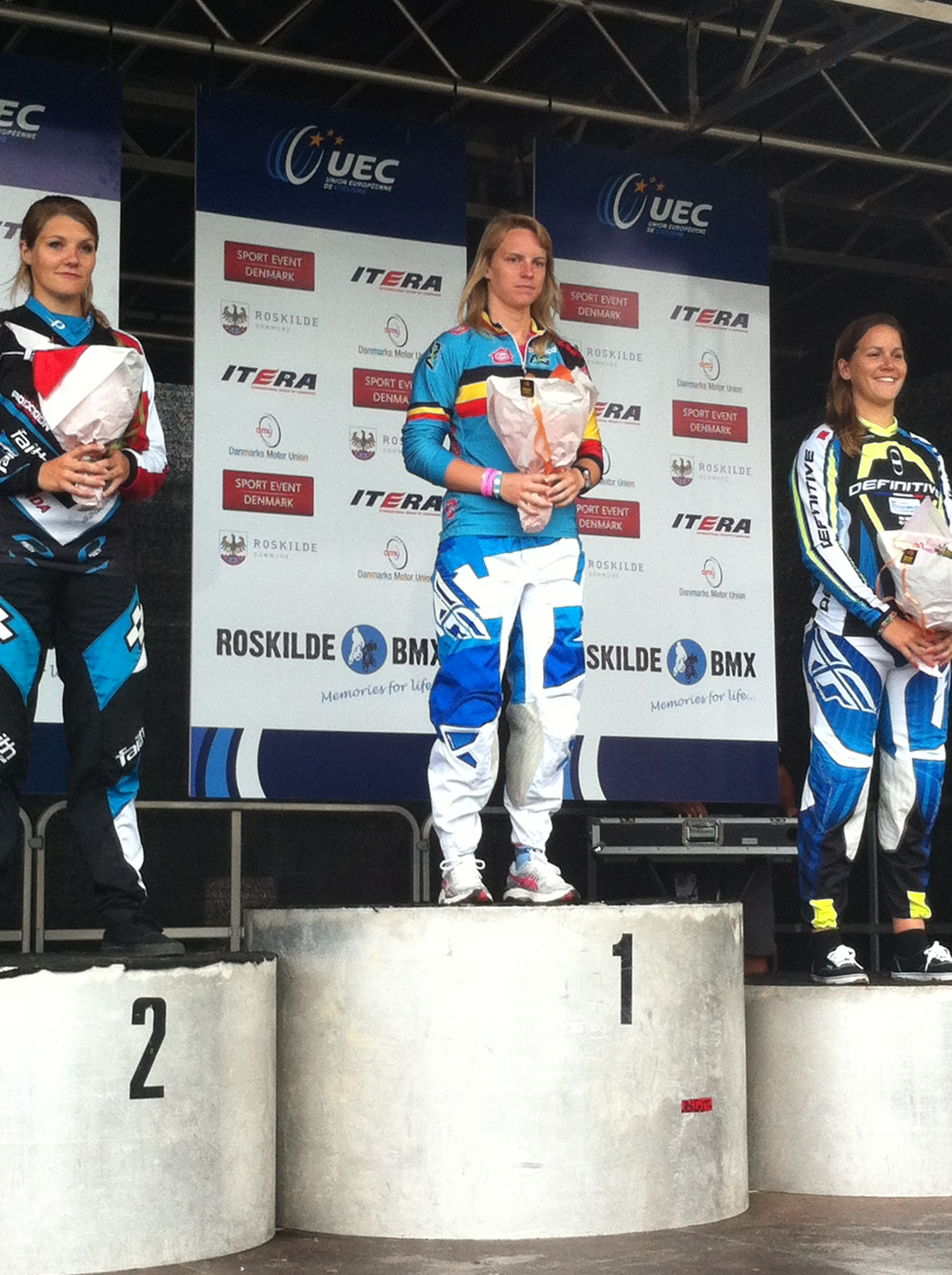
- Vanhoof in 2014

Personal information
- Born: 16 December 1991 (age 34) Mol, Belgium

Cycling career
- Sport: Cycling
- Discipline: BMX racing
- Role: Rider
Medal record
Women's BMX racing
Representing Belgium
European Championships
| Gold medal – first place | 2015 Erp | BMX racing |
| Silver medal – second place | 2017 Bordeaux | BMX racing |
| Silver medal – second place | 2022 Dessel | BMX racing |
| Bronze medal – third place | 2013 | BMX racing |

Elke Vanhoof (born 16 December 1991) is a former Belgian female BMX rider. She represented her nation at international competitions.

== Career ==
In 2014 Vanhoof won the European League BMX (since then renamed BMX European Cup) in the elite category . After that successful 2014 season, and with an eye on the 2016 Summer Olympics in Rio de Janeiro, Brazil, she joined the Belgian Armed Forces's elite athlete topsport program.

In June 2015, despite having posted the fastest run of the competition, Vanhoof missed out on a medal at the inaugural edition of the 2015 European Games in Baku, Azerbaijan due to a fall in the women's BMX final. Less than a month later she bounced back and won the gold medal at the European Championships in Erp, The Netherlands. At the end of July, she went on to compete in the time trial event and race event at the 2015 UCI BMX World Championships on home turf in Zolder, Belgium but failed to win a medal. She did renew her BMX European Cup title of 2014 winning it for the second year in a row.

In January 2016, Vanhoof tore the meniscus of her left knee in training but decided not to have surgery in order not to compromise her chances of going to the 2016 Summer Olympics. By reaching the final, semi-final and final resp. of the UCI BMX Racing World Cup events in Santiago del Estero (Argentina), Manchester (Great Britain) and Papendal (The Netherlands), she nonetheless managed to qualify for the 2016 Summer Olympics. At the Olympics, having qualified by for the final, Vanhoof got off to a good start but was hampered early in the race by a crash involving Frenchwoman Manon Valentino and then again impeded by a tumble from Dutchwoman Laura Smulders, and had to settle for 6th place.

Vanhoof missed five months of competition in 2019 after a fall in March during a training run in Verona, Italy for the UEC BMX European Cup event. The fall resulted in a difficult to recover from concussion and whiplash that forced her to miss the Belgian, European and World Championships that year and stopped her from scoring valuable ranking points for the 2020 Summer Olympics in Tokyo, Japan.

In July 2022, on home turf in Dessel, Belgium, and having been able to start training only three weeks before the Championships due to an elbow injury and having dealt with a corona infection a week and a half before the start, she finished second in the 2022 European BMX Championships beaten in the final only by the reigning world and Olympic champion Beth Shriever.

In June 2023, Vanhoof sustained three fractures to her spine in a fall during the 2023 UCI BMX Racing World Cup round in Papendal, The Netherlands that took her out of the European and World Championships for that year. Vanhoof returned to competition in September to ride the 2023 UCI BMX Racing World Cup rounds in Sarrians, France, and Santiago del Estero, Argentina, where she was however plagued by food poisoning.

Vanhoof started 2024 hoping to qualify for a third Olympics in a row. Those hopes were dented when in February, during the first leg of the 2024 UCI BMX Racing World Cup in Rotorua, New Zealand, she fell and broke the scaphoid bone in one of her wrists which required surgery to repair.

In December 2024 she announced her retirement from the sport as an athlete. In October 2026 however, Vanhoof announced a surprise comeback, not as a BMX rider, but as a track cyclist and that she had been selected by Belgian Cycling to represent her country at the 2026 UCI Track Cycling World Championships in Shanghai, China as starter for the women's team sprint.
