= Nadja Pries =

German BMX racer (born 1994)

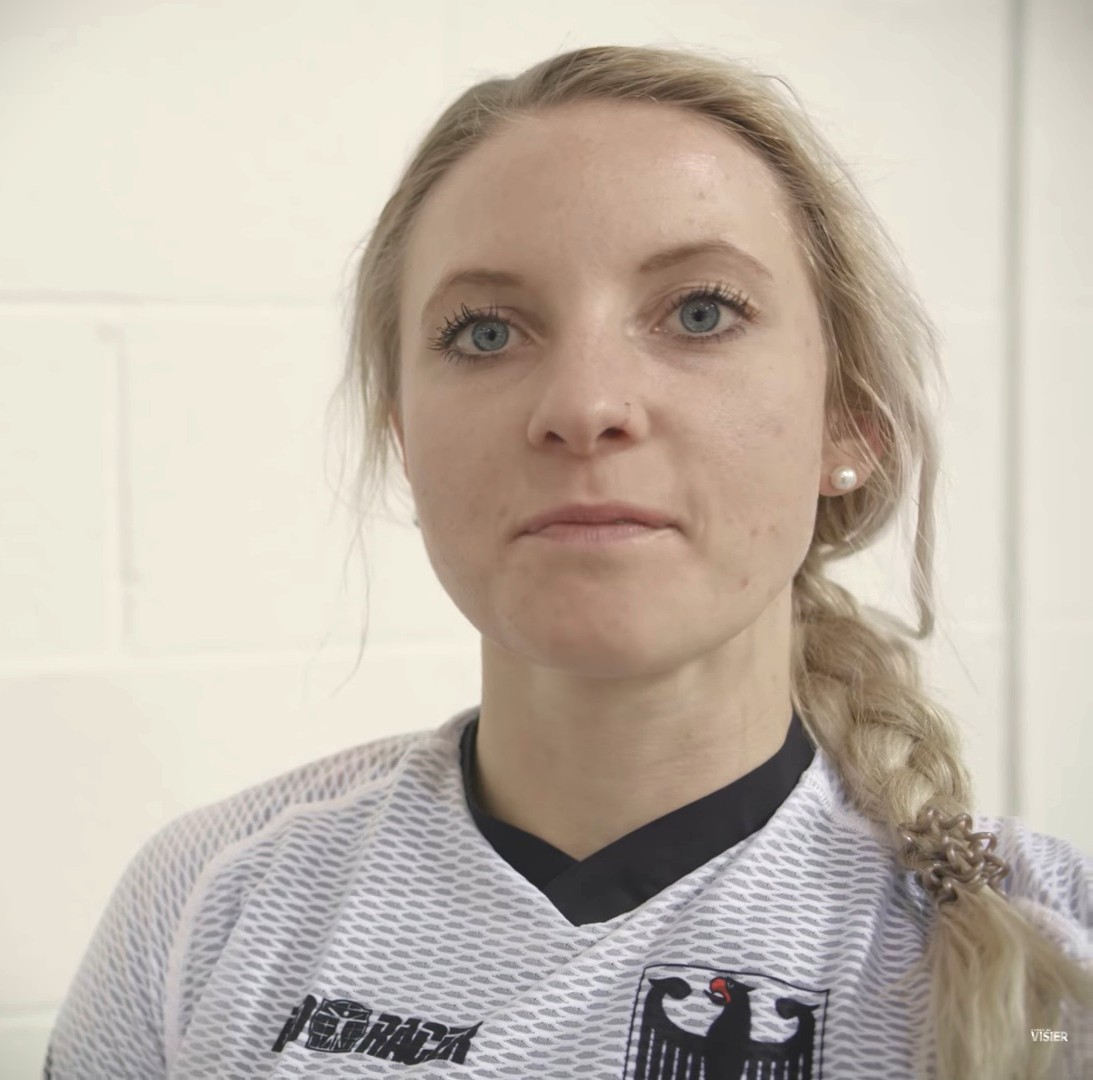
- Pries in 2020

Personal information
- Born: 20 May 1994 (age 32) Erlangen, Bavaria, Germany
- Height: 1.61 m (5 ft 3 1/2 in)
- Weight: 56 kg (123 lb)

Cycling career
- Sport: Cycling
- Discipline: BMX racing
- Role: Racer

Nadja Pries (born 20 May 1994) is a German BMX racer, representing her nation in international competitions. She competed in the time trial event and race event at the 2015 UCI BMX World Championships.

Pries was selected as part of the German cycling team for the 2016 Summer Olympics in Rio de Janeiro, competing in the women's BMX race. After she grabbed a fourteenth seed on the opening round with a time of 37.152, Pries scored a total of 19 placing points to take the penultimate spot against seven other racers in her semifinal heat, thus eliminating her from the tournament.

Before the 2016 Summer Olympics in Rio de Janeiro Pries posed together with swimmer Isabelle Härle, rower Julia Lier, table tennis player Petrissa Solja and pole vaulter Katharina Bauer for the German edition of Playboy.
