= 2013 UCI BMX World Championships =

- Venue: Auckland, New Zealand
- Date(s): 23–28 July 2013
- Events: 8

The 2013 UCI BMX World Championships were the eighteenth edition of the UCI BMX World Championships and took place in Auckland in New Zealand and crowned world champions in the cycling discipline of BMX racing.

== Medal summary ==
Event	Gold	Silver	Bronze
Men's events
Elite Men	Liam Phillips; Great Britain	Marc Willers; New Zealand	Luis Brethaueur; Germany
Junior Men	Sean Gaian; United States	Gonzalo Molina; Argentina	Jérémy Rencurel; France
Elite Men Time Trial	Connor Fields; United States	Joris Daudet; France	Sylvain André; France
Junior Men Time Trial	Romain Mahieu; France	Sean Gaian; United States	Niek Kimmann; Netherlands
Women's events
Elite Women	Caroline Buchanan; Australia	Lauren Reynolds; Australia	Manon Valentino; France
Junior Women	Felicia Stancil; United States	Shayona Glynn; United States	Hannah Sarten; New Zealand
Elite Women Time Trial	Mariana Pajón; Colombia	Alise Post; United States	Caroline Buchanan; Australia
Junior Women Time Trial	Felicia Stancil; United States	Rachel Jones; Australia	Sarah Sailer; Germany

== Medal table ==
* Host nation (New Zealand)

Rank	Nation	Gold	Silver	Bronze	Total
1	United States (USA)	4	3	0	7
2	Australia (AUS)	1	2	1	4
3	France (FRA)	1	1	3	5
4	Colombia (COL)	1	0	0	1
4	Great Britain (GBR)	1	0	0	1
6	New Zealand (NZL)*	0	1	1	2
7	Argentina (ARG)	0	1	0	1
8	Germany (GER)	0	0	2	2
9	Netherlands (NED)	0	0	1	1
Totals (9 entries)		8	8	8	24
