= Dana Sprengers =

Dutch BMX rider

Personal information
- Born: 28 July 1990 (age 36) Bergeijk

Cycling career
- Sport: Cycling
- Current team: Netherlands
- Discipline: BMX racing
- Role: Rider

Dana Sprengers (born 28 July 1990) is a Dutch female BMX rider, representing her nation at international competitions. She competed in the time trial event and race event at the 2015 UCI BMX World Championships.
