= Ketlin Tekkel =

Estonian BMX rider

Personal information
- Born: 20 December 1996 (age 29)

Cycling career
- Sport: Cycling
- Current team: Estonia
- Discipline: BMX racing
- Role: Rider

Ketlin Tekkel (born 20 December 1996) is an Estonian female BMX rider, representing her nation at international competitions. She competed in the time trial event and race event at the 2015 UCI BMX World Championships.
