= Teagan O'Keeffe =

South African cyclist

Personal information
- Born: 10 November 1992 (age 33)

Cycling career
- Sport: Cycling
- Discipline: BMX racing
- Role: Rider
Medal record
Women's BMX racing
Representing South Africa
World Junior Championships
Gold medal – first place	2010 Pietermaritzburg	BMX cruiser

Teagan O'Keeffe (born 10 November 1992) is a South African BMX rider, representing her nation at international competitions.

She competed in the time trial event and race event at the 2015 UCI BMX World Championships.
