= Charlotte Green (BMX rider) =

British cyclist (born 1994)

Personal information
- Born: 16 May 1994 (age 32)

Cycling career
- Sport: Cycling
- Current team: Great Britain
- Discipline: BMX racing
- Role: Rider

Charlotte Green (born 16 May 1994) is an English female BMX rider, from Threemilestone, near Truro, Cornwall. She has represented Great Britain at international competitions. She competed in the time trial event and race event at the 2015 UCI BMX World Championships.
