= Mathilde Doudoux =

French BMX rider (born 1996)

- thumb

Personal information
- Born: 28 December 1996 (age 29) Mulhouse, France
- Height: 160 cm (5 ft 3 in)
- Weight: 56 kg (123 lb)

Cycling career
- Sport: Cycling
- Discipline: BMX racing
- Role: Rider

thumb Mathilde Doudoux (born 28 December 1996) is a French BMX rider, representing her nation at international competitions. She competed in the time trial event and race event at the 2015 UCI BMX World Championships.
