= Bianca Quinalha =

Brazilian BMX rider

Personal information
- Full name: Bianca Ijano Quinal
- Born: 3 October 1993 (age 33)

Cycling career
- Sport: Cycling
- Current team: Brazil
- Discipline: BMX racing
- Role: Rider
Medal record
Women's BMX racing
Representing Brazil
World Junior Championships
Bronze medal – third place	2010 Pietermaritzburg	BMX cruiser

Bianca Ijano Quinalha (Note: This name uses Portuguese naming customs: the first or maternal family name is Ijano and the second or paternal family name is Quinalha.) (born 3 October 1993) is a Brazilian female BMX rider, representing her nation at international competitions. She competed in the time trial event and race event at the 2015 UCI BMX World Championships.
