= Payton Ridenour =

American BMX cyclist

Personal information
- Nickname: "P-Nut"
- Born: May 29, 2002 (age 24)
- Height: 5 ft 6 in (168 cm)

Cycling career
- Sport: Cycling
- Current team: Mongoose Bicycles
- Discipline: BMX racing

Payton Ridenour (/ˈraɪdənaʊər/ RY-də-now-ər; born May 29, 2002) is an American female BMX rider.

== Cycling career ==
She is a seven-time BMX national champion who qualified to compete in the 2020 Summer Olympics. She was the youngest competitor in her event, in which she finished 17th. In May 2021, she earned her first BMX Supercross World Cup podium, a second place finish in Bogotá, Colombia.

== Personal life ==
Ridenour is an only child. Her father, Keith is a former amateur BMX racer.

Ridenour has published a children's book.
