= Odyssey BMX =

Odyssey BMX is an American bicycle parts company based in Norwalk, California specializing in BMX. Founded in 1985, one of its first products was the Gyro detangler, which is still in production today. The term “Gyro” is a registered trademark owned by Odyssey. The product line currently includes almost all parts necessary to build a BMX bike except frames.

In 2005 the company won a design distinction award from ID magazine for the Elementary stem which gained a US patent and challenged the prevalent stem design of the time which used 6 bolts and replaced them with a single bolt controlling an internal expander. The Elementary stem was a collaboration with George French of G-Sport and in the course of this project Odyssey BMX absorbed G-Sport.

In 2009 Odyssey launched the Ratchet hub under the G-Sport brand.

In 2005 and 2009 The Odyssey Catalogue was featured in Print Magazine's Regional Design Annual.

Aaron Ross has a signature grip which has gained wider interest.

The company has many distributors across its American domestic market and a further 44 worldwide.

The Pro team as of 2010 includes Aaron Ross, Perris Benegas, Dennis Enarson, Tom Dugan, Boyd Hilder, Gary Young, Broc Raiford, Corey Walsh, Matt Nordstrom, Jacob Cable, Justin Spriet. The Race team includes Nic Long, Daleny Vaughn, Tanner Sebesta and Jim Bauer.
