= Sandie Thibaut =

French cyclist

Personal information
- Born: 2 August 1996 (age 30) Dijon, France

Cycling career
- Sport: Cycling
- Current team: France
- Discipline: BMX racing
- Role: Rider

Sandie Thibaut (born 2 August 1996) is a French female BMX rider, representing her nation at international competitions. She competed in the time trial event and race event at the 2015 UCI BMX World Championships.
