= Haruka Seko =

Japanese BMX rider

Personal information
- Born: 9 December 1996 (age 29) Hokkaido, Japan

Cycling career
- Sport: Cycling
- Current team: Japan
- Discipline: BMX racing
- Role: Rider

Haruka Seko (瀬古 遥加, Seko Haruka; born 9 December 1996) is a Japanese female BMX rider, representing her nation at international competitions. She competed in the time trial event and race event at the 2015 UCI BMX World Championships.
