= 2016 UCI BMX World Championships =

- Venue: Medellín, Colombia
- Date: 25–29 May 2016
- Stadium: Complejo Mariana Pajón
- Nations participating: 39
- Cyclists participating: 208
- Events: 8

The 2016 UCI BMX World Championships was the twenty-first edition of the UCI BMX World Championships, which took place over 25–29 May 2016 in Medellín, Colombia to crown World champions in the cycling discipline of BMX racing.

== Medal summary ==
Event	Gold		Silver		Bronze	
Men's events
Elite Men	Joris Daudet; France	36.737	Niek Kimmann; Netherlands	36.785	Nicholas Long; United States	38.380
Junior Men	Maynard Peel; New Zealand	38.931	Mathis Ragot Richard; France	39.291	Cédric Butti; Switzerland	39.551
Elite Men Time Trial	Niek Kimmann; Netherlands	36.858	Sam Willoughby; Australia	36.895	Māris Štrombergs; Latvia	37.100
Junior Men Time Trial	Mathis Ragot Richard; France	38.494	Andrew Hughes; Australia	38.613	Charles Borel; France	38.679
Women's events
Elite Women	Mariana Pajón; Colombia	41.385	Caroline Buchanan; Australia	42.312	Alise Post; United States	42.861
Junior Women	Ruby Huisman; Netherlands	45.664	Natalia Afremova; Russia	46.295	Silje Fiskebekk; Norway	46.541
Elite Women Time Trial	Caroline Buchanan; Australia	41.641	Laura Smulders; Netherlands	41.942	Mariana Pajón; Colombia	41.983
Junior Women Time Trial	Merel Smulders; Netherlands	44.494	Beth Shriever; Great Britain	44.733	Ruby Huisman; Netherlands	44.832

== Medal table ==
* Host nation (Colombia)

Rank	Nation	Gold	Silver	Bronze	Total
1	Netherlands (NED)	3	2	1	6
2	France (FRA)	2	1	1	4
3	Australia (AUS)	1	3	0	4
4	Colombia (COL)*	1	0	1	2
5	New Zealand (NZL)	1	0	0	1
6	Great Britain (GBR)	0	1	0	1
6	Russia (RUS)	0	1	0	1
8	United States (USA)	0	0	2	2
9	Latvia (LAT)	0	0	1	1
9	Norway (NOR)	0	0	1	1
9	Switzerland (SUI)	0	0	1	1
Totals (11 entries)		8	8	8	24
