= Simone Christensen =

Danish BMX rider (born 1994)

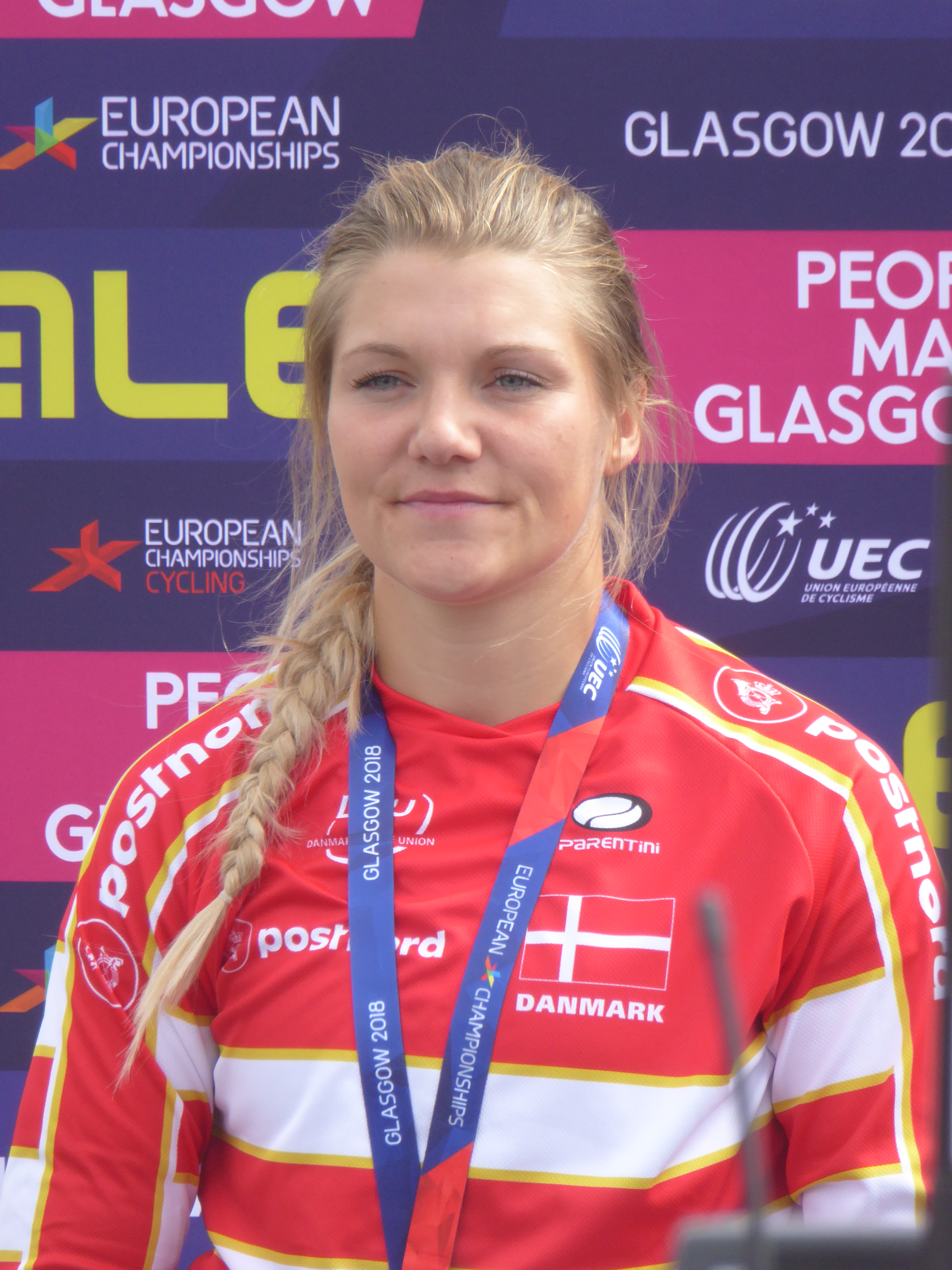
- Christensen at the 2018 European BMX Championships

Personal information
- Full name: Simone Tetsche Christensen
- Born: 10 February 1994 (age 32) Aarhus, Denmark

Cycling career
- Sport: Cycling
- Current team: Retired
- Discipline: BMX racing
- Role: Rider
Medal record
Women's BMX racing
Representing Denmark
Event	1st	2nd	3rd
World Championships	0	0	1
World Junior Championships	0	0	1
World Cup	0	0	2
World Cup rounds	1	3	2
European Games	1	0	0
European Championships	0	2	3
European Junior Championships	0	1	1
Total	2	6	10
World Championships
Bronze medal – third place	2015 Heusden-Zolder	BMX racing
World Cup
Bronze medal – third place	2016	BMX racing
Bronze medal – third place	2017	BMX racing
European Games
Gold medal – first place	2015 Baku	BMX racing
European Championships
Silver medal – second place	2015 Erp	BMX racing
Silver medal – second place	2018 Glasgow	BMX racing
Bronze medal – third place	2014 Roskilde	BMX racing
Bronze medal – third place	2017 Bordeaux	BMX racing
Bronze medal – third place	2019 Valmiera	BMX racing
World Junior Championships
Bronze medal – third place	2012 Birmingham	BMX time trial
European Junior Championships
Silver medal – second place	2011–12	BMX racing
Bronze medal – third place	2011	BMX racing

Simone Tetsche Christensen (born 10 February 1994) is a Danish former BMX rider, who represented her nation at international competitions. She won the gold medal in the women's event at the 2015 European Games. She competed in the time trial event and race event at the 2015 UCI BMX World Championships. She won a silver medal in the 2018 European BMX Championships.

She retired from the sport in April 2022.
