= Caroline Buchanan =

Australian cyclist

Personal information
- Nickname: Caro
- Nationality: Australian
- Born: 24 October 1990 (age 36) Canberra, Australia
- Height: 165 cm (5 ft 5 in)
- Weight: 68 kg (150 lb)
- Website: www.carolinebuchanan.com

Sport
- Country: Australia
- Sport: Cycling
- Events: BMX racing Mountain biking

Achievements and titles
- Olympic finals: London 2012 Olympic Finalist
- World finals: 5 x BMX and Mountain Bike World Champion
Medal record
Representing Australia
Women's BMX racing
Event	1st	2nd	3rd
World Championships	3	5	1
World Cup	2	1	0
World Cup rounds	10	3	2
Oceania Championships	3	2	1
Total	18	11	4
World Championships
Gold medal – first place	2012 Birmingham	BMX time trial
Gold medal – first place	2013 Auckland	BMX racing
Gold medal – first place	2016 Medellín	BMX time trial
Silver medal – second place	2011 Copenhagen	BMX time trial
Silver medal – second place	2014 Rotterdam	BMX time trial
Silver medal – second place	2015 Heusden-Zolder	BMX racing
Silver medal – second place	2016 Medellín	BMX racing
Silver medal – second place	2017 Rock Hill	BMX racing
Bronze medal – third place	2013 Auckland	BMX time trial
World Cup
Gold medal – first place	2012	BMX racing
Gold medal – first place	2014	BMX racing
Silver medal – second place	2010	BMX racing
Oceania Championships
Gold medal – first place	2012 Nerang	BMX racing
Gold medal – first place	2013 Brisbane	BMX racing
Gold medal – first place	2014 Shepparton	BMX racing
Silver medal – second place	2015 Brisbane	BMX racing
Silver medal – second place	2016 Auckland	BMX racing
Bronze medal – third place	2011 Pukekohe	BMX racing

Caroline Buchanan (born 24 October 1990) is an Australian cyclist who has won multiple world championships in BMX racing and mountain biking. She represented Australia at the 2012 and 2016 Summer Olympics in the women's BMX event.

== Early life ==
Nicknamed Caro, Caroline Buchanan was born on 24 October 1990 in Canberra, Australia. She attended Duffy Primary School, and later Merici College and Erindale College.

== Cycling career ==
Buchanan represents Australia in BMX and mountain biking. She has been coached by Wade Bootes since 2007. Her primary training base is on Queensland's Gold Coast. She has a cycling scholarship with the ACT Academy of Sport. She is a member of the Tuggeranong Vikings BMX Club. She is 11× time Australian champion in BMX, in 2011 World Championships Buchanan won silver medal at time trial. She is also the 2009 and 2010 4-X Champion. She has earned the Australian Female Mountain bike rider of the year title three times.

While Buchanan was one of the best Australian BMX riders in 2008, she was not eligible for the Olympics because of her age. Following the 2008 issue, she added mountain biking to her cycling disciplines.

During 2012, Buchanan was focused on BMX and earning an Olympic spot in the discipline. In 2012, she won a round of the Supercross, becoming the first Australian woman to do so. She had the two fastest runs at the 2012 time trial event at the World Championships in Birmingham, England. In May 2012, she was ranked the number one women's BMX rider in the world. She was selected to represent Australia at the 2012 Summer Olympics in the women's BMX event.

In September 2013, Buchanan won the elite women's title at the UCI World Four Cross Championships in Leogang, Austria. She beat Anneke Beerten (Netherlands) the defending world champion. In July Buchanan also won the UCI BMX World Championships in New Zealand. In 2013, she won the Sir Hubert Opperman Trophy for Australia's best all-round cyclist. She was the first person competing in BMX or mountain bike to win the award.

In May 2016, Buchanan won the Elite Women's Time Trial at the World BMX Championships in Colombia and was second to Mariana Pajón in the Elite Women's BMX race.

Buchanan qualified second in the seeding at the 2016 Summer Olympics. However, she crashed during one of the semi-final rounds and did not qualify for the final.

Since recovering from an accident in December 2017 she has started to compete in freestyle BMX events. In October 2019 she joined the Ride Concepts team. She is aiming to compete in BMX in the 2020 Tokyo Olympics.

== Personal life ==
In September 2016, Buchanan became engaged to American BMX rider Barry Nobles and they married in September 2018.

In late December, 2017, Buchanan was involved in an off-road vehicle accident. She suffered serious injuries, including a collapsed lung and spent time in an intensive care unit.

== Results ==
2009
1st UCI Four Cross World Championship
2010
1st UCI Four Cross World Championship
2nd BMX World Cup
2011
2nd Elite Time Trial BMX World Championships
2012
1st Elite Time Trial BMX World Championships
1st BMX World Cup
5th London Olympics BMX
2013
1st UCI Four Cross World Championship
1st Elite BMX World Championships
3rd Elite Time Trial BMX World Championships
2014
1st BMX World Cup
1st Elite National Championships
2nd Elite time trial BMX World Championships
2015
1st Elite National Championships
2nd Elite Oceania Championships
2nd Elite BMX World Championships
2016
1st UCI Four Cross World Championship
1st Elite Time Trial BMX World Championships
2nd Elite BMX World Championships
2nd Elite Oceania Championships
Semi-finals Rio de Janeiro Olympics BMX
2017
1st UCI Four Cross World Championship
1st Elite National Championships
2nd Elite BMX World Championships
2019
1st General Classification Banyuwangi International BMX

Awards and achievements
Preceded by Alicia Coutts and Tom Slingsby	Australian Athlete of the Year; 2013 (with Kim Crow)	Succeeded by Jessica Fox
