= Sarah Harvey =

Australian BMX rider

Personal information
- Born: 31 August 1995 (age 31)

Cycling career
- Sport: Cycling
- Current team: Australia
- Discipline: BMX racing
- Role: Rider

Sarah Harvey (born 31 August 1995) is an Australian female BMX rider, representing her nation at international competitions. She competed in the time trial event and race event at the 2015 UCI BMX World Championships.
