= Corben Sharrah =

American BMX cyclist

Personal information
- Born: April 20, 1992 (age 34) Tucson, Arizona, U.S.
- Height: 6 ft 0 in (183 cm)
- Weight: 188 lb (85 kg)

Cycling career
- Sport: Cycling
- Current team: Daylight Cycles
- Discipline: BMX racing
- Role: Professional BMX Racer

Major wins
- Olympic Trials Champion in 2016
Medal record
Men's BMX racing
Representing United States
World Championships
Gold medal – first place	2017 Rock Hill	BMX racing
Silver medal – second place	2014 Rotterdam	BMX time trial
World Cup
Gold medal – first place	2016	BMX racing

Corben Sharrah (born April 20, 1992) is an American male BMX rider, representing his nation at international competitions. He competed in the time trial event at the 2015 UCI BMX World Championships.

He has qualified to represent the United States at the 2020 Summer Olympics.
