= Sandra Aleksejeva =

Latvian BMX racer

Personal information
- Nationality: Latvian
- Born: 3 May 1991 (age 34); Krāslava, Latvia
- Height: 1.65 m (5 ft 5 in)
- Weight: 55 kg (121 lb)

Sport
- Country: Latvia
- Sport: BMX Racing

Sandra Aleksejeva (born 3 May 1991) is a Latvian BMX racer. She competed at the 2012 Summer Olympics in London, reaching the semi-final. Aleksejeva has participated in several European and World Championships. Aleksejeva was born in Krāslava, Latvia.
