= Alise Willoughby =

American cyclist (born 1991)

Alise Willoughby OLY
Personal information
- Full name: Alise Rose Willoughby
- Nickname: "The Beast"
- Born: Alise Rose Post; January 17, 1991 (age 35) St. Cloud, Minnesota, U.S.
- Height: 5 ft 2 in (158 cm)
- Weight: 117 lb (53 kg)

Cycling career
- Sport: Cycling
- Current team: Daylight Cycles / Toyota
- Discipline: Bicycle Motocross (BMX)
- Role: Rider

Amateur teams
- 2000: Fly
- 2001-2003: Staats/TBS
- 2003-2004: Avent/Bombshell
- 2004-2005: Hyper Bicycles
- 2005-2006: CMC Inc.

Professional teams
- 2006: CMC Inc.
- 2006-2008: Formula Bicycle/Monster Factory
- 2009-2016: Redline Bicycles
- 2017-present: GW / Toyota Daylight Cycles
Medal record
Representing United States
Women's BMX racing
Event	1st	2nd	3rd
Olympic Games	0	1	0
World Championships	3	3	3
World Cup	1	0	4
World Cup rounds	5	17	13
Total	9	21	20
Olympic Games
Silver medal – second place	2016 Rio de Janeiro	BMX racing
World Championships
Gold medal – first place	2017 Rock Hill	BMX racing
Gold medal – first place	2019 Heusden-Zolder	BMX racing
Gold medal – first place	2024 Rock Hill	BMX racing
Silver medal – second place	2013 Auckland	BMX time trial
Silver medal – second place	2014 Rotterdam	BMX racing
Silver medal – second place	2015 Heusden-Zolder	BMX time trial
Bronze medal – third place	2010 Pietermaritzburg	BMX racing
Bronze medal – third place	2016 Medellín	BMX racing
Bronze medal – third place	2023 Glasgow	BMX racing
World Cup
Gold medal – first place	2020	BMX racing
Bronze medal – third place	2012	BMX racing
Bronze medal – third place	2015	BMX racing
Bronze medal – third place	2019	BMX racing
Bronze medal – third place	2024	BMX racing

Alise Rose Willoughby (née Post, born January 17, 1991) is an American professional "Current School" BMX racing racer who has been racing competitively since 2002. She uses the moniker "The Beast".

== Career ==
Originally a state-champion gymnast, Willoughby began racing at the age of six, after watching her older brothers race.

She turned professional in 2006, at the age of 15. Her first professional race result came in April, when she placed third at the American Bicycle Association Winter Nationals. Her first professional win came just one month later, when she won the ABA Super Nationals. She was voted 2006 Rookie Pro of the Year by the readers of BMXer magazine, becoming the first female to win the title. She was also the youngest female to hold the National No.1 Pro Women's title, one of the youngest BMX racers to turn pro, one of the youngest to hold a pro title, and the first female to earn all three Girls division classifications.

In 2008, BMX Racing was added to the Olympics, but the 19 years age minimum meant Willoughby, age 17, was unable to compete.

Willoughby would go on to make her Olympic Debut at the 2012 Summer Olympics, after recovering from surgery for LCL, knee and hamstring reconstruction. She placed 12th after a crash in the semi-final.

Willoughby entered the 2020 Summer Olympics (held in 2021) as a reigning world champion and 2016 silver medalist but suffered a hearbreaking crash and did not qualify for the final.

== Major results ==
=== Amateur (Note: Listed are District, State/Provincial/Department, Regional, National, and International titles in italics. Depending on point totals of individual racers, winners of Grand Nationals do not necessarily win National titles. Only sanctioning bodies active during the racer's career are listed. Series and one off Championships are also listed in block.) ===
==== American Bicycle Association ====
===== 20 inch =====
- 1999,'00,'01,'02,'03,'04 Minnesota District 6 (MN-06) No.1
- 1999,'00,'02,'03,'04 Minnesota State Champion
- 2000,'01,'02,'03,'04 Central Region Redline Cup Champion
- 2000 9 Girls National Age Group (NAG) No.1
- 2000 9 Girls Race of Champions (ROC) Champion
- 2001 10 Girls NAG No.1
- 2002 11 Girls NAG No.1
- 2002 11 Girls ROC Champion
- 2002 11 Girls Grandnational Champion
- 2002 Girls National No.2
- 2003 12 Girls World Champion
- 2003 12 Girls NAG No.1
- 2003 12 Girls ROC Champion
- 2003 12 Girls Grandnational Champion
- 2003 Girls National No.2
- 2004 13 Girls NAG No.1
- 2004 13 Girls ROC Champion
- 2001,'04 National No.1 Girl

===== Cruiser =====
- 2000,'01,'02,'03,'04 Cruiser Minnesota District 6 (MN-06) No.1
- 2002,'03'04 Minnesota State Cruiser Champion
- 2000,'01 10 & Under Girls Cruiser Redline Cup Central Region Champion
- 2002,03,'04 11-13 Girls Cruiser Central Regional Redline Cup Champion
- 2001 10 & Under National Age Group (NAG) Girls Cruiser No.1
- 2002,'03,'04 11-13 National Age Group (NAG) Girls Cruiser No.1
- 2002,'03 Race of Champions Cruiser Champion.
- 2003,'04 National No.1 Girl Cruiser

==== Union Cycliste Internationale (UCI) ====
- 2001,'02,'03,'04 World Champion
- 2001,'04 Cruiser World Champion
- 2007 15-16 Girls Cruiser World Champion (Note: Although Alise Post was a pro in the ABA at the time of the 2007 UCI World Championships, under UCI rules she was too young to qualify for Elite women status.)

=== Professional ===
==== American Bicycle Association (ABA) ====
- 2006, '07 National No.1 Pro Women

==== Union Cycliste Internationale (UCI) ====
- 2017, '19, '24 Elite Women World Champion

==== USA Cycling ====
- 2010 Elite Women Second Place National Champion

==== World Cup ====
- 2020 Gold Medalist
- 2012, '15, '19, '24 Bronze Medalist

==== World Championships ====
- 2017, '19, '24 Gold Medalist
- 2014 Silver Medalist
- 2010, '16, '23 Bronze Medalist

==== Olympics ====
- Rio 2016 Silver Medalist

== Personal life ==
In December 2015 Sam Willoughby proposed to Alise. Sam had a training incident in 2016 that forced him to retire, after which he became Alise's coach. They were married in January 2019.
