= Sam Willoughby =

Australian former BMX racing cyclist

Personal information
- Born: 15 August 1991 (age 35) Bedford Park, Australia
- Height: 1.73 m (5 ft 8 in)
- Weight: 87 kg (192 lb)

Cycling career
- Sport: Cycling
- Current team: Redline Bicycles
- Discipline: BMX (bicycle motocross)
- Role: Rider
Medal record
Men's BMX racing
Representing Australia
Olympic Games
| Silver medal – second place | 2012 London | BMX racing |
World Championships
| Gold medal – first place | 2012 Birmingham | BMX racing |
| Gold medal – first place | 2014 Rotterdam | BMX racing |
| Gold medal – first place | 2014 Rotterdam | BMX time trial |
World Cup
| Gold medal – first place | 2009 | BMX racing |
| Gold medal – first place | 2012 | BMX racing |
| Silver medal – second place | 2010 | BMX racing |

Sam Willoughby (born 15 August 1991 in Bedford Park, South Australia) is an Australian former BMX racing cyclist. He won an Olympic silver medal in 2012. He suffered a career-ending injury in 2016 and has since worked on his own rehabilitation, and as his wife's coach.

== BMX career ==
Willoughby, also known as 'the BMX bandit', left his Adelaide home at age 16 with a backpack, a meagre bank account balance and his BMX bike for California. He stayed at the home of fellow cyclists until he earned enough money from racing to afford a room in a motel. He won the junior BMX title in 2008 and again in 2009. Willoughby advanced into the senior ranks within two years of his arrival. Willoughby supports educating children about bicycle education through the Happiness Cycle.

He won his first senior BMX world championship in May 2012, which advanced his ranking to the number one spot in the world. He competed in the men's BMX at the 2012 Summer Olympics, winning a silver medal.

In 2012, he won the Australian Institute of Sport Junior Athlete of the Year Award.

Willoughby became engaged to American BMX rider Alise Post in 2015.

In the men's BMX at the 2016 Summer Olympics, Willoughby won his semi-final, but finished sixth in the final.

== Post injury ==
On 10 September 2016, Willoughby was declared a tetraplegic after a training run crash at Chula Vista BMX track.

29 March 2018 he rode his BMX bike first time after his crash, still unable to walk.

In January 2019, Willoughby and Post married. Willoughby stood up on his own legs (with braces) to dance with his new wife.

As of 2021, Sam and Alise Willoughby live in Chula Vista, California; and Sam is his wife's coach.
