= María Belén Dutto =

Argentine BMX rider (born 1987)

Personal information
- Born: 22 May 1987 (age 39) Alta Gracia, Córdoba, Argentina
- Height: 1.70 m (5 ft 7 in)
- Weight: 67 kg (148 lb)

Cycling career
- Sport: Cycling
- Discipline: Bicycle motocross (BMX)
- Role: Rider

María Belén Dutto (born 22 May 1987 in Alta Gracia, Córdoba) is an Argentine amateur BMX cyclist. Being profoundly deaf since birth with a 98% hearing loss, Dutto represented her nation Argentina at the 2008 Summer Olympics, and also managed to surmount her physical handicap by taking home the gold medal at the 2009 BMX Latin American Championships in São Paulo, Brazil.

Dutto qualified for the Argentine squad, along with her teammate and three-time world champion Gabriela Díaz, in women's BMX cycling at the 2008 Summer Olympics in Beijing by receiving one of the nation's two available berths based on her top-ten performance from the UCI BMX World Rankings. After she grabbed a fourteenth seed on the morning prelims with a time of 40.193, Dutto scored a total of 20 placing points to take the seventh spot in the semifinals, thus eliminating her from the tournament.
