= Merle van Benthem =

Dutch BMX rider (born 1992)

Personal information
- Born: 7 December 1992 (age 33) Hengelo

Cycling career
- Sport: Cycling
- Discipline: BMX racing
- Role: Rider

Merle van Benthem (born 7 December 1992) is a Dutch BMX rider, representing her nation at international competitions. She competed in the time trial event and race event at the 2015 UCI BMX World Championships.
