= Squel Stein =

Brazilian BMX cyclist

Personal information
- Full name: Squel Sauane Stein
- Born: 7 September 1991 (age 34) Ibirama, Santa Catarina, Brazil
- Height: 156 cm (5 ft 1 in)
- Weight: 53 kg (117 lb)

Sport
- Sport: Cycling
- Event: BMX (bicycle motocross)

Squel Sauane Stein (Note: This name uses Portuguese naming customs: the first or maternal family name is Sauane and the second or paternal family name is Stein.) (born 7 September 1991) is a Brazilian racing cyclist who represents Brazil in BMX. She was selected to represent Brazil at the 2012 Summer Olympics in the women's BMX event in which she received a serious injury to her arm resulting in her elimination from the event.
