= Stefany Hernández =

Venezuelan cyclist (born 1991)

Stefany Hernández OLY
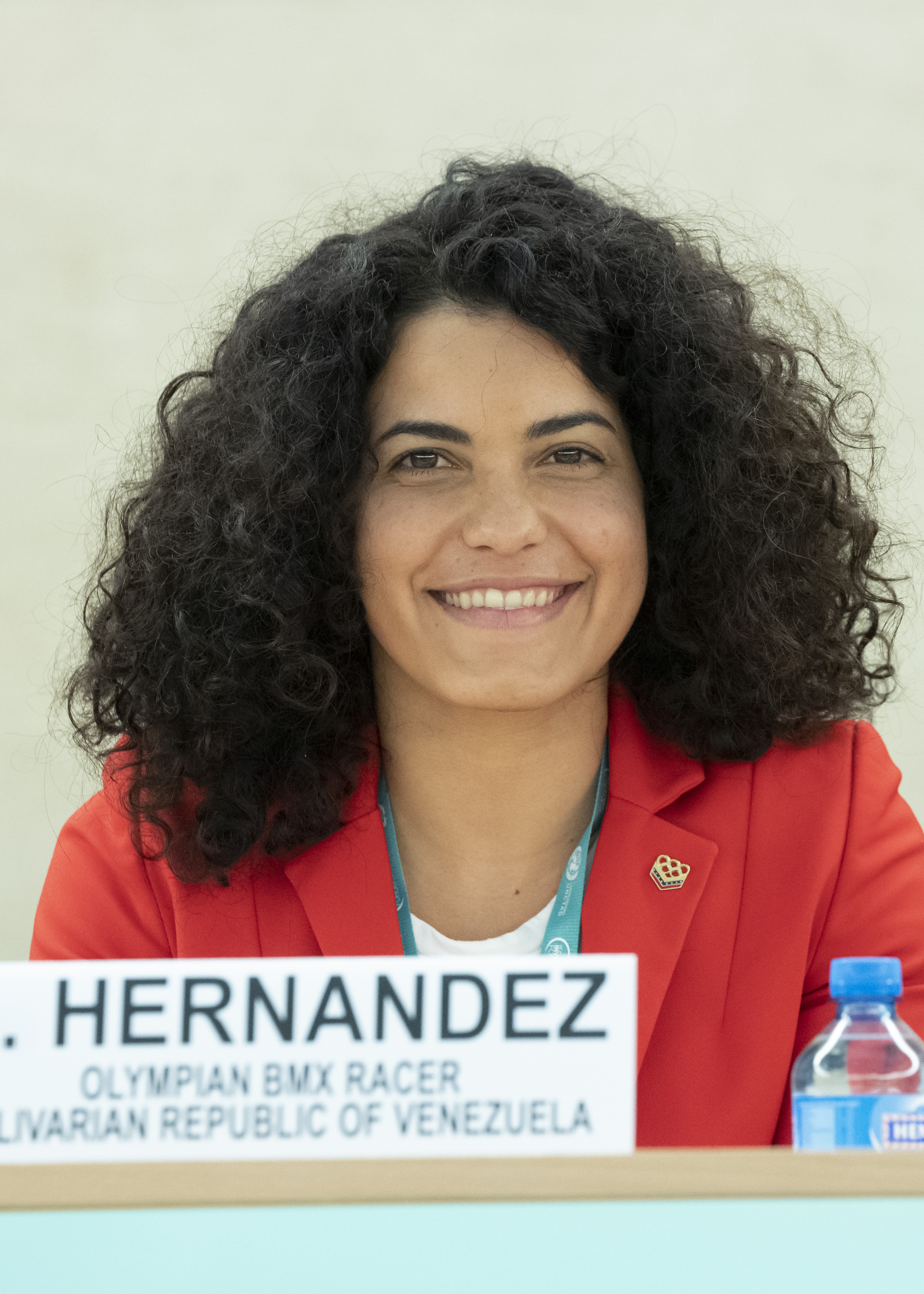
- Hernandez

Personal information
- Full name: Stefany Hernández Mendoza
- Nickname: "La Brujita"
- Born: 13 June 1991 (age 35) Ciudad Guayana, Venezuela
- Height: 1.65 m (5 ft 5 in)
- Weight: 65 kg (143 lb)

Cycling career
- Sport: Cycling
- Current team: Venezuela
- Discipline: BMX racing
- Role: Rider
Medal record
Representing Venezuela
Women's BMX racing
Event	1st	2nd	3rd
Olympic Games	0	0	1
World Championships	1	0	0
World Cup	0	1	0
World Cup rounds	0	2	6
Pan American Games	0	0	1
Pan American Championships	0	1	1
Pan American Junior Championships	0	1	0
CAC Games	0	2	0
South American Games	0	2	1
Bolivarian Games	1	3	2
Total	2	12	12
Olympic Games
Bronze medal – third place	2016 Rio de Janeiro	BMX racing
World Championships
Gold medal – first place	2015 Heusden-Zolder	BMX racing
World Cup
Silver medal – second place	2015	BMX racing
Pan American Games
Bronze medal – third place	2019 Lima	BMX racing
Pan American Championships
Silver medal – second place	2015 Santiago	BMX racing
Bronze medal – third place	2011 Bello	BMX racing
Central American and Caribbean Games
Silver medal – second place	2010 Mayagüez	BMX racing
Silver medal – second place	2014 Veracruz	BMX racing
South American Games
Silver medal – second place	2010 Medellín	BMX cruiser
Silver medal – second place	2014 Santiago	BMX racing
Bronze medal – third place	2014 Santiago	BMX time trial
Bolivarian Games
Gold medal – first place	2009 Sucre	BMX racing
Silver medal – second place	2009 Sucre	BMX cruiser
Silver medal – second place	2013 Trujillo	BMX racing
Silver medal – second place	2013 Trujillo	BMX time trial
Bronze medal – third place	2017 Santa Marta	BMX racing
Bronze medal – third place	2017 Santa Marta	BMX time trial
Pan American Junior Championships
Silver medal – second place	2009 Pasto	BMX racing

Stefany Hernández (born 13 June 1991) is a Venezuelan racing cyclist who represents Venezuela in BMX racing. She represented Venezuela at the 2012 Summer Olympics in the women's BMX racing event. She was fifth in her semifinal heat and not succeed to qualify into the final. Her final standing was ninth. She became BMX World Champion on 25 July 2015 at Zolder, Belgium.

She competed at the 2016 Summer Olympic in Rio de Janeiro in the women's BMX event. She won the bronze medal with a time of 34.755. She was the flag bearer for Venezuela during the closing ceremony.
