= Mariana Pajón =

Colombian cyclist (born 1991)

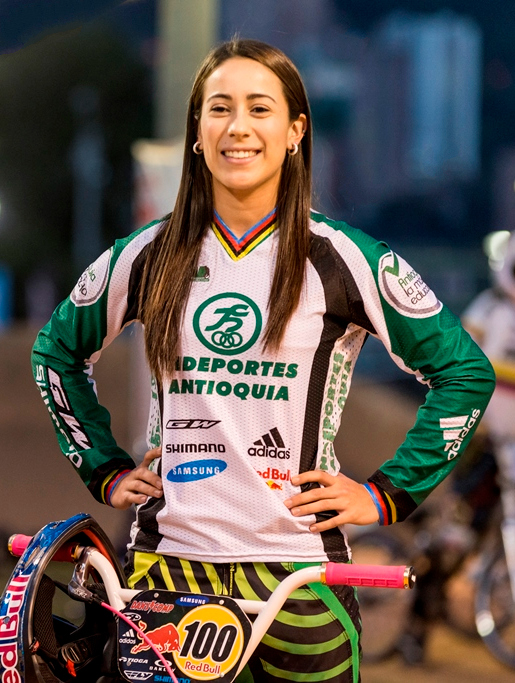
- Pajón in 2013

Personal information
- Full name: Mariana Pajón Londoño
- Nicknames: "Tata", "Queen of BMX"
- Born: 10 October 1991 (age 35) Medellín, Colombia
- Height: 1.58 m (5 ft 2 in)
- Weight: 53 kg (117 lb)

Cycling career
- Sport: Cycling
- Current team: Colombia
- Disciplines: BMX racing; Track cycling
- Role: Rider
Medal record
Representing Colombia
Event	1st	2nd	3rd
Olympic Games	2	1	0
World Championships	6	0	4
World Junior Championships	3	0	0
World Cup	3	2	1
World Cup rounds	14	8	6
Pan American Games	3	0	0
Pan American Championships	10	0	0
CAC Games	3	0	0
South American Games	6	0	0
Bolivarian Games	8	0	0
Total	58	11	11
Women's BMX racing
Olympic Games
Gold medal – first place	2012 London	BMX racing
Gold medal – first place	2016 Rio de Janeiro	BMX racing
Silver medal – second place	2020 Tokyo	BMX racing
World Championships
Gold medal – first place	2010 Pietermaritzburg	BMX cruiser
Gold medal – first place	2011 Copenhagen	BMX racing
Gold medal – first place	2013 Auckland	BMX time trial
Gold medal – first place	2014 Rotterdam	BMX racing
Gold medal – first place	2015 Heusden-Zolder	BMX time trial
Gold medal – first place	2016 Medellín	BMX racing
Bronze medal – third place	2011 Copenhagen	BMX time trial
Bronze medal – third place	2014 Rotterdam	BMX time trial
Bronze medal – third place	2016 Medellín	BMX time trial
Bronze medal – third place	2017 Rock Hill	BMX racing
World Cup
Gold medal – first place	2013	BMX racing
Gold medal – first place	2015	BMX racing
Gold medal – first place	2021	BMX racing
Silver medal – second place	2014	BMX racing
Silver medal – second place	2017	BMX racing
Bronze medal – third place	2011	BMX racing
Pan American Games
Gold medal – first place	2011 Gualadajara	BMX racing
Gold medal – first place	2019 Lima	BMX racing
Gold medal – first place	2023 Santiago	BMX racing
Pan American Championships
Gold medal – first place	2010 Quito	BMX cruiser
Gold medal – first place	2010 Quito	BMX racing
Gold medal – first place	2011 Bello	BMX racing
Gold medal – first place	2013 Santiago del Estero	BMX racing
Gold medal – first place	2015 Santiago	BMX racing
Gold medal – first place	2016 Santiago del Estero	BMX racing
Gold medal – first place	2019 Americana	BMX racing
Gold medal – first place	2021 Lima	BMX racing
Gold medal – first place	2022 Santiago del Estero	BMX racing
Gold medal – first place	2024 Bogotá	BMX racing
Central American and Caribbean Games
Gold medal – first place	2010 Mayagüez	BMX racing
Gold medal – first place	2014 Veracruz	BMX racing
Gold medal – first place	2023 San Salvador	BMX racing
South American Games
Gold medal – first place	2010 Medellín	BMX cruiser
Gold medal – first place	2010 Medellín	BMX racing
Gold medal – first place	2014 Santiago	BMX racing
Gold medal – first place	2014 Santiago	BMX time trial
Gold medal – first place	2022 Asunción	BMX racing
Bolivarian Games
Gold medal – first place	2005 Armenia-Pereira	BMX cruiser
Gold medal – first place	2009 Sucre	BMX cruiser
Gold medal – first place	2013 Trujillo	BMX racing
Gold medal – first place	2013 Trujillo	BMX time trial
Gold medal – first place	2017 Santa Marta	BMX racing
Gold medal – first place	2017 Santa Marta	BMX time trial
Gold medal – first place	2022 Valledupar	BMX racing
World Junior Championships
Gold medal – first place	2008 Taiyuan	BMX cruiser
Gold medal – first place	2009 Adelaide	BMX cruiser
Gold medal – first place	2009 Adelaide	BMX racing
Women's track cycling
South American Games
Gold medal – first place	2026 Santa Fe	Team sprint
Bolivarian Games
Gold medal – first place	2017 Santa Marta	Team sprint

Mariana Pajón Londoño ODB OLY (born 10 October 1991) is a Colombian cyclist, two-time Olympic gold medalist and BMX World Champion.

She won her first national title at age 5 and her first world title at 9. Overall, she is the winner of 14 world championships, 2 national championships in the United States, 9 Latin American Championships and 10 Pan American championships. She also won the gold medal at the 2012 Summer Olympics in London, on 10 August 2012, as well as in the 2016 Summer Olympics in Rio. She is the first Colombian to win two Olympic gold medals. Pajón's achievements in BMX have earned her the nickname "Queen of BMX".

Named Colombian Athlete of the Year in 2011, a BMX circuit built in Medellin was named for her, and was the venue where she won the 2016 BMX World Championships.

She was selected to be the flag-bearer for Colombia at the 2012 Summer Olympics at the Opening Ceremony.

== BMX Olympic champion ==
=== London 2012 ===
After being the flag-bearer for Colombia during the Opening Ceremony of the 2012 Summer Olympics, Pajón's first participation in the BMX event resulted in the first gold medal for Colombia during the 2012 games and the second overall in Colombia's participation in the Olympics.

After achieving a splendid 1st position in all three runs of the Semifinals, Pajón won with a time of 37.706 seconds during the final.

=== Rio 2016 ===
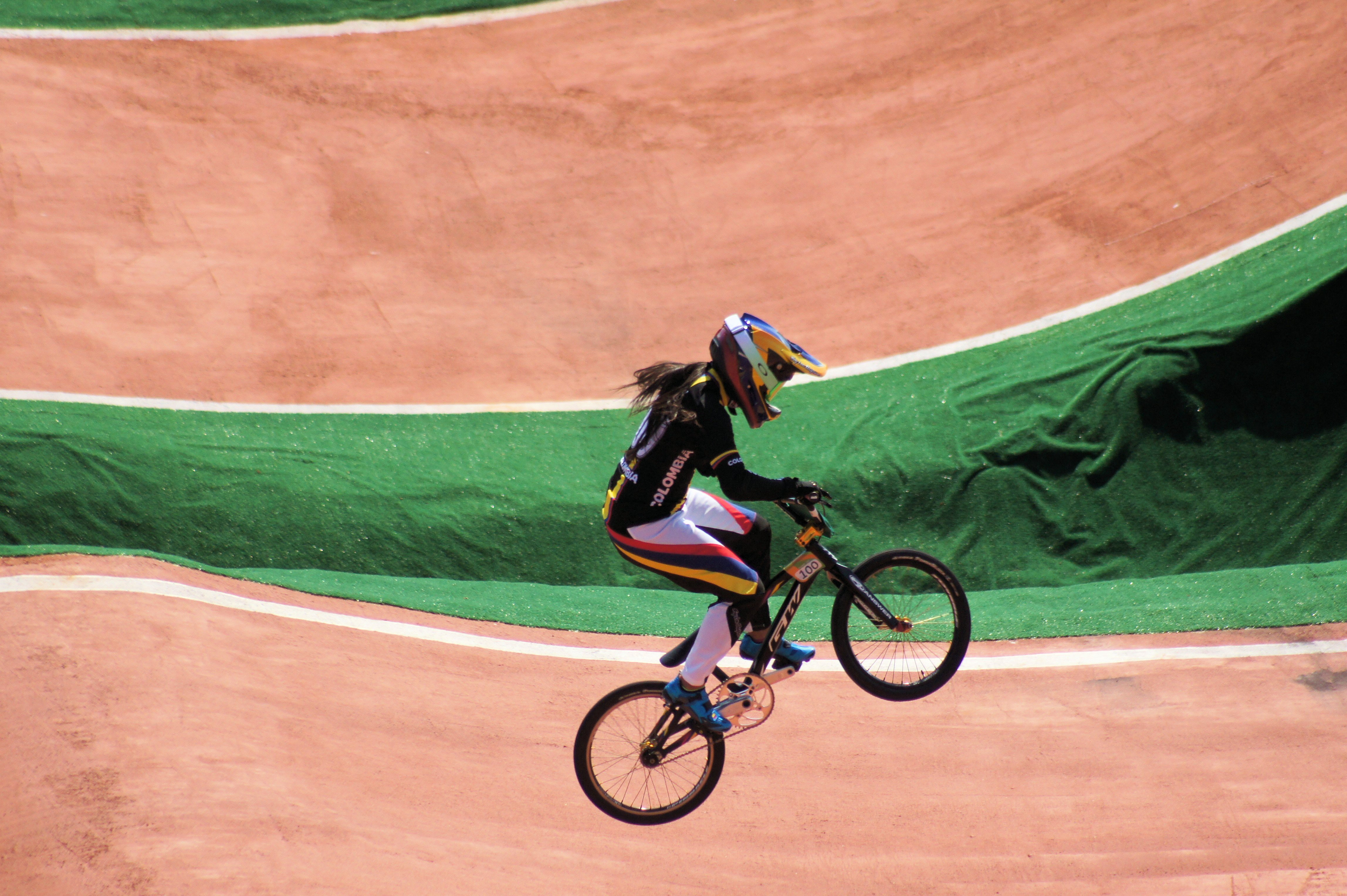
Mariana Pajón won Olympic Gold at the 2016 Summer Olympics

In the 2016 Summer Olympics, Pajón defended her title and won her second Olympic gold medal and fifth overall in Colombia. With this victory, Pajón became the first Colombian athlete to win two gold medals.

=== Tokyo 2020 ===
In the 2020 Summer Olympics Pajón won silver.

== Personal life ==
Mariana Pajón Londoño was born in Medellín, Colombia, on 10 October 1991, the daughter of Carlos Mario Pajón and Claudia Londoño, who were also athletes in their youth (her father practiced motoring and her mother riding). She studied at the Sacred Heart Montemayor Catholic school in Rionegro, near to Medellín.

Mariana learned to ride a bicycle when she was three years old. When she was four she began to perform her first training on the track, and had her first race, in which she competed against children of five and six years-of-age since there was no suitable category.

She was invited to the Youth Camp held during the 2008 Beijing Olympics. On 1 June 2008, Mariana won the UCI BMX World Championship 2008, held in Taiyuan, China, in the Junior Women's Cruiser category.

Pajón married fellow BMX rider Vincent Pelluard on 16 December 2017 after dating for 4 years. Pelluard acquired Colombian citizenship through his marriage with Pajón and now represents Colombia on the international scene.

She was awarded the Colombian Order of Boyacá.

== Awards ==
=== Olympics ===
- London 2012
  - (gold) Olympic gold medal, Women's BMX
- Rio de Janeiro 2016
  - (gold) Olympic gold medal, Women's BMX (First Colombian to achieve 2 gold medals at the Olympic Games)
- Tokyo 2020
  - (silver) Olympic silver medal, Women's BMX

=== Pan American Games ===
- Guadalajara 2011
  - (gold) Pan American Gold Medal, Women's BMX
- Lima 2019
  - (gold) Pan American Gold Medal, Women's BMX
- Santiago 2023
  - (gold) Pan American Gold Medal, Women's BMX

=== World Championships ===
- Taiyuan 2008
  - World Champion, Junior Women Cruiser
- Adelaide 2009
  - World Champion, Junior Women
  - World Champion, Junior Women Cruiser
- Pietermaritzburg 2010
  - World Champion, Elite Women Cruiser
- Copenhagen 2011
  - World Champion, Elite Women
  - Bronze Medal, Elite Women's Time Trial
- Birmingham 2012
  - Fifth position, Elite Women
- Auckland 2013
  - World Champion, Elite Women Time Trial
- Rotterdam 2014
  - World Champion, Elite Women
  - Bronze Medal, Elite Women's Time Trial
- Heusden-Zolder 2015
  - World Champion, Elite Women's Time Trial
- Medellín 2016
  - World Champion, Elite Women
  - Bronze Medal, Elite Women's Time Trial
- Rock Hill 2017
  - Bronze Medal, Elite Women

Olympic Games
Preceded by Cynthia Denzler	Flagbearer for Colombia; London 2012	Succeeded by Yuri Alvear
