= Doménica Azuero =

Ecuadorian cyclist (born 1996)

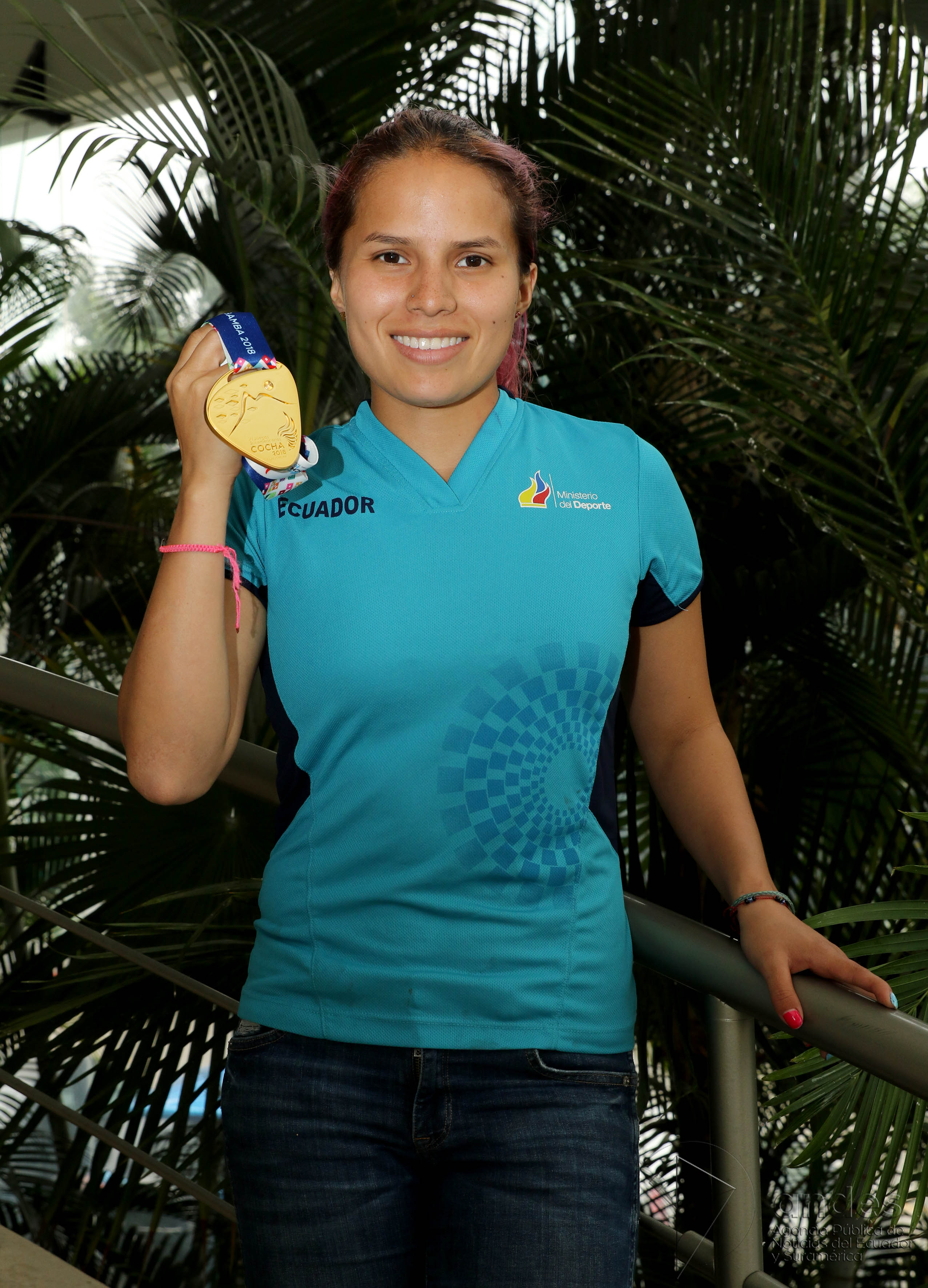

Personal information
- Full name: Doménica Michelle Azuero González
- Born: 22 March 1996 (age 30) Ecuador

Cycling career
- Sport: Cycling
- Discipline: BMX racing
- Role: Rider
Medal record
Representing Ecuador
Women's BMX racing
Event	1st	2nd	3rd
Pan American Games	0	1	0
Pan American Championships	0	2	1
Pan American Junior Championships	2	0	0
Total	2	3	1
Pan American Games
Silver medal – second place	2015 Toronto	BMX racing
Pan American Championships
Silver medal – second place	2018 Medellín	BMX racing
Silver medal – second place	2025 Chillán	BMX racing
Bronze medal – third place	2019 Americana	BMX racing
Pan American Junior Championships
Gold medal – first place	2013 Santiago del Estero	BMX racing
Gold medal – first place	2014 Lima	BMX racing

Doménica Michelle Azuero González (Note: In this Spanish name, the first or paternal surname is Azuero and the second or maternal family name is González.) (born 22 March 1996) is an Ecuadorian BMX rider. She competed in the time trial event at the 2015 UCI BMX World Championships. She also competed in the women's race at the 2020 Summer Olympics.
