= Lauren Reynolds =

Australian cyclist (born 1991)

Personal information
- Nickname: Loza
- Born: 25 June 1991 (age 35) Bunbury, Western Australia
- Height: 170 cm (5 ft 7 in)
- Weight: 70 kg (154 lb)

Cycling career
- Sport: Cycling
- Discipline: BMX — Individual — Women
- Role: Rider

Amateur team
- Bunbury BMX Club
Medal record
Women's BMX racing
Representing Australia
Event	1st	2nd	3rd
World Championships	0	1	0
World Junior Championships	0	1	0
World Cup rounds	0	1	6
Oceanian Championships	1	2	3
Total	1	5	9
World Championships
Silver medal – second place	2013 Auckland	BMX racing
Oceanian Championships
Gold medal – first place	2015 Brisbane	BMX racing
Silver medal – second place	2011 Pukekohe	BMX racing
Silver medal – second place	2014 Shepparton	BMX racing
Bronze medal – third place	2012 Nerang	BMX racing
Bronze medal – third place	2013 Brisbane	BMX racing
Bronze medal – third place	2016 Auckland	BMX racing
World Junior Championships
Silver medal – second place	2008 Taiyuan	BMX racing

Lauren Reynolds (born 25 June 1991) is an Australian cyclist. She represented Australia in the individual BMX event at the 2012 Summer Olympics.

== Personal ==
Nicknamed Loza, Reynolds was born on 25 June 1991 in Bunbury, Western Australia. She attended Leschenault Catholic Primary School before going to Bunbury Catholic College for high school. Beyond cycling, she is also a surfer and basketball player. Lauren quit competitive basketball in 2003. As of 2012, she lives in Perth, Western Australia.

Reynolds is 170 centimetres (67 in) tall and weighs 70 kilograms (150 lb).

== Cycling ==
Reynolds is a BMX cyclist, competing in the individual event. She started riding a BMX bike by the time she was seven years old. As a child, she did BMX riding in Bunbury, doing stunts such as launching herself off the Bunbury jetty and into the river.

Her primary training base is on the Gold Coast of Queensland. She was coached by Tony Hancox from 2006 to 2008. Wade Bootes became her coach in 2009. She is a member of the Bunbury BMX Club. She has a cycling scholarship with the Western Australian Institute of Sport and Queensland Academy of Sport.

Reynolds finished 2nd at the 2011 Australian Championships in Cairns, Australia. She finished 11th at the 2011 BMX World Championships in Copenhagen, Denmark. She finished 3rd at the 2011 BMX Supercross #3 in London, Great Britain.

Reynolds finished 12th at the 2012 BMX World Championships in Birmingham, Great Britain. She finished 15th at the 2012 BMX Supercross #3 in Papendal, The Netherlands. She finished 20th at the 2012 BMX Supercross #2 in Randaberg, Norway. She finished 2nd at the 2012 Australian BMX Championships in Mt Gambier, Australia.

Reynolds was selected to represent Australia in the individual BMX competition at the 2012 Summer Olympics. She was named to the squad on her twenty-first birthday. She was one of five Australian BMX riders selected to represent the country at the 2012 Games. 2012 were her debut Games. There she was left on the eighth place in her semifinal. Her overall standing was fifteenth.

In the 2020 Tokyo Olympics, she made the final, where she came in fifth place.
