= Priscilla Carnaval =

Brazilian cyclist (born 1993)

Personal information
- Full name: Priscilla Andreia Stevaux Carnaval
- Born: 2 December 1993 (age 32) Sorocaba, São Paulo
- Height: 156 cm (5 ft 1 in)
- Weight: 58 kg (128 lb)

Cycling career
- Sport: Cycling
- Discipline: BMX racing
- Role: Rider

Priscilla Andreia Stevaux Carnaval (Sorocaba, 2 December 1993) is a Brazilian female BMX rider, representing her nation at international competitions. She has been part of the Brazilian team since 2010, and the following year she was sixth in the junior category of the 2011 UCI BMX World Championships. Carnaval has since competed in the Elite Women category of the UCI BMX World Championships in 2012, 2015 and 2016, and represented her country in the 2016 Olympics Brazil hosted, and also the 2020 Summer Olympics in Japan.
