= Brooke Crain =

American BMX racing cyclist

Personal information
- Born: April 29, 1993 (age 33) Visalia, California, U.S.
- Height: 5 ft 4 in (163 cm)
- Weight: 126 lb (57 kg)

Sport
- Sport: Cycling
- Event: BMX racing
Medal record
Women's BMX racing
Representing United States
Event	1st	2nd	3rd
World Junior Championships	0	2	1
World Cup	0	1	0
World Cup rounds	1	4	2
Total	1	7	3
World Cup
Silver medal – second place	2016	BMX racing
World Junior Championships
Silver medal – second place	2010 Pietermaritzburg	BMX racing
Silver medal – second place	2011 Copenhague	BMX time trial
Bronze medal – third place	2011 Copenhague	BMX racing

Brooke Crain (born April 29, 1993) is an American BMX racing cyclist. Born in Visalia, California she was selected to represent the United States at the 2012 Summer Olympics in the women's BMX event. On August 8, 2012 during her first run in the seeding event, Crain fell after losing control and was placed 16th and last in the seedings. She competed again at the 2016 Olympics and finished in fourth place.
