= Amanda Carr (BMX rider) =

Thai-American BMX cyclist

Personal information
- Full name: Amanda Mildred Carr
- Nickname: Yong (Thai: หย็อง)
- Born: June 24, 1990 (age 36) Punta Gorda, Florida, U.S.
- Height: 5 ft 6 in (1.68 m)
- Weight: 135 lb (61 kg)

Cycling career
- Sport: Cycling
- Discipline: Bicycle motocross (BMX)
- Role: Rider
Medal record
Women's BMX racing
Representing Thailand
Asian Games
Gold medal – first place	2014 Incehon	Women's BMX

Amanda Mildred Carr (Thai: อะแมนดา มิลเดรด คาร์; born June 24, 1990) is a Thai-American BMX cyclist.

== Early life ==
Carr started BMX when she was 5, after being convinced by her cousins. Carr attended Charlotte High School in Punta Gorda, Florida During high school she earned 17 varsity letters in sports such as golf, track and field, weight lifting and soccer, while maintaining a 3.84 GPA. Carr came in 4th place in the 139lb weight class at the Florida HS AA State Championships in weightlifting with a 150 lb. Bench Press and a 155 lb. Clean & Jerk. Her track and field and soccer skills led to additional opportunities after high school. In 2008, she was a member of the North Carolina State University Women's Soccer team; however she transferred to Florida State University in the spring of 2009. At FSU, taking advantage of her diverse athletic background, Amanda began preparing to compete with the track and field team in the Heptathlon.

== Personal life ==
Carr holds dual US and Thai citizenship. She has an American father and a Thai mother from Udon Thani. Her father is a lawyer and a former US Air Force member. After training under USA Cycling for several years, Carr chose to change her country designation to compete for Thailand in BMX. Carr is a fluent Thai Isan speaker of the North Eastern dialect of Thailand, as her mother taught her the Thai Isan Dialect when she was little, they spoke the Thai North Eastern Dialect.

== Royal decoration ==
- 2015 – Gold Medalist (Sixth Class) of The Most Admirable Order of the Direkgunabhorn
