= UCI BMX World Championships =

World Championships for BMX racing under the UCI

UCI BMX World Championships are the World championship for BMX racing (bicycle motocross) held under the regulations of the Union Cycliste Internationale (UCI), sport's international governing body.

== Summary ==
#	Year	Host	Country	Year	Host	Country
IBMXF / FIAC
IBMXF World Championships				FIAC World Championships		
1	1982	Dayton	United States			
2	1983	Slagharen	Netherlands			
3	1984	Suzuka	Japan			
4	1985	Whistler	Canada	1985	Jesolo	Italy
5	1986	Slough	United Kingdom	1986	Riccione	Italy
6	1987	Orlando	United States	1987	Bordeaux	France
7	1988	Santiago	Chile	1988	Mol	Belgium
8	1989	Brisbane	Australia	1989	São Paulo	Brazil
9	1990	Le Castellet	France	1990	Aranda de Duero	Spain
IBMXF–FIAC World Championships
10	1991	Sandnes	Norway			
11	1992	Salvador	Brazil			
12	1993	Schijndel	Netherlands			
13	1994	Waterford	United States			
14	1995	Bogotá	Colombia			
UCI BMX
1	1996	Brighton	United Kingdom	6		
2	1997	Saskatoon	Canada	6		
3	1998	Melbourne	Australia	6		
4	1999	Vallet	France	6		
5	2000	Córdoba	Argentina	6		
6	2001	Louisville	United States	6		
7	2002	Paulínia	Brazil	6		
8	2003	Perth	Australia	6		
9	2004	Valkenswaard	Netherlands	6		
10	2005	Paris	France	6		
11	2006	São Paulo	Brazil	8		
12	2007	Victoria	Canada	8		
13	2008	Taiyuan	China	8		
14	2009	Adelaide	Australia	8		
15	2010	Pietermaritzburg	South Africa	8		
16	2011	Copenhagen	Denmark	8		
17	2012	Birmingham	United Kingdom	8		
18	2013	Auckland	New Zealand	8		
19	2014	Rotterdam	Netherlands	8		
20	2015	Heusden-Zolder	Belgium	8		
21	2016	Medellín	Colombia	8		
22	2017	Rock Hill	United States	4		
23	2018	Baku	Azerbaijan	4		
24	2019	Heusden-Zolder	Belgium	4		
-	2020	Houston	United States	4		
25	2021	Arnhem	Netherlands	4		
26	2022	Nantes	France	6		
27	2023	Glasgow	United Kingdom	6		
28	2024	Rock Hill	United States	6		
29	2025	Copenhagen	Denmark	6		
30	2026	Brisbane	Australia	6		

- 2020 was cancelled.

== Past winners ==
The following list includes world champions at the elite Championship Level and does not include the Cruiser Level, Challenge level or Juniors, as defined by the UCI BMX Rule Book.

=== Elite Men ===
Event	Gold	Silver	Bronze
1996	Dale Holmes; Great Britain	Randy Stumpfhauser; United States	Florent Boutte; France
1997	John Purse; United States	Greg Romero; United States	Matt Hadan; United States
1998	Thomas Allier; France	Andy Contes; United States	Dylan Clayton; Great Britain
1999	Robert de Wilde; Netherlands	Christophe Lévêque; France	Mario Soto; Colombia
2000	Thomas Allier; France	Christophe Lévêque; France	Dale Holmes; Great Britain
2001	Dale Holmes; Great Britain	Ivo Lakučs; Latvia	Randy Stumpfhauser; United States
2002	Kyle Bennett; United States	Randy Stumpfhauser; United States	Wade Bootes; Australia
2003	Kyle Bennett; United States	Randy Stumpfhauser; United States	Robert de Wilde; Netherlands
2004	Warwick Stevenson; Australia	Cristian Becerine; Argentina	Bubba Harris; United States
2005	Bubba Harris; United States	Mike Day; United States	Robert de Wilde; Netherlands
2006	Javier Colombo; Argentina	Randy Stumpfhauser; United States	Mike Day; United States
2007	Kyle Bennett; United States	Khalen Young; Australia	Randy Stumpfhauser; United States
2008	Māris Štrombergs; Latvia	Steven Cisar; United States	Sifiso Nhlapo; South Africa
2009	Donny Robinson; United States	Mike Day; United States	Ramiro Marino; Argentina
2010	Māris Štrombergs; Latvia	Sifiso Nhlapo; South Africa	Joris Daudet; France
2011	Joris Daudet; France	Māris Štrombergs; Latvia	Marc Willers; New Zealand
2012	Sam Willoughby; Australia	Joris Daudet; France	Moana Moo-Caille; France
2013	Liam Phillips; Great Britain	Marc Willers; New Zealand	Luis Brethauer; Germany
2014	Sam Willoughby; Australia	Tory Nyhaug; Canada	Tre Whyte; Great Britain
2015	Niek Kimmann; Netherlands	Jelle van Gorkom; Netherlands	David Graf; Switzerland
2016	Joris Daudet; France	Niek Kimmann; Netherlands	Nicholas Long; United States
2017	Corben Sharrah; United States	Sylvain André; France	Joris Daudet; France
2018	Sylvain André; France	Joris Daudet; France	Anderson de Souza; Brazil
2019	Twan van Gendt; Netherlands	Niek Kimmann; Netherlands	Sylvain André; France
2020	Cancelled due to Covid-19 pandemic		
2021	Niek Kimmann; Netherlands	Sylvain André; France	David Graf; Switzerland
2022	Simon Marquart; Switzerland	Kye Whyte; Great Britain	Joris Daudet; France
2023	Romain Mahieu; France	Arthur Pilard; France	Joris Daudet; France
2024	Joris Daudet; France	Niek Kimmann; Netherlands	Sylvain André; France
2025	Arthur Pilard; France	Izaac Kennedy; Australia	Eddy Clerté; France
2026	Jesse Asmus; Australia	Ross Cullen; United Kingdom	Mathis Ragot Richard; France

=== Elite Women ===
Event	Gold	Silver	Bronze
1996	Natarsha Williams; Australia	Natasha Massop; Netherlands	Kerstin Munski; Germany
1997	Michelle Cairns; United States	Karien Gubbels; Netherlands	Marie McGilvary; United States
1998	Rachel Marshall; Australia	Marie McGilvary; United States	Brigitte Busschers; Netherlands
1999	Audry Pichol; France	Dagmara Poláková; Slovakia	Tatjana Schocher; Switzerland
2000	Natarsha Williams; Australia	Ellen Bollansée; Belgium	Gabriela Díaz; Argentina
2001	Gabriela Díaz; Argentina	Marie McGilvary; United States	Elodie Ajinça; France
2002	Gabriela Díaz; Argentina	Karine Chambonneau; France	Jana Horáková; Czech Republic
2003	Elodie Ajinça; France	Willy Kanis; Netherlands	Tatjana Schocher; Switzerland
2004	Gabriela Díaz; Argentina	Cyrielle Convert; France	Alice Jung; United States
2005	Willy Kanis; Netherlands	Renee Junga; Australia	Laëtitia Le Corguillé; France
2006	Willy Kanis; Netherlands	Gabriela Díaz; Argentina	Cecile Lazzarotto; France
2007	Shanaze Reade; Great Britain	Sarah Walker; New Zealand	Jana Horáková; Czech Republic
2008	Shanaze Reade; Great Britain	Anne-Caroline Chausson; France	Sarah Walker; New Zealand
2009	Sarah Walker; New Zealand	Eva Ailloud; France	Arielle Martin; United States
2010	Shanaze Reade; Great Britain	Sarah Walker; New Zealand	Alise Post; United States
2011	Mariana Pajón; Colombia	Sarah Walker; New Zealand	Magalie Pottier; France
2012	Magalie Pottier; France	Eva Ailloud; France	Romana Labounková; Czech Republic
2013	Caroline Buchanan; Australia	Lauren Reynolds; Australia	Manon Valentino; France
2014	Mariana Pajón; Colombia	Alise Post; United States	Laura Smulders; Netherlands
2015	Stefany Hernández; Venezuela	Caroline Buchanan; Australia	Simone Christensen; Denmark
2016	Mariana Pajón; Colombia	Caroline Buchanan; Australia	Alise Post; United States
2017	Alise Post; United States	Caroline Buchanan; Australia	Mariana Pajón; Colombia
2018	Laura Smulders; Netherlands	Merel Smulders; Netherlands	Judy Baauw; Netherlands
2019	Alise Willoughby; United States	Laura Smulders; Netherlands	Axelle Étienne; France
2020	Cancelled due to Covid-19		
2021	Beth Shriever; Great Britain	Judy Baauw; Netherlands	Laura Smulders; Netherlands
2022	Felicia Stancil; United States	Zoé Claessens; Switzerland	Merel Smulders; Netherlands
2023	Beth Shriever; Great Britain	Laura Smulders; Netherlands	Alise Willoughby; United States
2024	Alise Willoughby; United States	Zoé Claessens; Switzerland	Daleny Vaughn; United States
2025	Beth Shriever; Great Britain	Saya Sakakibara; Australia	Judy Baauw; Netherlands
2026	Beth Shriever; Great Britain	Saya Sakakibara; Australia	Laura Smulders; Netherlands

== Medals tables ==
These tables includes medalists in all Championship categories, both Men and Women, Junior and Elite, BMX and Cruiser.

=== Medal table ===
1996–2024, all events

Rank	Nation	Gold	Silver	Bronze	Total
1	France	39	37	40	116
2	United States	35	35	36	106
3	Australia	21	19	11	51
4	Netherlands	17	22	18	57
5	Great Britain	14	8	7	29
6	Colombia	14	5	8	27
7	Argentina	6	10	6	22
8	New Zealand	5	6	7	18
9	Latvia	5	3	4	12
10	Ecuador	3	2	0	5
11	Switzerland	2	4	6	12
12	South Africa	2	1	1	4
13	Venezuela	2	0	1	3
14	Canada	1	3	2	6
15	Norway	1	1	1	3
16	Italy	1	1	0	2
17	Brazil	1	0	4	5
18	Portugal	1	0	0	1
19	Czech Republic	0	5	5	10
20	Germany	0	2	4	6
21	Russia	0	2	2	4
22	Belgium	0	1	2	3
23	Chile	0	1	1	2
24	Austria	0	1	0	1
24	Slovakia	0	1	0	1
26	Denmark	0	0	2	2
26	Lithuania	0	0	2	2
Totals (27 entries)		170	170	170	510

== Champions by year ==
Year	Venue	Champions
1996	Brighton, United Kingdom	Elite Women: Natarsha Williams (Australia); Elite Men: Dale Holmes (United Kingdom); Junior Women: Alesha Pollard (United States); Junior Men: Carmine Falco (France); Elite Men Cruiser: Jamie Staff (United Kingdom); Junior Men Cruiser: Scott Beaumont (United Kingdom); Nation: Great Britain
1997	Saskatoon, Canada	Elite Women: Michelle Cairns (United States); Elite Men: John Purse (United States); Junior Women: Rachel Marshall (Australia); Junior Men: Ivo Lakučs (Latvia); Elite Men Cruiser: Christophe Lévêque (France); Junior Men Cruiser: Thierry Fouilleul (France); Nations: France
1998	Melbourne, Australia	Elite Women: Rachel Marshall (Australia); Elite Men: Thomas Allier (France); Junior Women: Heather Bruns (United States); Junior Men: Brandon Meadows (United States); Elite Men Cruiser: Christophe Lévêque (France); Junior Men Cruiser: Warwick Stevenson (Australia); Nation: France
1999	Vallet, France	Elite Women: Audrey Pichol (France); Elite Men: Robert de Wilde (Netherlands); Junior Women: Gabriela Díaz (Argentina); Junior Men: Dan Shanahan (United States); Elite Men Cruiser: Christophe Lévêque (France); Junior Men Cruiser: Chad Hernaez (United States); Nation: France
2000	Córdoba, Argentina	Elite Women: Natarsha Williams (Australia); Elite Men: Thomas Allier (France); Junior Women: Jamie Lilly (United States); Junior Men: Jason Ream (United States); Elite Men Cruiser: Mario Soto (Colombia); Junior Men Cruiser: Medhi Remili (France); Nation: United States
2001	Louisville, United States	Elite Women: Gabriela Díaz (Argentina); Elite Men: Dale Holmes (United Kingdom); Junior Women: Michelle Meandro (United States); Junior Men: Donny Robinson (United States); Elite Men Cruiser: Christophe Lévêque (France); Junior Men Cruiser: Donny Robinson (United States); Nation: Argentina
2002	Paulínia, Brazil	Elite Women: Gabriela Díaz (Argentina); Elite Men: Kyle Bennett (United States); Junior Women: Willy Kanis (Netherlands); Junior Men: Pablo Gutierrez (France); Elite Men Cruiser: Randy Stumpfhauser (United States); Junior Men Cruiser: Santiago Duque (Colombia); Nation: France
2003	Perth, Australia	Elite Women: Elodie Ajinca (France); Elite Men: Kyle Bennett (United States); Junior Women: Samantha Cools (Canada); Junior Men: Artūrs Matisons (Latvia); Elite Men Cruiser: Randy Stumpfhauser (United States); Junior Men Cruiser: Artūrs Matisons (Latvia); Nation: France
2004	Valkenswaard, Netherlands	Elite Women: Gabriela Díaz (Argentina); Elite Men: Warwick Stevenson (Australia); Junior Women: Kimberly Hayashi (United States); Junior Men: Michael Fenwick (Australia); Elite Men Cruiser: Randy Stumpfhauser (United States); Junior Men Cruiser: Augusto Castro (Colombia); Nation: Netherlands
2005	Paris, France	Elite Women: Willy Kanis (Netherlands); Elite Men: Bubba Harris (United States); Junior Women: Nicole Callisto (Australia); Junior Men: Micael César (Portugal); Elite Men Cruiser: Randy Stumpfhauser (United States); Junior Men Cruiser: Sifiso Nhlapo (South Africa); Nation: Netherlands
2006	São Paulo, Brazil	Elite Women: Willy Kanis (Netherlands); Elite Men: Javier Columbo (Argentina); Junior Women: Shanaze Reade (United Kingdom); Junior Men: Moana Moo-Caille (France); Elite Women Cruiser: Laëtitia Le Corguillé (France); Elite Men Cruiser: Donny Robinson (United States); Junior Women Cruiser: Amanda Geving (United States); Junior Men Cruiser: Joe Sowers (United States); Nation: United States
2007	Victoria, Canada	Elite Women: Shanaze Reade (United Kingdom); Elite Men: Kyle Bennett (United States); Junior Women: Magalie Pottier (France); Junior Men: Yvan Lapraz (Switzerland); Elite Women Cruiser: Sarah Walker (New Zealand); Elite Men Cruiser: Jonathan Suárez (Venezuela); Junior Women Cruiser: Magalie Pottier (France); Junior Men Cruiser: Fausto Endara (Ecuador); Nation: United States
2008	Taiyuan, China	Elite Women: Shanaze Reade (United Kingdom); Elite Men: Māris Štrombergs (Latvia); Junior Women: Manon Valentino (France); Junior Men: Sam Willoughby (Australia); Elite Women Cruiser: Magalie Pottier (France); Elite Men Cruiser: Thomas Hamon (France); Junior Women Cruiser: Mariana Pajón (Colombia); Junior Men Cruiser: Joris Daudet (France); Nation: United States
2009	Adelaide, Australia	Elite Women: Sarah Walker (New Zealand); Elite Men: Donnie Robinson (United States); Junior Women: Mariana Pajón (Colombia); Junior Men: Sam Willoughby (Australia); Elite Women Cruiser: Sarah Walker (New Zealand); Elite Men Cruiser: Ivo van der Putten (Netherlands); Junior Women Cruiser: Mariana Pajón (Colombia); Junior Men Cruiser: Joris Daudet (France); Nation: United States
2010	Pietermaritzburg, South Africa	Elite Women: Shanaze Reade (United Kingdom); Elite Men: Māris Štrombergs (Latvia); Junior Women: Merle van Benthem (Netherlands); Junior Men: Sylvain André (France); Elite Women Cruiser: Mariana Pajón (Colombia); Elite Men Cruiser: Renato Rezende (Brazil); Junior Women Cruiser: Teagan O'Keefe (South Africa); Junior Men Cruiser: David Oquendo (Colombia); Nation: United States
2011	Copenhagen, Denmark	Elite Women: Mariana Pajón (Colombia); Elite Men: Joris Daudet (France); Junior Women: Melinda McLeod (Australia); Junior Men: Alfredo Campo (Ecuador); Elite Women Time Trial: Shanaze Reade (United Kingdom); Elite Men Time Trial: Andre Fossa Arguiluz (Norway); Junior Women Time Trial: Melinda McLeod (Australia); Junior Men Time Trial: Darryn Goodwin (Australia); Nation: United States
2012	Birmingham, United Kingdom	Elite Women: Magalie Pottier (France); Elite Men: Sam Willoughby (Australia); Junior Women: Felicia Stancil (United States); Junior Men: Carlos Ramírez (Colombia); Elite Women Time Trial: Caroline Buchanan (Australia); Elite Men Time Trial: Connor Fields (United States); Junior Women Time Trial: Felicia Stancil (United States); Junior Men Time Trial: Romain Mahieu (France); Nation: United States
2013	Auckland, New Zealand	Elite Women: Caroline Buchanan (Australia); Elite Men: Liam Phillips (United Kingdom); Junior Women: Felicia Stancil (United States); Junior Men: Sean Gaian (United States); Elite Women Time Trial: Mariana Pajón (Colombia); Elite Men Time Trial: Connor Fields (United States); Junior Women Time Trial: Felicia Stancil (United States); Junior Men Time Trial: Romain Mahieu (France); Nation: United States
2014	Rotterdam, Netherlands	Elite Women: Mariana Pajón (Colombia); Elite Men: Sam Willoughby (Australia); Junior Women: Doménica Azuero (Ecuador); Junior Men: Niek Kimmann (Netherlands); Elite Women Time Trial: Laura Smulders (Netherlands); Elite Men Time Trial: Sam Willoughby (Australia); Junior Women Time Trial: Sandie Thibaut (France); Junior Men Time Trial: Niek Kimmann (Netherlands)
2015	Zolder, Belgium	Elite Women: Stefany Hernández (Venezuela); Elite Men: Niek Kimmann (Netherlands); Junior Women: Axelle Etienne (France); Junior Men: Exequiel Torres (Argentina); Elite Women Time Trial: Mariana Pajón (Colombia); Elite Men Time Trial: Joris Daudet (France); Junior Women Time Trial: Axelle Etienne (France); Junior Men Time Trial: Shane Rosa (Australia)
2016	Medellín, Colombia	Elite Women: Mariana Pajón (Colombia); Elite Men: Joris Daudet (France); Junior Women: Ruby Huisman (Netherlands); Junior Men: Maynard Peel (New Zealand); Elite Women Time Trial: Caroline Buchanan (Australia); Elite Men Time Trial: Niek Kimmann (Netherlands); Junior Women Time Trial: Merel Smulders (Netherlands); Junior Men Time Trial: Richard Ragot (France)
2017	Rock Hill, United States	Elite Women: Alise Post (United States); Elite Men: Corben Sharrah (United States); Junior Women: Beth Shriever (United Kingdom); Junior Men: Cédric Butti (Switzerland); Masters Men: Tyler Brown (United States)
2018	Baku, Azerbaijan	Elite Women: Laura Smulders (Netherlands); Elite Men: Sylvain André (France); Junior Women: Indy Scheepers (Netherlands); Junior Men: Léo Garoyan (France)
2019	Zolder, Belgium	Elite Women: Alise Willoughby (United States); Elite Men: Twan van Gendt (Netherlands); Junior Women: Jessie Smith (New Zealand); Junior Men: Tatyan Lui-Hin-Tsan (France)
2020	Houston, United States	CANCELLED (COVID-19 Pandemic)
2021	Papendal, Netherlands	Elite Women: Beth Shriever (United Kingdom); Elite Men: Niek Kimmann (Netherlands); Junior Women: Mariane Beltrando (France); Junior Men: Marco Radaelli (Italy)
2022	Nantes, France	Elite Women: Felicia Stancil (United States); Elite Men: Simon Marquart (Switzerland); Junior Women: Léa Brindjonc (France); Junior Men: Julian Bijsterbosch (Netherlands)
2023	Glasgow, United Kingdom	Elite Women: Beth Shriever (United Kingdom); Elite Men: Romain Mahieu (France); U23 Women: Tessa Martinez (France); U23 Men: Filib Steiner (Switzerland); Junior Women: Veronika Stūriška (Latvia); Junior Men: Thomás Maturano (Argentina)
2024	Rock Hill, United States	Elite Women: Alise Willoughby (United States); Elite Men: Joris Daudet (France); U23 Women: Veronika Stūriška (Latvia); U23 Men: Pedro Benalcázar (Ecuador); Junior Women: Teya Rufus (Australia); Junior Men: Joshua Jolly (Australia)
2025	Copenhagen, Denmark	Elite Women: Beth Shriever (United Kingdom); Elite Men: Arthur Pilard (France); U23 Women: Michelle Wissing (Netherlands); U23 Men: Alexis Pieczanowsky (France); Junior Women: Lily Greenough (New Zealand); Junior Men: Evan Oliviera (France)
2026	Brisbane, Australia	Elite Women: Beth Shriever (United Kingdom); Elite Men: Jesse Asmus (Australia); U23 Women: Renske van Santvoort (Netherlands); U23 Men: Joshua Jolly (Australia); Junior Women: Freia Challis (United Kingdom); Junior Men: Lucas Zhou (Canada)

== Individual ==
Most Decorated Riders

Men (Earned 3 or more medals in Elite Men)

Place	Rider		1st place, gold medalist(s)	2nd place, silver medalist(s)	3rd place, bronze medalist(s)	Total
1	Joris Daudet	France	3	2	4	9
2	Randy Stumpfhauser	United States	0	4	2	6
3	Niek Kimmann	Netherlands	2	3	0	5
4	Sylvain Andre	France	1	2	2	5
5	Kyle Bennett	United States	3	0	0	3
6	Maris Strombergs	Latvia	2	1	0	3
7	Dale Holmes	Great Britain	2	0	1	3
8	Robert de Wilde	Netherlands	1	0	2	3
9	Mike Day	United States	0	2	1	3

Women (Earned 3 or more medals in Elite Women)

Place	Rider		1st place, gold medalist(s)	2nd place, silver medalist(s)	3rd place, bronze medalist(s)	Total
1	Alise Willoughby	United States	3	1	3	7
2	Gabriela Díaz	Argentina	3	1	1	5
3	Sarah Walker	New Zealand	1	3	1	5
4	Laura Smulders	Netherlands	1	2	2	5
5	Mariana Pajón	Colombia	3	0	1	4
6	Caroline Buchanan	Australia	1	3	0	4
7	Shanaze Reade	Great Britain	3	0	0	3
8	Willy Kanis	Netherlands	2	1	0	3

=== Most Elite Men's Titles ===
Place	Rider		1st place, gold medalist(s)
1	Kyle Bennett	United States	3
1	Joris Daudet	France	3
3	Dale Holmes	Great Britain	2
3	Thomas Allier	France	2
3	Maris Strombergs	Latvia	2
3	Sam Willoughby	Australia	2
3	Niek Kimmann	Netherlands	2

=== Most Elite Women's Titles ===
Place	Rider		1st place, gold medalist(s)
1	Beth Shriever	Great Britain	4
2	Gabriela Díaz	Argentina	3
2	Shanaze Reade	Great Britain	3
2	Mariana Pajón	Colombia	3
2	Alise Willoughby	United States	3
6	Natarsha Williams	Australia	2
6	Willy Kanis	Netherlands	2

== See also ==
- UCI Track Cycling World Championships – Men's keirin
- UCI Track Cycling World Championships – Women's keirin
- European BMX Championships
