= 2011 UCI BMX World Championships =

BMX tournament

- Venue: Copenhagen, Denmark
- Date(s): July 27–31, 2011
- Stadium: Copenhagen BMX Track
- Events: 8

The 2011 UCI BMX World Championships took place in Copenhagen in Denmark and crowned world champions in the cycling discipline of BMX racing.

== Medal summary ==
Event	Gold	Silver	Bronze
Men's events
Elite Men	Joris Daudet; France	Māris Štrombergs; Latvia	Marc Willers; New Zealand
Junior Men	Alfredo Campo; Ecuador	Trent Woodcock; New Zealand	Antonin Dupire; France
Elite Men Time Trial	André Fosså Aguiluz; Norway	Jelle van Gorkom; Netherlands	Brian Kirkham; Australia
Junior Men Time Trial	Darryn Goodwin; Australia	Trent Woodcock; New Zealand	Thomas Doucet; France
Women's events
Elite Women	Mariana Pajón; Colombia	Sarah Walker; New Zealand	Magalie Pottier; France
Junior Women	Melinda McLeod; Australia	Abbie Taylor; United Kingdom	Brooke Crain; United States
Elite Women Time Trial	Shanaze Reade; United Kingdom	Caroline Buchanan; Australia	Mariana Pajón; Colombia
Junior Women Time Trial	Melinda McLeod; Australia	Brooke Crain; United States	Nadja Pries; Germany

== Medal table ==
* Host nation (Denmark)

Rank	Nation	Gold	Silver	Bronze	Total
1	Australia (AUS)	3	1	1	5
2	Great Britain (GBR)	1	1	0	2
3	France (FRA)	1	0	3	4
4	Colombia (COL)	1	0	1	2
5	Ecuador (ECU)	1	0	0	1
5	Norway (NOR)	1	0	0	1
7	New Zealand (NZL)	0	3	1	4
8	United States (USA)	0	1	1	2
9	Latvia (LAT)	0	1	0	1
9	Netherlands (NED)	0	1	0	1
11	Germany (GER)	0	0	1	1
Totals (11 entries)		8	8	8	24
