= 2007 UCI BMX World Championships =

- Venue: Victoria, British Columbia, Canada
- Date(s): July 26–29, 2007
- Events: 8

The 2007 UCI BMX World Championships took place in Victoria, British Columbia in Canada and crowned world champions in the cycling discipline of BMX racing. Great Britain's Shanaze Reade built upon winning gold at the junior level last year and winning gold at the 2007 UCI Track Cycling World Championships by taking victory in the Elite Women category. In the elite men's event, Kyle Bennett won his third world championship.

== Medal summary ==
| Event | Gold | | Silver | | Bronze | |
|---|---|---|---|---|---|---|
Men's Events
| Elite Men details | Kyle Bennett; United States | 34.956 | Khalen Young; Australia | 35.315 +0.359 | Randy Stumpfhauser; United States | 35.573 +0.617 |
| Junior Men details | Yvan Lapraz; Switzerland | 36.330 | Joey Bradford; United States | 36.395 +0.065 | Logan Collins; United States | 36.701 +0.371 |
| Elite Men Cruiser details | Jonathan Suárez; Venezuela | | Daniel Caluag; United States | | Kelvin Batey; Great Britain | |
| Junior Men Cruiser details | Fausto Endara; Ecuador | | Yvan Lapraz; Switzerland | | George Sowers; United States | |
Women's Events
| Elite Women details | Shanaze Reade; Great Britain | 39.025 | Sarah Walker; New Zealand | 40.027 +1.002 | Jana Horáková; Czech Republic | 40.968 +1.943 |
| Junior Women details | Magalie Pottier; France | 40.586 | Maria Eugenia Ruarte; Argentina | 42.341 +1.755 | Lieke Klaus; Netherlands | 42.694 +2.108 |
| Elite Women Cruiser details | Sarah Walker; New Zealand | | Aneta Hladíková; Czech Republic | | Amelie Despeaux; France | |
| Junior Women Cruiser details | Magalie Pottier; France | | Romana Labounková; Czech Republic | | Joyce Seesing; Netherlands | |

== Medal table ==
* Host nation (Canada)

| Rank | Nation | Gold | Silver | Bronze | Total |
|---|---|---|---|---|---|
| 1 | France (FRA) | 2 | 0 | 1 | 3 |
| 2 | United States (USA) | 1 | 2 | 3 | 6 |
| 3 | New Zealand (NZL) | 1 | 1 | 0 | 2 |
| 3 | Switzerland (SUI) | 1 | 1 | 0 | 2 |
| 5 | Great Britain (GBR) | 1 | 0 | 1 | 2 |
| 6 | Ecuador (ECU) | 1 | 0 | 0 | 1 |
| 6 | Venezuela (VEN) | 1 | 0 | 0 | 1 |
| 8 | Czech Republic (CZE) | 0 | 2 | 1 | 3 |
| 9 | Argentina (ARG) | 0 | 1 | 0 | 1 |
| 9 | Australia (AUS) | 0 | 1 | 0 | 1 |
| 11 | Netherlands (NED) | 0 | 0 | 2 | 2 |
| Totals (11 entries) | | 8 | 8 | 8 | 24 |
