= Hladík =

Hladík (feminine: Hladíkova) is a surname. Notable people with the surname include:

- Aneta Hladíková (born 1984), Czech cyclist
- Ivan Hladík (born 1993), Slovak footballer
- Petr Hladík (cyclist) (born 1948), Czech cyclist
- Radim Hladík (1946–2016), Czech guitarist
- Tereza Hladíková (born 1988), Czech tennis player
- Václav Hladík (1868–1913), Czech writer, journalist and translator
