= Gabriela Díaz =

Argentine BMX cyclist

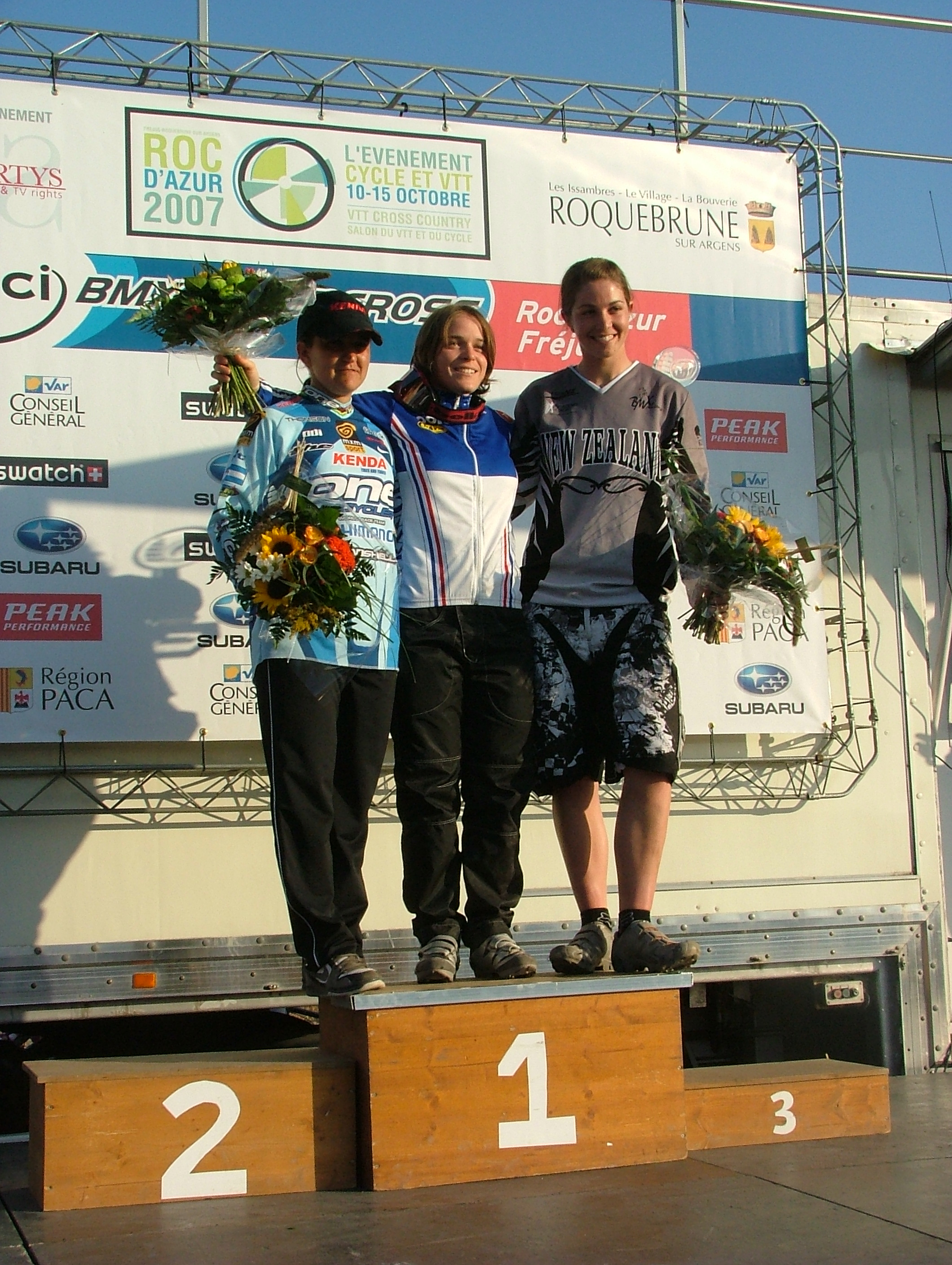
- Diaz (left) at the 2007 Supercross World Cup

Personal information
- Full name: María Gabriela Díaz
- Born: 2 January 1981 (age 45) Alta Gracia, Argentina
- Height: 1.65 m (5 ft 5 in)
- Weight: 65 kg (143 lb)

Cycling career
- Sport: Cycling
- Discipline: BMX racing
- Role: Rider
Medal record
Women's BMX racing
Representing Argentina
Event	1st	2nd	3rd
World Championships	3	1	1
World Junior Championships	1	1	0
World Cup	0	1	0
World Cup rounds	0	2	1
World Junior Cup	1	0	0
Pan American Games	1	0	1
Total	6	5	3
World Championships
Gold medal – first place	2001 Louisville	BMX racing
Gold medal – first place	2002 Paulínia	BMX racing
Gold medal – first place	2004 Valkenswaard	BMX racing
Silver medal – second place	2006 São Paulo	BMX racing
Bronze medal – third place	2000 Córdoba	BMX racing
World Cup
Silver medal – second place	2007	BMX racing
Pan American Games
Gold medal – first place	2007 Rio de Janeiro	BMX racing
Bronze medal – third place	2011 Guadalajara	BMX racing
World Junior Championships
Gold medal – first place	1999 Vallet	BMX racing
Silver medal – second place	1998 Melbourne	BMX racing
World Junior Cup
Gold medal – first place	1999	BMX racing

María Gabriela Díaz (born 2 January 1981 in Alta Gracia, Córdoba) is an Argentine professional BMX cyclist. Emerging as the world's most decorated female BMX rider in history, Diaz has claimed multiple Argentine national titles, six Pan American championship titles, and five medals (three golds, one silver, and one bronze) in women's elite category at the UCI World Championships. She also won two medals, including a prestigious gold, in the same category at the Pan American Games (2007 and 2011), and later represented her nation Argentina at the 2008 Summer Olympics.

Diaz sought sporting headlines at the UCI BMX World Championships, where she claimed a total of five medals (three golds, one silver, and one bronze) in the women's elite category, making her the world's most decorated female rider of all time. At the 2007 Pan American Games in Rio de Janeiro, Brazil, Diaz powered her lead over the eight-strong female squad on the final stretch to take home the first gold for Argentina in the women's BMX category, finishing ahead of host nation's Ana Flávia Sgobin.

Diaz qualified for the Argentine squad in women's BMX cycling at the 2008 Summer Olympics in Beijing by receiving one of the nation's two available berths based on her top-ten performance from the UCI BMX World Rankings. After grabbing a fifth seed on the morning prelims with a time of 37.590 and then mounting a third spot in her semifinal heat with 13 placing points, Diaz narrowly missed out the podium by more than a second with a fifth-place finish in 39.747.

At the 2011 Pan American Games in Guadalajara, Mexico, Diaz could not defend her women's BMX title with a bronze-medal time in 42.971, holding off her sister Mariana on the final turn by a two-second advantage.

Diaz also sought her bid for the 2012 Summer Olympics in London, but she finished sixth in her quarterfinal heat at the 2012 UCI BMX World Championships in Birmingham, England, failing to advance further to the latter rounds for a coveted Olympic spot.
