= Tabitha Rendall =

British cyclist

Tabitha Mary Anne Rendall (29 April 1971 – 18 September 2023) was a British cyclist.

== Early life and education ==
Born in London, Rendall completed BSc in French and Mathematics and an MA in European studies at Sussex University.

== Career ==
Rendall began cycling in her university years, initially with long-distance rides, and later expanded her focus to include BMX and ultra-cycling competitions. Despite starting competitive cycling in her late thirties, she achieved notable successes. These include victories in her class at the Race Across Italy in 2017 and 2018, and her role as a national over-30s BMX champion representing Britain in world championships up until 2019.

Rendall's involvement in cycling transitioned from early equestrian activities to competitive cycling in her later years. Despite taking up competitive cycling in her late thirties, Rendall achieved significant successes, including victories in the Race Across Italy in 2017 and 2018, as well as competing in BMX world championships as a national over-30s champion. Additionally, her contributions to the administrative side of cycling included roles within British Cycling, focusing on the development of BMX and the implementation of safety protocols.
