= Felicia Stancil =

American bicycle racer (born 1995)

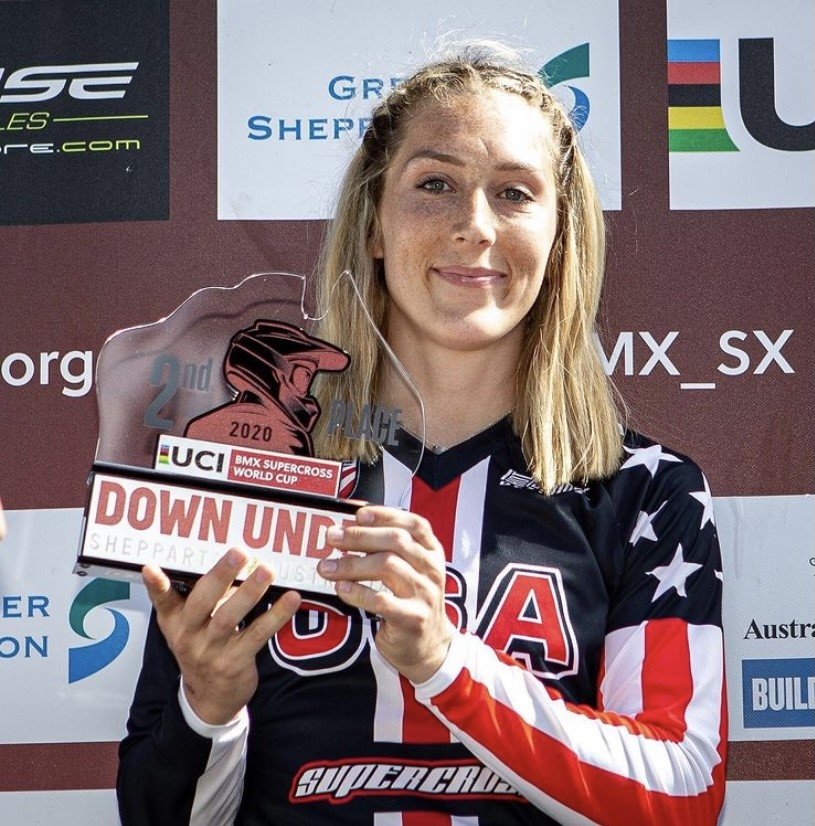
- Stancil in Shepparton, Australia in 2020

Personal information
- Nickname: 'Flyin'
- Born: May 18, 1995 (age 31) Antioch, Illinois, U.S.
- Height: 5 ft 8 in (173 cm)
- Cycling career
- Sport: Cycling
- Current team: United States
- Discipline: BMX racing
- Role: Rider

Professional teams
- 2014–2017: GT
- 2018: Powerlite Dan's Comp
- 2019–2020: Supercross
- 2021: Answer SSquared

Major wins
- 2019 USA Cycling National Champion

Sport

UCI BMX Racing World Cup career
- Starts: 34
- Championships: 0
- Wins: 2
- Podiums: 16
- Best finish: 2nd in 2019
Medal record
Representing United States
Women's BMX racing
Event	1st	2nd	3rd
Olympic Games	0	0	0
World Championships	1	0	0
World Junior Championships	4	0	0
World Cup	0	1	1
World Cup rounds	2	8	6
Pan American Games	1	0	0
Total	8	9	7
World Championships
Gold medal – first place	2022 Nantes	BMX racing
World Cup
Silver medal – second place	2019	BMX racing
Bronze medal – third place	2021	BMX racing
Pan American Games
Gold medal – first place	2015 Toronto	BMX racing
World Junior Championships
Gold medal – first place	2012 Birmingham	BMX racing
Gold medal – first place	2012 Birmingham	BMX time trial
Gold medal – first place	2013 Auckland	BMX racing
Gold medal – first place	2013 Auckland	BMX time trial

Felicia Stancil (born May 18, 1995) is an American female BMX rider. Stancil has won 14 UCI World Titles including the 2012 UCI BMX World Championships titles for Junior Women and the Junior Women Time Trial in Birmingham, United Kingdom. A year later she successfully defended both titles at the 2013 UCI BMX World Championships in New Zealand. At the 2015 Pan American Games, Stancil won gold in her first international win as a professional. The win resulted in the first gold medal won by the United States at the 2015 games. After reaching the final in all ten races on the 2019 UCI BMX Racing World Cup series, Stancil finished out the year 2nd in the overall standings. Adding on to her successful 2019, Stancil was awarded the 2019 Golden Crank Pro of the Year Title by Pull Magazine.

== Racing career ==
Year	Competition	Venue	Position	Event	Notes
Representing the United States
2022	2022 UCI BMX World Championships	Nantes, France	1st	Elite Women	
2021	2021 UCI BMX World Championships	Papendal, Netherlands	7th	Elite Women	
2021	2020 Summer Olympics	Tokyo, Japan	4th	Women's BMX	
2019	2019 UCI BMX World Championships	Zolder, Belgium	6th	Elite Women	
2017	2017 UCI BMX World Championships	Rock Hill, South Carolina	35th	Elite Women	
2016	2016 UCI BMX World Championships	Medellin, Colombia	14th	Elite Women	
2016	2016 UCI BMX World Championships	Medellin, Colombia	11th	Elite Women Time Trial	44.722s
2015	2015 UCI BMX World Championships	Zolder, Belgium	7th	Elite Women	
2015	2015 UCI BMX World Championships	Zolder, Belgium	10th	Elite Women Time Trial	37.533s
2015	2015 Pan American Games	Toronto, Canada	1st	Women's BMX	
2014	2014 UCI BMX World Championships	Rotterdam, Netherlands	15th	Elite Women	
2014	2014 UCI BMX World Championships	Rotterdam, Netherlands	9th	Elite Women Time Trial	28.148s
2013	2013 UCI BMX World Championships	Auckland, New Zealand	1st	Junior Women	
2013	2013 UCI BMX World Championships	Auckland, New Zealand	1st	Junior Women Time Trial	26.133s
2012	2012 UCI BMX World Championships	Birmingham, United Kingdom	1st	Junior Women	
2012	2012 UCI BMX World Championships	Birmingham, United Kingdom	1st	Junior Women Time Trial	29.850s

=== World Championship titles ===
- 2004: 9 Girls
- 2005: 10 Girls
- 2007: 12 Girls
- 2007: 12 & Under Girls Cruiser
- 2009: 14 Girls
- 2009: 13 & 14 Girls Cruiser
- 2010: 15 Girls
- 2010: 15 & 16 Girls Cruiser
- 2011: 16 Girls
- 2011: 15 & 16 Girls Cruiser
- 2012: Junior Women
- 2012: Junior Women Time Trial
- 2013: Junior Women
- 2013: Junior Women Time Trial

=== Collegiate career ===
Felicia attended Marian University in Indiana from 2013 to 2018 where she won the USA Cycling Collegiate BMX National Championship individual title in 2014, 2015 and 2018. Stancil graduated from Marian with a degree in biology and a minor in business in 2018.

== Personal life ==
Stancil grew up in Lake Villa, Illinois where she graduated from Grayslake North High School. Felicia started BMX when she was 4 years old, taking up after her father who was also a professional BMX rider. Besides BMX, Stancil also played volleyball, basketball, floor hockey and track & field growing up. She now resides in Indianapolis, Indiana.
