= Melinda McLeod =

Australian bicycle motocross rider

Personal information
- Born: 12 February 1993 (age 33) Mackay, QLD, Australia

Cycling career
- Sport: Cycling
- Current team: Speedco
- Discipline: BMX Racing
- Role: Rider

Major wins
- 2003 World Champion; 2007 BMX World Champion; 2008 World Champion; 2011 Junior Elite Women World Champion

Melinda McLeod (born 12 February 1993) is an Australian female professional BMX cyclist. Renowned for her jumping ability, she is a six time world champion and has won multiple gold medals at the Australian National Championships. She is currently riding for an American bicycle company called Intense and is a member of the AIS High Performance Program. In 2012, McLeod narrowly missed selection onto the Australian Olympic Team and was later internally named as an alternate athlete. Her dream is to win an Olympic gold medal.

At the 2007 World Championships in Canada, McLeod won two gold medals, making her the most successful Australian rider at the titles.

McLeod was named Junior Sport Star of the Year for her efforts in BMX in 2008. She retired from BMX Racing at the end of 2016.

== Career highlights ==
- Two gold medals at the 2007 BMX World Championships
- Won Gold at the 2008 BMX World Championships in China
- 2011 Junior Elite Women World Champion in Copenhagen, Denmark
- Won multiple Golds at Australian Nationals Championships
