= Sarah Walker (BMX rider) =

New Zealand BMX racer (born 1988)

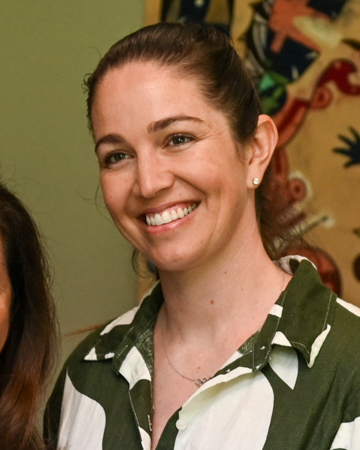
- Walker in 2024

Personal information
- Full name: Sarah Louise Walker
- Nickname: Shazza
- Born: 10 July 1988 (age 38) Whakatāne, New Zealand
- Height: 1.76 m (5 ft 9 in)
- Weight: 74 kg (163 lb)

Cycling career
- Sport: Cycling
- Current team: New Zealand
- Discipline: BMX racing
- Role: Racer
- Rider type: Off road
Medal record
Representing New Zealand
Women's BMX racing
Event	1st	2nd	3rd
Olympic Games	0	1	0
World Championships	3	3	3
World Junior Championships	0	2	1
World Cup	1	0	3
World Cup rounds	4	4	2
Oceania Championships	3	1	0
Total	11	11	9
Olympic Games
Silver medal – second place	2012 London	BMX racing
World Championships
Gold medal – first place	2007 Victoria	BMX cruiser
Gold medal – first place	2009 Adelaide	BMX cruiser
Gold medal – first place	2009 Adelaide	BMX racing
Silver medal – second place	2007 Victoria	BMX racing
Silver medal – second place	2010 Pietermaritzburg	BMX racing
Silver medal – second place	2011 Copenhagen	BMX racing
Bronze medal – third place	2008 Taiyuan	BMX racing
Bronze medal – third place	2008 Taiyuan	BMX cruiser
Bronze medal – third place	2015 Heusden-Zolder	BMX time trial
World Cup
Gold medal – first place	2011	BMX racing
Bronze medal – third place	2007	BMX racing
Bronze medal – third place	2008	BMX racing
Bronze medal – third place	2010	BMX racing
Oceania Championships
Gold medal – first place	2011 Pukekohe	BMX racing
Gold medal – first place	2016 Auckland	BMX racing
Gold medal – first place	2018 Bunbury	BMX racing
Silver medal – second place	2019 Te Awamutu	BMX racing
World Junior Championships
Silver medal – second place	2005 París	BMX racing
Silver medal – second place	2006 São Paulo	BMX cruiser
Bronze medal – third place	2006 São Paulo	BMX racing

Sarah Louise Walker ONZM OLY (born 10 July 1988) is a New Zealand BMX racer. A competitor at the 2008 and 2012 Summer Olympics, she won silver in the Women's BMX at the latter event. Missing out on selection for the 2016 Summer Olympics due to injury, she was elected onto the IOC Athletes' Commission during those Games. In 2022, she was elected as its second vice-chair.

== Early life ==
Walker was born in Whakatāne in the Bay of Plenty, and grew up in nearby Kawerau. Of Māori and European descent, she attended Kawerau South School and Trident High School in Whakatāne.

== BMX career ==
Walker took up BMX due to sibling rivalry; she wanted to be able to do what her younger brother could do, and do it better than him. In the 2008 season UCI Rounds, Walker won seven races, came second in one race and didn't race two races. She was ranked number one in the world by the UCI in 2008, and was one of the favourites to win the BMX women's event at the 2008 Summer Olympics in Beijing, in the end she finished fourth. Walker has won a total of twelve New Zealand 20" titles from 1999 to 2011.

On 25 July 2009, Walker won the BMX World Championship in Adelaide, Australia in both the Elite Women and the Elite Cruiser Women events.

At the 2010 BMX World Championship in Pietermaritzburg, South Africa, Walker finished second in the Elite Women's event, with first place going to Shanaze Reade. A crash during the Elite Cruiser event meant that Walker was not able hold on to her 2009 championship title.

In 2011, Walker made the podium in three out of four World Cup events to win the overall World Cup title, winning the Papendal Supercross in the Netherlands, second at the Test Event in London and third in South Africa. The fourth event was in USA where she finished sixth.

At the 2012 Supercross in Norway, Walker dislocated her shoulder, which almost put her out of contention for the Olympics in London. After six weeks, she had to qualify for the Olympics at the World Championships in Birmingham, England where she did so with a fifth place in the semi-final.

At the September 2014 UCI BMX Racing World Cup race in California, Walker had a fall and suffered a serious head injury. Whilst her helmet cam recorded her calmly giving detailed accounts to medical staff of what happened to her, she has no recollection of the entire day. She had daily headaches for the next six weeks, and it was five months before she received medical clearance. As of February 2016, Walker has experienced a total of 15 fractures during her BMX career.

As well as competing in BMX events around the world, Walker has also been the marketing face for Beef + Lamb New Zealand since 2008. She is a sponsored rider for Avanti Bikes, using their line of ABD BMX bikes when racing.

=== Olympic career ===
Walker wanted to become an Olympic athlete ever since watching New Zealand swimmer Danyon Loader receiving his gold medals at the 1996 Summer Olympics. She was about to start track cycling and quit BMX when it was announced as an Olympic sport for the 2008 Summer Olympics in Beijing, and this was the first Games she attended, competing in the women's BMX. In the medals race, she ran a time of 38.805, finishing fourth. In the same event at the 2012 Summer Olympics she got a silver medal, with a time of 38.644. She missed being nominated for the 2016 Summer Olympics in Rio de Janeiro due to breaking her arm during training in February 2016. During the Rio Games, it was announced that she had been elected onto the IOC Athletes' Commission; whilst initially missing out to Yelena Isinbayeva, president Thomas Bach proposed that Walker be added to the group.

== Sponsorship and advertising work ==
Walker is an ambassador for Beef and Lamb New Zealand, alongside other athlete ambassadors Lisa Carrington, Eliza McCartney and Sophie Pascoe.

== Honours and awards ==
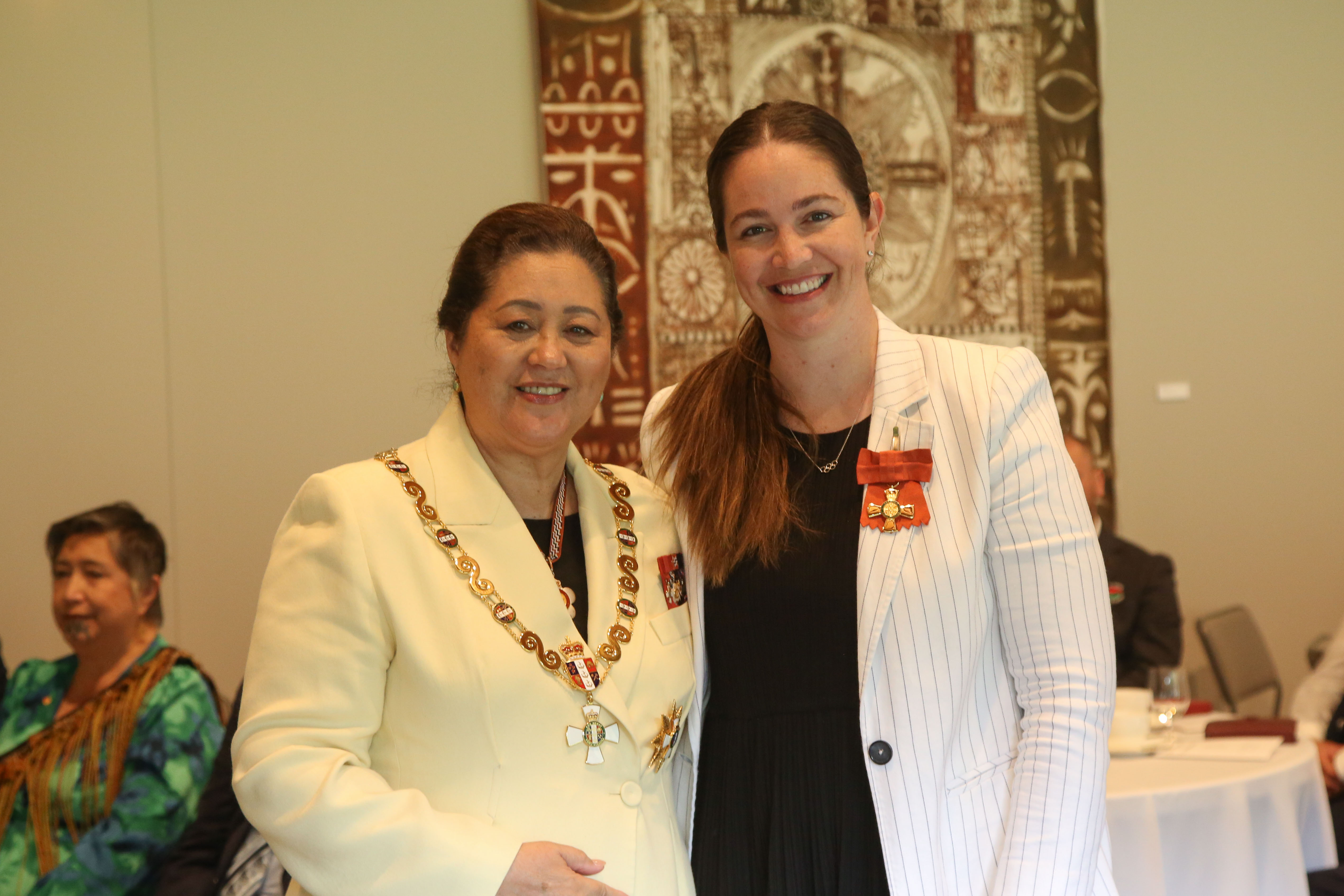
Walker (right), after her investiture as an Officer of the New Zealand Order of Merit by the governor-general, Dame Cindy Kiro, at Government House, Auckland, on 2 October 2025

In the 2025 King's Birthday Honours, Walker was appointed an Officer of the New Zealand Order of Merit, for services to BMX and sports governance.
