= Liam Phillips =

British BMX cyclist

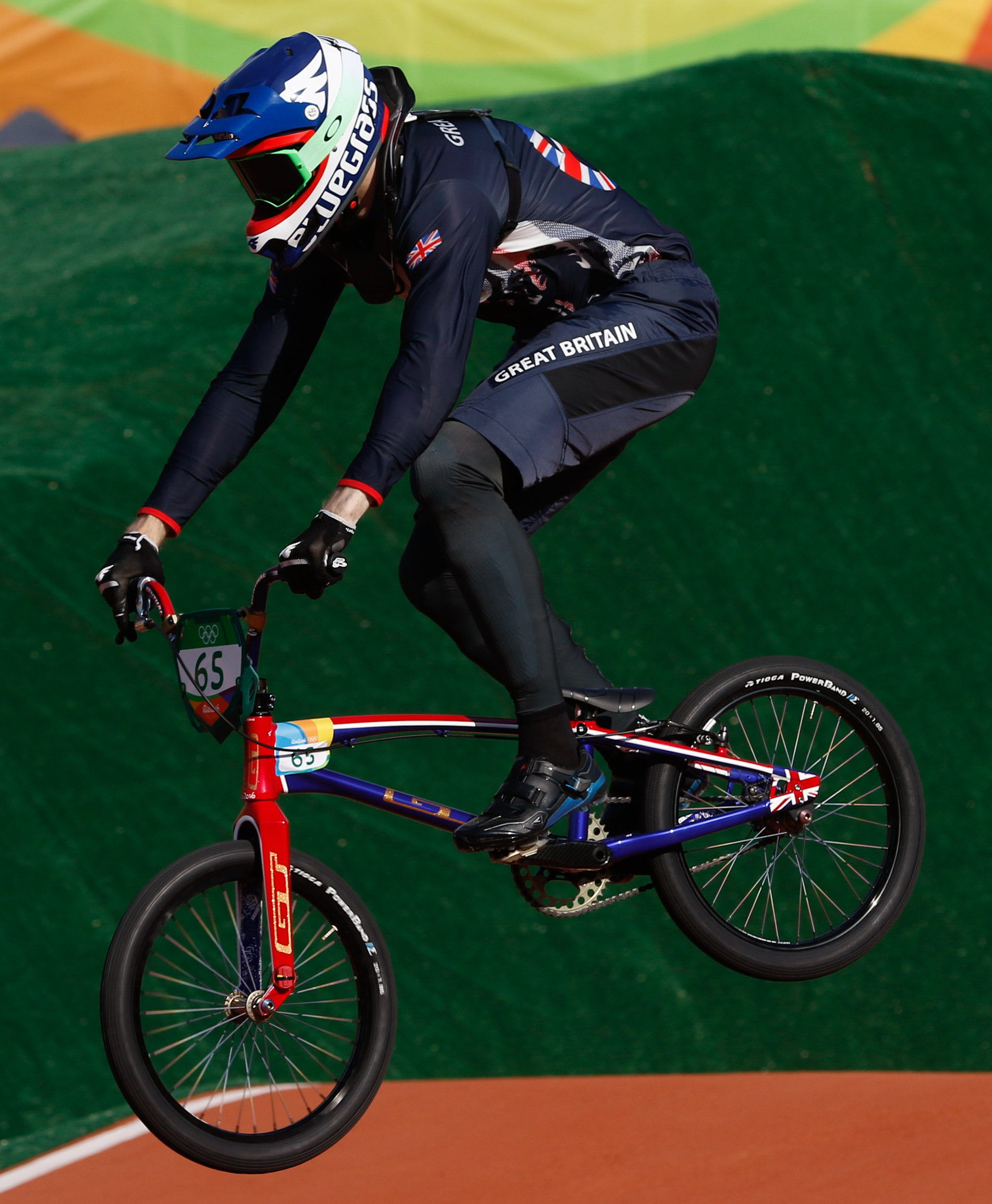
- Phillips at the 2016 Olympics

Personal information
- Full name: Liam Peter Phillips
- Born: 11 March 1989 (age 37) Taunton, England
- Height: 1.81 m (5 ft 11 in)
- Weight: 86 kg (190 lb; 13.5 st)

Cycling career
- Sport: Cycling
- Current team: United Kingdom
- Discipline: Bicycle Motocross (BMX)
- Role: Racer
- Rider type: Off Road

Amateur team
- –: GT, Crupi

Major wins
- UCI BMX World Championships (2013); European Championship (1999)
Medal record
Men's BMX racing
Representing United Kingdom
World Championships
Gold medal – first place	2013 Auckland	BMX racing
Silver medal – second place	2012 Birmingham	BMX time trial
World Cup
Gold medal – first place	2014	BMX racing
Gold medal – first place	2015	BMX racing
Bronze medal – third place	2013	BMX racing

Liam Peter Phillips (born 11 March 1989) is a BMX racing cyclist representing Great Britain. In 2013 he won the UCI BMX World Championships, his first.

Having been cycling from the age of 5, he took up competitive BMX whilst a junior and won ten consecutive British titles. He won his first European title in 1999, and represented Great Britain at the 2008 Summer Olympics, at the 2012 Summer Olympics (despite having broken his collarbone shortly before) and at the 2016 Summer Olympics.

== Early life ==
Born at Musgrove Park Hospital in Taunton, he was raised in Burnham-on-Sea and attended The King Alfred School. He began cycling at the age of five years, and often raced his sister. Both of his parents were involved in BMX with his father being a former national coach, and helped to found the local BMX club in Burnham.

== Cycling career ==
Between the ages of five and fourteen, he was the winner of ten consecutive British BMX titles. In 1999 he won the European BMX Championship for the first time, and joined the Olympic Academy Programme in 2005. In 2008 he was selected for the British team at the 2008 Summer Olympics in Beijing, China as a competitor in the men's BMX. It was the first time the sport had been featured in an Olympic Games as an official sport; Phillips placed seventh in the second heat and was eliminated from the competition.

He was injured at the 2010 UCI BMX World Championships in South Africa, damaging his shoulder during the second moto. In early 2011 he began training with the British track cycling team, eventually being considered as one of the members of the squad's men's sprint team. He decided to make the switch from BMX due to the reduced chance of injury in track racing. During this period he was a member of the sprint team that placed third at the British National Team Sprint Championships in September 2011. However, it was announced in October 2011 that he had decided to return to BMX, which resulted in the media considering him to be one of the best prospects to represent Great Britain in the men's BMX at the 2012 Summer Olympics in London.

Having taken the silver medal in the time trial at the 2012 UCI BMX World Championships held at the National Indoor Arena in Birmingham, the following day Philips broke his collarbone during the morning's Moto 1 race. This resulted in him requiring surgery to insert a metal plate, and put his selection for the 2012 Games in doubt. However, he was chosen for the British team despite the injury and was still aiming for a win at the Olympics, saying "The goal is gold, without a doubt. I'm training not to be a medal winner but to be Olympic champion."

In 2014 Phillips became the first British male rider to win the UCI BMX Racing World Cup, becoming the first rider to win two back-to-back BMX World Cup titles when he took a second series win in 2015.

== Personal life ==
He lives in Manchester, close to the National Indoor BMX Arena. He likes to play golf in his spare time.
