= Aneta Hladíková =

Czech cyclist (born 1984)

Personal information
- Nationality: Czech
- Born: 30 August 1984 (age 41)

Sport
- Sport: Cycling
- Event: BMX racing
Medal record
Women's BMX racing
Representing Czech Republic
World Championships
Silver medal – second place	2007 Victoria	BMX cruiser
European Games
Bronze medal – third place	2015 Baku	BMX racing
European Championships
Bronze medal – third place	2011-2012 Various cities	BMX racing

Aneta Hladíková (Czech pronunciation: [ˈanɛta ˈɦlaɟiːkovaː]; born 30 August 1984) is a Czech racing cyclist who represents the Czech Republic in BMX. She has been selected to represent the Czech Republic at the 2012 Summer Olympics in the women's BMX event. She finished in 10th place. In June 2015, she competed for the Czech Republic at the inaugural European Games in women's BMX. She earned a bronze medal.
