= Cycling at the 2012 Summer Olympics – Women's BMX =

Women's BMX at the Games of the XXX Olympiad
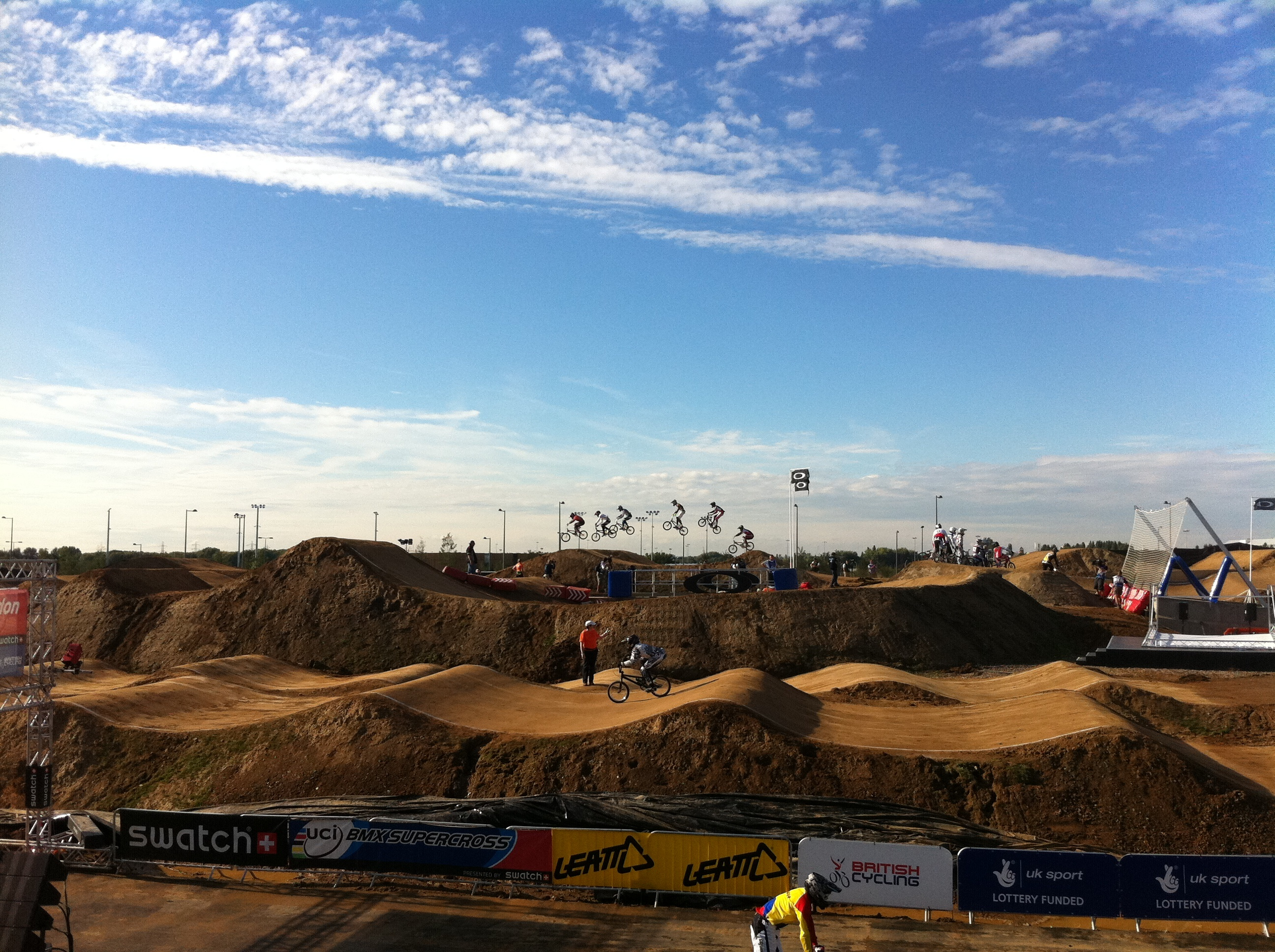
- The BMX track at the Velopark
- Venue: London Velopark
- Date: 8 to 10 August
- Competitors: 16 from 12 nations
- Winning time: 37.706 s

Medalists
1st place, gold medalist(s)		Mariana Pajón	Colombia
2nd place, silver medalist(s)		Sarah Walker	New Zealand
3rd place, bronze medalist(s)		Laura Smulders	Netherlands

The women's BMX racing competition at the 2012 Olympic Games in London took place at the BMX track at the Velopark within the Olympic Park, from 8 to 10 August.

Mariana Pajón from Colombia won the gold medal — the only at the 2012 Games for the country — with a winning time of 37.706 seconds. Sarah Walker from New Zealand won the silver medal and Laura Smulders of the Netherlands took bronze.

== Competition format ==
The riders were seeded into semi-finals based on time trials. The semi-finals consist of three runs, with the top four riders in each group advancing to the final. The final was a one-run contest.

== Schedule ==
All times are British Summer Time (UTC+1)

Date	Time	Round
Wednesday 8 August 2012	15:00	Qualification
Friday 10 August 2012	15:00	Semi-finals and final

== Results ==
=== Seeding run ===
Rank	Name	Country	Time	Notes
1	Caroline Buchanan	Australia	38.434	
2	Sarah Walker	New Zealand	38.644	
3	Mariana Pajón	Colombia	38.787	
4	Laëtitia Le Corguillé	France	38.976	
5	Shanaze Reade	Great Britain	39.368	
6	Laura Smulders	Netherlands	39.420	
7	Magalie Pottier	France	39.778	
8	Alise Post	United States	39.890	
9	Lauren Reynolds	Australia	40.045	
10	Aneta Hladíková	Czech Republic	40.846	
11	Romana Labounková	Czech Republic	41.096	
12	Stefany Hernández	Venezuela	41.253	
13	Sandra Aleksejeva	Latvia	41.752	
14	Vilma Rimšaitė	Lithuania	42.162	
15	Squel Stein	Brazil	42.995	
–	Brooke Crain	United States		DNF

=== Semi-finals ===
==== Semi-final 1 ====
Rank	Name	1st run	2nd run	3rd run	Total	Notes
1	Caroline Buchanan (AUS)	38.276 (1)	40.296 (2)	38.482 (1)	4	Q
2	Shanaze Reade (GBR)	39.029 (2)	38.858 (1)	38.634 (2)	5	Q
3	Brooke Crain (USA)	40.668 (5)	41.029 (4)	40.099 (5)	14	Q
4	Laëtitia Le Corguillé (FRA)	39.902 (4)	1:20.324 (8)	38.759 (3)	15	Q
5	Stefany Hernández (VEN)	1:12.935 (8)	40.513 (3)	39.466 (4)	15	
6	Alise Post (USA)	39.495 (3)	51.752 (7)	DNF (8)	18	
7	Sandra Aleksejeva (LAT)	42.030 (7)	43.159 (6)	42.855 (6)	19	
8	Lauren Reynolds (AUS)	41.103 (6)	41.441 (5)	DNF (8)	19	

==== Semi-final 2 ====
Rank	Name	1st run	2nd run	3rd run	Total	Notes
1	Mariana Pajón (COL)	38.759 (1)	38.749 (1)	38.845 (1)	3	Q
2	Magalie Pottier (FRA)	39.342 (2)	38.828 (2)	39.048 (2)	6	Q
3	Laura Smulders (NED)	39.886 (4)	39.175 (3)	39.660 (4)	11	Q
4	Sarah Walker (NZL)	39.905 (5)	39.348 (4)	39.344 (3)	12	Q
5	Aneta Hladíková (CZE)	39.728 (3)	40.393 (6)	43.752 (7)	16	
6	Romana Labounková (CZE)	40.624 (6)	39.883 (5)	40.777 (6)	17	
7	Vilma Rimšaitė (LTU)	41.789 (7)	40.897 (7)	40.400 (5)	19	
8	Squel Stein (BRA)	DNF (8)	DNS (10)	DNS (10)	28	

=== Final ===
Rank	Name	Time
1st place, gold medalist(s)	Mariana Pajón (COL)	37.706
2nd place, silver medalist(s)	Sarah Walker (NZL)	38.133
3rd place, bronze medalist(s)	Laura Smulders (NED)	38.231
4	Laëtitia Le Corguillé (FRA)	38.476
5	Caroline Buchanan (AUS)	38.903
6	Shanaze Reade (GBR)	39.247
7	Magalie Pottier (FRA)	39.395
8	Brooke Crain (USA)	40.286

== See also ==
- Cycling at the 2012 Summer Olympics – Men's BMX
