= John Purse =

American BMX racer

Personal information
- Full name: John Eric Purse
- Nicknames: "The Vigilante", "The Jackal"
- Born: September 7, 1972 (age 54) Orlando, Florida, United States
- Height: 1.83 m (6 ft 0 in)
- Weight: 83.9 kg (185 lb)

Cycling career
- Sport: Cycling
- Current team: GHP
- Discipline: Bicycle Motocross (BMX)
- Role: Racer
- Rider type: Off Road

Amateur teams
- 1981–1982: U-Truck-It
- 1983: Ben's Bike Shop
- 1984: Blazer
- 1985: Roland Racing
- 1986: S.T.U.D.D
- 1987–1988: Eagle Snacks/Profile
- 1988–1989: MCS Bicycles/Eagle Snacks
- 1989–1990: MCS Bicycles

Professional teams
- 1990: MCS Bicycles
- 1990–1991: S&S Racing
- 1991–1992: ODi/Revcore
- 1992–1993: ODi/GHP
- 1994–1996: Balance
- 1996–2001: Redline Bicycles
- 2001: Profile Racing/Troy Lee Designs/Marzocchi
- 2002: Troy Lee designs/EVS
- 2002–2003: Marzocchi/Troy Lee Designs/Intense Racing
- 2003: Marzocchi/Specialized
- 2003–2005: Hyundai/Mongoose Bicycles
- 2006: Redline Bicycles
- 2006: Sandersclinic.com
- 2006–2007: Redline Bicycles
- 2008: GHP/SandersClinic/PowerBar

John Eric Purse (born September 7, 1972 in Orlando, Florida, raised in Spring, Texas U.S.) is an American former professional "Mid School" Bicycle Motocross (BMX) racer. His prime competitive years were from 1990 to 2000.

Nicknamed "The Vigilante" early in his pro career for his alleged dirty riding and fouling competitors and later and most famously "The Jackal" in the mid-1990s because of his "mad dog" riding style and for his not backing off and his fighting back.

Purse owns several records in BMX racing including the holder of an impressive record of winning the most pro main events in a single season - 25 total AApro wins in the 1998 American Bicycle Association (ABA) season. In 2011 "The Jackal" was enshrined into the National BMX Hall of Fame - Class of 2011

== Racing career milestones ==
Note: All first in Pro Class are on the national level unless otherwise noted.

Started racing: February 8, 1981 at eight years old at Armadillo Downs in Conroe, Texas.

Sanctioning body: American Bicycle Association (ABA)

First race result: Second place.

First win (local):

Home sanctioning body district(s): ABA Texas 3 (Tex-3) (1985);
United States Bicycle Motocross Association (USBA) Texas District 4 (TX-4) (1986)

First sponsor: U-Truck-It 1981.

First national win:

Turned Professional: January 1990 at age 17. He forged his mother's signature on the Pro License applications to the ABA and NBL. His mother got wind of it a couple of months later (Purse had been doing quite well as a pro in the interim, including winning his first pro race. See "First Professional race result" below) and complained to both sanctions. She ordered that John to be suspended and prevented from racing pro since he did so without her permission. He found out when he went to sign up to race the NBL Memphis Indoor Classic in Memphis, Tennessee in March 1990. He had to sit out both days of racing. He got his pro papers in order in time to race the ABA Supernationals in El Paso, Texas. He won this last "A" pro race on Sunday (Day 2) April 1, 1990 and was moved up to "AA" pro.

First Professional race result: First place in "A" pro at the ABA Lone Star Nationals San Antonio, Texas on January 27, 1990. He won US$525, the equivalent of US$826.26 in 2007 (Cost of Living Calculator)

First Professional win: See above.

First Junior Pro* race result: See above.

First Junior Pro win: See above.

First Senior Pro** race result: Seventh place in "AA" pro at the ABA Mid-America Nationals in Blue Springs, Missouri on May 12, 1990 (Day 1).

First Senior Pro win:

Retired: He retired from active in Senior Pro competition in 2007. He currently races in Veteran Pro class.

Height & weight at height of his career (1990–2000): Ht:6'0" Wt:~185 lbs.

*In the NBL it is B"/Superclass/"A" pro (beginning with 2000 season)/"AA" Pro/Elite Men; in the ABA it is "A" pro (depending on the era).
**In the NBL it was/is "B" pro/Superclass/"A" Pro/Junior Elite Men; in the ABA it is "AA" pro.

=== Career factory and major bike shop sponsors ===
Note: This listing only denotes the racer's primary sponsors. At any given time a racer could have numerous ever-changing co-sponsors. Primary sponsorships can be verified by BMX Press coverage and sponsor advertisements at the time in question. When possible exact dates are given.

==== Amateur ====
- U-Truck-It: 1981–1982
- Ben's Bike Shop: 1983
- Blazer: 1984
- Roland Racing: 1985
- S.T.U.D.D: 1986
- Eagle Snacks/Profile: Early March 1987 – September 1988. At this time Eagle Snacks was still a separate racing team and had not merged with MCS.
- Eagle Snacks/MCS (Moto Cross Specialties) Bicycles: September 1988 – November 1989. Eagle Snacks formed a joint team sponsorship with MCS Bicycles in August 1988 to defer some of the cost of fielding a BMX racing (or in other cases freestyle) team. This was the modern start of trend of two separate companies jointly sponsoring a team that became standard practice by the year 2000.
- MCS Bicycles: November 1989 – July 1990 John turned pro with this sponsor.

==== Professional ====
- MCS Bicycles: November 1989 – July 1990 By November 1989 Eagle Snacks had largely dropped its BMX effort. MCS did merge part of its team with Vans team having Terry Tenette, Pete Loncarevich and Danny Millwee on that team, but MCS also had a team that was separate from the Vans/MCS effort. In July 1990 MCS dropped its BMX team except Terry Tenette causing Purse to pursue another sponsor.
- S&S Racing (Bicycle Shop): Late 1990 – August 1991
- ODi (Ornate Design, Inc.) /Revcore: September 1991 – November 1992
- ODi/GHP (Greg Hill Products) Late November 1992-through September 1993‡)
- Balance: 1994 – May 1996
- Redline Bicycles: May 1996 – March 30, 2001. After missing much of the 2000 and early 2001 racing seasons due to injuries Redline decided to exercise its clause in the contract with Mr. Purse that stated that they had the right to let him go if he missed so many races unless he agreed to accept a new contract not as advantageous to Purse and gave him until March 30, 2001 to accept. Purse didn't and moved on to Profile Racing.
- Profile Racing/Troy Lee Designs/Marzocchi Steering Systems: April 1, 2001 – December 2001
- Troy Lee designs/EVS: January 2002 – October 2002
- Marzocchi/Troy Lee Designs/Intense Racing: October 2002 – January 2003
- Marzocchi/Specialized: Mid January 2003 – February 5, 2003
- Hyundai/Mongoose Bicycles: February 5, 2003 – December 2005
- Redline Bicycles: April 4, 2006 – June 2006. This was a short two-month sponsorship that was intended as a fill in for Redline's regular sponsored pro the injured Bubba Harris, who was laid up with a shoulder injury that was slated to take him out of racing for two months.
- Sandersclinic.com: June 28, 2006 – late September 2006
- Redline Bicycles: Late September 2006 – 2007. This is John Purse's third stint on Redline.
- GHP/www.SandersClinic.net/PowerBar: January 2008–present

‡The latest known date he was known to be sponsored by that company

=== Career bicycle motocross titles ===
Note: Listed are District, State/Provincial/Department, Regional, National, and International titles in italics. "Defunct" refers to the fact of that sanctioning body in question no longer existing at the start of the racer's career or at that stage of his/her career. Depending on point totals of individual racers, winners of Grand Nationals do not necessarily win National titles. Series and one off Championships are also listed in block.

==== Amateur ====
National Bicycle Association (NBA)

- None

National Bicycle League (NBL)

- 1985 12 Expert Grandnational Champion
- 1987 15 Expert President's Cup Champion.*

*The President's Cup was an amateur only non points invitational race held in conjunction with the Christmas Classic National during the last week of December after Christmas and before New Year's, usually on a Tuesday or Wednesday.

American Bicycle Association (ABA)

- 1985 12 Expert Winter Season Texas 3 (TX-3) District Age Group (DAG) No.1*

*DAG District Age Group, NAG-National Age Group
In 1985 the ABA experimented with dividing the district points season from one year lasting from January 1 to December 31 to three four-month-long time periods at which a racer could earn a plate number for that time period for their district overall and/or their age group and could race the rest of the year with it. The experiment lasted only for a year before the ABA reverted to a single year-long points gathering season in 1986.

United States Bicycle Motocross Association (USBA)

- 1985 Texas District 4 (TX-4) 20" and Cruiser Group No.1
- 1986 TX-4 Cruiser Group No.1

International Bicycle Motocross Federation (IBMXF)*

- 1987 14 boys Silver Medal (2nd) World Champion
- 1988 15 boys World Champion
- 1989 16 boys World Champion

Fédération Internationale Amateur de Cyclisme (FIAC)*

Union Cycliste Internationale (UCI)*

- None

*See note in Professional section.

==== Professional ====
National Bicycle League (NBL)

- 1995 Mid Year Series Champion
- 1996 Pro Class and Pro/Super Award Grandnational Champion
- 1995, 1996 National No.1 Pro.
- 2003 Elite Men National No.2
- 2009 Elite Nasters Grand National Champion

American Bicycle Association (ABA)

- 1992 "AA" Pro and Pro Open Race of Champions Champion (Double)
- 1997 National No.1 Pro.
- 1997 ABA Pro World Champion.
- 2003 "AA" Pro National No.2
- 2008 Veteran Pro Race of Champions Champion

International Bicycle Motocross Federation (IBMXF)*

- None

Fédération Internationale Amateur de Cyclisme (FIAC)*

- None (defunct)

*None (FIAC did not have a strictly professional division during its existence).
Union Cycliste Internationale (UCI)*

- 1997 UCI Elite Men World Champion

USA Cycling:

- 2009 Masters Class First Place National Champion

*Note: Beginning in 1991 the IBMXF and FIAC had been holding joint World Championship events as a transitional phase in merging which began in earnest in 1993. Beginning with the 1996 season the IBMXF and FIAC completed the merger and both ceased to exist as independent entities being integrated into the UCI. Beginning with the 1996 World Championships held in Brighton, England the UCI would officially hold and sanction BMX World Championships and with it inherited all precedents, records, streaks, etc. from both the IBMXF and FIAC.

Independent Pro Series Championships and Invitationals

=== Notable accolades ===
- He is a consecutive three-time winner of ABA's BMXer magazine Golden Crank Award for Pro of the Year in 1997, 1998, and 1999.
- In 1998 he set the single season record of most wins at 25.
- He is a 1998 BMX Plus! Racer of the Year Award winner.
- He is a 1999 BMX Plus! Racer of the Year Award winner.
- He is a 1999 winner of Snap Magazine's Number One Rider Award (NORA) Cup*.
- In 2005 he set the most mains appearances record at 308 becoming during that time the first to break the 300 mains barrier. As of May 2006 his mains appearance is up to 310.
- His Senior Pro career is a contiguous 17 years, the longest BMX pro career in its history.

*The NORA Cup was an award first created by Bicycle Motocross Action magazine in 1978, with Bobby Encinas being the first recipient, until its demise as Go magazine in 1992. Gary Ellis was the last winner in 1991. Snap BMX Magazine revived the award in 1998, with Gary Ellis being its first winner and rewarded it to Racers, Dirt Jumpers and Freestylers until its demise as Transworld BMX with the January 2005 issue. The NORA Cup is now owned by Ride BMX Magazine.

=== BMX product lines ===
- 1999 Redline John Purse signature series frame.

Product Evaluation:

Snap BMX Magazine August 2000 Vol.7 Iss.8 No.46 pg.87
Snap BMX Magazine December 2000 Vol.7 Iss.12 No.50 pg.116 (2001 Model Year)

- 2005 Mongoose John Purse signature series bicycles

Product Evaluation:

- 2009 Greg Hill Products (GHP) "Jackal Pro XL" signature model

Product Evaluation:

=== Significant injuries ===
- Had seven broken clavicles over his career, including on May 9, 1999 at the ABA Dixieland Nationals in Marietta, Georgia. He was laid up until the UCI World Championships in Vallet, France in July 1999.
- He separated his shoulder in a crash at the 1999 ABA Grandnationals in Tulsa, Oklahoma.
- He reinjured his collar bone on March 19, 2000 at the Mercury Sea Otter Classic in Monterey, California.
- Broke thumb at the January 2001 ABA Silver Dollar National in Reno, Nevada.
- Jammed the fingers of his right hand in a crash at the NBL Speedway Nationals, in East Moline, Illinois on June 15, 2002 (Day 1). He sat out Day 2.

=== Racing habits and traits ===
- He developed a reputation of having an erratic riding style that made him unpredictable and therefore hard to pass when he was in the lead. This was also partly responsible for him being labeled by his competitor a "dirty rider". Ironically, even earlier in his career before he "earned" the "vigilante" moniker, he had a reputation as being a quiet pro:
  "....JOHN PURSE would no doubt win an award for quietest pro in the biz. Because he's so mellow, maybe no one considers him to be a big threat. Or maybe since he draws no attention to himself, he can sneak in for wins and top finishes. For whatever reason, Johnny has been jammin' all year. Pro Open was his target this weekend taking second to Veltman on Saturday and then winning it Sunday. And I don't think anyone noticed him. ----American BMXer August 1990 referring to the July 1, 1990 American Bicycle Association (ABA) Summernationals.

However, that placid reputation would change very quickly:

Dale Holmes: Over the years you have had some run ins with other riders, who would say were some of your best disagreements with?

John Purse: The one that comes to mind first is Charles Townsend. He gave me my 2nd and 6th broken collarbone from BMX racing. I had an after the race moment with Charles in San Antonio in the early 1990s and yelled at most of the AA's that were there, I threw my bike at Greg Hill at the Fall Nationals in 1990, a last turn fight with Eric Carter at the 1990 ABA Grands, a conversation with Gary Ellis at the 1995 ABA World Cup after he ran me off the track, and many others along the way. Actually Dale, me and you went round and round when I broke my thumb at ABA Reno in 2001. ----DaleHolmes.com 2002 interview

Purse does indicate that he was the cause of most of the problems in this quote:

When I first turned, (pro) I would just defend myself against others and ride aggressively in return, but I learned that you'll just get disqualified, you'll look bad, and it's just going to cause problems. So I just played their game. If they messed with me on the track, I let it go and just get them next time. So I learned just to chill out.----Ride BMX December 1993

=== Miscellaneous ===
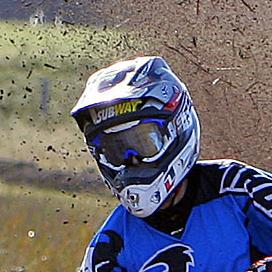
Figure 1: It was a helmet similar to this, common in motorcycle motocross (MX) and downhill mountain biking (DH/MTB), that Purse helped introduce to BMX racing in the mid-1990s

- He was named number two on the list of the five "Dirtiest Riders in BMX" for 1992 in the June 1992 issue of BMX Plus!
- Along with Alan Foster and Brian Lopes John Purse is credited with bringing back the full face helmet back into BMX in the Summer of 1996. The Full Face Helmet (Figure 1) has a rigid chin bar structure to protect the lower front half of the head. It had fallen out of fashion since the mid-1980s for BMX racing due in part with claims that it hindered the racer's vision. The fact that it also obscured the racer's face in magazine photos also may have had a role in its decline in popularity. By the mid-1980s the three quarter or "open faced" helmet were standard (Figure 2). For lower face protection a racer used a combination chin and mouthguard that strapped onto the bottom of the helmet called generically a "Joffa". During this ten-year interim the only serious BMX riders who regularly used full faced helmets where ramp style freestyle riders and later dirt jumpers. Both of whom perform complicated trick maneuvers from significantly high altitudes off the ground, as much as 30 to 40 feet at times. Ironically, as full face helmets gained in popularity among racers, it declined among dirt jumpers (although ramp freestylers still used them). Dirt Jumpers and even some freestylers stopped wearing BMX helmets of any kind and started using skateboarding helmets that only protected the crown of the head; again for visibility reasons when doing stunts.

While not mandatory in either the ABA or the NBL, The full face helmet is the worn today by the large majority of BMX racers; pro and amateur alike.

- John Purse like countless BMX racers before him has tried his hand at Mountain Bike racing, the first being the 2001 NORBA Downhill event the Bump & Grind at Oak Mountain in Birmingham, Alabama. He came in fifth place overall with a 4-minute, 35 seconds first run and a 4 minutes, 33 seconds second run.
- John Purse is the step father of BMX pro racer Kyle Bennett. This makes them technically the only father-son combination to win racing titles in BMX, professional or amateur. They both held the NBL National No.1 pro title. Bennett won in 2002, 2004 and 2007; Purse won in 1995 and 1996. They also both won UCI Elite Men World Championships; Purse in 1997 and Bennett in 2002, 2004 and 2007. When Purse was an up-and-coming pro and Bennett was an amateur at the beginning of his career, they were on the same team; S&S racing in 1991. It was a bicycle shop team.

== BMX press magazine interviews and articles ==
- "John Purse" Ride BMX December 1993 Vol.2 Iss.6, No.8 pg.30 Note: Ride BMX magazine at this time did not number its pages.
- "John Purse: Model Citizen" Snap BMX Magazine November/December 1995 Vol.2 Iss.6 No.7 pg.32
- "Texas Road Trip" Snap BMX Magazine May/June 1996 Vol.3 Iss.3 No.10 pg.41 One of four separate mini interviews of two fellow pro racers Jason Carnes Wade Bootes and "Poor Boy" company owner Steve Inge residing in the American state of Texas.
- "How to Win BMX Races" BMX Plus! January 1997 Vol.20 No.1 pg.60 John Purse describes the mental attitude to have to be successfully at racing. In the same issue on page 56 "The Champion Speaks: A Quick Interview with the #1 Pro" A mini interview on Purse's reaction to becoming the 1996 NBL National No.1 Pro.
- "From One Track to Another" Transworld BMX May 2003 Vol.10 Iss.5 No.79 pg.32 An article written by pro BMX racer Jason Richardson the described the tryouts on a Velodrome track at USA Cycling's United States Olympic Training Center (USOTC) from January 8 to 14 2003 with Steven Alfred (track racer), Jason Carnes, Kenth Fallen, Rob Lindstrom (track racer), Darrin Mitchell, John Purse, Craig Reynolds, Richardson himself, Greg Romero, Randy Stumpfhauser and Terry Tenette. Following the lead of Jamie Staff making the British Track Cycling team some of his fellow BMX racers explored the possibility of trying out the track racing discipline with the idea of going to the Olympics. This was done Just before the announcement on June 30, 2003 by the International Olympic Committee (IOC) of their making BMX Racing an Olympic sport beginning in 2008.
- "Pop Quiz: John Purse" Moto Mag November/December 2003 Vol.2 No.6 pg.23 An interview in the form of a mock school quiz.

== BMX magazine covers ==
Note: Only magazines that were in publication at the time of the racer's career(s) are listed unless specifically noted.

Minicycle/BMX Action & Super BMX:

- None

Bicycle Motocross Action & Go:

- None

BMX Plus!:

- January 1990 Vol.13 No.1
- July 1993 Vol.16 No.7 in top insert ahead of Charles Townsend. In bottom left insert Todd Corbitt. In lower right insert freestyle frames and forks.
- July 1998 Vol.21 No.7 in middle right insert studio shot. In top insert Greg Romero and Neal Wood in a physical confrontation with two ABA track officials intervening. Bottom insert freestyler Ruben Castillo. Main image Ultimate dream bike 1998.
- June 2009 Vol.32 No.6 Main image.

Total BMX:

- None

Bicycles and Dirt:

- None

BMX World (1990 version)

Snap BMX Magazine & Transworld BMX:

- Snap March/April 1996 Vol.3 Iss.2 No.9 (8) in second place behind Christophe Lévêque (15) and ahead of Neal Wood (23) in third.
- Snap July 2000 Vol.7 Iss.7 No.45

Twenty BMX:

Moto Mag:

- None

BMX World (2005 version)

NBA World & NBmxA World (The official NBA/NBmxA membership publication):

Bicycles Today & BMX Today (The official NBL membership publication under two names):

ABA Action, American BMXer, BMXer (The official ABA membership publication under three names):

USBA Racer (The official USBA membership publication):
