= Warwick Stevenson =

Australian BMX racer

Personal information
- Full name: Warwick Brian Stevenson Jr.
- Nickname: "Warlock"
- Born: 13 May 1980 (age 46) Sydney
- Height: 1.85 m (6 ft 1 in)
- Weight: ~95.3 kg (210 lb)

Cycling career
- Sport: Cycling
- Current team: Formula/Fly Racing
- Discipline: Bicycle Motocross (BMX)
- Role: Racer
- Rider type: Off Road

Amateur team
- 1990–1999: ?

Professional teams
- 1999: American Bicycle Association (ABA)
- 1999: Standard Bykes
- 1999–2002: Diamondback Bikes
- 2002–2004: Haro/Lee Pipes
- 2004: Maxxis
- 2004–2006: Haro/Adidas
- 2006: Redman/Yamaha Waverunner
- 2006–2007: Kuwhahara Cycles, Ltd.
- 2008–present: Formula/Fly Racing

Warwick Brian Stevenson Jr. (born 13 May 1980 in Sydney, Australia) is an Australian professional "Mid/Current School" Bicycle Motocross (BMX) racer whose prime competitive years are from 1995 to current. Nicknamed the "Warlock" as a play on his given name Warwick.

== Racing career milestones ==
Note: Professional first are on the national level unless otherwise indicated.

Started racing: 1990 at age 10 in Australia. He used to race motorcycle motocross (MX) until it got too dangerous and expensive.

Sanctioning body:

First race result:

First win (local):

First sponsor:

First national win:

Turned Professional: 1999 in Australia at the age of 19.

First Professional race result:

First Professional win:

First Junior Pro* race result:

First Junior Pro win:

First Senior Pro** race result:

First Senior Pro win:

Retired:

Height & weight at height of his career Ht:6'1" Wt:~210 lbs.

*In the NBL "B" Pro/Super Class/"A" Pro/Junior Elite Men depending on the era; in the ABA it is "A" Pro.
**In the NBL it is "AA" Pro/Elite Men; in the ABA it is "AA" Pro.

=== Career factory and major bike shop sponsors ===
Note: This listing only denotes the racer's primary sponsors. At any given time a racer could have numerous ever changing co-sponsors. Primary sponsorships can be verified by BMX press coverage and sponsor's advertisements at the time in question. When possible exact dates are given.

==== Amateur ====
Note: At this time Stevenson's Australian amateur record is not available.

==== Professional ====
- American Bicycle Association (ABA): Early April 1999 – 24 April 1999. This wasn't a formal sponsorship but the ABA did provide room and board and transportation to races in the first few weeks after Stevenson arrived in America:

When I moved here I didn't have any money. None. Zero. I needed a way to get to the races as cheaply as possible. I got a great opportunity from the ABA to help set up the races, sleeping on the floor in their hotel, and riding in their truck to all the nationals. ---Transworld BMX October 2004

- Standard Bykes: 25 April 1999 – 31 July 1999. Stevenson got his first formal sponsorship in the U.S. three weeks after arriving. After leaving Standard he raced as an independent for approximately six weeks.
- Diamondback Bikes: Mid September 1999-December 2002
- Haro/Lee Pipes: December 2002 – 2004
- Maxxis: 2004
- Haro/Adidas: November 2004-Mid March 2006
- Redman/Yamaha Waverunner: Mid March 2006 – July 2006
- Kuwhahara Cycles, Ltd. : July 2006 – 29 December 2007
- Formula Bicycle Company/Fly Racing: 2 January 2008-Present.

=== Career bicycle motocross titles ===
Note: Listed are District, State/Provincial/Department, Regional, National, and International titles in italics. "Defunct" refers to the fact of that sanctioning body in question no longer existing at the start of the racer's career or at that stage of his/her career. Depending on point totals of individual racers, winners of Grand Nationals do not necessarily win National titles. Series and one off Championships are also listed in block.

==== Amateur ====
Australian Bicycle Motocross Association (ABMXA)

Australian Cycling Federation (ACF)

National Bicycle League (NBL)

- None

American Bicycle Association (ABA)

- None

United States Bicycle Motocross Association (USBA)

- None (defunct)

Fédération Internationale Amateur de Cyclisme (FIAC)*

International Bicycle Motocross Federation (IBMXF)*

- None

Union Cycliste Internationale (UCI)*

- 1998 Junior Elite Cruiser World Champion

*See note in professional section

==== Professional ====
Australian Bicycle Motocross Association (ABMXA)

Australian Cycling Federation (ACF)

National Bicycle League (NBL)

- None

American Bicycle Association (ABA)

- 2001 World Champion.
- 2002 National No.2 Pro
- 2003 AA Pro Grandnational Champion
- 2001, 2003 National No.1 Pro.
- 2003 Race Of Champions (ROC) No.1 "AA" Pro.

United States Bicycle Motocross Association (USBA)

- None (defunct)

International Bicycle Motocross Federation (IBMXF)*

- None

Fédération Internationale Amateur de Cyclisme (FIAC)*

- None

Union Cycliste Internationale (UCI)*

- 2004 Senior World Champion

*Note: Beginning in 1991 the IBMXF and FIAC, the amateur cycling arm of the UCI, had been holding joint World Championship events as a transitional phase in merging which began in earnest in 1993. Beginning with the 1996 season the IBMXF and FIAC completed the merger and both ceased to exist as independent entities being integrated into the UCI. Beginning with the 1996 World Championships held in Brighton, England the UCI would officially hold and sanction BMX World Championships and with it inherited all precedents, records, streaks, etc. from both the IBMXF and FIAC.

Pro Series Championships and Invitationals

- 2003 MOTO MAG Hess Cup Champion.

=== Notable accolades ===
- He is a 1998, 2002 Australia Male BMX Cyclist of the year
- He is a 2002 Pro of the Year Golden Crank Award winner.
- He is a 2004 winner of the GT Male BMX Cyclist of the Year.
- He is a 2004 Transworld BMX Number One Rider Award (NORA) CUP winner.
- He is a 2006 Number One Rider Award (NORA) Cup winner.

=== BMX product lines ===
- "The Warlock" Warwick Stevenson signature BMX grip by Bruce Mayer, Applied Techtonics Inc. (ATi).

=== Significant injuries ===
- Broke his left ankle in 1997 and was told by doctors that he would never race again.
- Broke his wrist at the 1999 ABA Spring National in Santa Clara, California on 31 May 1999.
- Broke his hand at the 2003 ABA World Championships.
- Suffered a collapsed right lung and internal bleeding at the ABA National in Oldsmar, Florida in April 2004 after crashing onto a jump in the rhythm section on Saturday (day one). He was sent to the hospital and spent the entire next day in the hospital, where his lung re-inflated on its own. He could not fly home to Arizona and had to stay in Florida a few days when he was told that if he flew the change in the atmospheric pressure inside the aircraft could do serious damage. He was laid up for nearly three months.
- In April 2005 he tore his anterior cruciate ligament in his knee. Unlike in tennis or basketball, cycling doesn't require lateral stability because the athlete doesn't need to be able to stop or launch himself sideways. He was able to race with a leg brace for much of the year. He waited until after the 2005 NBL Grand Nationals to have the surgery.
- Had knee surgery in late October 2005 for the injury he suffered in April 2005 and was laid up for five months until 26 March 2006 NBL Nellis Silver State National in Las Vegas, Nevada.
- Suffered distal radius fracture in his arm at the ABA Sooner Nationals on 4 February 2007 in Guthrie, Oklahoma.
- On 10 May 2007 he had emergency surgery to have his spleen removed. He injured it after a serious training accident in Texas practicing on trails. According to Stevenson, He apparently flat lined on the operating table as a result. Lack of care and infection caused a Staph infection and deep stomach scar. His first race back was the ABA Midwest National in Rockford, Illinois on 15 June 2007.

=== Miscellaneous ===
- In 1999 he set the ABA record for turning "AA" pro from "A" pro in just 33 days.
- He was a coach on MTV's television show Made (Originally aired Thursday, 27 January 2005 during the show's fifth season) in which he taught a girl to ride a BMX bike on a BMX race track over the course of six weeks.
- He was featured on MTV's television show MTV Cribs (originally aired Tuesday, 3 May 2005 season 11, episode 66) which featured a tour Stevenson's former Scottsdale residence he had obtained with the winnings as a pro BMX racer.

== BMX and general press magazine interviews and articles ==
- "ONES of a KIND:The Jamie Staff/Warwick Stevenson Interview" Transworld BMX September 2002 Vol.9 Iss.9 No.71 pg.55 Joint interview of Stevenson and fellow racer Jamie Staff.
- "The Warlock" Moto Mag May/June 2003 Vol.2 No.3 pg.21
- "Warwick Seals The Deal" Transworld BMX March 2004 Vol.11 Iss.3 No.89 pg.46
- "Life in the Fast Lane: Warwick interviews Randy" Transworld BMX April 2004 Vol.11 Iss.4 No.90 pg.36 article featuring both Randy Stumpfhauser and Stevenson with side bar interviews of them interviewing each other.
- "Answers From Warwick" Transworld BMX October 2004 Vol.11 Iss.10 No.96 pg.30 Warwick answers submitted questions by the readers of Transworld BMX.

== BMX magazine covers ==
Note: Only magazines that were in publication at the time of the racer's career(s) are listed unless specifically noted.

Minicycle/BMX Action & Super BMX:

- None

Bicycle Motocross Action & Go:

- None

BMX Plus!:

Snap BMX Magazine & Transworld BMX:

Twenty BMX:

Moto Mag:

- September/October 2002 Vol.1 No.2 (1) in second place behind Kyle Bennett (9).

Bicycles Today & BMX Today (The official NBL publication under two names):

ABA Action, American BMXer, BMXer (The official ABA publication under three names):
