= Magalie Pottier =

French cyclist

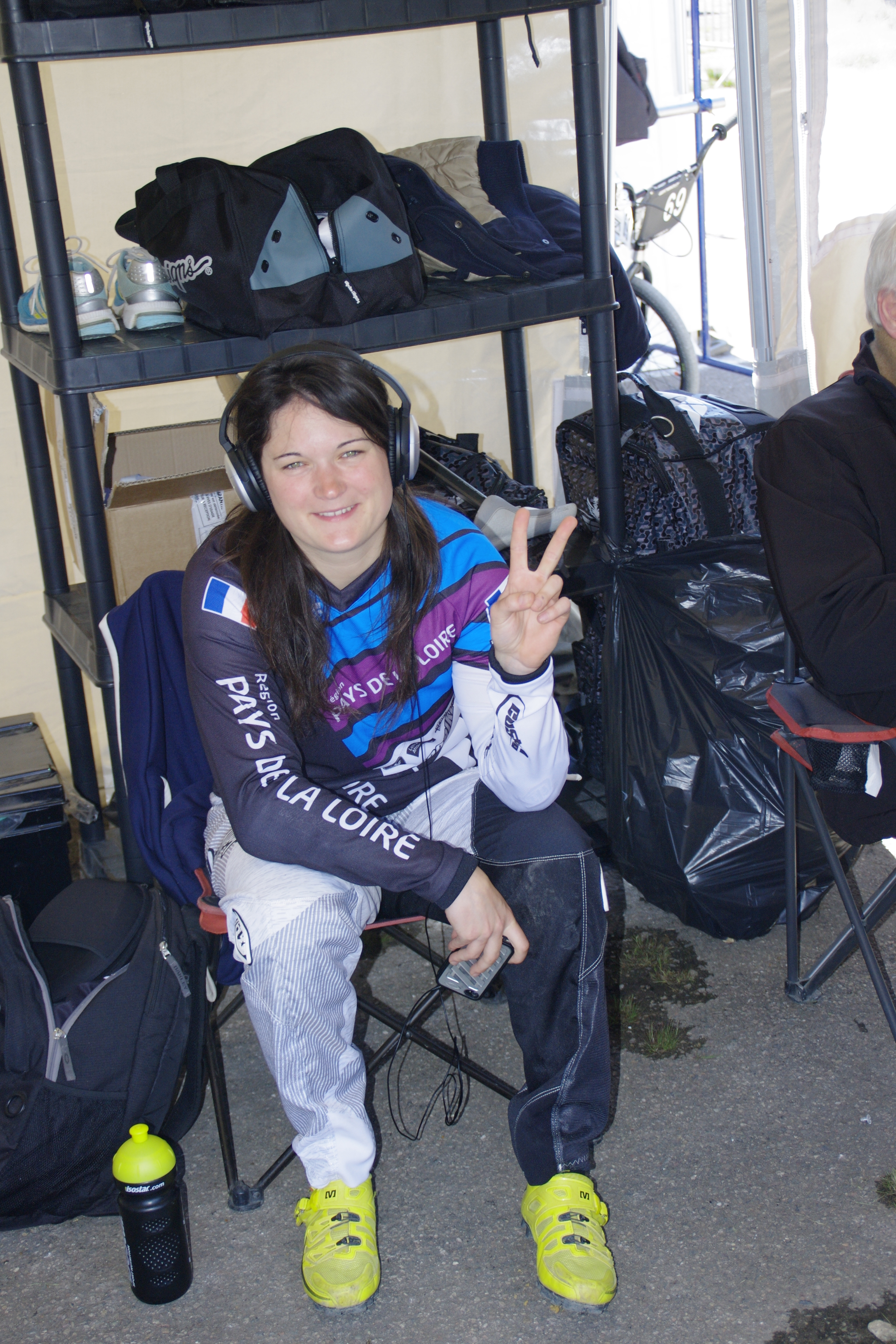

Personal information
- Nationality: French
- Born: 16 March 1989 (age 37) Vallet, Loire-Atlantique, France
- Website: Official Website

Sport
- Country: France
- Sport: Cycling
- Event: BMX racing
- Club: Carquefou BMX Club
- Coached by: Fabrice Vettoretti
Medal record
Women's BMX racing
Representing France
Event	1st	2nd	3rd
World Championships	2	0	1
World Junior Championships	2	0	1
World Cup	0	2	0
World Cup rounds	2	2	1
European Games	0	1	0
Total	6	5	3
World Championships
Gold medal – first place	2008 Taiyuan	BMX cruiser
Gold medal – first place	2012 Birmingham	BMX racing
Bronze medal – third place	2011 Copenhague	BMX racing
World Cup
Silver medal – second place	2011	BMX racing
Silver medal – second place	2012	BMX racing
European Games
Silver medal – second place	2015 Baku	BMX racing
World Junior Championships
Gold medal – first place	2007 Victoria	BMX cruiser
Gold medal – first place	2007 Victoria	BMX racing
Bronze medal – third place	2006 São Paulo	BMX cruiser

Magalie Pottier (born 16 March 1989 in Vallet) is a French racing cyclist who represents France in BMX. She was selected to represent France at the 2012 Summer Olympics in the women's BMX event and finished in seventh place.

Pottier is coached by Fabrice Vettoretti. In 2012, she won both the French and world BMX championships, giving her a total of seven French championships, eleven European championships and seven world championships. She won the World Junior Championship in 2007. She began competing in BMX in 1996 as a 7-year-old and was France's reserve rider for the 2008 Olympics. In June 2015, she competed in the inaugural European Games, for France in cycling, more specifically, Women's BMX. She earned a silver medal.
