= Alfredo Campo =

Ecuadorian BMX rider (born 1993)

Personal information
- Full name: Alfredo José Campo Vintimilla
- Nickname: Alfredo
- Born: 2 March 1993 (age 33) Cuenca, Ecuador
- Height: 193 cm (6 ft 4 in)

Cycling career
- Sport: Cycling
- Current team: ANSR, VIVANT, GRAIMAN
- Discipline: BMX racing
- Role: Rider
- Rider type: Professional BMX Rider

Amateur team
- 2011 Champion

Professional teams
- 2013 Bolivarian Champion (two medals)
- 2015 Pan American Games (silver medal)
Medal record
Men's BMX racing
Representing Ecuador
Event	1st	2nd	3rd
World Junior Championships	1	0	0
World Cup	0	1	0
Pan American Games	1	1	0
Total	2	2	0
World Cup
Silver medal – second place	2019	BMX racing
Pan American Games
Gold medal – first place	2019 Lima	BMX racing
Silver medal – second place	2015 Toronto	BMX racing
World Junior Championships
Gold medal – first place	2011 Copenhagen	BMX racing

Alfredo José Campo Vintimilla (born 2 March 1993) is a professional Ecuadorian male BMX rider, representing his nation at international competitions. He competed UCI jr men world champion, current world number 5 in the Elite class

Trainers: Anderd Gronsund, Aldon Baker, Dra. Catalina Figueroa, Dr. Chris García.

Manager: Alfredo Campo Sr. (Father)
