= Romana Labounková =

Czech cyclist

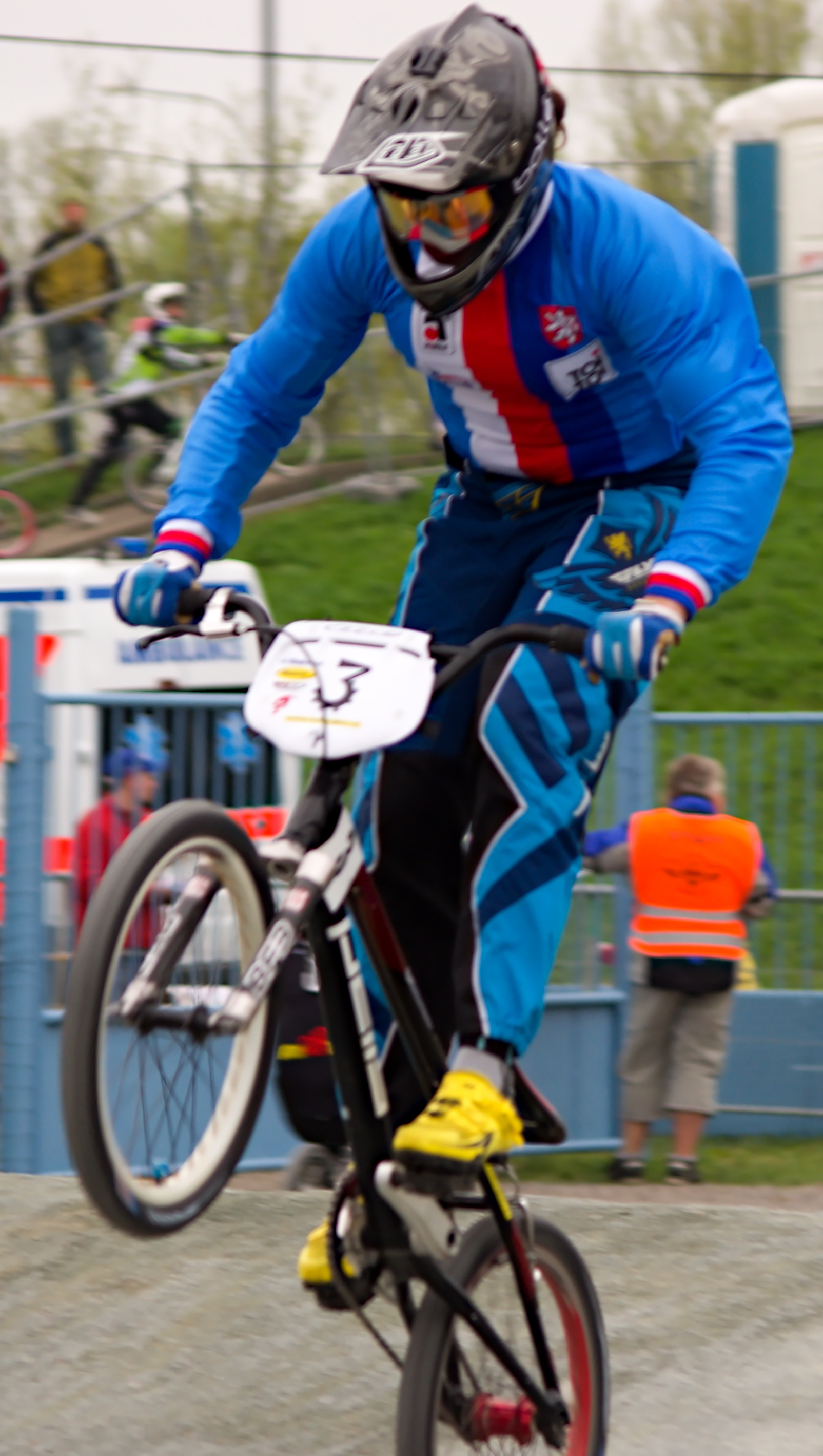
- European championship 2013 in Pardubice, CZE

Personal information
- Nickname: Romča
- Nationality: Czech
- Born: 27 April 1989 (age 37) Jeseník, Olomouc, Czech Republic
- Height: 168 cm (5 ft 6 in)
- Website: www.romanalabounkova.com

Sport
- Country: Czech Republic
- Sport: Cycling
- Event: BMX racing Fourcross
- Club: Bikrosklub Jeseník
- Team: Pells Team
- Coached by: Jan Cacek

Achievements and titles
- Olympic finals: 11th. place Olympic games London 2012
Medal record
Representing Czech Republic
Women's BMX racing
World Championships
Silver medal – second place	2010 Pietermaritzburg	BMX cruiser
Bronze medal – third place	2012 Birmingham	BMX racing
Women's mountain bike racing
World Championships
Silver medal – second place	2012 Leogang-Saalfelden	Four-cross
Bronze medal – third place	2008 Val Di Sole	Four-cross

Romana Labounková (Czech pronunciation: [ˈromana ˈlabounkovaː]; born 27 April 1989) is a Czech racing cyclist who represents the Czech Republic in BMX. She represented the Czech Republic at the 2012 Summer Olympics in the women's BMX event, finishing in 11th place.
