= Abbie Taylor =

Abbie Taylor (born 3 September 1993) is a professional BMX racer from Sheffield, United Kingdom. Taylor was born in High Wycombe, and came from a family with a background in BMX and began riding aged six years old. In 2011, she won the silver medal in the Junior World Championships. She was a reserve for the Great Britain side at the 2012 Summer Olympics having won a bronze medal in the Elite women's final at the UCI Supercross in Abbotsford Canada. In 2014, she was selected in the Great Britain side for the 2014 UCI BMX Racing World Cup.
