= 2012 UCI BMX World Championships =

- Venue: Birmingham, United Kingdom
- Date(s): 23–27 May 2012
- Stadium: National Indoor Arena
- Events: 8

The 2012 UCI BMX World Championships were the seventeenth edition of the UCI BMX World Championships and took place in Birmingham in the United Kingdom and crowned world champions in the cycling discipline of BMX racing.

== Medal summary ==
Event	Gold	Silver	Bronze
Men's events
Elite Men	Sam Willoughby; Australia	Joris Daudet; France	Moana Moo-Caille; France
Junior Men	Carlos Ramírez; Colombia	Maliek Blyndloss; United States	Léopold Tramier; France
Elite Men Time Trial	Connor Fields; United States	Liam Phillips; United Kingdom	Sylvain André; France
Junior Men Time Trial	Romain Mahieu; France	Carlos Ramírez; Colombia	Lain Van Ogle; United States
Women's events
Elite Women	Magalie Pottier; France	Eva Ailloud; France	Romana Labounková; Czech Republic
Junior Women	Felicia Stancil; United States	Nadja Pries; Germany	Dani George; United States
Elite Women Time Trial	Caroline Buchanan; Australia	Shanaze Reade; United Kingdom	Eva Ailloud; France
Junior Women Time Trial	Felicia Stancil; United States	Nadja Pries; Germany	Simone Christensen; Denmark

== Medal table ==
* Host nation (Great Britain)

Rank	Nation	Gold	Silver	Bronze	Total
1	United States (USA)	3	1	2	6
2	France (FRA)	2	2	4	8
3	Australia (AUS)	2	0	0	2
4	Colombia (COL)	1	1	0	2
5	Germany (GER)	0	2	0	2
5	Great Britain (GBR)*	0	2	0	2
7	Czech Republic (CZE)	0	0	1	1
7	Denmark (DEN)	0	0	1	1
Totals (8 entries)		8	8	8	24
