= Sean Gaian =

American BMX rider

Personal information
- Born: 19 February 1996 (age 30) Washington, D.C., U.S.

Cycling career
- Sport: Cycling
- Current team: United States
- Discipline: BMX racing
- Role: Rider

Sean Gaian (born 19 February 1996) is an American male BMX rider, representing his nation at international competitions. He competed in the time trial event at the 2015 UCI BMX World Championships.
