= Václav Hladík =

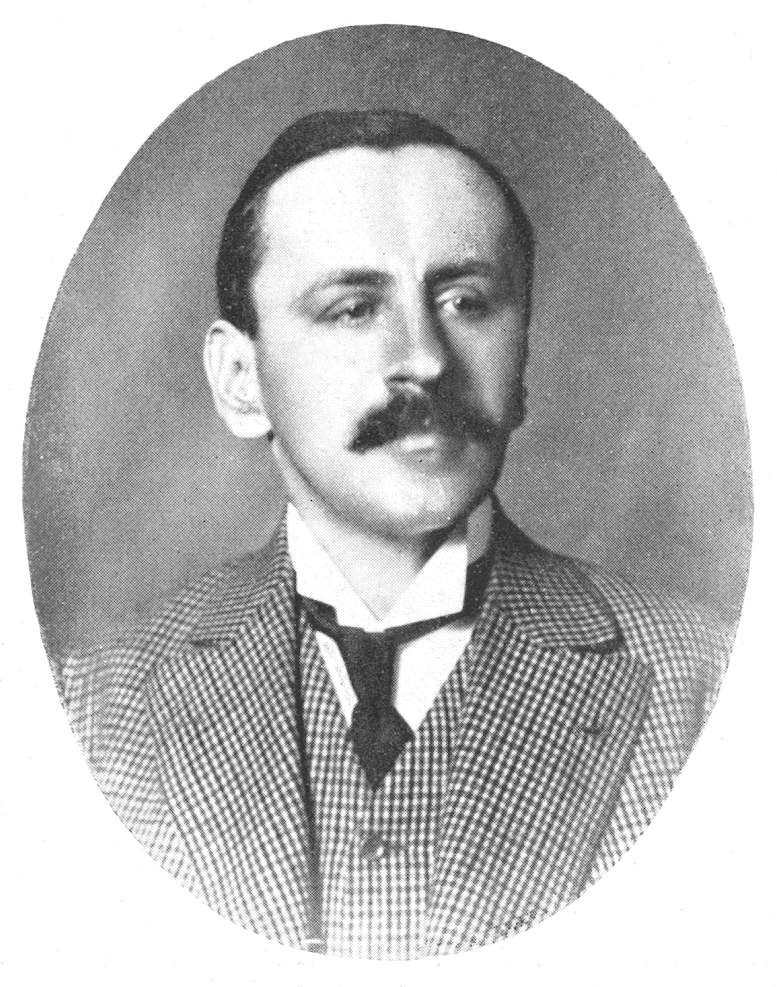
Václav Hladík

Václav Hladík (August 22, 1868 in Prague - April 29, 1913 in Prague) was a Czech novelist, journalist and translator. Being prolific and somewhat popular in his time, his name and works later fell into obscurity.

== Life ==
Hladík studied at a gymnasium and a commercial academy in Prague. In 1887, while working as a clerk in Živnostenská bank, he started to study at a business academy in Prague. In 1891 he became editor in newspaper Národní politika. Between 1899 - 1906 Hladík was the editor-in-chief of Czech literary magazine Lumír and in this role he frequently travelled to France, England, Italy, the Netherlands, Belgium and Germany. In 1908 he was awarded by the Presidential Gold Medal for promoting French-Czech cultural relations.

== Literary work ==
Hladík was influenced by the French naturalism. His novels attempted to portray life of contemporary upper classes of the Czech society. As a translator he concentrated mainly on Alphonse Daudet and Guy de Maupassant.

== Publications ==
- Z lepší společnosti(1892)
- Z pražského ovzduší (1894)
- Třetí láska (novel, 1895)
- Ze samotě a společnosti (three modern histories, travel sketches, 1899)
- Samoty
- Trest (novel, 1901)
- Vášeň a síla (novel, 1902)
- Závrať (drama, 1902, premiered in the same year at the National Theater in Prague)
- Evžen Voldán (two-part novel, 1905)
- Valentinovy ženy (1906)
- Barevné skizzy a malé povídky, 1891-1905 (short stories, 1906)
- Vlnobití (short stories, 1908)
- O současné Francii (letters from 1894 to 1907 travels in France, 1909)
- Dobyvatelé

== Trivia ==
Hladík's name possibly inspired Jorge Luis Borges for the main character of the story The Secret Miracle (see the article for details).
