= 2021 UCI BMX World Championships =

2021 World Championships
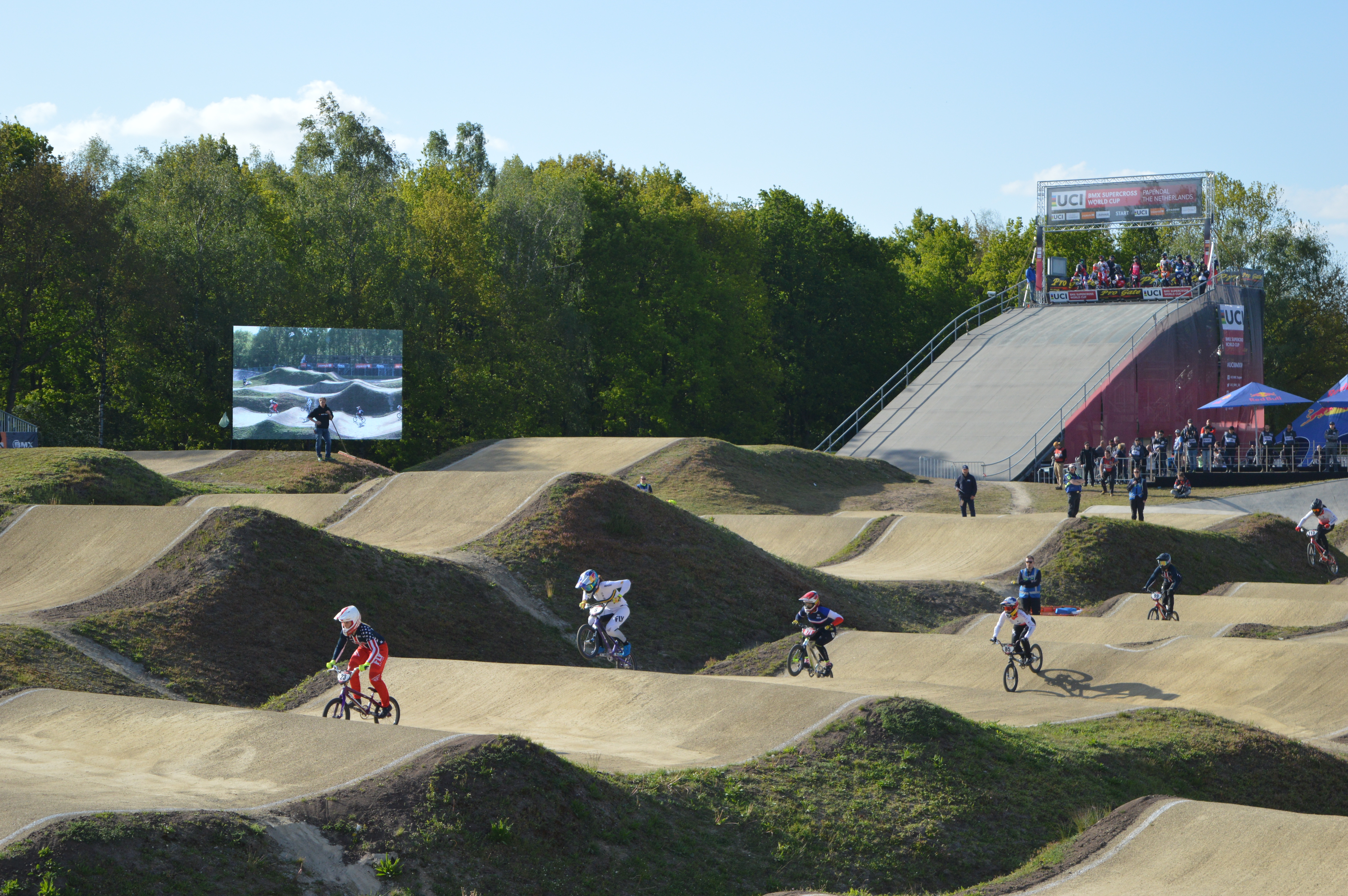
- Venue: Papendal
- Location: Arnhem, Netherlands
- Dates: 20 to 22 August 2021

The 2021 UCI BMX World Championships was held from 20 to 22 August 2021 at Papendal in Arnhem in Netherlands.

== Medal summary ==
=== Elite events ===
Event	Gold		Silver		Bronze	
Men	Niek Kimmann; Netherlands	34.337	Sylvain André; France	34.500	David Graf; Switzerland	34.852
Women	Beth Shriever; Great Britain	35.110	Judy Baauw; Netherlands	36.375	Laura Smulders; Netherlands	36.468

=== Junior events ===
Event	Gold		Silver		Bronze	
Men	Marco Radaelli; Italy	36.883	Louison Rousseau; France	37.043	Drew Polk; United States	37.658
Women	Mariane Beltrando; France	36.230	Teigen Pascual; Canada	36.955	Michelle Wissing; Netherlands	37.267

== Medal table ==
* Host nation (Netherlands)

Rank	Nation	Gold	Silver	Bronze	Total
1	France (FRA)	1	2	0	3
2	Netherlands (NED)*	1	1	2	4
3	Great Britain (GBR)	1	0	0	1
3	Italy (ITA)	1	0	0	1
5	Canada (CAN)	0	1	0	1
6	Switzerland (SUI)	0	0	1	1
6	United States (USA)	0	0	1	1
Totals (7 entries)		4	4	4	12

== See also ==
- 2021 UCI Urban Cycling World Championships
- 2020 UCI Track Cycling World Championships – Men's keirin
- 2020 UCI Track Cycling World Championships – Women's keirin
