= Randy Stumpfhauser =

American bicycle motocross racer (born 1977)

Personal information
- Full name: Randall Richard Stumpfhauser
- Nicknames: "Stumpdog", "Stumpy"
- Born: January 27, 1977 (age 49) Fresno, California, United States
- Height: 1.70 m (5 ft 7 in)
- Weight: 77 kg (170 lb)

Cycling career
- Sport: Cycling
- Current team: GHP
- Discipline: Bicycle Motocross (BMX)
- Role: Racer, Math teacher
- Rider type: Off Road

Amateur teams
- 1990: Hi-Tech Racing
- 1991-1993: Action Racing
- 1993-1995: Powerlite Industries

Professional teams
- 1996: Powerlite Industries
- 1996: ELF
- 1997-2003: Huffy Bicycles
- 2004-2008: GT Bicycles/Hyundai
- 2008-2010: GHP
Medal record
Men's BMX racing
Representing United States
World Cup
Silver medal – second place	2005	BMX racing

Randall Richard Stumpfhauser (born January 27, 1977) is an American professional "Mid School" Bicycle Motocross (BMX) racer whose prime competitive years started in 1988. He is sometimes called "Stumpdog" or "Stumpy", all are plays on his last name. He is a 2022 USA BMX Hall of Fame inductee in the category of Racer.

== Racing career milestones ==
Note: Professional firsts are on the national level unless otherwise indicated.

Milestone	Event Details
Started racing:	August 1986 at age nine, when his father took him to a BMX track in Sanger, California.
Sanctioning body:	
First race bike:	
First race result:	First in 9 novice. He beat one boy and one girl.
First win (local):	See above.
First national win:	
First sponsor:	1990 Hi-Tech Racing. This was his first sponsor after three years of racing.
Turned Professional:	November 1995 at 18 years of age after the American Bicycle Association (ABA) Grandnationals.
First Professional race result:	First in Superclass at the National Bicycle League's (NBL) Christmas Classic Nationals in Columbus, Ohio, in late December 1995 (Day 1). He also came in fourth in Pro/Super Award (Day 1).
First Professional win:	See above
First Junior Men/SX/Pro* race result:	See above
First Junior Men/SX/Pro win:	See above
First Senior Pro/Elite Men** race result:	Second in "AA" pro at the ABA Springnationals in Santa Clara, California, on May 24, 1996 (Day 1).
First Senior Pro/Elite Men win:	In "AA" at the ABA Great Northwest Nationals in Grants Pass, Oregon, in July 1996.
Height and weight at height of his career:	Ht:5'6.5" Wt:~165 lbs.
Retired:	Retired

*In the NBL "B" Pro/Super Class/"A" Pro/Junior Men/Super X (SX) depending on the era; in the ABA it is "A" Pro.
**In the NBL it is "A" Pro/Elite Men; in the ABA it is "AA" Pro.

=== Career factory and major bike shop sponsors ===
Note: This listing only denotes the racer's primary sponsors. At any given time a racer could have numerous ever changing co-sponsors. Primary sponsorships can be verified by BMX press coverage and sponsor's advertisements at the time in question. When possible exact dates are given.

==== Amateur ====
- Hi Tech Racing: 1990
- Action Racing: 1991-1993
- Powerlite Industries: 1993-February 1996 Stumpfhauser turned pro with this sponsor

==== Professional ====
- Powerlite Industries: 1993-February 1996
- ELF (Extra Light Frames): February 1996-Late December 1996. Stumpfhauser's last race for ELF was the 1996 NBL Christmas Classice in December 1996.
- Huffy Bicycles: January 1997-December 2003. Huffy decided to drop its entire BMX team and pull out of its BMX effort after the 2003 season.
- GT (Gary Turner) Bicycles/Hyundai: January 7, 2004-October 2008
- GHP (Greg Hill Products): October 29, 2008–Present.

=== Career bicycle motocross titles ===
Note: Listed are District, State/Provincial/Department, Regional, National, and International titles in italics. "Defunct" refers to the fact of that sanctioning body in question no longer existing at the start of the racer's career or at that stage of his/her career. Depending on point totals of individual racers, winners of Grand Nationals do not necessarily win National titles. Series and one off Championships are also listed in block.

==== Amateur/Junior Men/Super X ====
National Bicycle League (NBL)

- 1991 14 Cruiser Grandnational Champion
- 1991 14 Cruiser National No.1
- 1993 16 Expert and 16 Cruiser National No.1
- 1994 17 Expert Grandnational Champion
- 1994 17 Expert and 17 Cruiser National No.1

American Bicycle Association (ABA)

- 1994 17 Expert Grandnational Champion
- 1995 World Cup 17-20 Cruiser Champion.
- 1995 18 Expert and 17-20 Cruiser Grandnational Champion
- 1995 18 Cruiser National No.1.

United States Bicycle Motocross Association (USBA)

- None

Fédération Internationale Amateur de Cyclisme (FIAC)*

- None

International Bicycle Motocross Federation (IBMXF)*

- 1994 16-17 Cruiser Bronze Medal World Champion.

Union Cycliste Internationale (UCI)*

- 1995 Junior Men Silver Medal World Cup Champion

* See note in professional section.

=== Notable accolades ===
- Randy Stumpfhauser has been very prolific in terms of winning the cruiser class of various sanctioning bodies. As of November 2006 he has 15 National and World Championships, 14 of them as a professional; he has won the ABA Pro Cruiser title five consecutive times between 2001 and 2005. He has won the NBL Pro Cruiser division six times, five of them consecutively between 2001 and 2005. He has won the UCI Elite Men Cruiser World Championship four consecutive times between 2002 and 2005. Isolating one block of time he was the Cruiser champion in three different sanctioning bodies-ABA, NBL, UCI-simultaneously for three consecutive years: 2002, 2003, and 2004. In the midst of this accomplishment he won the NBL "AA" National No.1 Pro for the 20" division in 2003. Not to be forgotten are his amateur NBL National age group cruiser titles; his 1995 ABA Amateur National Cruiser No.1 and 1995 ABA World Cup Cruiser championship titles and his 1998 NBL Pro Cruiser National No.1.
- He was called one of the top amateurs in the country by BMX Plus! in 1995 along with Greg Romero, Andy Contes, Kevin Royal and George Andrews.
- He is a 1996 ABA BMXer magazine Golden Crank "Rookie of the Year" winner.
- He is a 2006 ABA "AA" pro PRO Holeshot Award winner.
- He is the winner of the 2009 Golden Crank Award Pro of the Year.
- He is a 2022 USA BMX Hall of Fame inductee in the category of Racer.

=== BMX product lines ===
- 1999 Huffy Supercharger Randy Stumpfhauser Signature Series

Product Evaluations:
Snap BMX Magazine December 2000 Vol.7 Iss.12 No.50 pg.112 (2001 model year)

=== Significant injuries ===
- Tore two ligaments in his right knee at the NBL Sea Otter Classic in Monterey, California, on March 23, 1997. He underwent reconstructive surgery. He was laid up for nine months total including time to recover from the surgery. His first race back was the NBL Christmas Classic in Columbus, Ohio, on December 28, 1997.
- Tore ligament in his left knee in 1998
- He suffered a broken collarbone, scapula and a rib in a crash at the UCI SX race in Fréjus, France, in October 2007. He came unclipped from one of his pedals in the first straight in his third moto and hit a roller jump, lost control and flipped over the handlebars. He slammed against a following jump going into the first turn. He missed the 2007 ABA Grandnationals and was hoping to race the 2007 NBL Christmas Classic.

=== Miscellaneous ===
- Stumpfhauser holds a B.S. in Engineering

== 2008 Summer Olympics ==
The dream of Stumpfhauser to participate at the 2008 Summer Olympics not realized because of the 5th place in the trials.

== BMX interviews and articles ==
- "The Top Amateurs In the Country" BMX Plus! February 1995 Vol.18 No.2 pg.67
- "The Wheels of Change: Randy Stumpfhauser" Snap BMX Magazine May/June 1997 Vol.4 No.3 Iss.16 pg.46 One of four separate interviews with pros with recent sponsorship changes including Scott Yoquelet, Bogi Givens, & Lawan Cunningham.
- "Q&A: If you could race one race over again, which would it be?" Snap BMX Magazine December 1999 Vol.6 Iss.10 No.38 pg.42 Single question interview asked of Stumpfhauser and four other profession racers including Christophe Lévêque, Michelle Cairns, Neal Wood, and Jamie Lilly.
- "From One Track to Another" Transworld BMX May 2003 Vol.10 Iss.5 No.79 pg.32 An article written by pro BMX racer Jason Richardson the described the tryouts on a Velodrome track at USA Cycling's United States Olympic Training Center (USOTC) from January 8 to 14 2003 with Steven Alfred (track racer), Jason Carnes, Kenneth Fallen, Rob Lindstrom (track racer), Darrin Mitchell, John Purse, Craig Reynolds, Richardson himself, Greg Romero, Randy Stumpfhauser and Terry Tenette. Following the lead of Jamie Staff making the British Track Cycling team some of his fellow BMX racers explored the possibility of trying out the track racing discipline with the idea of going to the Olympics. This was done six months before the announcement on June 29, 2003, by the International Olympic Committee (IOC) of their making BMX Racing an Olympic sport beginning in 2008.
- "Life in the Fast Lane: Warwick interviews Randy" Transworld BMX April 2004 Vol.11 Iss.4 No.90 pg.36 article featuring both Stumpfhauser and Warwick Stevenson with side bar interviews of them interviewing each other.
- "Stumpy" Moto Mag March/April 2004 Vol.3 No.2 pg.33

== BMX magazine covers ==
Note: Only magazines that were in publication at the time of the racer's career(s) are listed unless specifically noted.

Minicycle/BMX Action & Super BMX:

- None

Bicycle Motocross Action & Go:

- None

BMX Plus!:

- February 1997 Vol.20 No.2 (200) in middle insert leading; Brian Foster (3) in second; Charles Townsend (10) in fourth; unidentified (16) in third. In top right insert dirt jumper Matt Beringer. In bottom right insert Kiyomi Waller (403). In bottom left insert various helmets.

Snap BMX Magazine & Transworld BMX:

Twenty BMX:

Moto Mag:

- May/June 2003 Vol.2 No.3 (2) ahead of Christian Becerine (4) and Nate Berkheimer (8) and several other unidentified racers.
- March/April 2004 Vol.3 No.2

BMX World:

Bicycles Today & BMX Today (The official NBL membership publication under two names):

ABA Action, American BMXer, BMXer (The official ABA membership publication under three names):

USBA Racer (The official USBA membership publication):
