= Dale Holmes =

English bicycle motocross rider

Personal information
- Born: 6 October 1971 (age 55) Heanor, Derbyshire, England, UK
- Height: 1.73 m (5 ft 8 in)
- Weight: 80 kg (176 lb)

Cycling career
- Sport: Cycling
- Current team: Dvide
- Discipline: Bicycle Motocross (BMX)
- Role: Racer / Coach / Team Owner

Amateur teams
- 1982: Nottingham Outlaws
- 1983/84: Bunneys/GT
- 1985: JMC (Shenpar)
- 1986/87: Powerlite

Dale Holmes (born 6 October 1971) is a retired British professional "Old/Mid School" Bicycle Motocross (BMX) racer whose prime competitive years were from 1983 to 2009. He now lives in San Diego, California.

== Racing career milestones ==
Note: Professional first are on the national level unless otherwise indicated.

Started Racing: 1982, aged 10, in England. He first noticed BMX seeing a BMX Magazine back in 1980.

First race result: Fourth place in 9 year age group at the Nottingham Outlaws BMX track in Nottingham, England.

Sanctioning Body:

First win (local):

First sponsor: Bunneys Bike Shop (Private Company)

First national win: At a 1985 United Kingdom National in Slough, England in 13 Expert.

Turned Professional: Summer 1988 at 16 in England directly after the 1988 IBMXF European Championships.

First Professional race result: Second Place in Superclass Poole UKBMX National.

First Professional win: BBMXA British Championships 1988.

First National win: 13 Expert Slough 1985.

First Pro/ Superclass win: BBMXA British Championships 1988.

Retired from Elite: In late 2006 (Final Event UCI Japan) to concentrate on 4-Cross Mountain Bike (MTB) Racing and Team Manager roll of Free Agent. He recently started BMX racing again in the ABA Veteran's Pro class. His debut race was on 1 September 2007 at the ABA Black Jack Nationals in Reno, Nevada. He won on Saturday (1 September) and came in second on Sunday.

Height & weight at height of his career (1995–2006): Ht:5'9" Wt:182 lbs.

*In the NBL it is B"/Superclass/"A" pro (beginning with 2000 season); in the ABA it is "A" pro.
**In the NBL it is "A" pro (Elite men); in the ABA it is "AA" pro.

=== Career factory and major bike shop sponsors ===
Note: This listing only denotes the racer's primary sponsors. At any given time a racer could have numerous ever changing co-sponsors. Primary sponsorships can be verified by BMX press coverage and sponsor's advertisements at the time in question. When possible exact dates are given.

==== Amateur/Junior Men ====
- Nottingham Outlaws: 1982
- Bunneys GT: 1983/1984
- JMC Shenpar (James Melton Cyclery) Racing Equipment: 1985
- Powerlite Engineering: 1986/1987

==== Professional/Elite Men ====
- Cyclecraft: 1988 – 1989
- ELF (Extra Light Frames): 1989 – 1990
- MCS (Moto Cross Specialties) Bicycle Specialties (European Division): 1990 – December 1991
- Webco Bicycles: January 1992 – December 1992. This is not the same famous American pioneering Webco Inc. of the early to late 1970s. This Webco is the West European Bicycle Company created in 1991 by Nico & Gerrit Does, the person who introduced BMX to Europe (the Netherlands specifically) and co-founded the IBMXF.
- GT (Gary Turner) Bicycles (UK/Europe): January 1993 – 1999. Holmes was dropped by GT Bicycles the day after the 1999 NBL Grandnationals. According to Todd Corbitt, GT team manager and former pro racer GT, was overstaffed with professionals. Holmes contract still ran until the end of 1999 but GT would release him if he gets an offer of sponsorship from another company.
- Nirve: 26 December 1999 – December 2001
- O'Neal/Atomic: 2002 – late November 2002
- Free Agent: 2002 – 25 November 2013. As the Team Manager of Free Agent World Team post his October 2006 BMX retirement at Elite level. He was also signed by KHS Bicycles to race Mountain Bikes (MTB) at the same time. The 2002 ABA Grand National was his first race with Free Agent.
- Dale Holmes Racing: 2014 Started own team with Chase Bicycles as Title Sponsor
- Dale Holmes Racing: 2016 Dale Holmes Racing with Stay Strong as Title Sponsor
- Dale Holmes Racing: 2017 USA Cycling Development Team with Haro Bikes & Rockstar Energy
- Dale Holmes Racing: 2018 USA Cycling Development Team with Haro Bikes & Rockstar Energy
- Dale Holmes Racing: 2019 Haro
- Dale Holmes Racing: 2020 Haro
- Dale Holmes Racing: 2021 Haro / Dvide
- Dale Holmes Racing: 2022 Haro / Dvide
- Dale Holmes Racing: 2022 Dvide
- Dale Holmes Racing: 2023 Dvide
- Dale Holmes Racing: 2024 Dvide
- Dale Holmes Racing: 2025 Dvide

=== Career bicycle motocross titles ===
==== Amateur/Junior Men ====
National Bicycle Motocross Association (NBMXA)(UKBMX)

- 1985 NBMXA 13 Expert National No.1
- 1987 NBMXA 15 Expert and 14 & 15 Cruiser National No.1
- 1987 UKBMX 15 Expert National No.1
- 1987 UKBMX 15 Expert Champion of Champions 1st
- 1988 NBMXA 16 Expert British Champion
- 1988 NBMXA 16+ Cruiser British Champion
- 1988 NBMXA Superclass British Champion
- 1988 NBMXA Triple British Champion winning 3 Classes same day
- 1988 UKBMX Champion of Champions 1st place Superclass

International Bicycle Motocross Federation (IBMXF)*

- 1985 13 Expert European Championships Spain 6th
- 1986 14 Expert European Championships Germany 7th
- 1987 15 Expert European Championships Belgium 2nd
- 1987 14–15 Cruiser European Championships Belgium 7th
- 1987 15 Expert European Cup 2nd Netherlands
- 1987 14–15 Cruiser European Cup 1st Netherlands
- 1988 16 Expert European Championships Netherlands 8th
- 1988 16–17 Cruiser European Championships Netherlands 2nd
- 1988 16 Expert European Cup 1st Netherlands
- 1988 16 Expert Romford International England 1st

*See note in professional section

==== Professional/Elite Men ====
Turned Professional 1988 Age 16

English Bicycle Motocross Association (EBA) (UK)

- 1989 EBA British Champion
- 1989 EBA National Champion
- 1990 EBA Cruiser British Champion
- 1990 EBA National Champion
- 1990 EBA Cruiser National Champion
- 1991 EBA British Champion
- 1991 EBA Cruiser British Champion
- 1991 EBA National Champion
- 1993 EBA Cruiser British Champion
- 1994 EBA National Champion
- 1994 EBA Cruiser National Champion
- 1994 EBA British Champion
- 1994 EBA Cruiser British Champion
- 1995 EBA National Champion
- 1995 EBA Cruiser National Champion
- 1995 EBA British Champion
- 1995 EBA Cruiser British Champion
- 1996 EBA National Champion
- 1997 EBA National Champion
- 1997 EBA British Champion
- 1998 EBA British Champion
- 1999 EBA British Champion
- 2000 EBA British Champion

British Cycling Bicycle Motocross (BCBMX) (BCF )

- 2002 British Champion
- 2003 Cruiser British Champion
- 2004 British Champion
- 2004 Cruiser British Champion
- 2005 Cruiser British Champion

National Bicycle League (NBL)

- 1999 Pro Class/Pro Open/Pro Cruiser Triple Big Bear Nationals (3 Pro Wins same day )
- 1999 Pro Class and Pro Cruiser Grand National Champion
- 1999 National No.1 Pro Cruiser
- 2009 2010 Elite Masters National No.1

American Bicycle Association (ABA)

- 1993 ABA Grand Nationals winner A Pro
- 1999 National No.1 Pro Cruiser
- 1999 ABA World Champion Pro Cruiser
- 1999 ABA World Champion AA Pro
- 2001 20" World Cup Champion
- 2001 ABA Grand Nationals Pro Open Champion
- 2007 Grand Nationals Veteran Pro Champion
- 2007 Disney Cup Veteran Pro Champion
- 2008 Disney Cup Veteran Pro Champion

International Bicycle Motocross Federation (IBMXF)*

- 1986 14–15 Cruiser Bronze Medal World Championship

Union Cycliste Internationale (UCI)*

- 1993 Elite Men Silver Medal World Championship
- 1994 Elite Cruiser Bronze Medal World Championship
- 1995 Elite Men Silver Medal European Championship
- 1996 Elite Men World Champion
- 1996 Elite Men European Champion
- 1997 Elite Men World Cup Champion
- 1997 Elite Men European Champion
- 1997 Elite Cruiser Bronze Medal World Championship
- 1998 Elite Cruiser Silver Medal World Championship
- 2000 Elite Men Bronze Medal World Championship
- 2001 Elite Men World Champion
- 2001 Elite Cruiser Silver Medal World Championship
- 2008 Masters World Champion
- 2008 35–40 Cruiser World Champion
- 2009 Masters Silver Medal World Championship
- 2009 35–40 Cruiser World Champion

*Note: Beginning in 1991 the IBMXF and FIAC, the amateur cycling arm of the UCI, had been holding joint World Championship events as a transitional phase in merging which began in earnest in 1993. Beginning with the 1996 season the IBMXF and FIAC completed the merger and both ceased to exist as independent entities being integrated into the UCI. Beginning with the 1996 World Championships held in Brighton, England the UCI would officially hold and sanction BMX World Championships and with it inherited all precedents, records, streaks, etc. from both the IBMXF and FIAC.

Pro Series Championships and Invitationals

=== Notable accolades ===
- 1996 British Cyclist of the Year
- 1998 Inducted into the European BMX Hall of Fame
- 2009 Inducted into the British Cycling Hall of Fame
- 2025 Inducted into the British BMX Hall of Fame
- 2 x European Champion
- 1 x UCI World Cup Champion
- 5 x World Champion
- 5 x UCI World Team Championships
- 3 x US National Champion
- 2 x ABA World Champion

=== Significant injuries ===
- Broke hand at the UCI World Championships in Paris, France on 31 July 2005 laid up until December 2005. He took a brief hiatus from racing after the hand healed.

=== Miscellaneous ===
- Holmes is a contributing writer for BMX Plus! magazine. He has a monthly side bar news article in BMX Plus!'s "Inside Scoop" section called the "Dale Holmes Update".
- In 2003, just before the ABA Reno, Nevada National, Holmes was doing practice sprints on his race bike when he was accosted and mugged by two men one armed with a knife, the other with a gun, which he pointed at Holmes' head. They proceeded to rob Holmes of his backpack and race bike. Holmes was unharmed.
- Holmes is the Team Manager of the 2 x Olympic Gold Medalist, Maris Strombergs.
- Team Managed Free Agent to 3 x UCI World Champion Team Titles.
- 2 x Member of Team GT World Championships Team wins during UCI World Championships.
- During the 2012 London Olympic Games, Holmes was the guest TV pundit for BBC's live coverage of the BMX event.
- Dale Holmes has been featured on YouTuber, FaZe Rug's channel on a number of occasions introducing BMX Racing to a larger audience.

== BMX press magazine interviews and articles ==
- "On the Squad" BMX Biker Monthly 1984 No.8 pg.36 (Extended photo caption in bold typeface)
- "Dale Holmes Takes The Title!" BMX Plus! December 1996 Vol.19 No.12 pg.44 Brief interview on how he won the 1996 Elite Men UCI World Championship.
- "Q&A: Have you ever cheated racing?" Snap BMX Magazine May 1999 Vol.6 Iss.3 No.31 pg.25 One of 10 separate interviews of different racers including Brian Foster and Matt Hadan asking if they ever cheated during a race.
- "Dale Holmes Rides" Moto Mag July/August 2003 Vol 2, No 3, p. 27

== Post BMX career ==
He retired from Elite racing in October 2006 to pursue a Mountain Bike Racing Career full-time. However, as of November 2007 he is team manager of the Free Agent World Team in BMX and has returned to BMX racing in the Veteran Pro Class. He continues to race mountain bike four-cross for KHS. At the time of his BMX retirement he said it was just time for a change:

"It's time for a change, I love BMX racing but decided the life style it takes to be in the top 10 in the World at my age is a lot of work and dedication. The older you get the more you have got to do to prepare yourself correctly, and I feel after reaching all my goals it's a hell of a lot of work just to be where I have already been for the last 15 years. It would be nice to sit and drink a beer or have a few glasses of wine without worrying about being up at 7am to do some sprints, or not getting my eight hours sleep in without stressing. Not that I'm done with that, I still love training and the life style, but alongside that, the way the direction, the tracks and sport is going, at my age I really don't feel comfortable putting it on the line week in week out anymore. I can still race 4X MTB, which is not quite as crazy, have an off season, something BMX racing does not allow, enjoy life a bit more and hopefully still be a top 5 4X guy in the World with some more bike time."

— fatbmx.com 6 November 2007

== Mountain bike career record ==
Started racing: 2002

Sub Discipline: Four-cross

Sanctioning body: UCI

=== Career MTB factory and major Non-factory sponsors ===
Note: This listing only denotes the racer's primary sponsors. At any given time a racer could have numerous ever changing co-sponsors. Primary sponsorships can be verified by MTB press coverage and sponsor's advertisements at the time in question. When possible exact dates are given.

==== Professional ====
- Orange: 2001 – 2002
- KHS Bicycles: 2002 – 2013

=== Career Mountain Bike Racing (MTB) titles ===
Note: Listed are Regional, National and International titles.

==== Professional ====
British Cycling

- 2 x British National 4-Cross Champion
- 4-Cross European Championships 3rd
- 2005 4-Cross World Championship 7th

== Honours ==
1998 Inducted into the European BMX Hall of Fame

In 2009, he was inducted into the British Cycling Hall of Fame.

2025 Inducted into the British BMX Hall of Fame
