= Kyle Bennett (BMX rider) =

American bicycle motocross rider

Personal information
- Nickname: Butter
- Born: September 25, 1979 Conroe, Texas, U.S.
- Died: October 14, 2012 (aged 33) Conroe, Texas, U.S.
- Height: 1.83 m (6 ft 0 in)
- Weight: 77.1 kg (170 lb)

Cycling career
- Sport: Cycling
- Current team: ORP
- Discipline: Bicycle Motocross (BMX)
- Role: Racer
- Rider type: Off Road

Amateur teams
- 1991: S&S Racing
- 1992–?: R&C Racing
- 1994: ODi
- 1995–?: S&M Bicycles

Professional teams
- 2000: OPRP/Standard Bykes
- 2000–2003: Nirve Sports
- 2003–2012: Free Agent BMX
- Jan–June 2012: GHP Racing
- June 2012 – Oct 14, 2012: ORP
Medal record
Men's BMX racing
Representing United States
World Cup
Bronze medal – third place	2008	BMX racing

Kyle Bennett (September 25, 1979 – October 14, 2012) was an American professional Bicycle Motocross (BMX) racer and Dirt Jumper whose prime competitive years were from 1999 to 2012. He earned the moniker "Butter" for his smooth riding style. On May 10, 2008 he won an automatic spot on the first US BMX Olympic team, a sport that made its debut in the 2008 Summer Olympics. He made it to the finals and finished sixth of the UCI World Cup in Copenhagen, Denmark after winning USA Cycling's year-long series of races as the highest ranking American. and becoming the first member of the BMX Olympic team.

== Racing career ==
Bennett's first exposure to BMX came in 1988. In June 1988 he began to race at NBL local tracks. His name appears for the first time in the August 1988 issue of American BMXer, in the points listing for Texas District 3 ending June 1988; he was in 41st place with 367 points. His first race bike was a Huffy, stripped of paint to reveal a "chrome" finish. His first race result was a last-place finish.

Bennett's first national win was in the 8 Intermediate class at the National Bicycle League (NBL) Lone Star Nationals in Dallas, Texas on July 3, 1988. He turned professional on December 28, 1997, at the NBL Christmas Classic, which he won; he was 18. In the 2008 Olympics, in Beijing, he was the first BMX rider selected for the USA team. He did not qualify for the medal round.

During his career, Bennett suffered several significant injuries. He broke a hand at the Summer X-Games Downhill BMX race in Woodward, Pennsylvania during his semi final on August 19, 2001, suffered multiple leg fractures in a motorcycle accident at 16, suffered a broken collarbone on May 31, 2003, suffered a second broken collarbone in 2004, and required reconstructive surgery on a torn ACL in December 2006.

Bennett's professional career awards include the National Bicycle League's 2004 Elite Men's Grand National Championship. From the American Bicycle Association, his rankings in the BMX AA Pro standings climbed steadily from no. 9 in 2001 to the Grand National Championship in 2009. In the Union Cycliste Internationale he was the Elite Men World Champion in 2002, 2003, and 2007. USA Cycling awarded him the 2008 Elite Men National Championship.

== Miscellaneous ==
Kyle Bennett was the stepson of BMX pro racer John Purse. This makes them technically the only father-son combination to win racing titles in BMX, professional or amateur. They both held the NBL National No. 1 pro title, Bennett in 2002, 2004 and 2007; Purse in 1995 and 1996. Both also won UCI Elite Men World Championships: Purse in 1997 and Bennett in 2002, 2004 and 2007. When Purse was an up-and-coming pro and Bennett was an amateur at the beginning of his career, they were on the same team.

== Death ==
While traveling at high speed in the early hours of October 14, 2012, Bennett's 2006 Toyota Tundra pickup truck went off the road in Conroe, Texas. Bennett was pronounced dead at the scene. Officials said he was not wearing a seat belt, and had a blood alcohol of .145 percent by volume, nearly twice the legal limit in Texas of .08.
