= Cycling at the 2008 Summer Olympics – Men's BMX =

Men's BMX at the Games of the XXIX Olympiad
- Olympic BMX racing
- Venue: Laoshan BMX Field
- Date: August 20, 2008 (seeding and quarterfinals); August 22, 2008 (semifinals and final)
- Competitors: 32 from 20 nations
- Winning time: 36.190

Medalists
1st place, gold medalist(s)		Māris Štrombergs	Latvia
2nd place, silver medalist(s)		Mike Day	United States
3rd place, bronze medalist(s)		Donny Robinson	United States

The men's BMX racing competition at the 2008 Summer Olympics took place on August 20–22 at the Laoshan BMX Field, the first to be officially featured in the Olympic cycling program.

Latvia's Māris Štrombergs powered his lead over the eight-strong final squad from the start to grab his nation's first gold medal at the Games. He stormed home on a sprint run to a finish in 36.190, leaving the American duo Mike Day and Donny Robinson behind at 36.606 and 36.972 for the silver and bronze medals respectively.

== Qualification ==
Thirty-two riders representing twenty countries are qualified for the event. Qualification was based on UCI ranking by nations, 2008 UCI BMX World Championships results and wild-cards reserved to a Tripartite Commission (IOC, ANOC, UCI).

== Competition format ==
Each of the 32 men competing performed two runs of the course in individual time trials to determine seeding for the knockout rounds. Then, they were grouped into 4 quarterfinal groups based on that seeding. Each quarterfinal consisted of three runs of the course, using a point-for-place system. The top four cyclists in each quarterfinal (for a total of 16) moved on to the semifinals. The semifinals also used a three-race point-for-place system to determine which cyclists advanced, with the top four in each of the two semifinals moving on to the final. Unlike the previous two rounds, the final consisted of a single race with the first to the finish line claiming the gold medal.

== Schedule ==
All times are China Standard Time (UTC+8)

Date	Time	Round
Wednesday, 20 August 2008	09:00	Seeding
Wednesday, 20 August 2008	11:40	Quarterfinals
Friday, 22 August 2008	09:00	Semifinals and final

== Results ==
=== Seeding ===
Rank	Name	Time	Notes
1	Mike Day (USA)	35.692	
2	Māris Štrombergs (LAT)	35.910	
3	Damien Godet (FRA)	36.008	
4	Artūrs Matisons (LAT)	36.072	
5	Raymon van der Biezen (NED)	36.112	
6	Sergio Salazar (COL)	36.145	
7	Augusto Castro (COL)	36.301	
8	Jonathan Suárez (VEN)	36.325	
9	Andrés Jiménez (COL)	36.339	
10	Manuel de Vecchi (ITA)	36.351	
11	Jared Graves (AUS)	36.372	
12	Kyle Bennett (USA)	36.421	
13	Sifiso Nhlapo (RSA)	36.428	
14	Roger Rinderknecht (SUI)	36.466	
15	Kamakazi (AUS)	36.492	
16	Ivo Lakučs (LAT)	36.509	
17	Marc Willers (NZL)	36.519	
18	Rob van den Wildenberg (NED)	36.522	
19	Thomas Allier (FRA)	36.649	
20	Michal Prokop (CZE)	36.689	
21	Ramiro Marino (ARG)	36.768	
22	Luke Madill (AUS)	36.795	
23	Robert de Wilde (NED)	36.803	
24	Donny Robinson (USA)	36.810	
25	Emilio Falla (ECU)	36.993	
26	Scott Erwood (CAN)	37.050	
27	Cristian Becerine (ARG)	37.253	
28	Liam Phillips (GBR)	37.392	
29	Henrik Baltzersen (DEN)	37.635	
30	Sebastian Kartfjord (NOR)	38.688	
31	Vilmos Radasics (HUN)	38.830	
32	Akifumi Sakamoto (JPN)	40.548	

=== Quarterfinals ===
==== Heat 1 ====
Rank	Name	1st run	2nd run	3rd run	Total	Notes
1	Mike Day (USA)	36.170 (1)	36.080 (1)	36.122 (1)	3	Q
2	Marc Willers (NZL)	47.614 (4)	36.253 (3)	36.278 (2)	9	Q
3	Donny Robinson (USA)	48.906 (6)	36.235 (2)	36.490 (3)	11	Q
4	Andrés Jiménez (COL)	36.619 (2)	36.939 (5)	36.660 (4)	11	Q
5	Jonathan Suárez (VEN)	53.614 (8)	36.481 (4)	36.789 (5)	17	
6	Emilio Falla (ECU)	37.080 (3)	37.381 (6)	1:02.877 (8)	17	
7	Akifumi Sakamoto (JPN)	48.487 (5)	42.614 (8)	40.046 (6)	19	
8	Ivo Lakučs (LAT)	53.300 (7)	39.213 (7)	57.461 (7)	21	

==== Heat 2 ====
Rank	Name	1st run	2nd run	3rd run	Total	Notes
1	Sifiso Nhlapo (RSA)	36.796 (3)	36.325 (2)	36.507 (1)	6	Q
2	Artūrs Matisons (LAT)	35.903 (1)	36.819 (3)	37.037 (2)	6	Q
3	Raymon van der Biezen (NED)	37.205 (4)	35.878 (1)	1:04.709 (5)	10	Q
4	Kyle Bennett (USA)	36.639 (2)	37.146 (4)	DNF (8)	14	Q
5	Henrik Baltzersen (DEN)	38.561 (8)	39.083 (5)	38.846 (3)	16	
6	Michal Prokop (CZE)	38.535 (7)	41.915 (7)	56.171 (4)	18	
7	Liam Phillips (GBR)	37.773 (5)	41.219 (6)	1:27.010 (7)	18	
8	Ramiro Marino (ARG)	38.202 (6)	DNF (8)	1:16.617 (6)	20	

==== Heat 3 ====
Rank	Name	1st run	2nd run	3rd run	Total	Notes
1	Māris Štrombergs (LAT)	36.762 (1)	35.934 (1)	40.628 (5)	7	Q
2	Rob van den Wildenberg (NED)	37.403 (2)	37.024 (5)	37.176 (1)	8	Q
3	Manuel de Vecchi (ITA)	37.416 (3)	37.284 (6)	37.840 (2)	11	Q
4	Kamakazi (AUS)	42.377 (7)	36.785 (3)	38.463 (3)	13	Q
5	Augusto Castro (COL)	37.609 (4)	36.992 (4)	42.473 (6)	14	
6	Vilmos Radasics (HUN)	38.725 (6)	39.220 (8)	39.276 (4)	18	
7	Robert de Wilde (NED)	54.105 (8)	36.237 (2)	1:08.185 (8)	18	
8	Scott Erwood (CAN)	37.989 (5)	37.653 (7)	50.052 (7)	19	

==== Heat 4 ====
Rank	Name	1st run	2nd run	3rd run	Total	Notes
1	Jared Graves (AUS)	38.067 (1)	36.496 (2)	36.076 (1)	4	Q
2	Cristian Becerine (ARG)	38.399 (2)	42.733 (7)	36.985 (2)	11	Q
3	Roger Rinderknecht (SUI)	54.234 (8)	36.462 (1)	37.136 (3)	12	Q
4	Damien Godet (FRA)	41.241 (3)	40.221 (4)	38.023 (6)	13	Q
5	Sergio Salazar (COL)	54.216 (7)	37.479 (3)	37.573 (5)	15	
6	Thomas Allier (FRA)	41.594 (4)	41.043 (5)	38.037 (7)	16	
7	Luke Madill (AUS)	51.198 (6)	1:02.432 (8)	37.420 (4)	18	
8	Sebastian Kartfjord (NOR)	42.658 (4)	42.625 (6)	38.821 (8)	19	

=== Semifinals ===
==== Semifinal 1 ====
Rank	Name	1st run	2nd run	3rd run	Total	Notes
1	Mike Day (USA)	36.470 (1)	36.219 (1)	37.461 (3)	5	Q
2	Sifiso Nhlapo (RSA)	37.197 (3)	36.597 (3)	36.457 (2)	8	Q
3	Donny Robinson (USA)	36.832 (2)	36.462 (2)	56.249 (6)	10	Q
4	Andrés Jiménez (COL)	37.363 (4)	36.862 (4)	44.507 (5)	13	Q
5	Raymon van der Biezen (NED)	55.121 (7)	37.258 (6)	36.200 (1)	14	
6	Kyle Bennett (USA)	43.518 (5)	37.200 (5)	43.897 (4)	14	
7	Artūrs Matisons (LAT)	53.379 (6)	1:17.170 (8)	DNF (8)	22	
8	Marc Willers (NZL)	1:22.619 (8)	43.256 (7)	DNF (8)	23	

==== Semifinal 2 ====
Rank	Name	1st run	2nd run	3rd run	Total	Notes
1	Māris Štrombergs (LAT)	36.485 (1)	35.969 (1)	36.071 (1)	3	Q
2	Rob van den Wildenberg (NED)	37.277 (3)	36.360 (2)	37.496 (4)	9	Q
3	Jared Graves (AUS)	36.904 (2)	39.296 (5)	37.242 (3)	10	Q
4	Damien Godet (FRA)	37.410 (4)	36.707 (4)	37.805 (6)	14	Q
5	Cristian Becerine (ARG)	37.480 (5)	DNF (8)	37.079 (2)	15	
6	Kamakazi (AUS)	42.551 (7)	41.256 (6)	37.497 (5)	18	
7	Roger Rinderknecht (SUI)	DNF (8)	36.610 (3)	48.734 (8)	19	
8	Manuel de Vecchi (ITA)	38.018 (6)	42.148 (7)	38.208 (7)	20	

== Final ==
Rank	Name	Time	Notes
1st place, gold medalist(s)	Māris Štrombergs (LAT)	36.190	
2nd place, silver medalist(s)	Mike Day (USA)	36.606	
3rd place, bronze medalist(s)	Donny Robinson (USA)	36.972	
4	Andrés Jiménez (COL)	39.137	
5	Rob van den Wildenberg (NED)	39.772	
6	Jared Graves (AUS)	2:19.233	
7	Sifiso Nhlapo (RSA)	DNF	
8	Damien Godet (FRA)	DNF	
