= Damien Godet =

French BMX rider (born 1986)

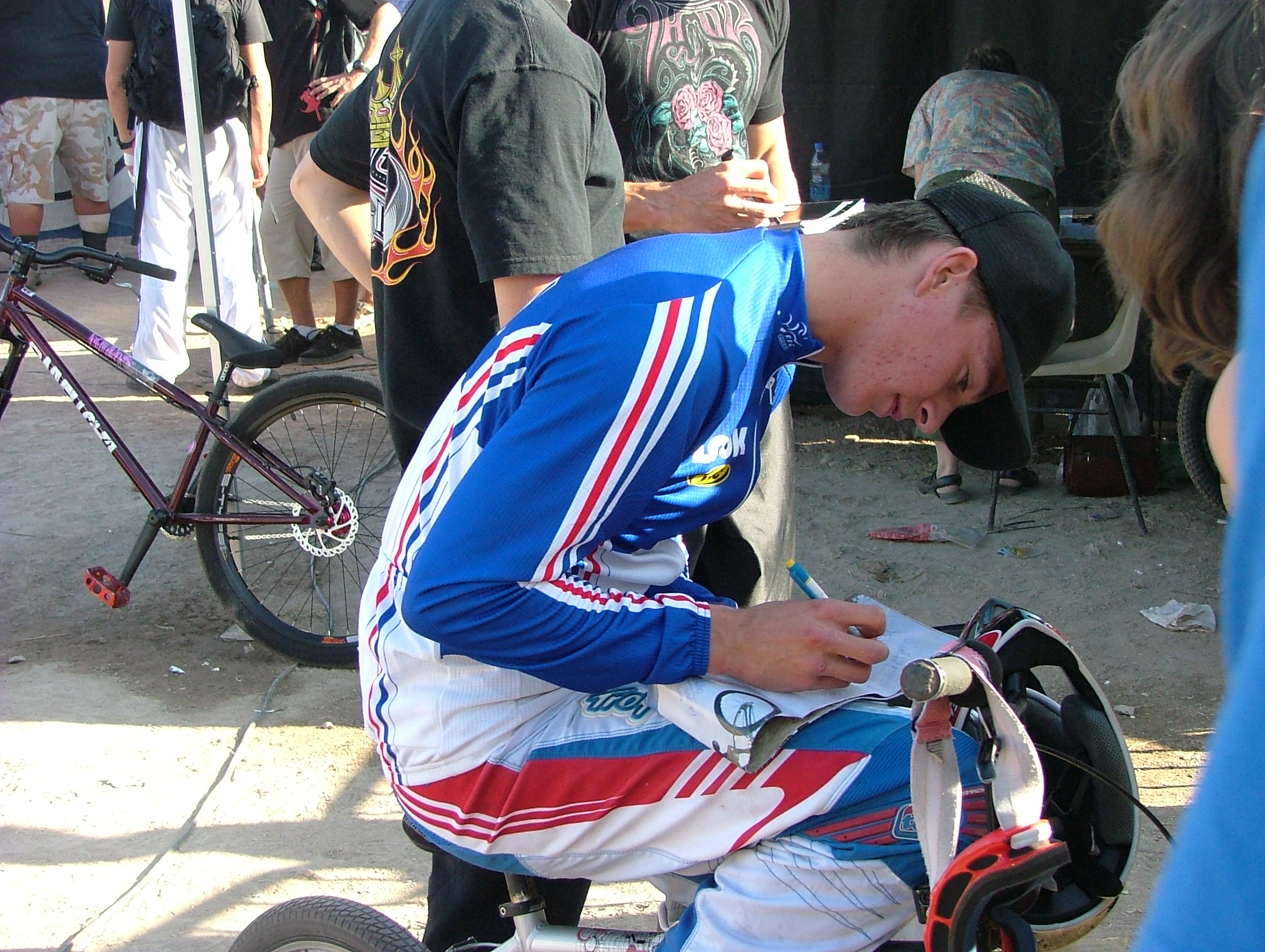
- Godet in 2007

Personal information
- Born: 10 November 1986 (age 39) Sartrouville, France
- Height: 1.81 m (5 ft 11 in)
- Weight: 75 kg (165 lb)

Cycling career
- Sport: Cycling
- Current team: Bicross Club de Dardilly
- Discipline: Bicycle motocross (BMX)
- Role: Rider
- Rider type: Off road
Medal record
Men's BMX racing
Representing France
World Championships
Bronze medal – third place	2006 São Paulo	BMX cruiser
World Cup
Bronze medal – third place	2007	BMX racing

Damien Godet (born 10 November 1986 in Sartrouville, Yvelines) is a French professional BMX cyclist. He won a bronze medal in men's cruiser at the 2006 UCI World Championships in São Paulo, Brazil, and later represented his nation France at the 2008 Summer Olympics. During his sporting career, Godet has trained professionally for Bicross Club de Dardilly in Dardilly under his personal coach Fabrice Vettoretti.

Godet sought headlines on the international scene, as a 20-year-old elite rider, when he first took home the bronze medal in men's cruiser at the 2006 UCI BMX World Championships in São Paulo, Brazil, finishing behind the American tandem Donny Robinson and Daniel Caluag, who later represented his parents' homeland Philippines at the 2012 Summer Olympics.

At the 2008 Summer Olympics in Beijing, Godet qualified for the French squad, along with his teammate Thomas Allier, in men's BMX cycling at the 2008 Summer Olympics in Beijing by finishing fifth from the UCI World Championships in Taiyuan, China and by receiving one of the nation's two available berths from the Union Cycliste Internationale based on his top-ten performance in the BMX World Rankings. Although he was not considered a top medal favorite, Godet surprisingly grabbed the third seed on the morning session in 36.008, and then continued to mount top-four finishes in his quarterfinal and semifinal heats. When the final round had occurred two days later, Godet, along with South Africa's Sifiso Nhlapo, was crashed out into the track curve with a vigorous fall, and consequently failed to complete the race.
