= Robert de Wilde =

Dutch BMX racer (born 1977)

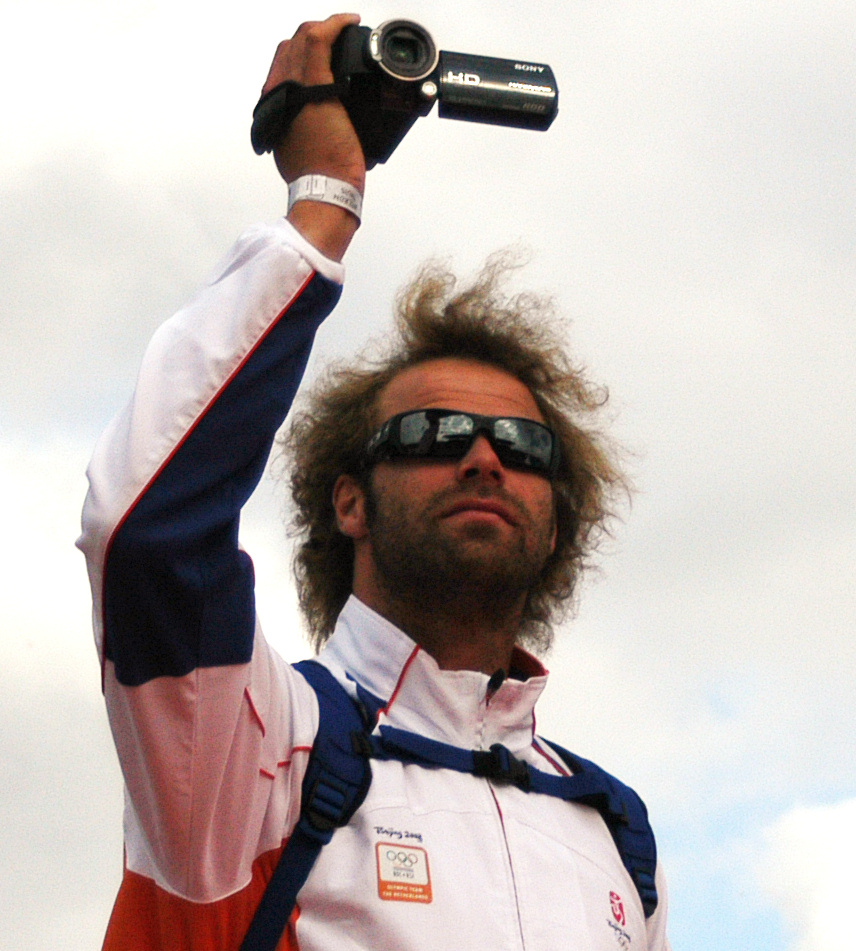

Personal information
- Full name: Robert de Wilde
- Nicknames: "Afro Bob", "The Flying Dutchman"
- Born: April 30, 1977 (age 49) Kampen, the Netherlands
- Height: 1.88 m (6 ft 2 in)
- Weight: 215 lb (98 kg)

Cycling career
- Sport: Cycling
- Current team: Redline Bicycles
- Discipline: Bicycle Motocross (BMX)
- Role: Racer
- Rider type: Off Road

Amateur team
- 1994–1999: GT Bicycles (Europe)

Professional teams
- 1999–2001: GT Bicycles (Europe)
- 2001–?: Giant Bicycles
- 2004–2006: Staats Bicycles
- 2006: Troy Lee Designs
- 2006–Present: Redline Bicycles/Troy Lee Designs
Medal record
Men's BMX racing
Representing Netherlands
World Cup
Gold medal – first place	2003	BMX racing
Gold medal – first place	2005	BMX racing
Gold medal – first place	2007	BMX racing

Robert de Wilde (born April 30, 1977, in Kampen) is a Dutch professional "Mid/Current School" Bicycle Motocross (BMX) racer whose prime competitive years were from 1990 to 2003. His nicknames are "The Flying Dutchman" in reference to his speed and his nationality and "Afro-Bob" because of his long wild, uncombed hair. He was chosen for the Dutch BMX Olympic team to participate in the 2008 Summer Olympics in Beijing, China where he reached the quarter-finals.

== Racing career milestones ==
Started Racing: 1982 at the age of five years. A friend got him into it.

Turned Professional: January 1999 at the age of 21. During 1999 and prior de Wilde was one of only three total pros Europe ever had (Dylan Clayton and Wilco Groenendaal were the other two) due to the nature of racing rules with the European sanctioning bodies at the time, which did not permit a full pro class in which an unlimited amount of money can be earned by the racer at a race.

Height & weight at height of his career (1999–2006): Ht:6'2" Wt:215 lbs.

*In the NBL it is "B"/Superclass/"A" pro (beginning with 2000 season), in Europe Superclass; in the ABA it is "A" pro.
**In the NBL it is "A" pro/All Pro/"AA" Pro/Elite men (all depending on the era); in Europe Elite Men; in the ABA it is "AA" pro.

=== Career factory and major bike shop sponsors ===
Note: This listing only denotes the racer's primary sponsors. At any given time a racer could have numerous co-sponsors. Primary sponsorships can be verified by BMX press coverage and sponsor's advertisements at the time in question. When possible exact dates are given.

==== Amateur/Junior Men ====
- GT (Gary Turner) Bicycles (European Division)/Chevy: January 1994 -October 2001. De Wilde would turn pro (at least in the US) with this sponsor.

==== Professional/Elite Men ====
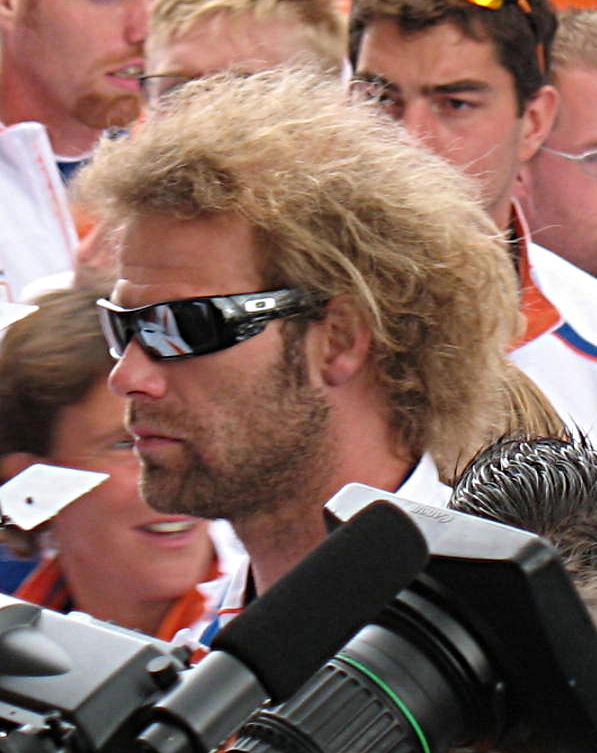
The famous "Afro".

- GT Bicycles(European Division)/Chevy: January 1994 – October 2001
- Giant Bicycles: Late December 2001– De Wilde's public debut on the new Giant team was the 2001 NBL Christmas Classic national on December 27, 2001.
- Staats Bicycles/Troy Lee Designs/Maxxis: January 2004 – June 27, 2006. De Wilde says in his blog he left Staats the Tuesday before the NBL Pittsburgh, Pennsylvania, nationals.
- Troy Lee Designs/Maxxis July 1, 2006 – October 3, 2006. Troy Lee Designs and Maxxis were his primary sponsors between Staats and Redline.
- Redline Bicycles/Troy Lee Designs/Maxxis: October 3, 2006–Present. De Wilde is under contract with Redline Bicycles (now owned by the Accell Group, a Dutch company) through 2008 and will race the 2008 Summer Olympics in Beijing, China sponsored by Redline.

=== Career bicycle motocross titles ===
Note: Listed are District, State/Provincial/Department, Regional, National, and International titles in italics. "Defunct" refers to the fact of that sanctioning body in question no longer existing at the start of the racer's career or at that stage of his/her career. Depending on point totals of individual racers, winners of Grand Nationals do not necessarily win National titles. Series and one off Championships are also listed in block.

==== Amateur/Junior Men ====
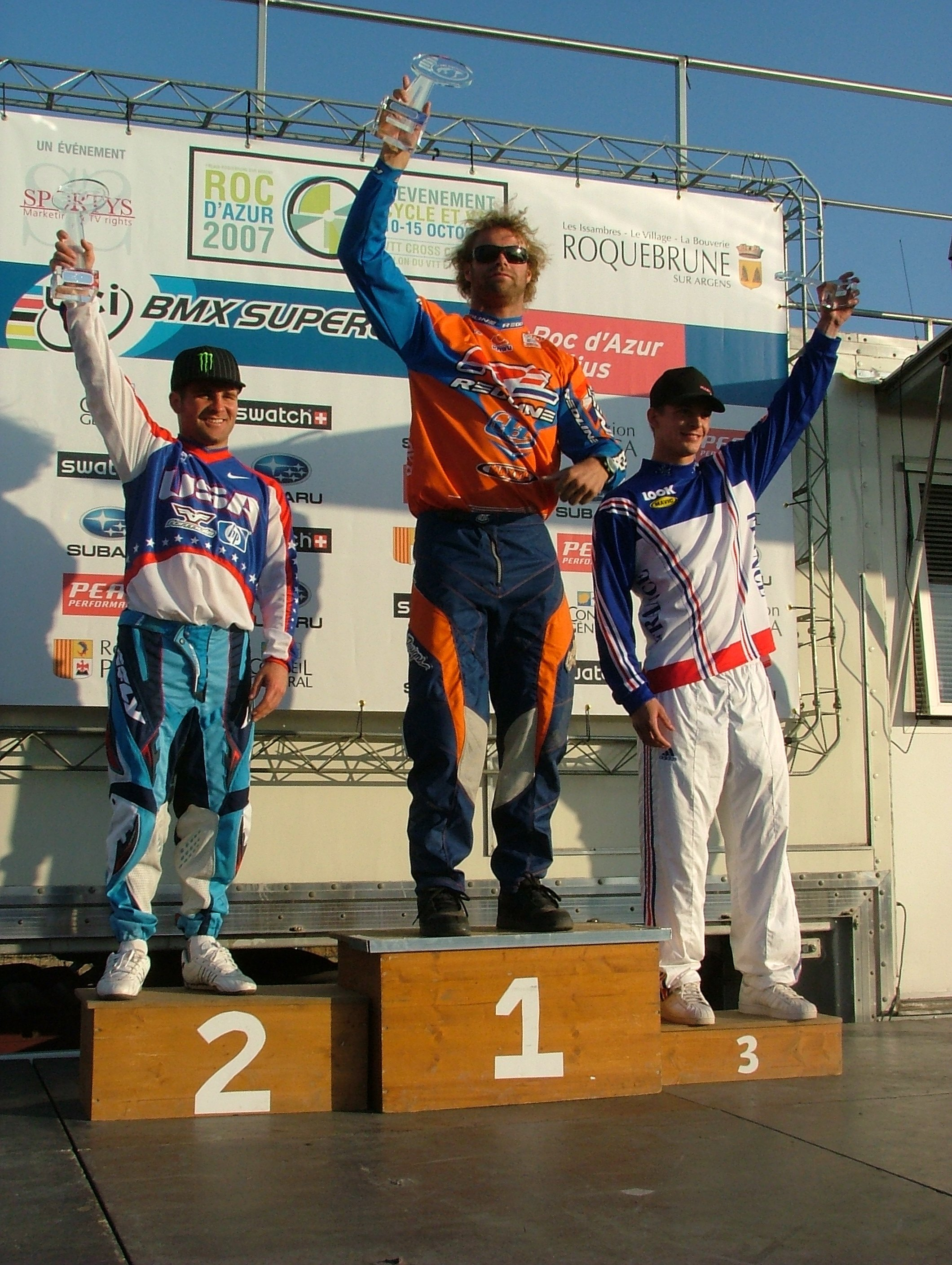
Robert de Wilde, winner of the Supercross World Cup 2007 in Fréjus on October 13th 2007

- 1990, '92, '93, '94, '95, '98 Dutch National champion.

American Bicycle Association (ABA)

- 1995, 1999 World Cup Champion

International Bicycle Motocross Federation (IBMXF)*

- 1993 16 boys World Champion
- 1994 17 Junior Bronze Medal World Champion

Union Cycliste Internationale (UCI)*

- 1995 Junior Men World Cup Champion

*See note in Professional section.

==== Professional/Elite Men ====
American Bicycle Association (ABA)

- 2001 "AA" Pro World Champion

Union Cycliste Internationale (UCI)*

- 1999 Elite Men World Champion
- 1999 Elite Men World Cup Champion
- 1999 Elite Men European Champion
- 2000 Elite Men European Champion
- 2005 Elite Men Supercross Champion
- 2005 Elite Men Pan Pacific Champion
- 2007 20" UCi Series Champion
- Note: Beginning in 1991 the IBMXF and FIAC, the amateur cycling arm of the UCI, had been holding joint World Championship events as a transitional phase in merging which began in earnest in 1993. Beginning with the 1996 season the IBMXF and FIAC completed the merger and both ceased to exist as independent entities being integrated into the UCI. Beginning with the 1996 World Championships held in Brighton, England, the UCI would officially hold and sanction BMX World Championships and with it inherited all precedents, records, streaks, etc. from both the IBMXF and FIAC.

International Olympic Committee (IOC)

Games of the XXIX Olympiad (2008 Summer Olympics)
Dutch National BMX Teammates: Rob van den Wildenberg, Raymon van der Biezen, Lieke Klaus.
Location: Beijing, China
Number of competitors: 32
Positions:
Event Results Wednesday August 20
Men's First Seeding Run‡: 36.803sec.
Men's Second Seeding Run: 50.268sec.
Seconds behind leader: +1.111 (23rd place).
Seeding Run leader: Mike Day United States
De Wilde advances to Quarterfinals†
Men's Quarter-finals (Overall after three motos of Run 3): 7th place; did not qualify for Semi-final*.
Event Results Thursday August 21
Postponed due to rain. Rescheduled.
Event Results Friday August 22
Men's Semi-finals*: DNQ
Men's Final (Medal Round): DNQ
Bronze medal winner: Donny Robinson United States
Silver medal winner: Mike Day United States
Gold medal winner:** Māris Štrombergs Latvia

DNQ= Did not qualify.
‡Time Trial data from nbcolympics.com
†Quarter-finals data from nbcolympics.com
*Semi-finals data from nbcolympics.com
**Final (Medal round) data from nbcolympics.com

=== Significant injuries ===
- Broke elbow at the UCI World Championships in Louisville, Kentucky, in July 2001. He crashed on the second jump in the first straight being laid up, he missed the X-Games as a result.
- Broke collar bone at the UCI World Championships in Sao Paulo, Brazil on the weekend of July 30, 2006

=== Racing traits and habits ===
- Doesn't comb or at least mat down his hair after he removes his helmet, resulting in a phenomenon called "helmet/hat hair" in which the hair on a person's head becomes either severely tousled or conversely molded into the shape of the headwear after wearing that headwear for an extended period of time. De Wilde's habit of not attending to hair care after removing his helmet and it being severely tousled as a result led to his moniker of "Afro Bob", a reference to the "Afro" style of "hairdo" that was popular with people of African descent, particularly during the 1970s (it has made something of a comeback in recent years).

== BMX press magazine interviews and articles ==
- "Robert de Wilde" Transworld BMX April 2003 Vol.10 Iss.4 No.78 pg.70

== BMX magazine covers ==
BMX World:

- August/September 2006 Vol.1 Iss.5 (77) ahead of Kyle Bennett (67) Jerrett Kolich (198) and Greg Romero (100)

== See also ==
- List of Dutch Olympic cyclists
