= Cycling at the 2010 Asian Games – Men's BMX racing =

Men's racing at the 2010 Asian Games
- Venue: Guangzhou Velodrome
- Date: 19 November 2010
- Competitors: 12 from 6 nations

Medalists
gold medal	Steven Wong	Hong Kong
silver medal	Akifumi Sakamoto	Japan
bronze medal	Masahiro Sampei	Japan

The men's BMX racing competition at the 2010 Asian Games in Guangzhou was held on 19 November at the Guangzhou Velodrome.

== Schedule ==
All times are China Standard Time (UTC+08:00)

Date	Time	Event
Friday, 19 November 2010	11:30	Qualifying
Friday, 19 November 2010	12:30	Final

== Results ==
Legend

- DNS — Did not start

=== Qualifying ===
==== Heat 1 ====
Rank	Athlete	Run 1		Run 2		Run 3		Total
Rank	Athlete	Time	Pts	Time	Pts	Time	Pts	Total
1	Steven Wong (HKG)	30.582	1	31.118	1	30.739	1	3
2	Masahiro Sampei (JPN)	32.052	2	31.699	2	32.427	3	7
3	Zhu Yan (CHN)	32.868	3	32.062	3	31.908	2	8
4	Ath Chaimayo (THA)	38.067	4	38.220	4	37.403	4	12
5	Jang Jae-youn (KOR)	39.535	5	38.839	5	40.337	5	15
6	Mohammed Al-Mabyuq (KSA)	DNS	8	DNS	8	DNS	8	24

==== Heat 2 ====
Rank	Athlete	Run 1		Run 2		Run 3		Total
Rank	Athlete	Time	Pts	Time	Pts	Time	Pts	Total
1	Akifumi Sakamoto (JPN)	34.307	1	31.790	1	32.382	1	3
2	Alex Hunter (HKG)	40.673	4	32.852	2	32.623	2	8
3	Zhao Zhiyang (CHN)	35.054	2	36.030	3	33.762	3	8
4	Narong Klinsurai (THA)	37.969	3	37.368	4	37.542	4	11
5	Suh Ik-joon (KOR)	41.989	5	44.336	5	41.251	5	15
6	Mahdi Al-Hassan (KSA)	DNS	8	DNS	8	DNS	8	24

=== Final ===
Rank	Athlete	Time
1st place, gold medalist(s)	Steven Wong (HKG)	30.337
2nd place, silver medalist(s)	Akifumi Sakamoto (JPN)	31.379
3rd place, bronze medalist(s)	Masahiro Sampei (JPN)	31.466
4	Zhu Yan (CHN)	32.467
5	Alex Hunter (HKG)	32.889
6	Zhao Zhiyang (CHN)	33.125
7	Ath Chaimayo (THA)	36.664
8	Narong Klinsurai (THA)	37.553
