= Thomas Allier =

French cyclist

Personal information
- Born: 24 March 1975 (age 51) Fontenay-aux-Roses, France
- Height: 1.85 m (6 ft 1 in)
- Weight: 190 lb (86 kg)

Cycling career
- Sport: Cycling
- Current team: Free Agent Bicycles
- Discipline: Bicycle Motocross (BMX)
- Role: Racer
- Rider type: Off Road

Amateur teams
- 1993-1997: Sunn/Chipie
- 1997-1998: Sunn/Nike

Professional teams
- 1998-1999: Sunn/Nike
- 1999-2001: GT Bicycles/Pansonic Shock Wave
- 2001-2003: Giant Bicycles
- 2003-2006: GT Bicycles
- 2006-Present: Free Agent Bicycles

Thomas Allier (born 24 March 1975 in Fontenay-aux-Roses, Hauts-de-Seine) is a French professional "Mid/Current School" Bicycle Motocross (BMX) racer whose prime competitive years were from 1993 to 2006. Allier was a member of the French Olympic BMX Team participating in the debut of BMX racing at the 2008 Summer Olympics in Beijing, China. Allier did not make it past the quarter finals.

== Racing career milestones ==
Note: Professional first are on the national level unless otherwise indicated.

Started Racing: September 1989 at 14 years old.

Sanctioning Body: UCI

First race result: Third place.

First win (local):

First sponsor:

First national win:

Turned Professional: 1998

First Professional race result:

First Professional win:

First Junior Pro* win:

First Senior Pro** race result:

First Senior Pro win:

Retired: Active

Height & weight at height of his career (1995–2006): Ht:6'1" Wt:188 lbs (1.85m, 85.5 kg).

*In the NBL it is B"/Superclass/"A" pro (beginning with 2000 season); in the ABA it is "A" pro.
**In the NBL it is "A" pro (Elite men); in the ABA it is "AA" pro.

=== Career factory and major bike shop sponsors ===
Note: This listing only denotes the racer's primary sponsors. At any given time a racer could have numerous ever-changing co-sponsors. Primary sponsorships can be verified by BMX press coverage and sponsor's advertisements at the time in question. When possible exact dates are given.

==== Amateur ====
- Sunn/Chipie: 1993 – September 1997
- Sunn/Nike: September 1997 – 1999 Allier would turn pro in the US with this sponsor.

==== Professional ====
- Sunn/Nike: September 1997 – 1999
- GT (Gary Turner) Bicycles/Pansonic Shock Wave: 1999 – October 2001. GT dropped its entire BMX and freestyle teams after Pacific Coast Cycles brought Schwinn/GT. Previously in October 1998 Schwinn Cycling & Fitness acquired GT Bicycles Inc. and merged.
- Giant Bicycles: Late December 2001 – late October 2003. In an odd repeat of his experience in 2001 with GT Bicycles, Giant Bicycles dropped its professional members of its team. Ironically, GT Bicycles which dropped its team two years before due to financial difficulties, picked him up for its European division after Allier moved back to France after the 2003 NBL season. and after the ABA Fall Nationals in Delmar, California on 26 October 2003.
- GT Bicycles: Late October 2003 – 11 December 2006
- Free Agent Bicycles: 12 December 2006 – present

=== Career bicycle motocross titles ===
Note: Listed are District, State/Provincial/Department, Regional, National, and International titles in italics. "Defunct" refers to the fact of that sanctioning body in question no longer existing at the start of the racer's career or at that stage of his/her career. Depending on point totals of individual racers, winners of Grand Nationals do not necessarily win National titles. Series and one off Championships are also listed in block.

==== Amateur ====
Association Francaise de Bicrossing (AFdB)

La Fédération Française de Bicrossing (FFB)

Fédération Française de Cyclisme (FFC)

- 1994 Junior Men French Champion.

National Bicycle Association (NBA)

- None (defunct)

National Bicycle League (NBL)

- None

American Bicycle Association (ABA)

- None

United States Bicycle Motocross Association (USBA)

- None (Defunct)

International Bicycle Motocross Federation (IBMXF)*

- 1991 16 Expert Bronze Medal World Champion
- 1994 18-24 Cruiser World Champion

Fédération Internationale Amateur de Cyclisme (FIAC)*

Union Cycliste Internationale (UCI)*

*See note in Professional section.

==== Professional ====
Association Francaise de Bicrossing (AFdB)

La Fédération Française de Bicrossing (FFB)

Fédération Française de Cyclisme (FFC)

- 1995-1998 Elite Men French Champion
- 2005 Elite Men French Champion

National Bicycle Association (NBA)

- None (defunct)

National Bicycle League (NBL)

- 2000 National No.1 Pro

American Bicycle Association (ABA)

- 2000, 2002 Pro World Cup Champion

United States Bicycle Motocross Association (USBA)

- None (defunct)

International Bicycle Motocross Federation (IBMXF)*

- None (defunct)

Fédération Internationale Amateur de Cyclisme (FIAC)*

- None (defunct)

Union Cycliste Internationale (UCI)*

- 1997 Elite Men Grand Prix BMX Valkenswaard Champion (World Cup Pre-Race)
- 1998 Elite Men European Elite/Junior Champion
- 1998, 1999 Gold medal Elite Cruiser World Champion
- 1998 Gold medal Elite Men European Champion
- 1998 Gold medal Elite Men World Champion
- 2000 Gold medal Elite Men World Champion
- 2004, 2005 Elite Men European Champion

*Note: Beginning in 1991 the IBMXF and FIAC, the amateur cycling arm of the UCI, had been holding joint World Championship events as a transitional phase in merging which began in earnest in 1993. Beginning with the 1996 season the IBMXF and FIAC completed the merger and both ceased to exist as independent entities being integrated into the UCI. Beginning with the 1996 World Championships held in Brighton, England the UCI would officially hold and sanction BMX World Championships and with it inherited all precedents, records, streaks, etc. from both the IBMXF and FIAC.

International Olympic Committee (IOC)

Games of the XXIX Olympiad (2008 Summer Olympics)
Discipline: Men's BMX
French BMX Teammates: Damien Godet, Anne-Caroline Chausson, Laëtitia Le Corguillé
Location: Laoshan BMX Field Beijing, China
Number of competitors: 32
Positions:
Event Results Wednesday August 20
Men's First Seeding Run‡: 37.176sec.
Men's Second Seeding Run: 36.649sec.
Seconds behind leader: +0.957 (19th place).
Seeding Run leader: Mike Day United States
Allier advances to Quarterfinals†
Men's Quarter-finals (Overall after three motos of Run 4): 6th place; did not qualify for Semi-final*.
Event Results Thursday August 21
Postponed due to rain.
Event Results Friday August 22
Men's Semi-finals:DNQ
Men's Final (Medal Round): DNQ
Bronze medal winner: Donny Robinson United States
Silver medal winner: Mike Day United States
Gold medal winner:** Māris Štrombergs Latvia

DNQ = Did not qualify.
‡Time Trial data from nbcolympics.com
†Quarter-finals data from nbcolympics.com
*Semi-finals data from nbcolympics.com
**Final (Medal round) data from nbcolympics.com

Allier's teammate on the Men's French team Damien Godet, the fourth member of the French team made the Men's Finals but came in last place with a DNF, Did Not Finish. His teammates the women's team Anne-Caroline Chausson and Laëtitia Le Corguillé won the first Gold and Silver medals respectively to be awarded in the Olympic Games for BMX.
Independent Invitationals and Pro Series Championships

=== Significant injuries ===
- Dislocated finger on left hand on 23 July 1998
- Broke hand at the 1999 ABA Super Nationals in Desoto, Texas on day 1 in the last pro main. Soon after while cross training on his mountain bike he slipped a pedal resulting in the chainring imbedding itself into his right leg, tearing muscle.
- Suffered a shoulder/collarbone separation at the UCI World Championships in Louisville, Kentucky on the weekend of 26 July 2001. He crashed on the first set of jumps in the first straight. He had to miss the 2001 X Games Downhill BMX race.

=== Miscellaneous ===
- Set the World Bunny Hoping record of 47" in 2001 at the BMX Plus! BMX Olympics, breaking Steve Veltman's previous record of 46" set in 1996. It still stands. He would later claim to have broken his own record unofficially by achieving a jump of 48" later in 2001. This is confirmed by some friends training with him : "Thomas could do some bunny hops at an insane altitude. As I was breaking at 95cm, I saw him succeeding several times at 120cm, making me feel I was crappy."
- He won the first Republic of China pro BMX race which was held in Taiyuan, China on Saturday 25 September 2004 (local time, east of the International Dateline). It was seen as either as a vehicle to have Taiyuan as an Olympic sports venue or to introduce BMX to China. It was seen in any case as a preparatory race for the 2008 Summer Olympics.

== BMX magazine covers ==
Note: Only magazines that were in publication at the time of the racer's career(s) are listed unless specifically noted.

Bicycle Motocross Action & Go:

- None

BMX Plus!:

Snap BMX Magazine & Transworld BMX:

- January 2000 Vol.7 Iss.1 No.39 (Snap)

Moto Mag:

ABA Action, American BMXer, BMXer (The official publication of the ABA under three names):

== BMX press magazine interviews and articles ==
- "The French Invasion" Snap BMX Magazine May 1999 Vol.6 Iss.3 No.31 pg.40 Joint interview with fellow countryman and racer Christophe Lévêque.
- "Thomas Allier: The One" Transworld BMX July 2001 Vol.8 Iss.6 No.57 pg.50
