= Ramiro Marino =

Argentine professional BMX cyclist

Personal information
- Full name: Ramiro Martín Marino Carlomagno
- Born: 16 November 1988 (age 37) Buenos Aires, Argentina
- Height: 1.75 m (5 ft 9 in)
- Weight: 68 kg (150 lb)

Cycling career
- Sport: Cycling
- Current team: Argentina
- Discipline: BMX racing
- Role: Rider
Medal record
Men's BMX racing
Representing Argentina
World Championships
| Bronze medal – third place | 2009 Adelaide | BMX racing |
Pan American Championships
| Silver medal – second place | 2014 Lima | BMX racing |
| Bronze medal – third place | 2015 Santiago | BMX racing |
| Bronze medal – third place | 2016 Santiago del Estero | BMX racing |
World Junior Championships
| Bronze medal – third place | 2006 São Paulo | BMX racing |

Ramiro Martín Marino Carlomagno (born 16 November 1988 in Buenos Aires) is an Argentine professional BMX racing cyclist. He represented his nation Argentina, as a 19-year-old junior, at the 2008 Summer Olympics, and later claimed the bronze medal in the men's elite category at the 2009 UCI BMX World Championships in Adelaide, Australia, finishing behind the American duo and Olympic medalists Mike Day and Donny Robinson.

Marino qualified for the Argentine squad in men's BMX cycling at the 2008 Summer Olympics in Beijing by receiving one of the nation's two available berths based on his top-ten performance from the UCI BMX World Rankings. After he grabbed a twenty-first seed on the morning prelims with a time of 36.768, Marino scored a total of 20 placing points to take the eighth spot in his quarterfinal heat, thus eliminating him from the tournament.
