= 2009 UCI BMX World Championships =

- Venue: Adelaide, Australia
- Date: 23–26 July 2009
- Stadium: Adelaide Showground
- Events: 8

The 2009 UCI BMX World Championships took place at the Adelaide Showground in Adelaide in Australia and crowned world champions in the cycling discipline of BMX racing.

== Medal summary ==
Event	Gold		Silver		Bronze	
Men's events
Elite men	Donny Robinson; United States	28.648	Mike Day; United States	29.544	Ramiro Marino; Argentina	29.774
Junior men	Sam Willoughby; Australia		Andre Fossa Aquiluz; Norway		Anthony Dean; Australia	
Elite men cruiser	Ivo van der Putten; Netherlands		Sander Bisseling; Netherlands		Vincent Pelluard; France	
Junior men cruiser	Joris Daudet; France		David Oquendo; Colombia		Renato Rezende; Brazil	
Women's events
Elite women	Sarah Walker; New Zealand	31.879	Eva Ailloud; France	32.991	Arielle Martin; United States	33.894
Junior women	Mariana Pajón; Colombia		Merle van Benthem; Netherlands		Maartje Hereijgers; Netherlands	
Elite women cruiser	Sarah Walker; New Zealand		Manon Valentino; France		Vilma Rimšaitė; Lithuania	
Junior women cruiser	Mariana Pajón; Colombia		Maartje Hereijgers; Netherlands		Ashley Verhagen; United States	

== Medal table ==
* Host nation (Australia)

Rank	Nation	Gold	Silver	Bronze	Total
1	Colombia (COL)	2	1	0	3
2	New Zealand (NZL)	2	0	0	2
3	Netherlands (NED)	1	3	1	5
4	France (FRA)	1	2	1	4
5	United States (USA)	1	1	2	4
6	Australia (AUS)*	1	0	1	2
7	Norway (NOR)	0	1	0	1
8	Argentina (ARG)	0	0	1	1
8	Brazil (BRA)	0	0	1	1
8	Lithuania (LTU)	0	0	1	1
Totals (10 entries)		8	8	8	24
