= Erwood (name) =

Erwood is both a given name and a surname, as well as being a place name. Notable people with this name include:

== Given name ==
- William Erwood Old Jr. (1928–1982), American malacologist

== Surname ==
- Francis Erwood (1824–1878), English racquet player
- Russel Erwood (born 1981), British jester, magician, and circus clown
- Scott Erwood (born 1987), Canadian BMX cyclist
- Marshall Erwood (born 2005), New Zealand track and road cyclist

== See also ==
- Erwood, a village in Powys, Wales
