= Matisons =

Matisons is a surname. Notable people with the surname include:

- Artūrs Matisons (born 1985), Latvian cyclist
- Hermanis Matisons (1894–1932), Latvian chess player
