= Venues of the 2008 Summer Olympics =

For the 2008 Summer Olympics in Beijing, a total of thirty-seven venues were used. Events took place at eleven pre-existing venues, twelve new venues constructed for the Olympics, and eight temporary venues that were removed following the games. In addition, six venues outside Beijing hosted events, two of which were newly built for the Olympics.

Beijing won its bid to host the 2008 Olympics on 13 July 2001. The first new venues to begin construction were the Beijing National Stadium, Beijing National Aquatics Center, Beijing Shooting Range Hall, and the Laoshan Velodrome, where major work commenced in December 2003. By May 2007, construction had begun at all of the Beijing venues for the games. Approximately RMB¥13 billion (US$1.9 billion) was spent to build and renovate the venues.

Several venues were located at the Olympic Green Olympic Park. The largest venue at the games in terms of seating capacity was the Beijing National Stadium, also known as the Bird's Nest, which had a capacity of 91,000 at the time and was the site for the opening and closing ceremonies. The smallest venue in terms of seating capacity was the temporary Laoshan Mountain Bike Course, which had a capacity of 2,000.

== Venues ==
=== Olympic Green ===
Venue	Sports	Capacity	Ref.
Olympic Green Tennis Center	Tennis	32,400	
Olympic Green Archery Field	Archery	5,000	
Olympic Green Convention Center	Fencing, Modern Pentathlon (fencing, shooting)	5,695	
Olympic Green Hockey Field	Field hockey	17,000	

=== Universities and gymnasiums ===
Venue	Sports	Capacity	Ref.
Beijing Science and Technology University Gymnasium	Judo, Taekwondo	8,024	
Beijing University of Technology Gymnasium	Badminton, Gymnastics (rhythmic)	7,500	
China Agricultural University Gymnasium	Wrestling	8,000	
Peking University Gymnasium	Table tennis	8,000	
Beihang University Gymnasium	Weightlifting	5,400	
Beijing Institute of Technology Gymnasium	Volleyball	5,000	

=== New competition venues ===
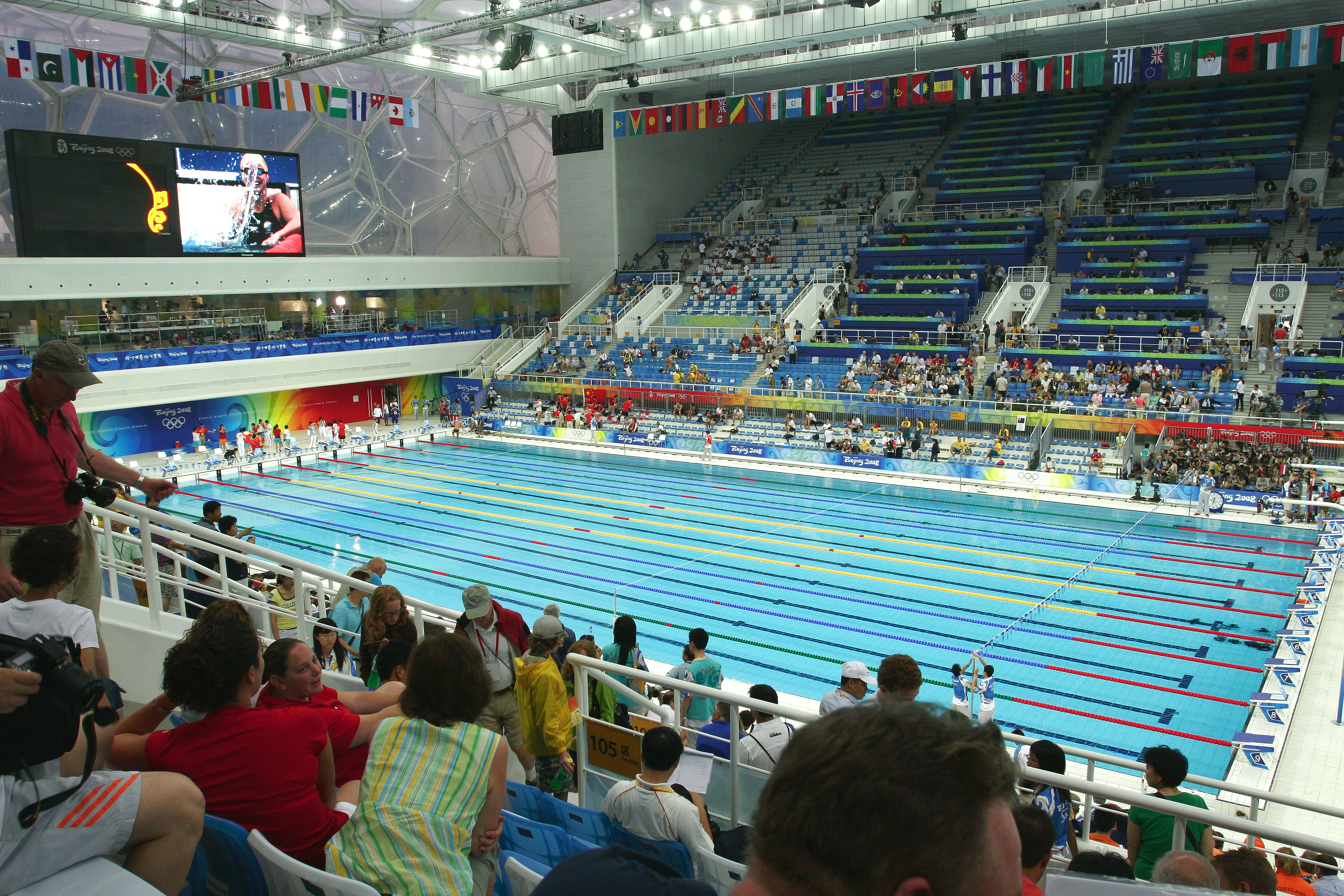
The Beijing National Aquatics Center at night

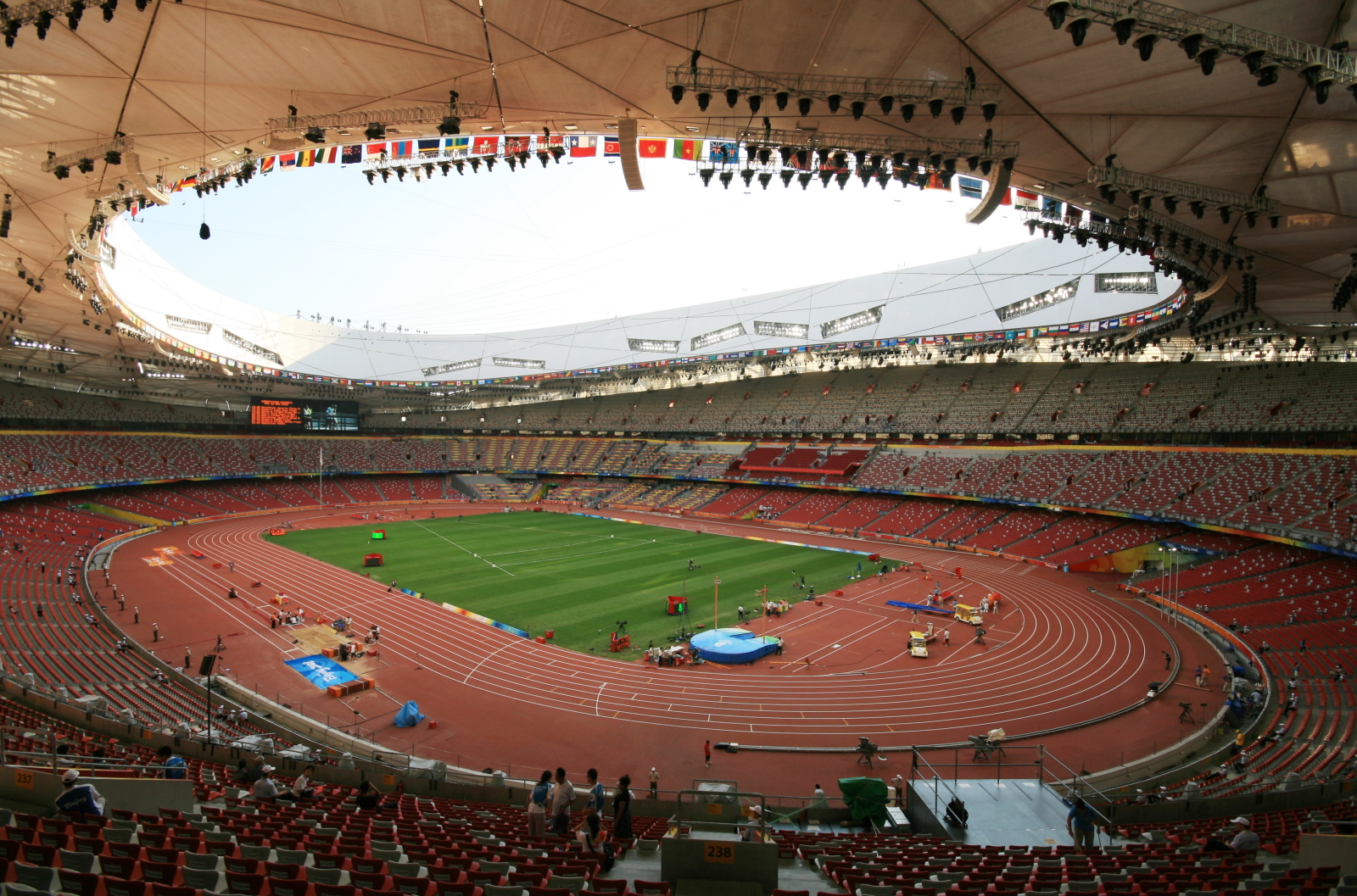
The Beijing National Stadium

Venue	Sports	Capacity	Ref.
Beijing National Aquatic Center	Swimming, Diving and Synchronized Swimming	17,000	
Beijing National Indoor Stadium	Gymnastics (artistic, trampoline), Handball (final)	19,000	
Beijing National Stadium	Athletics, Football (final), opening and closing ceremonies	91,000	
Beijing Science and Technology University Gymnasium	Judo, Taekwondo	8,024	
Beijing Shooting Range Hall	Shooting (pistol, rifle)	9,000	
Beijing University of Technology Gymnasium	Badminton, Gymnastics (rhythmic)	7,500	
China Agricultural University Gymnasium	Wrestling	8,000	
Laoshan Velodrome	Cycling (track)	6,000	
Olympic Green Tennis Center	Tennis	17,400	
Peking University Gymnasium	Table tennis	8,000	
Shunyi Olympic Rowing-Canoeing Park	Rowing, Canoeing, and Swimming (marathon)	37,000	
Wukesong Indoor Stadium	Basketball	18,000	

=== Existing competition venues ===
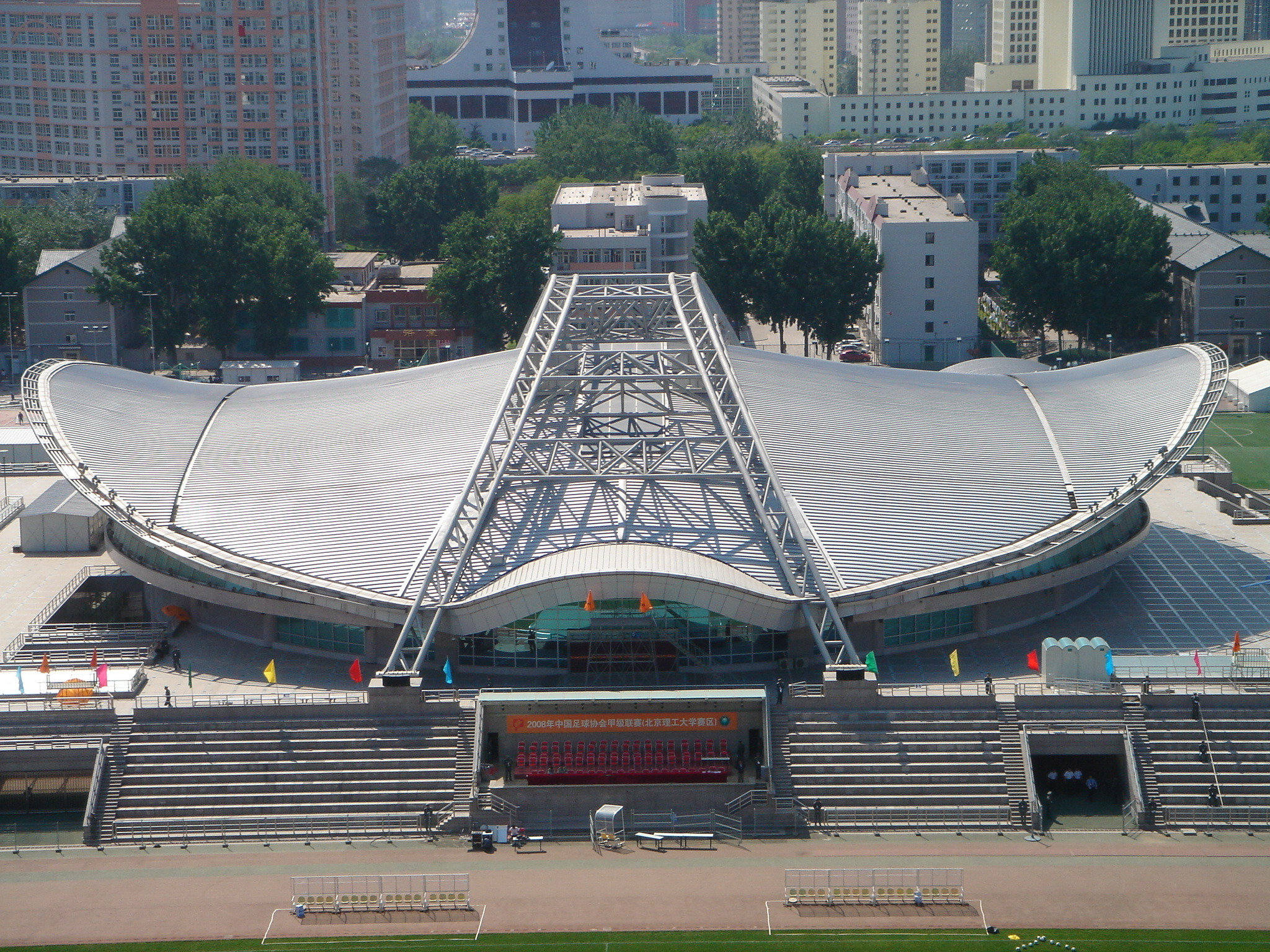
The Beijing Institute of Technology Gymnasium hosted the volleyball competition

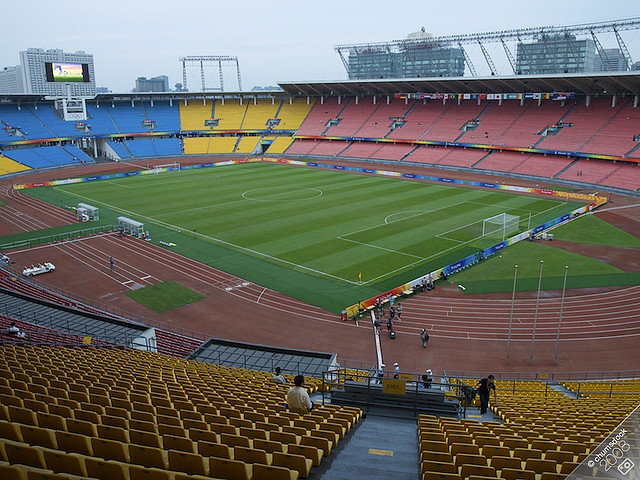
The Workers Stadium hosted the quarter-final and semi-final football matches

Venue	Sports	Capacity	Ref.
Beihang University Gymnasium	Weightlifting	5,400	
Beijing Institute of Technology Gymnasium	Volleyball	5,000	
Beijing Shooting Range Clay Target Field	Shooting (shotgun)	5,000	
Capital Indoor Stadium	Volleyball (final)	18,000	
Fengtai Softball Field	Softball	13,000	
Laoshan Mountain Bike Course	Cycling (Mountain Bike)	2,000	
Olympic Sports Centre	Football, Modern Pentathlon (riding, running)	36,228	
Olympic Sports Center Gymnasium	Handball	7,000	
Workers Indoor Arena	Boxing	13,000	
Workers Stadium	Football	70,161	
Ying Tung Natatorium	Water Polo, Modern Pentathlon (swimming)	4,852	

=== Temporary competition venues ===
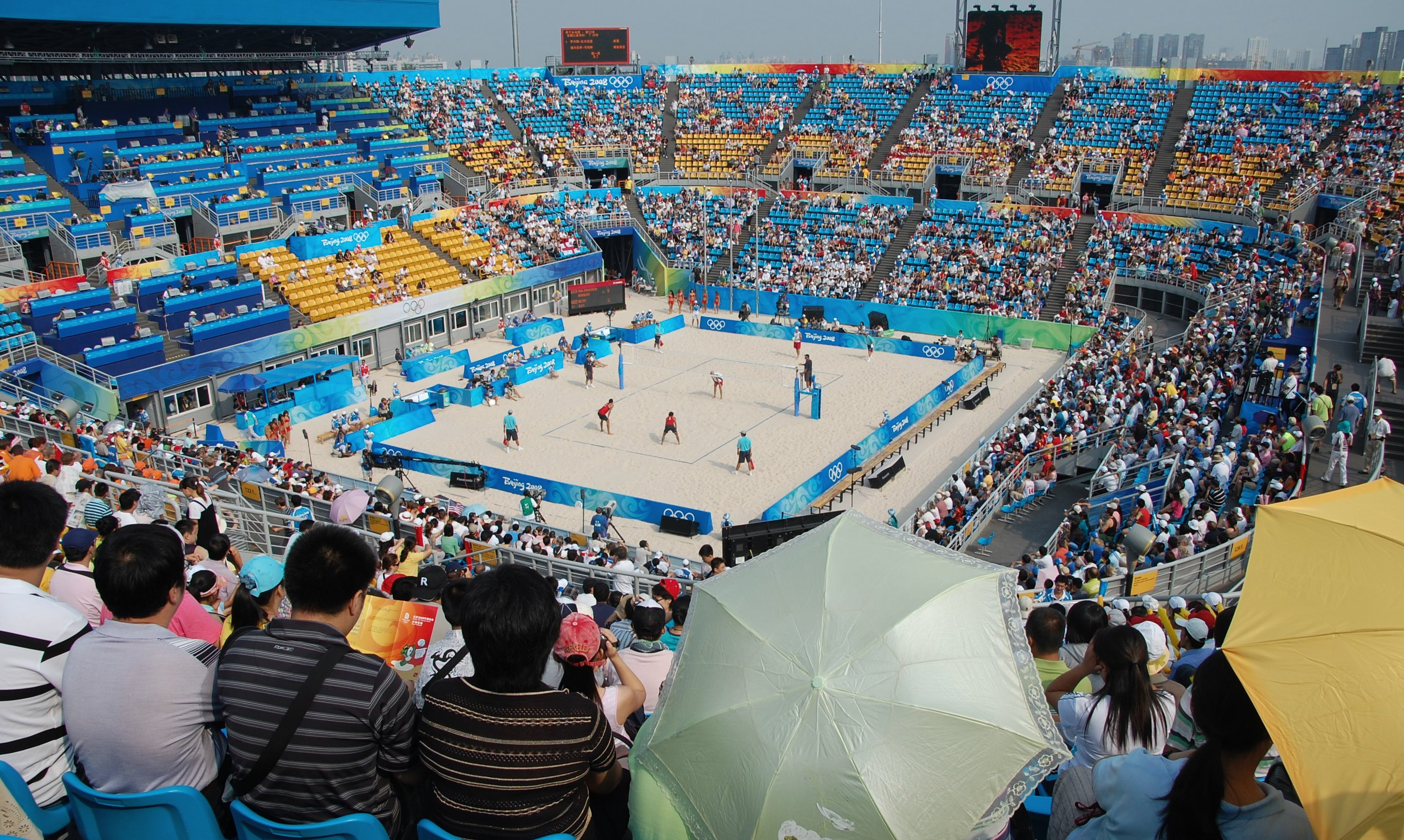
The Chaoyang Park Beach Volleyball Ground

Venue	Sports	Capacity	Ref.
Beach Volleyball Ground	Volleyball (beach)	12,000	
BMX Field	Cycling (BMX)	4,000	
Olympic Green Archery Field	Archery	5,000	
Olympic Green Convention Center	Fencing, Modern Pentathlon (fencing, shooting)	5,695	
Olympic Green Hockey Field	Field hockey	17,000	
Triathlon Venue	Triathlon	10,000	
Urban Road Cycling Course	Cycling (road race)	n/a^{[n 1]}	
Wukesong Baseball Field	Baseball	18,000	

=== Competition venues outside Beijing ===
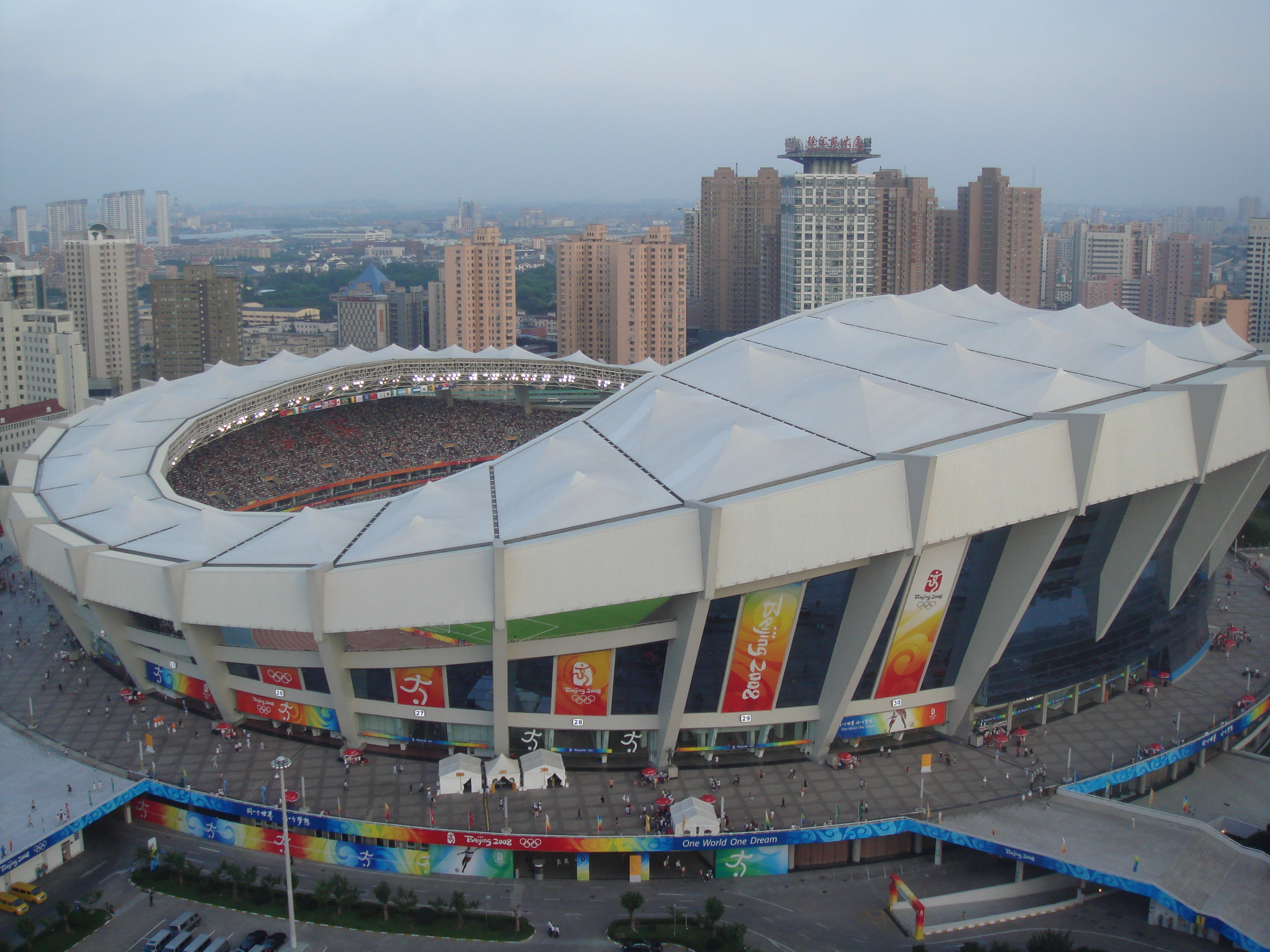
Shanghai Stadium, one of the venues for the football preliminaries

Venue	Location	Sports	Capacity	Ref.
Hong Kong Equestrian Venues	Hong Kong	Equestrian	18,000	
Qingdao International Sailing Center	Qingdao	Sailing	n/a^{[n 1]}	
Qinhuangdao Olympic Sports Center Stadium	Qinhuangdao	Football	33,572	
Shanghai Stadium	Shanghai	Football	80,000	
Shenyang Olympic Sports Center Stadium	Shenyang	Football	60,000	
Tianjin Olympic Center Stadium	Tianjin	Football	60,000	

== Notes ==
1. Both the Urban Road Cycling Course and the Qingdao International Sailing Center did not have spectator seating, and therefore no capacities are listed in this table. Spectators for events held at these venues could observe events held in them from regular pedestrian areas such as sidewalks.
