= Madill =

Madill can refer to:

Places:

- Madill, Oklahoma

People:

- Ellwood Madill (1915–1999), Canadian politician
- Frank Madill (Canadian politician) (1852–1895)
- Frank Madill (Australian politician) (born 1941), Tasmanian politician
- Henry J. Madill (1829–?), US Army colonel
- Jeff Madill (born 1965), Canadian ice hockey player
- Luke Madill (born 1980), Australian BMX cyclist
- Maureen Madill (born 1958), Irish golfer and broadcaster
- Mike Madill (born 1982), Canadian ice hockey player
