= Dylan Clayton =

British BMX rider (born 1974)

Dylan Clayton (born 6 July 1974) is a British BMX rider. He won the bronze medal at the 1998 world championships in Melbourne, with Frenchman Thomas Allier and American Andy Contes taking first and second place. He won 5 world championships in his career .
