= Vilmos Radasics =

Hungarian BMX racer

Personal information
- Nickname: "Willy"
- Born: October 25, 1983 (age 42) Sopron, Hungary
- Height: 180 cm (5 ft 11 in)
- Weight: 84 kg (185 lb)

Cycling career
- Sport: Cycling
- Discipline: BMX (bicycle motocross)
- Role: Racer
- Rider type: Off Road

Vilmos 'Willy' Radasics (born October 25, 1983, in Sopron) is a Hungarian Bicycle Motocross (BMX) racer. He took part in the UCI BMX World Championships 2008 in Taiyuan, China, represent his country.

Radasics competed for Hungary at the 2008 Summer Olympics in the Men's BMX event.

== History Results ==
- 8 times, National Champion, 3 times in elite category
- 6 times, the Sportsman of the Year
- 3 times, Austrian-Hungarian Champion

European Cup places:

- 2000. 5th place
- 2001. 3rd place
- 2002. 5th place
- 2003. 5th place

European Championship, finals:

- 2000. 7th place
- 2001. 3rd place, 4. place, 8. place
- 2003. 7th place in elite category
- 2006. 5th place in Sopron

World Championship:

- 1993. The Netherlands 33rd place
- 1999. France 17th place
- 2001. USA 21st place
- 2004. The Netherlands 33rd place
- 2005. France 33rd place
