= Henrik Baltzersen =

Danish olympic cyclist, born 1984

Personal information
- Born: 14 August 1984 (age 42) Bjerringbro, Denmark
- Height: 1.80 m (5 ft 11 in)
- Weight: 93 kg (205 lb)

Cycling career
- Sport: Cycling
- Discipline: Bicycle motocross (BMX)
- Role: Rider

Henrik Baltzersen (born 14 August 1984 in Bjerringbro) is a Danish amateur BMX cyclist. Having started his sporting career at the age of six and been admitted to the Danish national cycling team since 1999, Baltzersen has mounted top-eight finishes in BMX racing at the European Championships, and later represented his nation Denmark at the 2008 Summer Olympics.

Baltzersen qualified for the Danish squad in men's BMX cycling at the 2008 Summer Olympics in Beijing by receiving an invitational berth from the Union Cycliste Internationale (UCI) based on his best performance at the UCI World Championships in Victoria, British Columbia, Canada. After he grabbed a twenty-ninth seed on the morning prelims with a time of 37.635, Baltzersen scored a total of 16 placing points to mount a fifth spot in his quarterfinal heat, narrowly missing a spot for the semifinal rounds by two tokens.
