= 2008 UCI BMX World Championships =

- Venue: Taiyuan, Shanxi, China
- Date: May 29 – June 1, 2008
- Events: 8

The 2008 UCI BMX World Championships took place in Taiyuan in China and crowned world champions in the cycling discipline of BMX racing. Great Britain's Shanaze Reade won her second consecutive world championships in the elite women's category, whilst Latvian Māris Štrombergs won the elite men's category.

== Medal summary ==
event	Gold	Silver	Bronze
Men's events
Elite men	Māris Štrombergs; Latvia	~~Steve Cisar~~ - (doping); ~~United States~~	~~Sifiso Nhlapo~~; ~~South Africa~~
Elite men	Māris Štrombergs; Latvia	Sifiso Nhlapo; South Africa	?
Junior men	Sam Willoughby; Australia	Vincent Pelluard; France	Denzel Stein; United States
Elite men cruiser	Thomas Hamon; France	Manuel de Vecchi; Italy	Jonathan Suárez; Venezuela
Junior men cruiser	Joris Daudet; France	Vincent Pelluard; France	Jelle van Gorkom; Netherlands
Women's events
Elite women	Shanaze Reade; Great Britain	Anne-Caroline Chausson; France	Sarah Walker; New Zealand
Junior women	Manon Valentino; France	Lauren Reynolds; Australia	Rachel Bracken; Australia
Elite women cruiser	Magalie Pottier; France	Amélie Despeaux; France	Sarah Walker; New Zealand
Junior women cruiser	Mariana Pajón; Colombia	Manon Valentino; France	Eva Ailloud; France

== Medal table ==
* Host nation (China)

Rank	Nation	Gold	Silver	Bronze	Total
1	France (FRA)	4	5	1	10
2	Australia (AUS)	1	1	1	3
3	Colombia (COL)	1	0	0	1
3	Great Britain (GBR)	1	0	0	1
3	Latvia (LAT)	1	0	0	1
6	Italy (ITA)	0	1	0	1
6	South Africa (RSA)	0	1	0	1
8	New Zealand (NZL)	0	0	2	2
9	Netherlands (NED)	0	0	1	1
9	United States (USA)	0	0	1	1
9	Venezuela (VEN)	0	0	1	1
Totals (11 entries)		8	8	7	23
