= Vincent Pelluard =

French-born cyclist (born 1990)

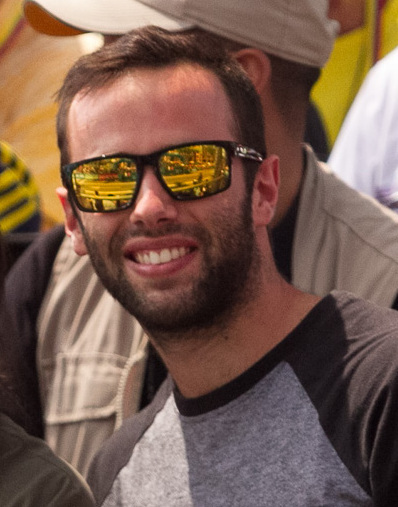
- Pelluard in 2018

Personal information
- Full name: Vincent Adrien Pelluard
- Born: 31 May 1990 (age 36) Joué-lès-Tours, France

Cycling career
- Sport: Cycling
- Current team: France; Colombia
- Discipline: BMX racing
- Role: Rider
Medal record
Representing France
Men's BMX racing
World Championships
Bronze medal – third place	2009 Adelaide	BMX cruiser
World Junior Championships
Silver medal – second place	2008 Taiyuan	BMX cruiser
Silver medal – second place	2008 Taiyuan	BMX racing

Vincent Adrien Pelluard (born 31 May 1990) is a French-born cyclist specialising in BMX racing. Pelluard was the French BMX Elite champion in 2013.

Following his marriage to Colombian BMX rider Mariana Pajón, he acquired Colombian citizenship and represented the country at the 2020 Summer Olympics.

== Personal life ==
In 2013, Pelluard started dating Colombian BMX racing rider Mariana Pajón. They married on 16 December 2017. In 2018, he acquired Colombian citizenship.
