= Donny Robinson (BMX racer) =

American Professional BMX racer

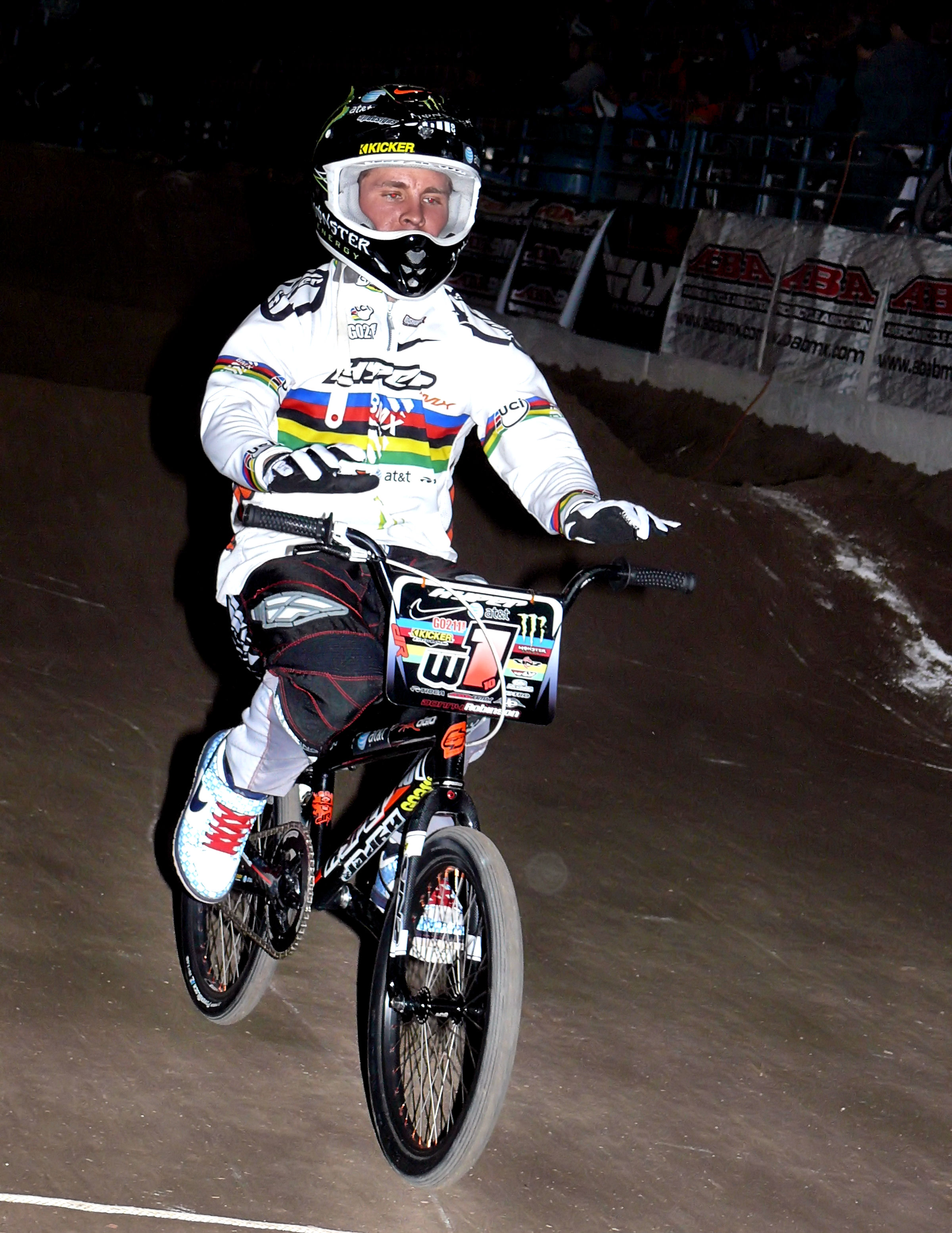
- Robinson in 2010

Personal information
- Full name: Donald Robinson
- Nicknames: "Scrawny", "dR"
- Born: June 17, 1983 (age 43) Napa, California, U.S.
- Height: 1.65 m (5 ft 5 in)
- Weight: 68 kg (150 lb)

Cycling career
- Sport: Cycling
- Current team: supercross
- Discipline: Bicycle Motocross (BMX)
- Role: Racer
- Rider type: Off Road

Amateur teams
- 1989-1991: USA Wheel Sports
- 1992-1994: CFC Racing
- 1994-1995: Hyper Bicycles
- 1995-2001: Powerlite Industries
- 2018-ongoing: DREAM TEAM

Professional teams
- 1995-2001: Powerlite Industries
- 2001-2002: Fly Racing/Staats Bicycles
- 2002-2004: Factory Phantom/Avent/Fly
- 2004: Avent/Bombshell/Fly Racing
- 2004-2005: Hyper Bicycles
- 2006-2007: Formula Bicycle Company
- 2008: Hewlett-Packard/AT&T
- 2008-: Hyper Bicycles
Medal record
Men's BMX racing
Representing United States
Olympic Games
Bronze medal – third place	2008 Beijing	BMX racing
World Cup
Gold medal – first place	2006	BMX racing
Gold medal – first place	2008	BMX racing
Silver medal – second place	2007	BMX racing
Bronze medal – third place	2009	BMX racing

Donald Robinson (born June 17, 1983, in Napa, California) is an American professional "New/Current School" Bicycle Motocross (BMX) racer whose prime competitive years are from 1999 to the present. His moniker is "dR", his initials. The use of the lowercase "d" for his given name is perhaps related to his relatively diminutive physical size. A past nickname, "Scrawny", was definitely linked to his small stature, since even when very young he was the smallest child in his age group. It was given to him by Bruce Minton. Like BMX predecessors Mike Miranda and Eric Rupe, Robinson is a devout Christian. He admitted in late 2013 to suffering at least 25 concussions over the course of his career. In the same interview, he advocated for better concussion protocol at the lower levels of BMX racing. Robinson joined the board of directors of concussion-education collaborative The Knockout Project in January 2013.

On June 25, 2008, Robinson was chosen by Mike King, team coach of the 2008 USA BMX Olympic Team, to represent the USA along with teammates Jill Kintner, Mike Day, and Kyle Bennett in BMX racing competition at the Beijing 2008 Summer Olympics. His Olympic dream was realized at least in part when he came in third at the Summer Olympics winning a Bronze Medal executing a maneuver that saw Sifiso Nhlapo take out nearly half the field. Since it was the sport's debut and the men's final was run after the women's, he became the third American and the sixth person overall to win an Olympic Medal in BMX Racing. Jill Kintner won the Bronze medal; Mike Day won the Silver medal. Kyle Bennett finished sixth in his semi-final and as a result did not qualify for the finals. Robinson announced his retirement of the sport at the 2016 USA BMX Grand Nationals.

== Racing career milestones ==
Note: Professional firsts are on the national level unless otherwise indicated.

Milestone	Event Details
Started Racing:	Age five at the Napa Valley BMX track in the summer of 1989 when a friend took him to the track.
Sanctioning Body:	American Bicycle Association (ABA)
First race bike:	U.S.Boss.
First race result:	First place.
First win (local):	See "First race result"
First sponsor:	USA Wheel Sports 1989.
First national win:	
Turned Professional:	December 2001 at age 18.
First Professional/Junior Men race result:	First Place in a local race at the Canadian Cycling Association (CCA) Abbotsford Indoor BMX Rrack in Abbotsford, British Columbia, Canada, on December 8, 2001.
First professional win:	See above.
First junior men/pro* race result:	See above.
First junior men/pro win:	See above.
First senior pro/elite men** race result:	
First senior pro/elite men win:	In "AA" pro on August 31, 2003, at the American Bicycle Association's (ABA) Blackjack nationals in Reno, Nevada.
Height & weight at height of his career:	Ht:5'5" Wt:150 lbs.
Retired:	Still active

*In the NBL "B" Pro/Super Class/"A" Pro/Junior Elite Men depending on the era; in the ABA it is "A" Pro.
**In the NBL it is "AA" Pro/Elite Men; in the ABA it is "AA" Pro.

=== Career factory and major bike shop sponsors ===
Note: This listing denotes only the racer's primary sponsors. At any given time a racer could have numerous ever-changing co-sponsors. Primary sponsorships can be verified by BMX press coverage and sponsors' advertisements at the time in question. When possible exact dates are given.

==== Amateur ====
- USA Wheel Sports: 1989-1991
- CFC Racing: 1992-December 1994
- Hyper Bicycles: December 1994-Late 1995
- Powerlite Industries: Late 1995-December 2001; Robinson turned pro with this sponsor.

==== Professional ====
- Powerlite Industries: Late 1995-December 2001
- Fly Racing/Staats Bicycles: December 2001-December 2002
- Factory Phantom/Avent Cycles/Fly Racing: December 2002 – 2004
- Avent/Bombshell/Fly Racing: 2004-2005
- Formula Bicycle Company/HP: February 2006-December 2007.
- Hewlett-Packard/AT&T: January 2008-March 23, 2008
- Hyper Bicycles: March 24, 2008 - February 8, 2013

=== Career bicycle motocross titles ===
Note: Listed are district, state/provincial/department, regional, national, and international titles in italics. Only sanctioning bodies that existed during the racer's career(s) are listed. Depending on point totals of individual racers, winners of Grand Nationals do not necessarily win national titles. Series and one-off championships are also listed in block.

==== Amateur/Junior Men ====
National Bicycle League (NBL)

- 1996 13 Expert NAG No. 1

American Bicycle Association (ABA)

- 1993 California District 4 (CA-04) No. 1
- 1994 11 Boys Northern California State Champion
- 1995 12 Expert World Cup Champion
- 1996 13 Expert National Age Group (NAG) No.1
- 1996 13 Expert Grandnational Champion
- 1997 14 Expert NAG No. 1
- 1998 15 Expert Race of Champions (ROC) Champion.
- 1998 15 Expert NAG No. 1
- 1999 16 Expert NAG No. 1
- 1999 16 Cruiser Grandnational Champion
- 2000 17 Expert and 17 Cruiser NAG No. 1
- 2001 18 Expert World Cup Champion
- 2001 18 Expert NAG No. 1

Fédération Internationale Amateur de Cyclisme (FIAC)*

- None

International Bicycle Motocross Federation (IBMXF)*

- None

Union Cycliste Internationale (UCI)*

- 2001 Junior Men & Junior Cruiser World Champion

*See Professional section.

USA Cycling

- None

Note: USA Cycling's BMX program did not exist prior to 2007.

==== Professional/Elite Men ====
National Bicycle League (NBL)

- 2005 National No.1 Pro Cruiser
- 2006 Elite Men Grand National Champion
- 2006 National No.1 Pro

American Bicycle Association (ABA)

- 2003 Pro Cruiser Grandnational Champion
- 2004 World Cup Pro Time-Trial Champion.
- 2006 National No. 1 Pro Cruiser

International Bicycle Motocross Federation (IBMXF)*

- None (defunct)

Fédération Internationale Amateur de Cyclisme (FIAC)*

- None (defunct. FIAC did not have a strictly professional division during its existence).

Union Cycliste Internationale (UCI)*

- 2006 UCI/NBL North American Champion
- 2006 Supercross World Cup Elite Men's Champion
- 2006 Elite Men's Cruiser World Champion
- 2008 Elite Men Supercross World Cup Champion
- 2009 Elite Men Gold Medal World Champion
- 2009 Elite Men Gold Medal Continental Series Champion

*Note: Beginning in 1991 the IBMXF and FIAC had been holding joint world championship events as a transitional phase in merging, which began in earnest in 1993. Beginning with the 1996 season, the IBMXF and FIAC completed the merger, and both ceased to exist as independent entities, being integrated into the UCI. Beginning with the 1997 world championships held in Brighton, England, the UCI would officially hold and sanction BMX World Championships and inherited all precedents, records, streaks, etc. from both the IBMXF and FIAC.

USA Cycling

- 2007 Elite Men National No. 1 Pro†
- On June 14, 2008 Robinson came in second at the Olympic trials at the Olympic Training Center in Chula Vista, California. Mike Day won the event with 35 points, winning two of the three runs of motos out of a scheduled four. This race format had seven racers participating in hopes of winning an automatic place on the USA BMX Olympic Team (Bubba Harris, who intended to compete, withdrew after breaking his right ankle in practice the previous Thursday). Robinson's 21 points from winning the second moto placed him in second but mathematically eliminated the possibility of overtaking Day in the winner-take-all format. As a result, the scheduled fourth moto was canceled, given concerns about racer safety (no need to endanger Day, given the potential of injury on the track, when other competitors had nothing to gain). However, Robinson was the top-ranked BMXer in the world and did well on the UCI and USA Cycling circuits, making him a much-speculated-upon choice for the fourth spot on the team, which was to be filled at the discretion of the team coach, Mike King. On June 25, 2008, that expectation was realized, and he was selected, joining Jill Kintner, Mike Day, and Kyle Bennett on the USA BMX Olympic Team.

†This is USA Cycling's inaugural national title award as a sanctioning body in the discipline of Bicycle Motocross. Robinson won the Elite Men's title on June 9, 2007, in Waterford Oaks, Michigan. Krystal Hime won for Elite women. This Championship was held under UCI rules and skill classifications as opposed to the UCI affiliated and USA Cycling owned NBL.

International Olympic Committee (IOC)

Games of the XXIX Olympiad (2008 Summer Olympics)
USA BMX Teammates Kyle Bennett, Mike Day, Jill Kintner

Donny Robinson
Medal record

Representing United States

Men's BMX

Olympic Games
Bronze medal – third place	2008 Beijing	Men's BMX

Discipline: Men's BMX
Location: Laoshan BMX Field Beijing, China
Number of competitors: 32
Positions:
Event Results Wednesday, August 20
Men's First Seeding Run‡:36.810sec
Men's Second Seeding Run: 36.868sec
Seconds behind leader: +1.118sec (24th place)
Seeding run leader: Mike Day United States
Robinson advances to quarter-finals†
Men's quarter-finals (Overall after three motos Run 1): Third place. Qualifies for semi-finals
Event Results Thursday, August 21
Postponed due to rain. Rescheduled.
Event Results Friday, August 22
Men's semi-finals (Overall after three motos Run 1*): Third place. Qualifies for finals.
Semi-final winner (Run 1): Mike Day United States
Men's final (Medal Round; one run of Main): Third place, Bronze Medal.
Silver Medal winner:** Mike Day United States
Gold Medal winner:** Māris Štrombergs Latvia

‡Time Trial data from nbcolympics.com
†quarter-finals data from nbcolympics.com
*semi-finals data from nbcolympics.com
**Final (Medal round) data from nbcolympics.com

Independent Pro Series Championships and Invitational Races

- 2006 International BMX Championships “Summer Festival”¥ Champion.

¥This race is a tribute to the memory of the late Mario Soto held every year in his home town of Bogotá, Colombia, and is called International BMX Championships “Summer Festival”. It is a professionals-only invitational race in which top pros are invited to participate. The first of these annual two-day events was held in 2003.

=== BMX product lines ===
- "dR" Signature Series FLY Racing "Powercurve" Handlebars (2002–2007)
- "dR" Signature Series Avent Complete bicycles (2004 & 2005)

=== Notable accolades ===
- In 1996 he was named as one of "The 10 Hottest Amateurs" and future top Pro BMXers by BMX Plus!
- He is a winner of the 2006 RideBMX Number One Rider Award (NORA)
- He won the 2006 BMXer Golden Crank Pro of the Year award.

=== Significant injuries ===
- Broke thumb at the 1997 ABA Fall Nationals (Day 1) in late October, 1997. He was laid up for approximately eight weeks.
- Crashed hard enough to bruise two ribs and split his helmet apart during his 15 Expert quarter-finals at the 1999 ABA Spring Nationals in Santa Clara, California.
- Partially separated ACL in his shoulder early in 2002.
- Dislocated his right wrist and broke his left thumb in April 2002 at the ABA U.S. Nationals in Tulare, California. Surgery was required to fix the ligaments in his wrist. He was laid up for six months. The first race after his return to the sport was the ABA Grandnational on November 30, 2002, in Tulsa, Oklahoma.

=== Racing traits and habits ===
- Robinson is aerophobic. Also his confidence is much greater when he is on the bike than off. He first spoke to his girlfriend when he was on his bike, admitting he never could if he did not have it with him.

== Post BMX career ==
Robinson officially retired from competitive BMX racing after the 2016 USA BMX Grand Nationals. He is still very active in the sport, promoting BMX racing, coaching, and developing grassroots BMX leagues.

=== Personal life ===
Robinson wed girlfriend Tiffany Lei Glenn in a ceremony in Napa, Calif., on November 14, 2009. In addition to BMX racing, Robinson has aspirations to be a Broadway theater actor/dancer/singer. He sang in his middle school choir. He went on "tour" with his now-wife performing at schools and fairgrounds.

== BMX and general press magazine interviews and articles ==
- "1993 District Number Ones" American BMXer October 1994 Vol.16 Iss.9 pg.51 One of many mini biographies of the ABA district champions of 1993.
- "The Fabulous Five" Snap BMX Magazine May 2001 Vol.8 Iss.5 No.55 pg.63 One of five short articles with five racers including Bubba Harris, Ian Stoffel, Brandon Nicholls, and Clint Gower.
- Donny Robinson" Transworld BMX November 2001 Vol.8 Iss.11 No.61 pg.71 A brief interview about doubling at the 2001 UCI World Championships in Men's Junior 20" and Cruiser.
- "Beijing Bound" The Napa Valley Register September 14, 2007
- "Small man, big plan: American Donny Robinson has eyes on BMX gold" Associated Press, USA Today December 25, 2007.

== BMX magazine covers ==
Note: Only magazines that were in publication at the time of the racer's career(s) are listed unless specifically noted.

Bicycle Motocross Action & Go:

- None

BMX Plus!:

Snap BMX Magazine & Transworld BMX:

Twenty BMX:

Moto Mag:

- None

BMX World:

Bicycles Today & BMX Today (The official NBL membership publication under two names):

ABA Action, American BMXer, BMXer (The official ABA membership publication under three names):
