= Cycling at the 2008 Summer Olympics =

Cycling at the Games of the XXIX Olympiad
- Venues: Laoshan BMX Field; Laoshan Mountain Bike Course; Urban Road Cycling Course; Laoshan Velodrome
- Date: 9 August – 23 August 2008
- Competitors: 508 from 66 nations

Cycling competitions at the Beijing 2008 Summer Olympics were held from August 9 to August 23 at the Laoshan Velodrome (track events), Laoshan Mountain Bike Course, Laoshan BMX Field and the Beijing Cycling Road Course.

The event was dominated by the Great Britain team, who claimed 14 medals in total, including eight golds, seven of them from the ten events in the velodrome. This marked the beginning of a period of complete domination for Great Britain that would last to the 2020 Summer Olympics; The British team would claim 21 of the 30 gold medals awarded in the velodrome over the next three Games, 70% of all gold medals on offer.

== Events ==
Eighteen sets of medals were awarded in four disciplines: track cycling, road cycling, mountain bike, and, new for 2008, BMX. The following events were contested:

=== Track cycling ===
- Team sprint men
- Sprint men
- Keirin men
- 4000 m Team pursuit men
- 4000 m Individual pursuit men
- Madison 50 km men
- Points race 40 km men
- Sprint women
- 3000 m Individual pursuit women
- Points race 25 km women

=== Road cycling ===
- Road bicycle race men—239 km
- Road time trial men—46.8 km
- Road bicycle race women—120 km
- Road time trial women—31.2 km

=== Mountain bike ===
- Mountain bike men
- Mountain bike women

=== BMX ===
- BMX race men
- BMX race women

== Medal table ==
Rank	Nation	Gold	Silver	Bronze	Total
1	Great Britain	8	4	2	14
2	France	2	3	1	6
3	Spain	2	1	1	4
4	United States	1	1	3	5
5	Switzerland	1	1	2	4
6	Germany	1	1	1	3
7	Argentina	1	0	0	1
7	Latvia	1	0	0	1
7	Netherlands	1	0	0	1
10	Sweden	0	2	0	2
11	New Zealand	0	1	1	2
12	Australia	0	1	0	1
12	Cuba	0	1	0	1
12	Denmark	0	1	0	1
12	Poland	0	1	0	1
16	Russia	0	0	3	3
17	China	0	0	1	1
17	Italy	0	0	1	1
17	Japan	0	0	1	1
17	Ukraine	0	0	1	1
Totals (20 entries)		18	18	18	54

== Road cycling ==
Games	Gold	Silver	Bronze
Men's road race	Samuel Sánchez; Spain	Fabian Cancellara; Switzerland	Alexandr Kolobnev; Russia
Men's time trial	Fabian Cancellara; Switzerland	Gustav Larsson; Sweden	Levi Leipheimer; United States
Women's road race	Nicole Cooke; Great Britain	Emma Johansson; Sweden	Tatiana Guderzo; Italy
Women's time trial	Kristin Armstrong; United States	Emma Pooley; Great Britain	Karin Thürig; Switzerland

== Track cycling ==
=== Men ===
Games	Gold	Silver	Bronze
Keirin	Chris Hoy; Great Britain	Ross Edgar; Great Britain	Kiyofumi Nagai; Japan
Madison	Argentina; Juan Esteban Curuchet; Walter Fernando Pérez	Spain; Joan Llaneras; Antonio Tauler	Russia; Mikhail Ignatiev; Alexei Markov
Points race	Joan Llaneras; Spain	Roger Kluge; Germany	Chris Newton; Great Britain
Individual pursuit	Bradley Wiggins; Great Britain	Hayden Roulston; New Zealand	Steven Burke; Great Britain
Team pursuit	Great Britain; Ed Clancy; Paul Manning; Geraint Thomas; Bradley Wiggins	Denmark; Alex Nicki Rasmussen; Michael Moerkoev; Casper Jørgensen; Jens-Erik Madsen; Michael Færk Christensen*	New Zealand; Sam Bewley; Jesse Sergent; Hayden Roulston; Marc Ryan; Westley Gough*
Individual sprint	Chris Hoy; Great Britain	Jason Kenny; Great Britain	Mickaël Bourgain; France
Team sprint	Great Britain; Jamie Staff; Jason Kenny; Chris Hoy	France; Grégory Baugé; Kévin Sireau; Arnaud Tournant	Germany; René Enders; Maximilian Levy; Stefan Nimke

=== Women ===
Games	Gold	Silver	Bronze
Points race	Marianne Vos; Netherlands	Yoanka González; Cuba	Leire Olaberría; Spain
Pursuit	Rebecca Romero; Great Britain	Wendy Houvenaghel; Great Britain	Lesya Kalytovska; Ukraine
Sprint	Victoria Pendleton; Great Britain	Anna Meares; Australia	Guo Shuang; China

* Participate in the preliminary round only.

== Mountain biking ==
Games	Gold	Silver	Bronze
Men's	Julien Absalon; France	Jean-Christophe Péraud; France	Nino Schurter; Switzerland
Women's	Sabine Spitz; Germany	Maja Włoszczowska; Poland	Irina Kalentieva; Russia

== BMX ==
Games	Gold	Silver	Bronze
Men's	Māris Štrombergs; Latvia	Mike Day; United States	Donny Robinson; United States
Women's	Anne-Caroline Chausson; France	Laëtitia Le Corguillé; France	Jill Kintner; United States

== Broken records ==
Event	Time	Name	Nation	Date	Record
Men's Sprint	9.815	Chris Hoy	Great Britain	2008-08-17	OR
Men's Individual pursuit	4:15.031	Bradley Wiggins	Great Britain	2008-08-15	OR
Men's Team pursuit	3:53.314	Bradley Wiggins; Paul Manning; Geraint Thomas; Ed Clancy	Great Britain	2008-08-18	OR
Women's Sprint	10.963	Victoria Pendleton	Great Britain	2008-08-17	OR

== See also ==
- Cycling at the 2008 Summer Paralympics
