= Akifumi Sakamoto =

Japanese BMX cyclist

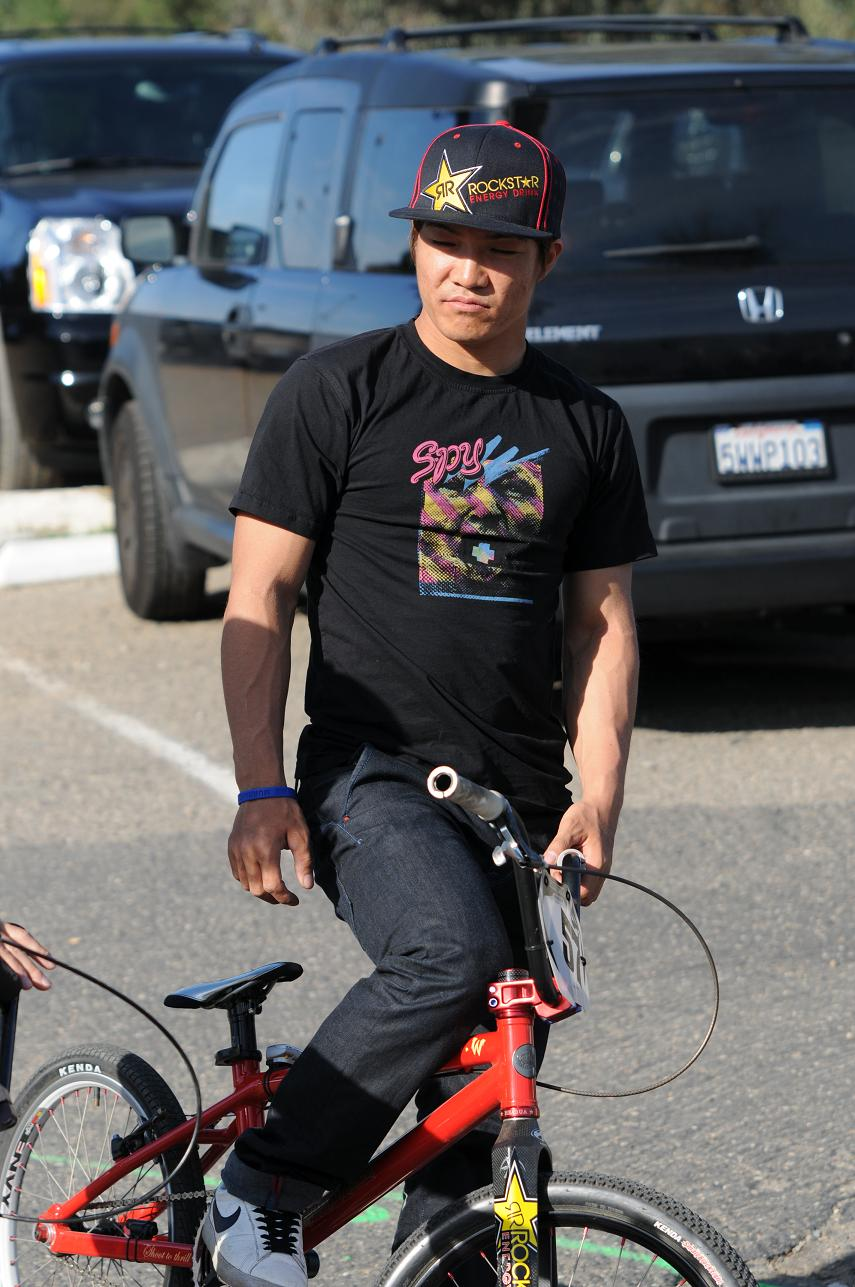

Personal information
- Full name: Akifumi Sakamoto
- Born: 25 February 1982 (age 44) Sakai, Osaka, Japan
- Height: 1.66 m (5 ft 5 in)
- Weight: 68 kg (150 lb)

Cycling career
- Sport: Cycling
- Discipline: Bicycle motocross (BMX)
- Role: Rider
Medal record
Men's BMX
Representing Japan
Asian Games
Silver medal – second place	2010 Guangzhou	Men's BMX

Akifumi Sakamoto (阪本 章史, Sakamoto Akifumi; born February 25, 1982) is a Japanese BMX cyclist. He represented his nation Japan at the 2008 Summer Olympics, and later claimed the silver medal in the inaugural men's BMX cycling at the 2010 Asian Games.

Sakamoto qualified for the Japanese squad, as the sole Asian rider, in men's BMX cycling at the 2008 Summer Olympics in Beijing by receiving an invitational berth from the Union Cycliste Internationale (UCI) based on his best performance at the UCI World Championships in Victoria, British Columbia, Canada. After he grabbed a thirty-second seed on the morning prelims with a slowest time of 40.548, Sakamoto scored a total of 19 placing points to mount a seventh spot in his quarterfinal heat, thus eliminating him from the tournament.

At the 2010 Asian Games in Guangzhou, China, Sakamoto held off his teammate Masahiro Sampei to take home the men's BMX silver medal in 31.379, trailing closely behind Hong Kong's Steven Wong by more than a full second.
