= Sebastian Kartfjord =

Norwegian cyclist

Personal information
- Born: 6 August 1987 (age 39) Bodø, Norway

Cycling career
- Sport: Cycling
- Discipline: BMX

Sebastian Kartfjord (born 6 August 1987) is a Norwegian cyclist. He was born in Bodø, but moved to Sandnes when he was five, and has represented the club Sandnes BMX. He competed at the 2008 Summer Olympics, in Men's BMX but did not qualify for the semifinals.
