= Jill Kintner =

American bicycle motocross rider (born 1981)

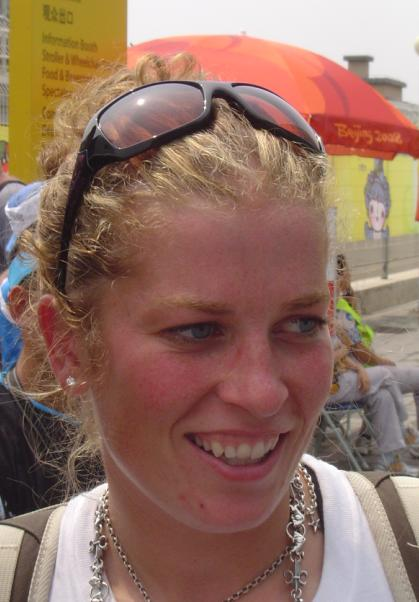
- At the 2008 Summer Olympic Games in Beijing, China.

Personal information
- Full name: Jill Kintner
- Born: October 24, 1981 (age 45) Burien, Washington, United States
- Height: 5 ft 7 in (1.70 m)
- Weight: 135 lb (61 kg)

Cycling career
- Sport: Cycling
- Current team: Norco Bicycles
- Disciplines: Bicycle motocross (BMX); Mountain bike racing (MTB)
- Role: Racer
- Rider type: BMX: Off road MTB: Downhill, four-cross

Professional teams
- 1999: Clayborne
- 2000: Team Burien
- 2000–2001: CC Racing
- 2002: Sharp Sprockets
- 2002: Intense/Troy Lee Designs
- 2002–2003: Staats Bicycles
- 2003–2005: Yeti Cycles
- 2006–2008: GT Bicycles
- 2010–2011: Transition Bike Co.
- 2012–present: Norco World Team/Norco Factory Team
Medal record
Women's BMX racing
Representing the United States
Olympic Games
| Bronze medal – third place | 2008 Beijing | BMX racing |

Jill Kintner (born October 24, 1981, from Burien, Washington, United States) is a professional American "Mid School" Bicycle Motocross (BMX) and professional mountain cross (four-cross or 4X) racer. Her competitive years were 1995 to 2002, 2007 to 2008 in BMX, 2004 to 2009 in mountain cross, and 2010 to present in downhill mountain biking. She switched to the mountain cross discipline full-time after her BMX retirement early in the 2004 season.).

== Biography ==
Kintner is from Burien, Washington. She began riding BMX in July 1989 at seven years of age and claimed her first national win in the combined 7–8 Girls Class at the American Bicycle Association (ABA) Great Northwest Nationals in Sumner, Washington, on August 17, 1990; it was her first national-level race. She won races at this event on both day 1 and day 2. At the age of nine in 1990, she received her first sponsorship from the Bike Factory, and turned professional in 1995 at 14 years of age.

She began riding BMX bikes during her childhood, as her father owned his own BMX track in Washington. She began competing professionally at age 14 and captured more than 70 BMX wins. In April 2004 she made the switch to full-time mountain bike racing competition. In 2006, Mike King, a former BMX and mountain bike racer, then director of BMX for USA Cycling, urged her to return to BMX riding, and in 2007 she did so, with the added prospect of possibly participating in the 2008 Summer Olympics

Jill came out of BMX retirement in early 2007, ostensibly to supplement her mountain cross training. She won her first post-comeback race on her first attempt. Despite a serious knee injury, Kintner continued to pursue success in BMX riding. With the objective of being included in the US BMX team for the 2008 Olympics, Kintner switched to BMX riding full-time. On June 2, 2008, she won a spot on the team after coming in sixth at the Union Cycliste Internationale (UCI) World Championships held in Taiyuan, China, out of a field of 32 racers, making the top 16. Kintner relocated to San Diego, California, in order to train at the Olympic Training Center, and won the bronze medal in BMX racing at the 2008 Olympics on August 19. Kintner stated it was highly unlikely that she would return for the 2012 Olympics.

=== Retirement ===
Kintner retired from BMX racing early in the 2004 season at age 22 to pursue a career in mountain-cross aka four-cross racing. She claimed she was "bored" with BMX riding and that she felt she had reached her "potential". She did, however, race BMX during the 2003 season and participated in the 2003 ABA Grand National, coming in fifth in the Pro Girls event. She continued to race BMX sporadically well into 2004, while slowly shifting her concentration to mountain-cross. Her last regular BMX race was possibly The NBL Gator Nationals in Avon Park, Florida, on April 4, 2004, where she finished second in the Elite Women event. Her last race pre-comeback seems to have been the ABA Silverdollar Nationals in Reno, Nevada, on January 8, 2005, in which she came in eighth. She had previously raced MTB cross country part-time since 1997.

== BMX career milestones ==
=== Career bicycle motocross titles ===
Note: Listed are District, State/Provincial/Department, Regional, National and International titles. The Junior Women division is for 17- to 18-year-old women, Elite Women for 19 and over regardless of amateur/professional status. Because of this, as an amateur would be racing professionals as well as other amateurs, Kintner's placing is listed below in the professional section, even if she was officially an amateur at the time of the race. Only sanctioning bodies that existed during the racer's career are listed.

==== Amateur/Junior Women ====
American Bicycle Association (ABA)

- 1990 8 Girls Gold Cup West Champion
- 1990 8 Girls Race of Champions Champion
- 1991 9 Girls US Open West Champion
- 1991 9 Girls Gold Cup West Champion
- 1991 Washington-1 (WA-01) Girls District No.1
- 1994 12 Girls Washington State Champion
- 1994 12 Girls US Open West Champion
- 1994 12 Girls Gold Cup West Champion
- 1995 14–16 Girls Cruiser Grandnational Champion
- 1996 Girls Cruiser Washington-1 (WA-01) District No. 1
- 1996 13 Girls Grandnational Champion

Union Cycliste Internationale (UCI)

- 1997 16 Girls World Challenge Champion
- 1998 Junior Women Bronze Medal World champion

==== Professional/Elite Women ====
National Bicycle League (NBL)

- 2002 Pro Girl National No. 1

American Bicycle Association (ABA)

- 2002 Pro Girls Race of Champions Champion
- 2002 Pro Girls World Champion
- 2002 Pro Girls National No.3

Union Cycliste Internationale (UCI)*

- At the World Championships held in Taiyuan, China, on June 2, 2008, Kintner came in sixth place, which guaranteed her the lone automatic women's spot on the US BMX Olympic Team.

USA Cycling

- 2008 Elite Women National Champion

Games of the XXIX Olympiad (2008 Summer Olympics)

- Bronze in Women's BMX at Laoshan BMX Field

Independent Pro Series Championships and Invitational Races

- 2003 RM59 Tropical BMX Challenge 16 & Over Money Open Champion

=== BMX Racing traits and habits ===
An aggressive rider in the Girl Pro class, she was disqualified for precipitating a collision with Kim Hayashi in the last turn of the Pro/Am 14 & Over Girl's Open at the NBL Christmas Classic in Columbus, Ohio, in December 2002.

== Mountain Bike career record ==
Kitner started racing mountain bikes part-time in 1997 alongside her BMX career. She raced full-time in 2003 at the age of 21, specializing in the 4X mountaincross discipline.

=== Career Mountain Bike Racing (MTB) titles ===
Note: Listed are regional, national and international titles.

==== Union Cycliste Internationale (UCI) ====
- 2003 Bronze Medal Women's 4-Cross World Champion
- 2004 Silver Medal Women's 4-Cross World Champion
- 2005, 2006, 2007 Gold Medal Women's 4-Cross World Champion
- 2007 Women's 4-Cross World Cup Champion

==== National Off Road Bicycle Association (NORBA) ====
- 2003, 2005 U.S. National Women's Mountain Cross Championships Champion

==== Independent Championship races and series ====
- 2005, 2006 Jeep King of the Mountain Women's Champion

=== Significant injuries ===
Kintner ruptured her anterior cruciate ligament in a December 2007 crash. She injured the same knee during a training crash in late April 2008. On May 4, 2008, she underwent surgery on her right knee to repair the meniscus. More major surgery was required to correct underlying problems, but she wore a leg brace and chose to delay the surgery until after the 2008 Summer Olympics. She eventually underwent the surgery on October 2, 2008.
