= Scott Erwood =

Canadian professional BMX cyclist

Personal information
- Full name: Scott Erwood
- Nickname: Big Easy
- Born: 20 October 1987 (age 38) Surrey, British Columbia, Canada
- Height: 1.78 m (5 ft 10 in)
- Weight: 79 kg (174 lb)

Cycling career
- Sport: Cycling
- Discipline: Bicycle motocross (BMX)
- Role: Rider

Professional team
- 2007–: Crupi Parts Inc.

Scott Erwood (born October 20, 1987, in Surrey, British Columbia) is a Canadian professional BMX cyclist. Having started BMX racing since the age of twelve, Erwood has claimed two Canadian national tournament titles each in both junior and elite categories, and has mounted a top-eight finish at the 2007 UCI World Championships in his home turf Victoria, British Columbia. While riding for numerous seasons on the Crupi World Factory Team, Erwood also represented his nation Canada at the 2008 Summer Olympics, following a race-off with his formidable rival Jim Brown from an Olympic selection camp in Chula Vista, California that nearly missed his lifetime opportunity to earn the ticket.

Erwood qualified for the Canadian squad, as the nation's lone rider, in men's BMX cycling at the 2008 Summer Olympics in Beijing by receiving an invitational berth from the Union Cycliste Internationale (UCI) based on his best performance at the UCI World Championships in Victoria, British Columbia, Canada, and by defeating his rival Jim Brown on a sudden-death race-off from an Olympic selection camp in Chula Vista, California. After he grabbed a twenty-sixth seed on the morning prelims with a time of 37.050, Erwood scored a total of 19 placing points to mount an eighth spot in his quarterfinal heat, thus eliminating him from the tournament.
