= Masahiro Sampei =

Japanese BMX cyclist

Masahiro Sampei (born 2 May 1990) is a Japanese BMX cyclist. He won the silver medal in the BMX Race of the 2014 Asian Games that was held at the Ganghwa Asiad BMX Track.
