= Kamakazi (BMX rider) =

Australian BMX cyclist (born 1981)

Personal information
- Born: Jamie Hildebrandt; 3 August 1981 (age 45) Brisbane, Australia
- Height: 1.65 m (5 ft 5 in)
- Weight: 84 kg (185 lb)

Cycling career
- Sport: Cycling
- Current team: Nerang BMX Club
- Discipline: BMX (bicycle motocross)

Major wins
- 0

Kamakazi (born Jamie Hildebrandt on 3 August 1981) is an Australian BMX cyclist who was selected to compete at the 2008 Summer Olympics in Beijing.

Kamakazi currently works as an apprentice boilermaker in addition to being a cyclist.
