= Ivo Lakučs =

Latvian cyclist

Personal information
- Born: 4 March 1979 (age 46); Valmiera, Latvia
- Height: 1.80 m (5 ft 11 in)
- Weight: 96 kg (212 lb)

Sport
- Country: Latvia
- Sport: Cycling

Ivo Lakučs (born 4 March 1979) is a Latvian cyclist. He has competed at two Summer Olympics – 2000 Summer Olympics in the track cycling and in 2008 Summer Olympics in the BMX. As of 2012, he is Māris Štrombergs' coach. Lakučs was born in Valmiera, Latvia.
