= Rob van den Wildenberg =

Dutch BMX racer (born 1982)

Rob van den Wildenberg (born 2 March 1982 in Valkenswaard) is a Dutch BMX racer.

Van den Wildenberg reached his first podium spot at a BMX World Cup meeting in the 2005/06 season when he won the bronze medal in Reutlingen. One season later he won a double silver medal in Kampen and in the 2007/08 season he won his second career bronze medal by finishing third in Echichens. He qualified himself for the 2008 Summer Olympics in Beijing.

== See also ==
- List of Dutch Olympic cyclists
