= Steven Wong =

Hong Kong BMX cyclist

Steven PMJ Wong
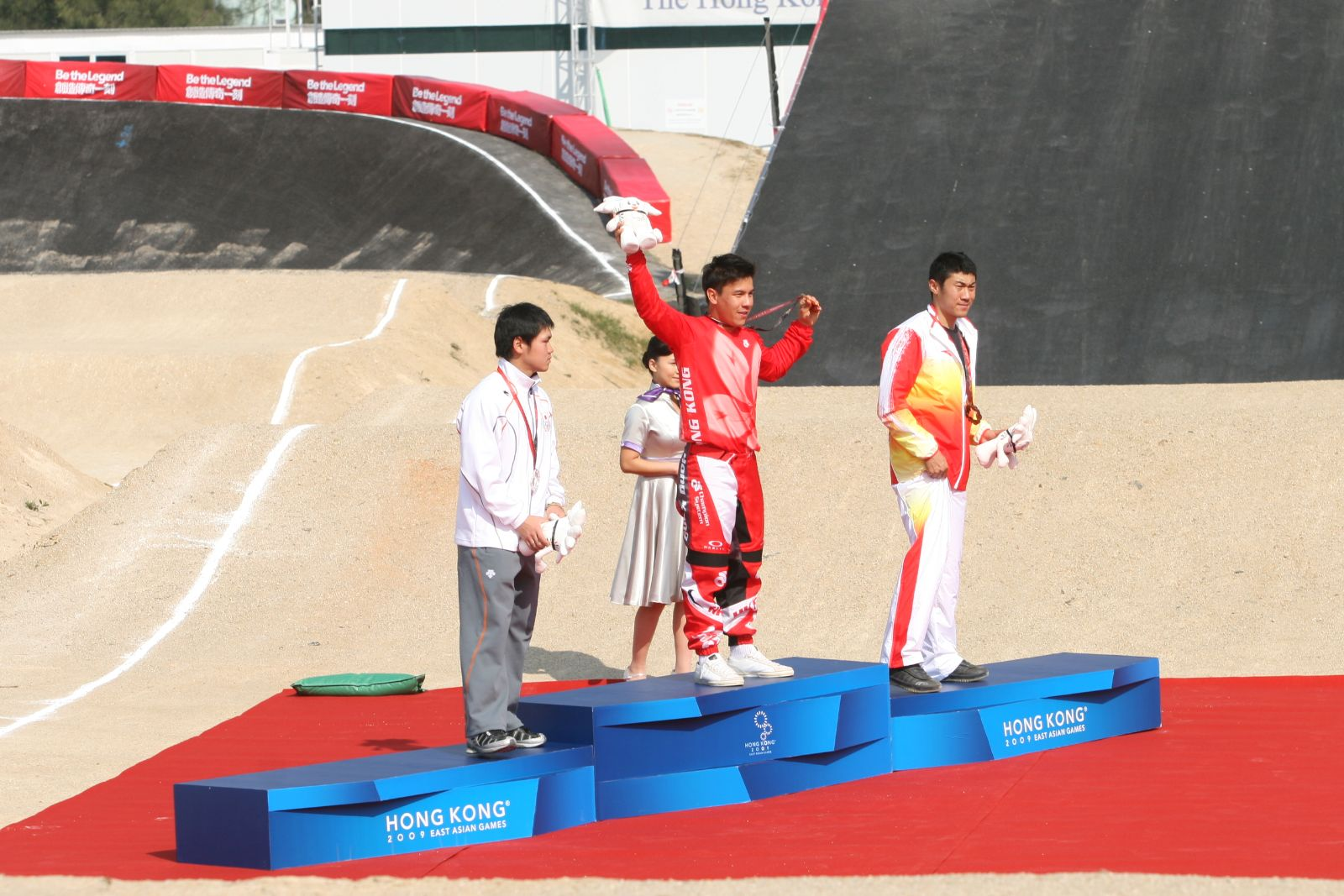

Personal information
- Born: 28 April 1988 (age 38) Dessel, Belgium
- Height: 1.66 m (5 ft 5 in)
- Weight: 64 kg (141 lb; 10.1 st)

Cycling career
- Sport: Cycling
- Disciplines: BMX; Road

Professional team
- 2011–2012: Champion System
Medal record
Representing Hong Kong
Men's BMX
2005 China National Games
Gold medal – first place	2005 Jiangsu	Men's BMX
East Asian Games
Gold medal – first place	2009 Hong Kong	Men's BMX
Asian Games
Gold medal – first place	2010 Guangzhou	Men's BMX

Steven Patrick Marie Josee Wong (Chinese: 王史提芬; Jyutping: wong^{4} si^{2} tai^{4} fan^{1}; born on 28 April 1988) is a BMX cyclist for Hong Kong.

Steven Wong was born to a Hong Kong Chinese father and Belgian mother. he has a little sister and grew up in Belgium. His father has a restaurant in Belgium. He was invited to race for Belgium but decided to race for Hong Kong instead.

He first raced for Hong Kong at the 2005 China National Games and won the gold medal in BMX cycling.

In 2009, he fell at the 2009 China National Games and failed to defend his gold medal.

Then in December 2009 he won the gold medal at the East Asian Games. In November 2010 he won the gold medal at the Asian Games in Guangzhou.

== Doping ==
Wong tested positive for Exogenous Steroids in an out-of-competition test 10 April 2012, and was handed a two-year suspension for doping. Wong claimed that his positive test was due to a skin cream.
