= Manuel de Vecchi =

Italian cyclist

Personal information
- Full name: Manuel de Vecchi
- Nickname: Jet
- Born: 8 October 1980 (age 46) Lavagno, Italy
- Height: 1.82 m (6 ft 0 in)
- Weight: 87 kg (192 lb)

Cycling career
- Sport: Cycling
- Discipline: BMX
- Role: Rider

Manuel de Vecchi is an Italian racing cyclist who represents Italy in BMX. He has been selected to represent Italy at the 2008 and 2012 Summer Olympics in the men's BMX event.
