= Artūrs Matisons =

Latvian BMX racer

Personal information
- Born: 6 May 1985 (age 40) Valmiera, Latvia
- Height: 1.80 m (5 ft 11 in)
- Weight: 85 kg (187 lb)

Sport
- Country: Latvia
- Sport: Cycling
- Event: Men's BMX

Artūrs Matisons (born 6 May 1985 in Valmiera) is a Latvian cyclist. He has competed at the 2008 Summer Olympics in Beijing, specialized in BMX cycling.

== Career bicycle motocross titles ==
=== Amateur/Junior Men ===
- "2002 European Junior Elite Champion"

Union Cycliste Internationale (UCI)*

- "2003 Junior Elite Men Gold Medal World Champion"
- "2003 Junior Elite Cruiser Men Gold Medal World Champion"

=== Professional/Elite Men ===
- "2007 Elite World #4"
- "2006 European Elite Champion"

Union Cycliste Internationale (UCI)*

- "2004 Elite World #14"
- "2003 Junior Elite Cruiser Men Gold Medal World Champion"
