= Luke Madill =

Australian BMX cyclist (born 1980)

Personal information
- Born: 28 May 1980 (age 46) Sydney, Australia
- Height: 1.76 m (5 ft 9 in)
- Weight: 78 kg (172 lb)

Cycling career
- Sport: Cycling
- Current team: Penrith Panthers BMX Club
- Disciplines: Bicycle Motocross (BMX) and 4X

Luke Madill (born 28 May 1980 in Sydney) is an Australian BMX cyclist who was selected to compete at the 2008 Summer Olympics in Beijing. As preparation for the Olympics, Madill built a replica of the Beijing BMX course on his property at Cranebrook in western Sydney. Madill often goes by the nickname "Dr Smooth", due to his speed and smoothness in all aspects of racing. Madill attended the primary school Samuel Terry Public School.
