= Māris Štrombergs =

Latvian bicycle motocross racer

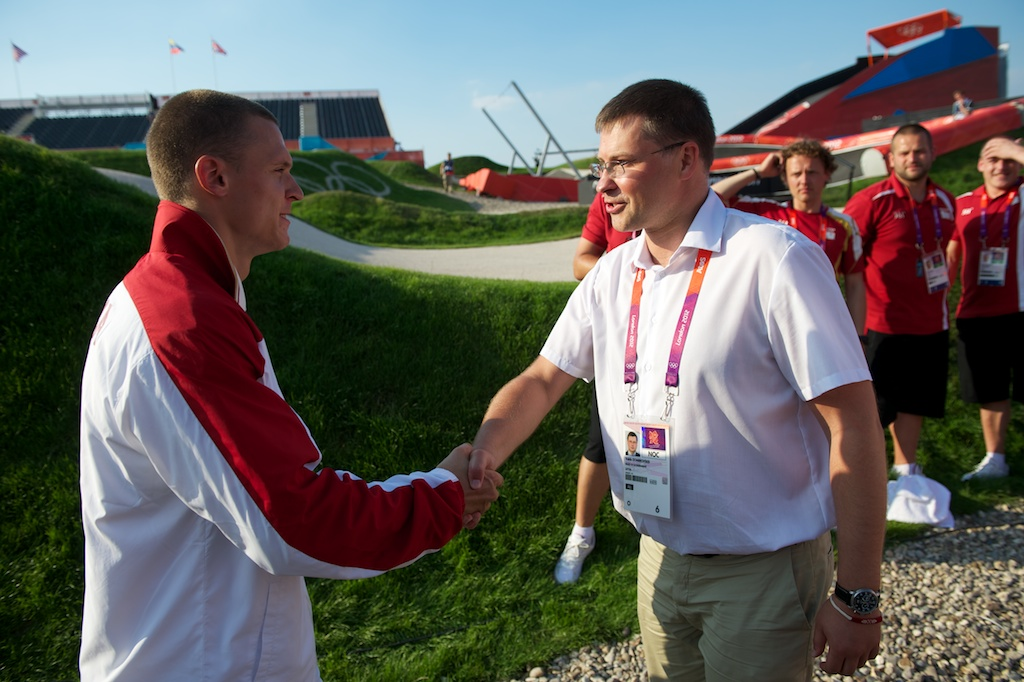
- Štrombergs (left) during the 2012 Olympic Games

Personal information
- Nicknames: Štrombis (Shtrombis), The "Machine"
- Born: 10 March 1987 (age 39) Valmiera, Latvian SSR, Soviet Union
- Height: 1.86 m (6 ft 1 in)
- Weight: 90 kg (198 lb; 14 st 2 lb)

Cycling career
- Sport: Cycling
- Current team: Tālava, Latvian Olympic Team, Free Agent Bicycles World Team & Rockst★r, Supercross BMX
- Discipline: Bicycle motocross (BMX racing)
- Role: Rider
- Rider type: BMX

Professional teams
- One
- Kenda
- Free Agent Bicycles
- Supercross BMX

Major wins
- 2 time Olympic Gold Medalist
Medal record
Men's BMX racing
Representing Latvia
Olympic Games
Gold medal – first place	2008 Beijing	BMX racing
Gold medal – first place	2012 London	BMX racing
World Championships
Gold medal – first place	2008 Taiyuan	BMX racing
Gold medal – first place	2010 Pietermaritzburg	BMX racing
Silver medal – second place	2011 Copenhagen	BMX racing
World Cup
Gold medal – first place	2010	BMX racing
Bronze medal – third place	2016	BMX racing
European Championships
Gold medal – first place	2008	BMX racing
Gold medal – first place	2013	BMX racing
Gold medal – first place	2014	BMX racing
Bronze medal – third place	2007	BMX racing

Māris Štrombergs (born 10 March 1987) is a Latvian former professional BMX racer. In the 2008 Summer Olympics he became the first Olympic champion in BMX cycling. Earlier that year he won the 2008 UCI BMX World Championships. In 2012 he added to his Olympic title by winning the gold medal in the London Olympics.

Štrombergs was born in Valmiera. His first trainer was Raimonds Ciesnieks. However, the longest collaboration was with Ivo Lakučs. Māris Štrombergs completed the Olympic 2008 BMX in about 36 seconds. Māris completed the Olympic 2012 BMX course in 37.576 seconds. Upon returning from the 2012 Olympics he was greeted by thousands of fans in his hometown Valmiera.

On November 13, 2018 Māris Štrombergs announced his retirement.

== Career bicycle motocross titles ==
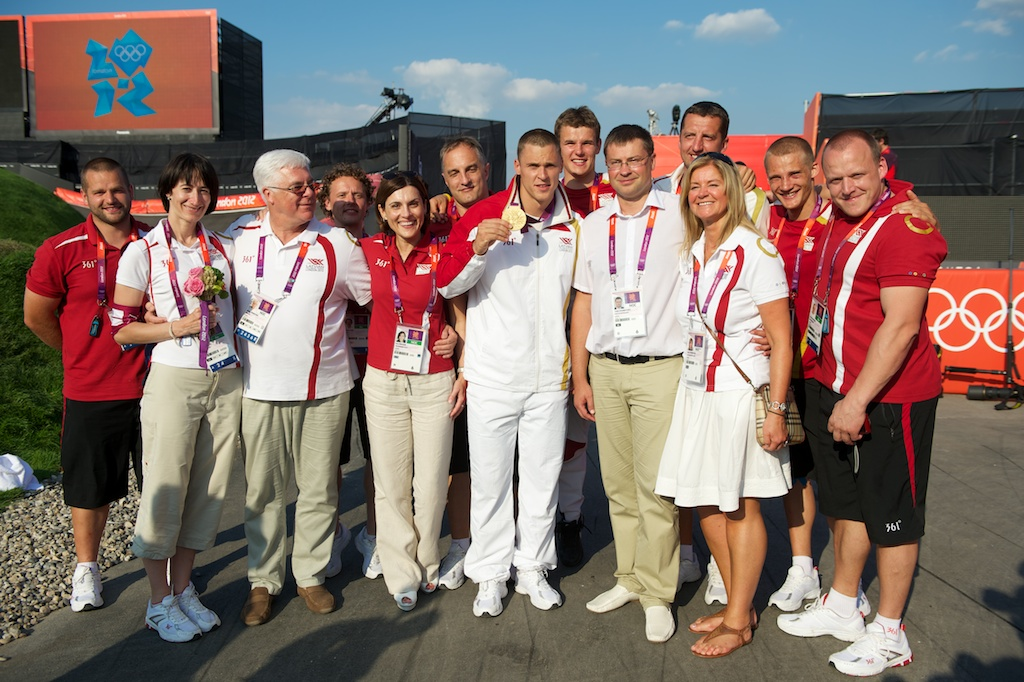
Štrombergs meeting with Latvian Prime Minister Valdis Dombrovskis and members of the Latvian NOC during the 2012 Olympics

=== Amateur/junior men ===
- "2001 The European youth challenge (European Challenge) Champion"
- "2005 European Junior Champion."

National Bicycle League (NBL)

- None

American Bicycle Association (ABA)

- None

Fédération Internationale Amateur de Cyclisme (FIAC)*

International Bicycle Motocross Federation (IBMXF)*

Union Cycliste Internationale (UCI)*

- "1996 (Worlds Challenge Class), World Champion of nine years in boys' group"

=== Professional/elite men ===
National Bicycle League (NBL)

- "2009 Elite Men ("AA") Pro Nat.#1"
- "2010 Elite Men ("AA") Grand National Champion Nat.#1 Pro"

American Bicycle Association (ABA)

- "2009 Vice-champion"
- "2014 Pro Nat.#1 Men (AA)"

International Bicycle Motocross Federation (IBMXF)*

- None (defunct)

Fédération Internationale Amateur de Cyclisme (FIAC)*

- None (defunct. FIAC did not have a strictly professional division during its existence).

Union Cycliste Internationale (UCI)*

- "2008 Elite Men Gold Medal World Champion"
- "2010 Elite Men Gold Medal World Champion"
- "2011 Elite Men Silver Medal World Champion"

Awards
Preceded by Viktors Ščerbatihs; Martins Dukurs	Latvian Sportspersman of the Year; 2008; 2012	Succeeded by Jānis Miņins; Martins Dukurs
Olympic Games
Preceded by Mārtiņš Pļaviņš	Flagbearer for Latvia; Rio de Janeiro 2016	Succeeded by Jeļena Ostapenko & Agnis Čavars
