= Laoshan Bicycle Moto Cross (BMX) Venue =

Temporary Olympic cycling venue in Beijing, China

Coordinates: 39°54′49″N 116°13′2″E

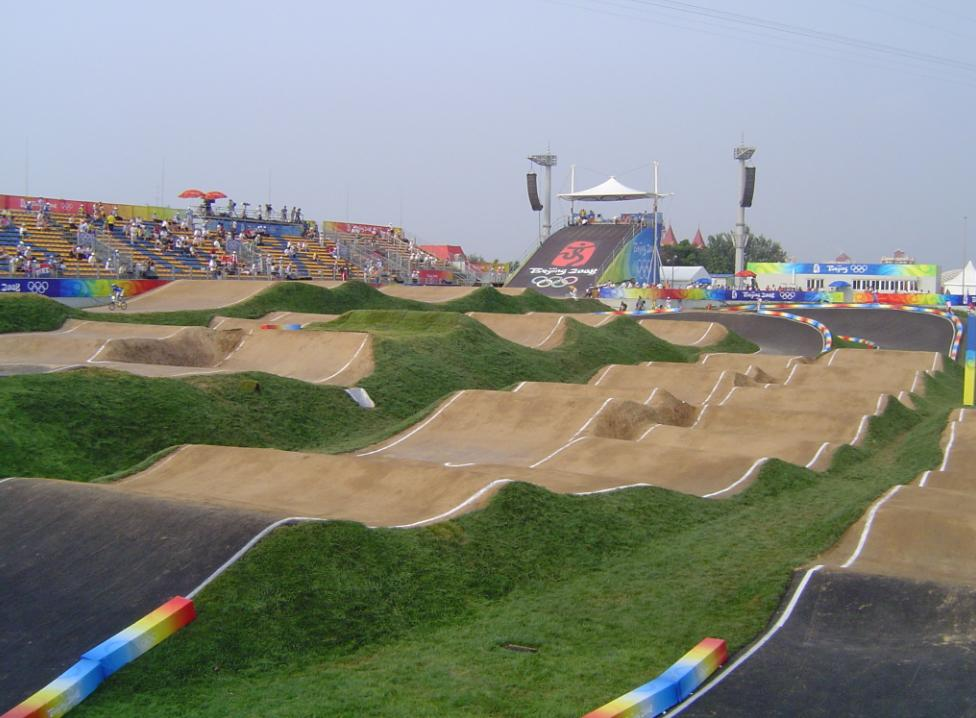
The Bicycle Moto Cross Field at Laoshan.

The Laoshan Bicycle Moto Cross (BMX) (simplified Chinese: 老山小轮车赛场; traditional Chinese: 老山小輪車賽場; pinyin: Lǎoshān Xiǎolúnchē Sàichǎng) was one of 9 temporary venues used for the 2008 Summer Olympics. It was located in Laoshan, Shijingshan District, Beijing. The venue was used for the men's and women's BMX racing events. The arena has in recent years been transformed into decay.
