= Sifiso Nhlapo =

South African cyclist

Personal information
- Born: 13 May 1987 (age 39) Soweto, South Africa
- Height: 1.78 m (5 ft 10 in)
- Weight: 88 kg (194 lb)

Cycling career
- Sport: Cycling
- Discipline: BMX (bicycle motocross)
- Role: Rider

Sifiso Nhlapo (born 13 May 1987) is a South African racing cyclist who represents South Africa in BMX (bicycle motocross). He was selected to represent South Africa at 2008 Beijing, China Summer Olympics and the 2012 London, England Summer Olympics in the men's BMX event. Sifiso has raced professionally since 2007 and has competed in the European and USA series. Sifiso placed second at the UCI SX race in Pietermaritzburg South Africa in 2010, in front of adoring fans.

Sifiso has become a well known public figure in South Africa and in the sporting arena. In December 2013, Sifiso married long time girlfriend Toni-Catherine Nhlapo. They reside in Florida, USA.
