= Mike Day (cyclist) =

American bicycle motocross rider (born 1984)

Personal information
- Full name: Michael Day
- Born: October 9, 1984 (age 42) Tarzana, California, U.S.

Cycling career
- Sport: Cycling
- Current team: GT Bicycles
- Discipline: Bicycle motocross (BMX)
- Role: Racer
- Rider type: Off Road

Amateur teams
- 1994-1999: Answer
- 1999-?: Sunland Cycles
- 2002: Staats Bicycles

Professional teams
- 2002-2006: Staats Bicycles
- 2007-Present: GT Bicycles
Medal record
Men's BMX racing
Representing United States
Olympic Games
Silver medal – second place	2008 Beijing	BMX racing
World Cup
Silver medal – second place	2004	BMX racing
Bronze medal – third place	2006	BMX racing

Mike Day (born October 9, 1984) is an American bicycle motocross (BMX) cyclist who has competed professionally since 1994. He won the silver medal in the men's BMX at the 2008 Summer Olympics in Beijing.

== Nickname ==
Day's official Union Cycliste Internationale (UCI) number - which was originally assigned to him by the American Bicycle Association - is #365, the number of days in a year (with the exception of leap years). As a result, his number and surname - 365 Day - relates to the common phrase "...365 days per year". The origin of the nickname is explained by Mike:

"When you turn pro, they always give you a number in the 300s," he said, "and with my name on the back, it said: 365 Day. Everyone talked about it, and I said, 'That's it. That's going to be my number.' I'll pretty much wear it till I'm done racing."

== Introduction to racing ==
He began cycling at the Valencia Raceway on his ninth birthday. He followed his older brother around on his rides so his father decided to take him to a race. His first race bike was a GT Interceptor

== Professional career ==
Day turned professional in April 2002, at the age of 17. His first professional result was second place at the American Bicycle Association (ABA) Winter Nationals in Phoenix, Arizona on April 6, 2002. His first professional win was in the "A" pro category at the National Bicycle League (NBL) Golden State National in Prunedale, California on May 5, 2002 (Day 1) He also won on Day 2 the next day.

In the seniors events, Day's first result was sixth place in "AA" Pro at the ABA Fall Nationals in Del Mar, California on October 26, 2002. His first win was in "AA" Pro at the ABA World Championship in Ontario, California on July 23, 2005 (Day2) It took Day three years to obtain his first Senior pro win.

His first race with GT (Gary Turner) Bicycles/Red Bull was the ABA Silverdollar National in Reno, Nevada on January 6, 2007

In 2005, Day won the 2005 NORA Cup. Day is a 2008 ABA Golden Crank winner for Pro of the Year.

== 2008 Summer Olympics ==
On June 14, 2008 Mike Day won a place on the USA BMX Olympic Team by winning the Team Trial at the Olympic Training Center in Chula Vista, California. This was the first United States BMX team to compete at the Olympic Games. For six months prior to the Olympics, Day trained at a duplicate of the track to be used in Beijing. Day refrained from competing in the UCI BMX World Championships in Beijing, China which were held two weeks prior.

On August 20, Day qualified for the Semi Finals, by winning both the Seeding Run time trials and was the overall winning of the three runnings of his Quarter Finals, sweeping all three. On August 22, Mike Day won the silver medal in the Men's BMX Final at the 2008 Summer Olympic Games, becoming the second American ever to win an Olympic medal for BMX.

‡Time Trial data from nbcolympics.com
†Quarter Finals data from nbcolympics.com
*Semi Finals data from nbcolympics.com
**Final (Medal round) data from nbcolympics.com
