= Gustaw Dadela =

Polish BMX rider

Personal information
- Born: 7 March 1995 (age 31)

Cycling career
- Sport: Cycling
- Discipline: BMX racing
- Role: Rider

Gustaw Dadela (born 7 March 1995) is a Polish BMX rider who represented Poland in the time trial event at the 2015 UCI BMX World Championships.
