= UCI Urban Cycling World Championships – Women's freestyle BMX =

The women's freestyle BMX is an event at the annual UCI Urban Cycling World Championships.

== Medalists ==
=== Freestyle Park ===
Championships	Gold	Silver	Bronze
2017 Chengdu	Hannah Roberts (USA)	Lara Marie Lessmann (GER)	Angie Marino (USA)
2018 Chengdu	Perris Benegas (USA)	Angie Marino (USA)	Hannah Roberts (USA)
2019 Chengdu	Hannah Roberts (USA)	Macarena Pérez (CHI)	Charlotte Worthington (GBR)
2021 Montpellier	Hannah Roberts (USA)	Nikita Ducarroz (SUI)	Charlotte Worthington (GBR)
2022 Abu Dhabi	Hannah Roberts (USA)	Nikita Ducarroz (SUI)	Iveta Miculyčová (CZE)
2023 Glasgow	Hannah Roberts (USA)	Sun Sibei (CHN)	Zhou Huimin (CHN)
2024 Abu Dhabi	Hannah Roberts (USA)	Sarah Nicki (AUS)	Natalya Diehm (AUS)
2025 Riyadh	Sun Sibei (CHN)	Sun Jiaqi (CHN)	Fan Xiaotong (CHN)

=== Freestyle Flatland ===
Championships	Gold	Silver	Bronze
2019 Chengdu	Irina Sadovnik (AUT)	Misaki Katagiri (JPN)	Julia Preuss (GER)
2021 Montpellier	Irina Sadovnik (AUT)	Julia Preuss (GER)	Céline Vaes (FRA)
2022 Abu Dhabi	Aude Cassagne (FRA)	Julia Preuss (GER)	Kirara Nakagawa (JPN)
2023 Glasgow	Aude Cassagne (FRA)	Letícia Moda (BRA)	Kirara Nakagawa (JPN)
2024 Abu Dhabi	Ayuna Miyashima (JPN)	Veronika Kádár (HUN)	Anna Mondics (HUN)
2025 Riyadh	Chiaki Todaka (JPN)	Carin Hommura (JPN)	Sona Yoshimura (JPN)

=== Medals by country ===
Rank	Nation	Gold	Silver	Bronze	Total
1	United States	7	1	2	10
2	Japan	2	2	3	7
3	France	2	0	1	3
4	Austria	2	0	0	2
5	China	1	2	2	5
6	Germany	0	3	1	4
7	Switzerland	0	2	0	2
8	Australia	0	1	1	2
8	Hungary	0	1	1	2
10	Brazil	0	1	0	1
10	Chile	0	1	0	1
12	Great Britain	0	0	2	2
13	Czech Republic	0	0	1	1
Totals (13 entries)		14	14	14	42
