= Cycling at the 2024 Summer Olympics – Qualification =

This article details the qualifying phase for cycling at the 2024 Summer Olympics. A total of 514 cyclists, with an equal distribution between men and women, competed in twenty-two medal events across five disciplines (road, track, mountain biking, BMX racing, and BMX freestyle) at these Games.

== Qualification summary ==
Nation	Road				Track												MTB		BMX				Total	
Nation	Men		Women		Men						Women						M	W	Men		Women		Places	Riders
Nation	RR	TT	RR	TT	TS	KE	SP	TP	OM	MD	TS	KE	SP	TP	OM	MD	M	W	RC	FR	RC	FR	Places	Riders
Algeria	1		1																				2	2
Argentina	1																		1				2	2
Aruba																					1		1	1
Australia	3	2	3	2	Yes	Yes	Yes	Yes	Yes	Yes		Yes	Yes	Yes	Yes	Yes		1	1		2		25	21
Austria	2	1	2	2					Yes	Yes							1	2					12	9
Belgium	4	2	4	1				Yes	Yes	Yes		Yes	Yes		Yes	Yes	2	1	1		1		23	22
Brazil	1		1														1	1		1	1		6	6
Burkina Faso			1																				1	1
Canada	2	2	2	1	Yes	Yes	Yes	Yes	Yes	Yes	Yes	Yes	Yes	Yes	Yes	Yes	1	1		1	1		23	22
Chile			1														1		1				3	3
China	1		1	1	Yes	Yes	Yes				Yes	Yes	Yes		Yes		1	1					16	9
Colombia	2		1			Yes	Yes		Yes			Yes	Yes				1		3		2	1	15	15
Costa Rica	1		1																				2	2
Cuba			1																				1	1
Cyprus			1																				1	1
Czech Republic	1		1						Yes	Yes							1	1					6	6
Denmark	4	2	2	2				Yes	Yes	Yes					Yes	Yes	1	2			1		19	16
Ecuador	1	1																	1				3	2
Egypt									Yes			Yes	Yes		Yes								4	3
Eritrea	1	1																					2	1
Estonia	1																	1					2	2
Finland			1	1													1						3	2
France	4	1	3	2	Yes	Yes	Yes	Yes	Yes	Yes		Yes	Yes	Yes	Yes	Yes	2	2	3	1	1	1	32	31
Germany	2	1	3	2	Yes	Yes	Yes	Yes	Yes	Yes	Yes	Yes	Yes	Yes	Yes	Yes	2	1	1		1		25	24
Great Britain	4	2	4	2	Yes	Yes	Yes	Yes	Yes	Yes	Yes	Yes	Yes	Yes	Yes	Yes	2	2	1	1	1	1	46	30
Greece	1																						1	1
Hong Kong	1		1												Yes								2	2
Hungary	1		1															1					3	3
Individual Neutral Athletes	1	1	2	1																			5	3
Indonesia									Yes														1	1
Iran	1																						1	1
Ireland	2	1	1											Yes	Yes	Yes							7	7
Israel	1		1			Yes	Yes										1						5	4
Italy	3	2	4	1				Yes	Yes	Yes		Yes	Yes	Yes	Yes	Yes	2	2	1				23	21
Japan	1		1		Yes	Yes	Yes	Yes	Yes	Yes		Yes	Yes	Yes	Yes	Yes		1			1		17	18
Kazakhstan	2	1				Yes	Yes																4	3
Latvia	1		1														1		1	1	1		6	6
Liechtenstein																	1						1	1
Lithuania			1			Yes	Yes								Yes								4	3
Luxembourg	1		1																				2	2
Malaysia			1			Yes	Yes					Yes	Yes										5	4
Mauritius	1		1															1					3	3
Mexico			1						Yes		Yes	Yes	Yes		Yes		1	1					8	8
Mongolia	1	1																					2	1
Morocco	1	1																	1				3	2
Namibia			1														1						2	2
Netherlands	3	1	4	2	Yes	Yes	Yes		Yes	Yes	Yes	Yes	Yes		Yes	Yes		2	2		3		27	21
New Zealand	2	1	2	1		Yes	Yes	Yes	Yes	Yes	Yes	Yes	Yes	Yes	Yes	Yes	1	1	1		1		23	23
Nigeria			1																				1	1
Norway	2	2	2	1											Yes		1						9	6
Panama	1																						1	1
Poland	1		3	2		Yes	Yes		Yes		Yes	Yes	Yes		Yes	Yes	1	1					16	13
Portugal	2	2	1						Yes	Yes					Yes			1					9	7
Romania																	1						1	1
Rwanda	1		1	1														1					4	3
Serbia	1		1																				2	2
Slovakia	1		1																				2	2
Slovenia	4	1	2	2														1					10	7
South Africa	1		2	1		Yes	Yes										1	1			1		9	7
South Korea	1		1																				2	2
Spain	3	1	2	1					Yes	Yes							2						11	9
Suriname						Yes	Yes																2	1
Sweden	1		1															1					3	3
Switzerland	2	2	3	1					Yes						Yes	Yes	2	2	2		2		21	18
Thailand	1		1	1		Yes	Yes												1				6	4
Trinidad and Tobago						Yes	Yes																2	1
Turkey	1																						1	1
Uganda	1																						1	1
Ukraine	1		1	1													1	1					5	4
United Arab Emirates			1																				1	1
United States	3	2	2	2					Yes					Yes	Yes	Yes	2	2	2	2	3	2	26	23
Uruguay	1																						1	1
Uzbekistan	1		2	1																			4	3
Venezuela	1																						1	1
Vietnam			1																				1	1
Total: 75 NOCs	90	35	90	35	8	26	26	10	15	22	8	23	23	10	15	22	36	36	24	1	24	1	544	267

Legend

- TS – Team sprint
- KE – Keirin
- SP – Sprint
- TP – Team pursuit
- OM – Omnium
- MD – Madison
- RR – Road race
- TT – Individual time trial
- RC – Race
- FR – Freestyle

== Timeline ==
The following table outlines a timeline of the qualification events for cycling at the 2024 Summer Olympics.

Event	Date	Venue
Road
2023 African Continental Championships	February 8–13, 2023	(Ghana) Accra
2023 Pan American Continental Championships	April 16–23, 2023	Panama
2023 Asian Continental Championships	June 7–13, 2023	(Thailand) Rayong
2023 UCI Road World Championships	August 3–13, 2023	(United Kingdom) Glasgow
Establishment of the UCI World Rankings by Nations	October 17, 2023	—N/a
Track
Establishment of the UCI Olympic Track Ranking 2022–2024	April 15, 2024	—N/a
Mountain biking
2023 Pan American Continental Championships	April 26–29, 2023	(Brazil) Congonhas
2023 African Continental Championships	June 2–4, 2023	(South Africa) Johannesburg
2023 UCI Mountain Bike World Championships	August 3–13, 2023	(United Kingdom) Glasgow
2023 Asian Continental Championships	October 26–28, 2023	(India) Panchkula
Establishment of the UCI Olympic qualification ranking	May 28, 2024	—N/a
BMX freestyle
2022 UCI Urban Cycling World Championships	November 9–13, 2022	(United Arab Emirates) Abu Dhabi
2023 UCI BMX Freestyle Park World Championships	August 3–13, 2023	(United Kingdom) Glasgow
2024 Olympic Qualifier Series	May 16–19, 2024; June 20–23, 2024	(China) Shanghai (Hungary) Budapest
BMX racing
2023 Pan American Continental Championships	May 20, 2023	(Ecuador) Riobamba
2023 Asian Continental Championships	July 16, 2023	(Philippines) Tagaytay City
2023 UCI BMX World Championships	August 3–13, 2023	(United Kingdom) Glasgow
2023 African Continental Championships	November 4–5, 2023	(Zimbabwe) Harare
2024 UCI BMX World Championships	May 12–18, 2024	(United States) Rock Hill
Establishment of the UCI Olympic qualification ranking	June 4, 2024	—N/a

== Road cycling ==
A total of 180 cyclists (90 per gender) raced through the Paris 2024 course. Each National Olympic Committee (NOC) could enter a maximum of eight riders (four per gender) in road cycling with specific parameters: a maximum of four in the men's and women's road races and two in the men's and women's road time trial. The majority of the berths were attributed to a specific number of riders per NOC based on the UCI Road World Ranking list by nations for the 2022–2023 season.

As the host country, France reserved a single men's and women's quota place in the road race. When one or two French cyclists qualified directly and regularly, their spare slots were reallocated to the next highest-ranked eligible NOCs in the aforementioned events based on the national order of the UCI World Ranking list by 17 October 2023. The remainder of the total quota were offered to the two highest-ranked NOCs (each composed of a single rider) vying for qualification at three of the continental meets (Africa, Asia, and the Americas) and at the 2023 UCI World Championships in and around Glasgow, Scotland.

For the time trial, thirty-five spots per gender were awarded to the NOCs ranked 1 to 25 from the UCI World Ranking list, respecting the minimum continental distribution, and the rest with only a single quota place each from the 2023 World Championships.

=== Men's road race ===
Quotas as of November 2023.

Event	Ranking by nation	Qualified NOC	Riders per NOC
Host nation	—N/a	—N/a	0
UCI World Ranking	1 to 5	Belgium; Denmark; Slovenia; Great Britain; France	4
UCI World Ranking	6 to 10	Spain; Netherlands; Italy; Australia; United States	3
UCI World Ranking	11 to 20	Switzerland; Portugal; Colombia; Norway; Germany; Austria; Ireland; Canada; Kazakhstan; New Zealand	2
UCI World Ranking	21 to 45	Eritrea; Individual Neutral Athletes; Ecuador; Poland; Latvia; Morocco; Czech Republic; Hungary; Mongolia; Japan; Algeria; Slovakia; Uzbekistan; Luxembourg; Greece; South Africa; Venezuela; Israel; Estonia; Turkey; Panama; Thailand; Argentina Serbia; Ukraine; China	1
2023 UCI Road World Championships	1 to 2	Sweden	1
2023 African Championships	1 to 2	Mauritius; Uganda	1
2023 Asian Championships	1 to 2	Iran; Hong Kong	1
2023 Pan American Championships	1 to 2	Brazil; Costa Rica	1
Reallocation of unused quota	—N/a	Rwanda; Uruguay; South Korea	1
Total			90

* Quota reduced by one to accommodate for the individual qualifiers

=== Men's individual time trial ===
Event	Ranking by nation	Qualified NOC	Riders per NOC
UCI World Ranking	1 to 25	Belgium; Denmark; Slovenia; Great Britain; France; Spain; Netherlands; Italy; Australia; United States; Switzerland; Portugal; ~~Colombia~~; Norway; Germany; Austria; Ireland; Canada; Kazakhstan; New Zealand; Eritrea; Ecuador; Individual Neutral Athletes; Morocco**; Mongolia**	1
2023 UCI Road World Championships	1 to 10	Belgium; Italy; Great Britain; United States; Portugal; Australia; Denmark; Norway; Switzerland; Canada	1
Invitational place	—	Amir Ansari (EOR)	1
Total			36

** Qualified as a continental representative

=== Women's road race ===
Quotas as of February 2024.

Event	Ranking by nation	Qualified NOC	Riders per NOC
Host nation	—N/a	—N/a	0
UCI World Ranking	1 to 5	Netherlands; Italy; Belgium; Switzerland; Great Britain	4
UCI World Ranking	6 to 10	Poland; France; Australia; Germany; Denmark	3
UCI World Ranking	11 to 20	United States; Canada; Austria; New Zealand; Spain; South Africa; Uzbekistan; Norway; Slovenia; Individual Neutral Athletes	2
UCI World Ranking	21 to 45	China; Finland; Ukraine; Thailand; Colombia; Luxembourg; Sweden; Czech Republic; Hong Kong; Cuba; South Korea; Rwanda; Ireland; Individual Neutral Athletes; Serbia; Slovakia; Mauritius; Brazil; Chile; Algeria; Namibia; Cyprus; Japan; Israel; Portugal	1
2023 UCI Road World Championships	1 to 2	Hungary; Latvia	1
2023 African Championships	1 to 2	Nigeria; Burkina Faso	1
2023 Asian Championships	1 to 2	Malaysia; Vietnam	1
2023 Pan American Championships	1 to 2	Mexico; Costa Rica	1
Reallocation of unused quota	—N/a	United Arab Emirates; Lithuania	1
Invitational place	—	Fariba Hashimi (AFG); Yulduz Hashimi (AFG); Eyeru Tesfoam Gebru (EOR)	1
Total			90

=== Women's individual time trial ===
Event	Ranking by nation	Qualified NOC	Riders per NOC
UCI World Ranking	1 to 25	Netherlands; Italy; Belgium; Switzerland; Poland; Great Britain; Australia; France; Germany; Canada; Denmark; United States; Austria; New Zealand; Spain; South Africa; Uzbekistan; Norway; Slovenia; China; Individual Neutral Athletes; Finland; Ukraine; Thailand; Rwanda**	1
2023 UCI Road World Championships	1 to 10	United States; Australia; Austria; Great Britain; France; Netherlands; Poland; Germany; Slovenia; Denmark	1
Total			35

** Qualified as a continental representative

== Track cycling ==
A total of 190 track cyclists, with an equal number of men and women, raced around the Paris 2024 velodrome. Each NOC could enter a maximum of fourteen track cyclists with a specific number of riders allotted per event: two per gender in sprint and keirin, a single rider each in the men's and women's omnium, a quartet of riders in the team pursuit, a trio in the team sprint, and a duo in the Madison race. All quota places offered in track cycling were attributed based on the points obtained in the UCI Track Olympic Ranking period for the 2022 to 2024 season. The quota places per event are listed as follows:

- Team sprint – top 8 teams of three riders per gender
- Team pursuit – top 10 teams of four riders per gender
- Madison – all NOCs with a qualified team pursuit, apart from the next five highest-ranked quartets (a total of 15 teams)
- Omnium – NOCs directly qualifying for Madison, apart from the seven riders without a team (a total of 22 individuals)
- Sprint – NOCs qualifying in team sprint enter two individuals, apart from the next seven highest-ranked riders in the individual sprint and the next seven highest-ranked in keirin (a total of 30 individuals)
- Keirin – NOCs qualifying in team sprint enter two individuals, in addition to the next 7 best-ranked in the individual sprint, and the next seven highest-ranked in keirin (a total of 30 individuals)

An NOC could enter qualify a maximum of 14 cyclists (seven per gender).

=== Men's team sprint ===
Event	Ranking by Nation	Qualified NOC	Teams per NOC
2022–2024 UCI Track Olympic Ranking	1 to 8	Australia; Netherlands; Japan; France; Great Britain; China; Germany; Canada	1
Total			8

=== Men's sprint ===
Event	Ranking by Nation	Qualified NOC	Riders per NOC
NOCs qualified for team sprint	—	Australia; Netherlands; Japan; France; Great Britain; China; Germany; Canada	up to 2
2022–2024 Olympic track ranking	1 to 7	Trinidad and Tobago; Poland; Israel; ~~Suriname~~; Malaysia; Lithuania; South Africa*; Colombia	1
NOCs qualified for Keirin	—	New Zealand; Thailand; Suriname; Kazakhstan	1
Total			30

* Qualified as a continental representative

=== Men's keirin ===
Event	Ranking by Nation	Qualified NOC	Riders per NOC
NOCs qualified for team sprint	—	Australia; Netherlands; Japan; France; Great Britain; China; Germany; Canada	up to 2
2022–2024 Olympic track ranking	1 to 7	Malaysia; Colombia; New Zealand; Trinidad and Tobago; Suriname; ~~Israel~~; Thailand; Kazakhstan	1
NOCs qualified for sprint	—	Poland; Lithuania; South Africa; Israel	1
Total			30

* Qualified as a continental representative

=== Men's team pursuit ===
Event	Ranking by Nation	Qualified NOC	Teams per NOC
2022–2024 UCI Track Olympic Ranking	1 to 10	Denmark; New Zealand; Australia; Italy; France; Great Britain; Japan; Canada; Germany; Belgium	1
Total			10

=== Men's Madison ===
Event	Ranking by Nation	Qualified NOC	Riders per NOC
NOCs qualified for team pursuit	—	Denmark; New Zealand; Australia; Italy; France; Great Britain; Japan; Canada; Germany; Belgium	1
2022–2024 UCI Track Olympic Ranking	1 to 5	Netherlands; Portugal; Spain; Czech Republic; Austria	1
Total			15

=== Men's omnium ===
Event	Ranking by Nation	Qualified NOC	Riders per NOC
NOCs directly qualified for Madison	—	Denmark; New Zealand; Australia; Italy; France; Great Britain; Japan; Canada; Germany; Belgium; Netherlands; Portugal; Spain; Czech Republic; Austria	1
2022–2024 UCI Track Olympic Ranking	1 to 7	United States; Poland; Switzerland; Colombia; Mexico; Indonesia; Egypt*	1
Total			22

* Qualified as a continental representative

=== Women's team sprint ===
Event	Ranking by Nation	Qualified NOC	Teams per NOC
2023–2024 UCI Track Olympic Ranking	1 to 8	Germany; Great Britain; China; Netherlands; Mexico; Poland; New Zealand; Canada	1
Total			8

=== Women's sprint ===
Event	Ranking by Nation	Qualified NOC	Riders per NOC
NOCs qualified for team sprint	—	Germany; Great Britain; China; Netherlands; Mexico; Poland; New Zealand; Canada	up to 2
2022–2024 Olympic track ranking	1 to 7	France; Japan; Colombia; Italy; Australia; Belgium; Egypt*	1
NOCs qualified for Keirin	—	Malaysia	1
Total			30

* Qualified as a continental representative

=== Women's keirin ===
Event	Ranking by Nation	Qualified NOC	Riders per NOC
NOCs qualified for team sprint	—	Germany; Great Britain; China; Netherlands; Mexico; Poland; New Zealand; Canada	up to 2
2022–2024 Olympic track ranking	1 to 7	Colombia; Japan; France; Belgium; Australia; Italy; Malaysia	1
NOCs qualified for sprint	—	Egypt	1
Total			30

* Qualified as a continental representative

=== Women's team pursuit ===
Event	Ranking by Nation	Qualified NOC	Teams per NOC
2022–2024 UCI Track Olympic Ranking	1 to 10	New Zealand; Great Britain; Italy; Australia; Canada; United States; France; Germany; Ireland; Japan	1
Total			10

=== Women's Madison ===
Event	Ranking by Nation	Qualified NOC	Riders per NOC
NOCs qualified for team pursuit	—	New Zealand; Great Britain; Italy; Australia; Canada; United States; France; Germany; Ireland; Japan	1
2022–2024 UCI Track Olympic Ranking	1 to 5	Denmark; Poland; Netherlands; Switzerland; Belgium	1
Total			15

=== Women's omnium ===
Event	Ranking by Nation	Qualified NOC	Riders per NOC
NOCs directly qualified for Madison	—	New Zealand; Great Britain; Italy; Australia; Canada; United States; France; Germany; Ireland; Japan; Denmark; Poland; Netherlands; Switzerland; Belgium	1
2022–2024 UCI Track Olympic Ranking	1 to 7	Norway; Portugal; Lithuania; China; Hong Kong; Mexico; Egypt*	1
Total			22

* Qualified as a continental representative

== Mountain biking ==
A total of 72 mountain bikers (36 per gender) raced through the Paris 2024 cross-country course, a slight reduction from those competing in Tokyo 2020 by four athletes. Each NOC could enter a maximum of four bikers (two per gender) in the men's and women's cross-country races. Host country France reserved one men's and women's quota place if unqualified, while two more spots were entitled to the eligible NOCs interested to have their mountain bikers compete for Paris 2024, as granted by the Universality principle.

The majority of the berths was awarded to the nineteen highest-ranked NOCs with a specific number of qualified bikers (a duo of riders for NOCs ranked 1 to 8 and a single rider for NOCs ranked 9 to 19) based on the points acquired throughout the biennial UCI Mountain Bike Olympic Qualification period (running from May 7, 2022, to May 26, 2024). Outside Europe and Oceania, the highest-ranked NOC per gender secured a single quota place at the cross-country continental championships for Africa, Asia, and the Americas. The remaining four spots were allocated to the top mountain bikers competing at the 2023 UCI World Championships in Glasgow and its outlying areas across Scotland, with two each in the elite and under-23, respectively.

=== Men's cross-country race ===
Quotas as of June 20 2024.

Event	Ranking by nation	Qualified NOC	Riders per NOC
Host nation	—N/a		
2024 UCI Olympic Qualification Ranking	1 to 8	Switzerland; France; Italy; Spain; United States; Germany; Belgium; Great Britain	2
2024 UCI Olympic Qualification Ranking	9 to 19	Brazil; Denmark; Canada; New Zealand; South Africa; Austria; Norway; Chile; Poland; Romania; Czech Republic	1
2023 African Championships	1	Namibia	1
2023 Pan American Championships	1	Mexico	1
2023 Asian Championships	1	China	1
2023 UCI Mountain Bike World Championships (elite)	1 to 2	Latvia; Colombia	1
2023 UCI Mountain Bike World Championships (under-23)	1 to 2	~~Netherlands~~; ~~Sweden~~	1
Universality places	—N/a	Liechtenstein	1
Re-allocations of unused quota places	—N/a	Israel; Ukraine; Finland	1
Total			36

=== Women's cross-country race ===
Quotas as of June 3 2024.

Event	Ranking by nation	Qualified NOC	Riders per NOC
Host nation	—N/a		
2024 UCI Olympic Qualification Ranking	1 to 8	Switzerland; France; United States; Netherlands; Italy; Austria; Denmark; Great Britain	2
2024 UCI Olympic Qualification Ranking	9 to 19	Germany; Brazil; Australia; Canada; Sweden; Czech Republic; Poland; Estonia; Ukraine; Portugal; South Africa	1
2023 African Championships	1	Mauritius	1
2023 Pan American Championships	1	Mexico	1
2023 Asian Championships	1	China	1
2023 UCI Mountain Bike World Championships (elite)	1 to 2	Slovenia; Hungary	1
2023 UCI Mountain Bike World Championships (under-23)	1 to 2	New Zealand; Japan	1
Universality places	—N/a	Rwanda	1
Re-allocations of unused quota places	—N/a	Belgium	1
Total			36

== BMX ==
=== BMX freestyle ===
Twenty-four quota places (12 per gender) were available to the BMX freestyle riders competing in Paris 2024, augmenting their roster size from the previous edition by six athletes. Each NOC could enter a maximum of two riders per gender in the men's and women's freestyle park. Host country France reserved one men's and women's quota place if unqualified.

The initial half of the total quota was distributed to the highest-ranked BMX freestyle riders (by name) through a two-month-long Olympic Qualifier Series (May to June 2024), while the remaining five spots per gender were offered, first to the highest-ranked NOC from continents without a representative, then once all continents were represented, to the overall highest-ranked NOCs competing, at the 2022 UCI Urban Cycling World Championships in Abu Dhabi, United Arab Emirates (two) and then the 2023 UCI World Championships in Glasgow (three).

==== Men's freestyle ====
Quotas as of June 26 2024.

Event	Quotas	Qualified NOC	Selected rider
Host nation	—N/a		
Olympic Qualifier Series	6	France	Anthony Jeanjean
Olympic Qualifier Series	6	Great Britain	Kieran Reilly
Olympic Qualifier Series	6	United States	Marcus Christopher
Olympic Qualifier Series	6	Brazil	Gustavo Oliveira
Olympic Qualifier Series	6	United States	Justin Dowell
Olympic Qualifier Series	6	Croatia	Marin Ranteš
2022 UCI Urban Cycling World Championships	2	Japan	Rim Nakamura
2022 UCI Urban Cycling World Championships	2	Australia	Logan Martin
2023 UCI BMX Freestyle World Championships	3	South Africa	Vincent Leygonie
2023 UCI BMX Freestyle World Championships	3	Argentina	José Torres
2023 UCI BMX Freestyle World Championships	3	Canada	Jeffrey Whaley
Reallocation of host nation quota (from 2023 World Championships)	1	Latvia	Ernests Zēbolds
Total	12		

==== Women's freestyle ====
Quotas as of July 4 2024.

Event	Ranking by nation	Qualified NOC	Selected rider
Host nation	—N/a	France	Laury Perez
Olympic Qualifier Series	1	United States	Hannah Roberts
Olympic Qualifier Series	2	China	Sun Jiaqi
Olympic Qualifier Series	3	China	Deng Yawen
Olympic Qualifier Series	4	United States	Perris Benegas
Olympic Qualifier Series	5	Switzerland	Nikita Ducarroz
Olympic Qualifier Series	6	Australia	Natalya Diehm
2022 UCI Urban Cycling World Championships	0	~~Switzerland~~	—N/a
2022 UCI Urban Cycling World Championships	1	Czech Republic	Iveta Miculyčová
2022 UCI Urban Cycling World Championships	2	Germany	Kim Lea Müller
2023 UCI BMX Freestyle World Championships	1	Great Britain	Charlotte Worthington
2023 UCI BMX Freestyle World Championships	2	Colombia	Queen Saray Villegas
2023 UCI BMX Freestyle World Championships	3	Chile	Macarena Perez Grasset
Total	12		

=== BMX racing ===
A total of 48 BMX riders (24 per gender) raced through the Paris 2024 course. Each NOC could enter a maximum of three spots per gender. Host country France reserved one men's and women's quota place if unqualified, while a further spot was entitled to the eligible NOCs interested to have their BMX racers compete for Paris 2024, as granted by the Universality principle.

The remainder of the total quota was allocated to the eligible NOCs across four qualification routes. Seventeen of them with a specific number of qualified riders (a trio for the top two NOCs, a duo for NOCs ranked 3 to 5, and a single rider for NOCs ranked 6 to 10) received a coveted spot based on the points accumulated throughout the biennial UCI BMX Olympic Qualification period (running from August 1, 2022, to June 4, 2024). Outside Europe and Oceania, the highest-ranked NOC per gender secured a single quota place at the BMX continental championships for Africa, Asia, and the Americas. The remaining four spots were allocated to the top BMX riders competing at the 2023 UCI World Championships in Glasgow and at the 2024 Worlds in Rock Hill, South Carolina.

==== Men's race ====
Quotas as of June 11 2024.

Event	Ranking by nation	Qualified NOC	Riders per NOC
2024 UCI Olympic Qualification Ranking	1 to 2	France; Colombia	3
2024 UCI Olympic Qualification Ranking	3 to 5	Switzerland; Netherlands; United States	2
2024 UCI Olympic Qualification Ranking	6 to 10	Great Britain; Australia; Argentina; New Zealand; Belgium	1
2023 African Championships	1	Morocco	1
2023 Pan American Championships	1	Ecuador	1
2023 Asian Championships	1	Thailand	1
2023 UCI BMX World Championships	1	Latvia	1
2024 UCI BMX World Championships	1	Chile	1
Reallocation of unused host country quota	1	Germany	1
Reallocation of Universality Places	—N/a	Italy	1
Total			24

** Qualified as a continental representative

==== Women's race ====
Quotas as of June 11 2024.

Event	Ranking by nation	Qualified NOC	Riders per NOC
2024 UCI Olympic Qualification Ranking	1 to 2	Netherlands; United States	3
2024 UCI Olympic Qualification Ranking	3 to 5	Switzerland; Australia; Colombia	2
2024 UCI Olympic Qualification Ranking	6 to 10	Great Britain; France; Denmark; Canada; Belgium	1
2023 African Championships	0	—N/a	1
2023 Pan American Championships	1	Brazil	1
2023 Asian Championships	1	Japan	1
2023 UCI BMX World Championships	1	Germany	1
2024 UCI BMX World Championships	1	New Zealand	1
Reallocation from 2023 African Championships	1	South Africa	1
Reallocation from unused host country quota	1	Latvia	1
Universality Places	1	Aruba	1
Total			24

** Qualified as a continental representative
