= 2024 UCI Urban Cycling World Championships =

Cycling world championships

- Venue: Abu Dhabi, United Arab Emirates
- Date: 17–21 December 2024
- Events: 10

The 2024 UCI Urban Cycling World Championships were held in Abu Dhabi, United Arab Emirates, from 17–21 December 2024.

A total of ten events took place: six trials and four Freestyle BMX events (two park and two flatland).

== Medal summary ==
=== Freestyle BMX ===
==== Flatland ====
| Event | Gold | Silver | Bronze |
|---|---|---|---|
| Men Elite | Matthias Dandois; France | Moto Sasaki; Japan | Jean William Prevost; Canada |
| Women Elite | Ayuna Miyashima; Japan | Veronika Kádár; Hungary | Anna Mondics; Hungary |

==== Park ====
| Event | Gold | Silver | Bronze |
|---|---|---|---|
| Men Elite | Logan Martin; Australia | José Torres; Argentina | Justin Dowell; United States |
| Women Elite | Hannah Roberts; United States | Sun Sibei; China | Fan Xiaotong; China |

=== Trials ===
| Event | Gold | Silver | Bronze |
|---|---|---|---|
| Teams | Spain; Eloi Palau; Julien Saenz de Ormijana; Ferran Gonzalo; Víctor Pérez; Vera Baron | France; Robin Berchiatti; Nathan Charra; Guillaume Camus; Roman Salaun; Nina Vabre | Germany; Oliver Widmann; Jonas Friedrich; Dennis Arnold; Carl Christ; Nina Reichenbach |
| Men Elite 20" | Alejandro Montalvo; Spain | Borja Conejos; Spain | Eloi Palau; Spain |
| Men Elite 26" | Jack Carthy; Great Britain | Charlie Rolls; Great Britain | Oliver Weightman; Great Britain |
| Women Elite | Alba Riera; Spain | Vera Baron; Spain | Nina Reichenbach; Germany |
| Men Junior 20" | Travis Asenjo; Spain | Guillaume Camus; France | Víctor Pérez; Spain |
| Men Junior 26" | Roman Salaun; France | Vojtech Hendrych; Czech Republic | Ferran Gonzalo; Spain |

== Results ==
=== Flatland ===
==== Men's Elite ====
The qualification round took place on 19 December 2024. The top twelve cyclists advance to the semifinals, held on 20 December. The best eight cyclists advance to the final, held on 21 December.

Semifinals

| Rank | Rider | Country | Total | Notes |
|---|---|---|---|---|
| 1 | Yu Shoji | Japan | 93.33 | Q |
| 2 | Yu Katagari | Japan | 93.17 | Q |
| 3 | Matthias Dandois | France | 91.00 | Q |
| 4 | Jean William Prevost | Canada | 90.83 | Q |
| 5 | Moto Sasaki | Japan | 88.67 | Q |
| 6 | Julien Baran | France | 86.83 | Q |
| 7 | Masato Ito | Japan | 85.33 | Q |
| 8 | Anatole Rahain | France | 84.50 | Q |
| 9 | Dustyn Alt | Germany | 84.00 | |
| 10 | Matt Wilhelm | United States | 78.83 | |
| 11 | Álvaro Hernández del Pozo | Spain | 77.33 | |
| 12 | Pakphum Poosa-Art | Thailand | 75.67 | |

Finals

| Rank | Rider | Country | Total |
|---|---|---|---|
| 1st place, gold medalist(s) | Matthias Dandois | France | 90.67 |
| 2nd place, silver medalist(s) | Moto Sasaki | Japan | 86.63 |
| 3rd place, bronze medalist(s) | Jean William Prevost | Canada | 84.00 |
| 4 | Yu Shoji | Japan | 83.70 |
| 5 | Yu Katagiri | Japan | 83.53 |
| 6 | Masato Ito | Japan | 83.00 |
| 7 | Julien Baran | France | 82.67 |
| 8 | Anatole Rahain | France | 80.33 |

==== Women's Elite ====
The qualification round took place on 20 December 2024. There were only four cyclists participating in the event. All four advance directly to the final, held on 21 December.

Qualification

| Rank | Rider | Country | Total | Notes |
|---|---|---|---|---|
| 1 | Kirara Nakagawa | Japan | 82.83 | Q |
| 2 | Ayuna Miyashima | Japan | 80.50 | Q |
| 3 | Veronika Kádár | Hungary | 71.83 | Q |
| 4 | Anna Mondics | Hungary | 65.50 | Q |

Finals

| Rank | Rider | Country | Total |
|---|---|---|---|
| 1st place, gold medalist(s) | Ayuna Miyashima | Japan | 73.67 |
| 2nd place, silver medalist(s) | Veronika Kádár | Hungary | 63.00 |
| 3rd place, bronze medalist(s) | Anna Mondics | Hungary | 60.00 |
| 4 | Kirara Nakagawa | Japan | 53.33 |

=== Park ===
==== Men's Elite ====
The qualification round took place on 19 December 2024. The top twenty-four cyclists advance to the semifinals, held on 20 December. The best twelve cyclists advance to the final, held on 21 December.

Semifinals

| Rank | Rider | Country | Total | Notes |
|---|---|---|---|---|
| 1 | Jordan Clark | United Kingdom | 88.00 | Q |
| 2 | Dylan Hessey | United Kingdom | 87.64 | Q |
| 3 | José Torres | Argentina | 86.30 | Q |
| 4 | Rimu Nakamura | Japan | 86.28 | Q |
| 5 | Justin Dowell | United States | 86.22 | Q |
| 6 | Kieran Reilly | United Kingdom | 86.18 | Q |
| 7 | Logan Martin | Australia | 85.08 | Q |
| 8 | Mike Varga | Canada | 83.04 | Q |
| 9 | Jude Jones | United Kingdom | 80.90 | Q |
| 10 | Shaun Gornall | United Kingdom | 80.58 | Q |
| 11 | Maxime Chalifour | Canada | 80.30 | Q |
| 12 | Luca Bertrand | France | 79.80 | Q |
| 13 | Kaden Stone | United States | 79.60 | |
| 14 | Gustavo Oliveira | Brazil | 79.48 | |
| 15 | Ernests Zēbolds | Latvia | 77.20 | |
| 16 | Jaka Remec | Slovenia | 75.30 | |
| 17 | Levi Weidmann | Netherlands | 75.00 | |
| 18 | Kevin Fabregue | France | 74.60 | |
| 19 | Daniel Dhers | Venezuela | 73.02 | |
| 20 | Alec Danelutti | Australia | 72.40 | |
| 21 | Bryce Tryon | United States | 72.20 | |
| 22 | Reef Way | United Kingdom | 67.76 | |
| 23 | Tom Clemens | Germany | 41.68 | |
| 24 | Nick Bruce | United States | 31.80 | |

Finals

| Rank | Rider | Country | Total |
|---|---|---|---|
| 1st place, gold medalist(s) | Logan Martin | Australia | 94.30 |
| 2nd place, silver medalist(s) | José Torres | Argentina | 91.60 |
| 3rd place, bronze medalist(s) | Justin Dowell | United States | 90.74 |
| 4 | Rimu Nakamura | Japan | 90.62 |
| 5 | Kieran Reilly | United Kingdom | 90.10 |
| 6 | Jordan Clark | United Kingdom | 87.78 |
| 7 | Mike Varga | Canada | 84.88 |
| 8 | Dylan Hessey | United Kingdom | 84.56 |
| 9 | Jude Jones | United Kingdom | 83.40 |
| 10 | Luca Bertrand | France | 80.30 |
| 11 | Shaun Gornall | United Kingdom | 78.20 |
| 12 | Maxime Chalifour | Canada | 76.60 |

==== Women's Elite ====
The qualification round took place on 20 December 2024. The top twelve cyclists advance directly to the final, held on 21 December.

Qualification

| Rank | Rider | Country | Total | Notes |
|---|---|---|---|---|
| 1 | Sun Sibei | China | 88.19 | Q |
| 2 | Hannah Roberts | United States | 86.90 | Q |
| 3 | Fan Xiaotong | China | 86.26 | Q |
| 4 | Zhao Shuhua | China | 84.42 | Q |
| 5 | Lei Shanshan | China | 84.20 | Q |
| 6 | Sun Jiaqi | China | 82.51 | Q |
| 7 | Queen Saray Villegas | Colombia | 80.99 | Q |
| 8 | Laury Perez | France | 80.72 | Q |
| 9 | Zhou Yuwei | China | 79.35 | Q |
| 10 | Natalya Diehm | Australia | 79.27 | Q |
| 11 | Sarah Nicki | Australia | 79.14 | Q |
| 12 | Sasha Pardoe | United Kingdom | 77.74 | Q |
| 13 | Lara Marie Lessmann | Germany | 77.35 | |
| 14 | Nikita Ducarroz | Switzerland | 76.97 | |
| 15 | Miharu Ozawa | Japan | 74.83 | |
| 16 | Eduarda Bordignon | Brazil | 73.41 | |
| 17 | Teresa Fernandez-Miranda | Spain | 69.40 | |
| 18 | Indy Kramer | Netherlands | 68.00 | |
| 19 | Angie Marino | United States | 61.40 | |
| 20 | Nene Naito | Japan | 60.48 | |
| 21 | Macarena Perez Grasset | Chile | 53.01 | |
| 22 | Kim Müller | Germany | 48.85 | |
| 23 | Lucía Cajková | Slovakia | 44.50 | |
| 24 | Cory Coffey | United States | 42.30 | |
| | Lilyana Seidler | Germany | DNS | |

Finals

| Rank | Rider | Country | Total |
|---|---|---|---|
| 1st place, gold medalist(s) | Hannah Roberts | United States | 95.70 |
| 2nd place, silver medalist(s) | Sun Sibei | China | 94.06 |
| 3rd place, bronze medalist(s) | Fan Xiaotong | China | 93.72 |
| 4 | Sun Jiaqi | China | 93.40 |
| 5 | Zhao Shuhua | China | 91.40 |
| 6 | Lei Shanshan | China | 90.26 |
| 7 | Laury Perez | France | 89.50 |
| 8 | Queen Saray Villegas | Colombia | 88.50 |
| 9 | Natalya Diehm | Australia | 85.28 |
| 10 | Sarah Nicki | Australia | 84.30 |
| 11 | Sasha Pardoe | United Kingdom | 83.90 |
| 12 | Zhou Yuwei | China | 79.80 |

=== Trials ===
==== Men's Elite 20" ====
The final took place on 21 December 2024. Six cyclists qualified from the semifinals took part.

| Rank | Rider | Country | Total |
|---|---|---|---|
| 1st place, gold medalist(s) | Alejandro Montalvo | Spain | 270 |
| 2nd place, silver medalist(s) | Borja Conejos | Spain | 200 |
| 3rd place, bronze medalist(s) | Eloi Palau | Spain | 200 |
| 4 | Thomas Pechhacker | Austria | 200 |
| 5 | Niilo Stenvall | Finland | 170 |
| 6 | Dominik Oswald | Germany | 140 |

==== Men's Elite 26" ====
The final took place on 21 December 2024. Six cyclists qualified from the semifinals took part.

| Rank | Rider | Country | Total |
|---|---|---|---|
| 1st place, gold medalist(s) | Jack Carthy | United Kingdom | 270 |
| 2nd place, silver medalist(s) | Charlie Rolls | United Kingdom | 250 |
| 3rd place, bronze medalist(s) | Oliver Weightman | United Kingdom | 230 |
| 4 | Julien Saenz de Ormijana | Spain | 190 |
| 5 | Daniel Baron | Spain | 190 |
| 6 | Marti Vayreda | Spain | 160 |

==== Men's Junior 20" ====
The final took place on 20 December 2024. Six cyclists qualified from the semifinals took part.

| Rank | Rider | Country | Total |
|---|---|---|---|
| 1st place, gold medalist(s) | Travis Asenjo | Spain | 250 |
| 2nd place, silver medalist(s) | Guillaume Camus | France | 210 |
| 3rd place, bronze medalist(s) | Víctor Pérez | Spain | 210 |
| 4 | Dennis Arnold | Germany | 200 |
| 5 | Cristian Bursi | Italy | 120 |
| 6 | Kotaro Yokota | Japan | 100 |

==== Men's Junior 26" ====
The final took place on 20 December 2024. Four cyclists qualified from the semifinals took part.

| Rank | Rider | Country | Total |
|---|---|---|---|
| 1st place, gold medalist(s) | Roman Salaun | France | 140 |
| 2nd place, silver medalist(s) | Vojtech Hendrych | Czech Republic | 120 |
| 3rd place, bronze medalist(s) | Ferran Gonzalo | Spain | 120 |
| 4 | Marc Salom | Spain | 110 |

==== Teams ====
The final took place on 17 December 2024. Eight teams took part.

| Rank | Country | Riders | Total |
|---|---|---|---|
| 1st place, gold medalist(s) | Spain | Eloi Palau; Julien Saenz de Ormijana; Ferran Gonzalo; Víctor Pérez; Vera Baron | 800 |
| 2nd place, silver medalist(s) | France | Robin Berchiatti; Nathan Charra; Guillaume Camus; Roman Salaun; Nina Vabre | 790 |
| 3rd place, bronze medalist(s) | Germany | Oliver Widmann; Jonas Friedrich; Dennis Arnold; Carl Christ; Nina Reichenbach | 730 |
| 4 | Switzerland | Loïc Vuillème; Lucien Leiser; Remi Pezzatti; Debi Studer; Toni Gonzalez | 640 |
| 5 | Japan | Ryoga Tsuchiya; Kotaro Yokota; Torai Yamashita; Runa Ichikawa; Ibuki Hamano | 570 |
| 6 | Czech Republic | Vojtech Hendrych; René Vymetal; Eliška Hríbková; Jakub Kalaš; Martin Damborský | 560 |
| 7 | Italy | Diego Crescenzi; Marco Nardinocchi; Michel Negrini | 510 |
| 8 | Slovakia | Samuel Hlavatý; Jakub Mudrák; Kristina Melišíková; Villiam Tóth | 390 |

==== Women's Elite ====
The final took place on 21 December 2024. Six cyclists qualified from the semifinals took part.

| Rank | Rider | Country | Total |
|---|---|---|---|
| 1st place, gold medalist(s) | Alba Riera | Spain | 210 |
| 2nd place, silver medalist(s) | Vera Baron | Spain | 200 |
| 3rd place, bronze medalist(s) | Nina Reichenbach | Germany | 180 |
| 4 | Eliška Hríbková | Czech Republic | 170 |
| 5 | Nina Vabre | France | 150 |
| 6 | Emilia Keikus | Germany | 140 |

== Medal table ==
* Host nation (United Arab Emirates)

| Rank | Nation | Gold | Silver | Bronze | Total |
|---|---|---|---|---|---|
| 1 | Spain | 4 | 5 | 3 | 12 |
| 2 | France | 2 | 2 | 0 | 4 |
| 3 | Great Britain | 1 | 1 | 1 | 3 |
| 4 | Japan | 1 | 1 | 0 | 2 |
| 5 | United States | 1 | 0 | 1 | 2 |
| 6 | Australia | 1 | 0 | 0 | 1 |
| 7 | China | 0 | 1 | 1 | 2 |
| 7 | Hungary | 0 | 1 | 1 | 2 |
| 9 | Argentina | 0 | 1 | 0 | 1 |
| 9 | Czech Republic | 0 | 1 | 0 | 1 |
| 11 | Germany | 0 | 0 | 2 | 2 |
| 12 | Canada | 0 | 0 | 1 | 1 |
| Totals (12 entries) | | 10 | 13 | 10 | 33 |
