= UCI Trials World Championships – Junior women's trials =

The junior women's trials is a trials event at the annual UCI Urban Cycling World Championships. It has been a UCI World Championship event since 2025.

== Medalists ==
Championships	Gold	Silver	Bronze
2025 Riyadh	Andrea Pérez; Spain	Yun Vilajosana; Spain	Emilia Keikus; Germany

== Medal table ==
Rank	Nation	Gold	Silver	Bronze	Total
1	Spain	1	1	0	2
2	Germany	0	0	1	1
Totals (2 entries)		1	1	1	3
