= Queen Saray Villegas =

Colombian cyclist (born 2003)

Personal information
- Full name: Queen Saray Villegas Serna
- Born: 3 June 2003 (age 23) Buga, Colombia

Cycling career
- Sport: Cycling
Medal record
Representing Colombia
Women's BMX freestyle
Event	1st	2nd	3rd
Pan American Championships	1	1	1
South American Games	0	1	0
Bolivarian Games	2	0	0
Junior Pan American Games	1	0	0
Total	4	2	1
Pan American Championships
Gold medal – first place	2021 Lima	Freestyle park
Silver medal – second place	2024 Santiago	Freestyle park
Bronze medal – third place	2023 Asunción	Freestyle park
South American Games
Silver medal – second place	2022 Asunción	Freestyle park
Bolivarian Games
Gold medal – first place	2024 Ayacucho	Freestyle park
Gold medal – first place	2025 Lima-Ayacucho	Freestyle park
Junior Pan American Games
Gold medal – first place	2025 Asunción	Freestyle park

Queen Saray Villegas Serna (born 3 June 2003) is a Colombian cyclist who competes in Freestyle BMX. She was a silver medalist at the 2022 South American Games.

== Early and personal life ==
She is from Buga in Valle del Cauca. She began BMX when she 13 years old. She was initially involved in BMX racing before focusing on BMX Freestyle. Her twin sister Lizsurley also competes in BMX.

== Career ==
In 2019 she finished fourth at both FISE World France and at the World Urban Games in Hungary.

She won the Pan American Games at the end of 2021 in Lima, Peru. She won silver at the 2022 South American Games.

She made her debut in the UCI BMX Freestyle World Championships in 2022, where she secured a sixth-place finish.

She competed at the UCI World Cycling Championships in Glasgow in August 2023. Competing at the 2023 Pan American BMX Freestyle Championship, held at the Olympic Park in Asunción, Paraguay, she won the bronze medal.

She was selected to compete at the 2024 Summer Olympics. She became the first Colombian cyclist to qualify for BMX Freestyle Park event. On 30 July 2024, she competed in the preliminaries and qualified amongst the top nine for the final. She crashed in the first final run, scoring 64.80. Later she improved to fourth place in the second run with 88.00 points, just 0.80 away from the bronze medal.

== Competitive history ==
All results are sourced from the Union Cycliste Internationale.

As of May 17th, 2026

=== Olympic Games ===
Event	Freestyle Park
(France) 2024 Paris	4th

=== UCI Cycling World Championships ===
Event	Freestyle Park
(United Arab Emirates) 2022 Abu Dhabi	6th
(United Kingdom) 2023 Glasgow	8th
(United Arab Emirates) 2024 Abu Dhabi	8th
(Saudi Arabia) 2025 Riyadh	9th

=== UCI BMX Freestyle Park World Cup ===
Season	1	2	3	4	Rank	Points
2022	MON; 5	BRU; 7	GOL —		8	1340
2023	DIR —	MON; 16	BRU; 10	BAZ; 15	18	700
2024	ENO —	MON —	SHA; 4		15	770
2025	MON; 6	SHA —	SAK —		17	670
2026	MON; 14	BIR	SHA		14	310
