= Cycling at the 2026 Asian Games – Women's BMX freestyle =

Women's BMX freestyle at the 2026 Asian Games
- Venue: Aichi International Exhibition Center Hall C
- Date: 26–27 September 2026
- Competitors: 6 from 4 nations

Medalists
gold medal	Sun Sibei	China
silver medal	Miharu Ozawa	Japan
bronze medal	Sun Jiaqi	China

The women's BMX freestyle competition at the 2026 Asian Games was held on 26 and 27 September 2026 at the Aichi International Exhibition Center Hall C. 6 cyclists from 4 nations competed. Sun Sibei of China won the first Asian Games title in the event, with Miharu Ozawa of Japan taking silver and Sun Jiaqi of China the bronze.

== Schedule ==
All times are Japan Standard Time (UTC+09:00)

Date	Time	Event
Saturday, 26 September 2026	9:30	Seeding
Sunday, 27 September 2026	9:30	Final

== Results ==
=== Seeding ===
All six riders advanced to the final, with the seeding results determining the start order of the final.

Rank	Athlete	Run 1	Run 2	Average
1	Sun Jiaqi (CHN)	82.00	85.60	83.80
2	Sun Sibei (CHN)	78.00	83.80	80.90
3	Miharu Ozawa (JPN)	76.20	79.80	78.00
4	Rena Shirai (JPN)	72.40	71.80	72.10
5	Oh Sinai (KOR)	57.00	59.00	58.00
6	Nur Airen Sofea Mohd Nor Aszeril (MAS)	20.00	31.40	25.70

=== Final ===
Rank	Athlete	Run 1	Run 2	Best Run
1st place, gold medalist(s)	Sun Sibei (CHN)	85.60	93.80	93.80
2nd place, silver medalist(s)	Miharu Ozawa (JPN)	25.60	91.20	91.20
3rd place, bronze medalist(s)	Sun Jiaqi (CHN)	86.80	90.20	90.20
4	Rena Shirai (JPN)	79.40	81.00	81.00
5	Oh Sinai (KOR)	59.40	61.40	61.40
6	Nur Airen Sofea Mohd Nor Aszeril (MAS)	11.40	31.60	31.60

== See also ==
- Cycling at the 2026 Asian Games – Men's BMX freestyle
