= Macarena Perez Grasset =

Chilean bicycle motocross rider (born 1996)

Macarena Pérez Grasset
Personal information
- Full name: Macarena Pérez Grasset
- Born: 19 December 1996 (age 29) Santiago, Chile

Cycling career
- Sport: Cycling
Medal record
Representing Chile
BMX freestyle
Event	1st	2nd	3rd
Urban World Championships	0	1	0
World Cup	0	0	1
World Cup rounds	0	2	2
Pan American Games	0	2	0
Pan American Championships	2	0	1
South American Games	1	1	0
Total	3	6	4
Urban World Championships
Silver medal – second place	2019 Chengdu	Freestyle park
Pan American Games
Silver medal – second place	2019 Lima	Freestyle park
Silver medal – second place	2023 Santiago	Freestyle park
Pan American Championships
Gold medal – first place	2023 Asunción	Freestyle park
Gold medal – first place	2024 Santiago	Freestyle park
Bronze medal – third place	2021 Lima	Freestyle park
South American Games
Gold medal – first place	2022 Asunción	Freestyle park
Silver medal – second place	2026 Santa Fe	Freestyle park

Macarena Pérez Grasset (born 12 August 1996) is a Chilean Freestyle BMX cyclist, who won the silver medal at the 2019 World Championships.

== Career ==
In 2017 she took second place in the VANS US OPEN on Huntington Beach and that same year she obtained two third places in the FISE WORLD CUP in Montpellier, France and then in Chengdu, China respectively.

In 2019 she took the 2nd place in the Pan American Games and became the first ever Chilean woman to win a world medal in the discipline, taking silver at the UCI Urban Cycling World Championships in Chengdu behind Hannah Roberts of the US. This performance also secured her place at the 2020 Summer Olympics. The judges awarded her 86.80 for a ride that included a perfectly landed suicide no-hander and a tailwhip backflip.

=== 2020 Olympics ===
Pérez opened the Olympic BMX Freestyle competition in the seeding round, thus providing the first performance of this sport in the Olympic history. She placed seventh in the seeding round. In the final she finished in eighth place among nine participants.

=== 2024 Olympics ===
In 2024 Pérez again qualified for the Olympics Games. She got a reallocated quota after Switzerland declined their second quota. In Paris Pérez obtained fifth place with a score of 84.55, just 4.25 away from the bronze medal. Her performance elevated her as the best Chilean cyclist at the Olympic Games along with Mario Masanés, who also obtained a fifth place in the sprint event at the 1948 London Olympics.

== Personal life ==
Pérez lived and trained for nine years in the United States and one year in Costa Rica. In November 2025, she announced her return to Chile.

== Competitive history ==
All results are sourced from the Union Cycliste Internationale.

As of August 6th, 2024

=== Olympic Games ===
Event	Freestyle Park
(Japan) 2020 Tokyo	8th
(France) 2024 Paris	5th

=== UCI Cycling World Championships ===
Event	Freestyle Park
(China) 2017 Chengdu	DNS
(China) 2018 Chengdu	7th
(China) 2019 Chengdu	Silver
(France) 2021 Montpellier	—
(United Arab Emirates) 2022 Abu Dhabi	14th
(United Kingdom) 2023 Glasgow	12th

=== UCI BMX Freestyle Park World Cup ===
Season	1	2	3	4	Rank	Points
2022	MON; 16	BRU —	GOL —		28	230
2023	DIR; 18	MON; 14	BRU; 14	BAZ; 13	15	790
2024	ENO; 2	MON —	SHA; 8		5	1470
