= Cycling at the 2026 Asian Games – Men's BMX freestyle =

Men's BMX freestyle at the 2026 Asian Games
- Venue: Aichi International Exhibition Center Hall C
- Date: 26–27 September 2026
- Competitors: 9 from 6 nations

Medalists
| gold medal | Rim Nakamura | Japan |
| silver medal | Kaede Ozawa | Japan |
| bronze medal | Sha Xiaolong | China |

The men's BMX freestyle competition at the 2026 Asian Games was held on 26 and 27 September 2026 at the Aichi International Exhibition Center Hall C. Rim Nakamura of Japan won the first Asian Games title in the event.

== Schedule ==
All times are Japan Standard Time (UTC+09:00)

| Date | Time | Event |
|---|---|---|
| Saturday, 26 September 2026 | 11:15 | Qualification heat 1 |
| Saturday, 26 September 2026 | 12:15 | Qualification heat 2 |
| Sunday, 27 September 2026 | 11:15 | Final |

== Results ==
=== Qualification ===
The riders were split into two heats, with the results merged into a single ranking; the top eight advanced to the final.

| Rank | Athlete | Heat | Run 1 | Run 2 | Average |
|---|---|---|---|---|---|
| 1 | Rim Nakamura (JPN) | 2 | 91.40 | 92.00 | 91.70 |
| 2 | Kaede Ozawa (JPN) | 2 | 85.40 | 84.80 | 85.10 |
| 3 | Sha Xiaolong (CHN) | 2 | 76.40 | 78.20 | 77.30 |
| 4 | Kim Yool (KOR) | 1 | 67.00 | 70.80 | 68.90 |
| 5 | Liu Xing (CHN) | 2 | 52.80 | 72.20 | 62.50 |
| 6 | Saithan Phetnum (THA) | 1 | 54.40 | 49.40 | 51.90 |
| 7 | Rungrueang Phamee (THA) | 1 | 20.20 | 58.00 | 39.10 |
| 8 | Cheng Chiao-hung (TPE) | 1 | 35.00 | 39.80 | 37.40 |
| 9 | Gilang Febriansyah (INA) | 1 | 40.20 | 24.80 | 32.50 |

Riders ranked 1–8 qualified for the final.

=== Final ===
| Rank | Athlete | Run 1 | Run 2 | Best Run |
|---|---|---|---|---|
| 1st place, gold medalist(s) | Rim Nakamura (JPN) | 92.80 | 96.20 | 96.20 |
| 2nd place, silver medalist(s) | Kaede Ozawa (JPN) | 88.20 | 90.00 | 90.00 |
| 3rd place, bronze medalist(s) | Sha Xiaolong (CHN) | 81.00 | 86.20 | 86.20 |
| 4 | Liu Xing (CHN) | 80.20 | 84.80 | 84.80 |
| 5 | Kim Yool (KOR) | 41.00 | 82.20 | 82.20 |
| 6 | Saithan Phetnum (THA) | 60.80 | 45.00 | 60.80 |
| 7 | Rungrueang Phamee (THA) | 34.20 | 54.20 | 54.20 |
| 8 | Cheng Chiao-hung (TPE) | 45.20 | 32.80 | 45.20 |

== See also ==
- Cycling at the 2026 Asian Games – Women's BMX freestyle
