= José Torres (cyclist) =

Argentine cyclist (born 1995)

José Torres Gil
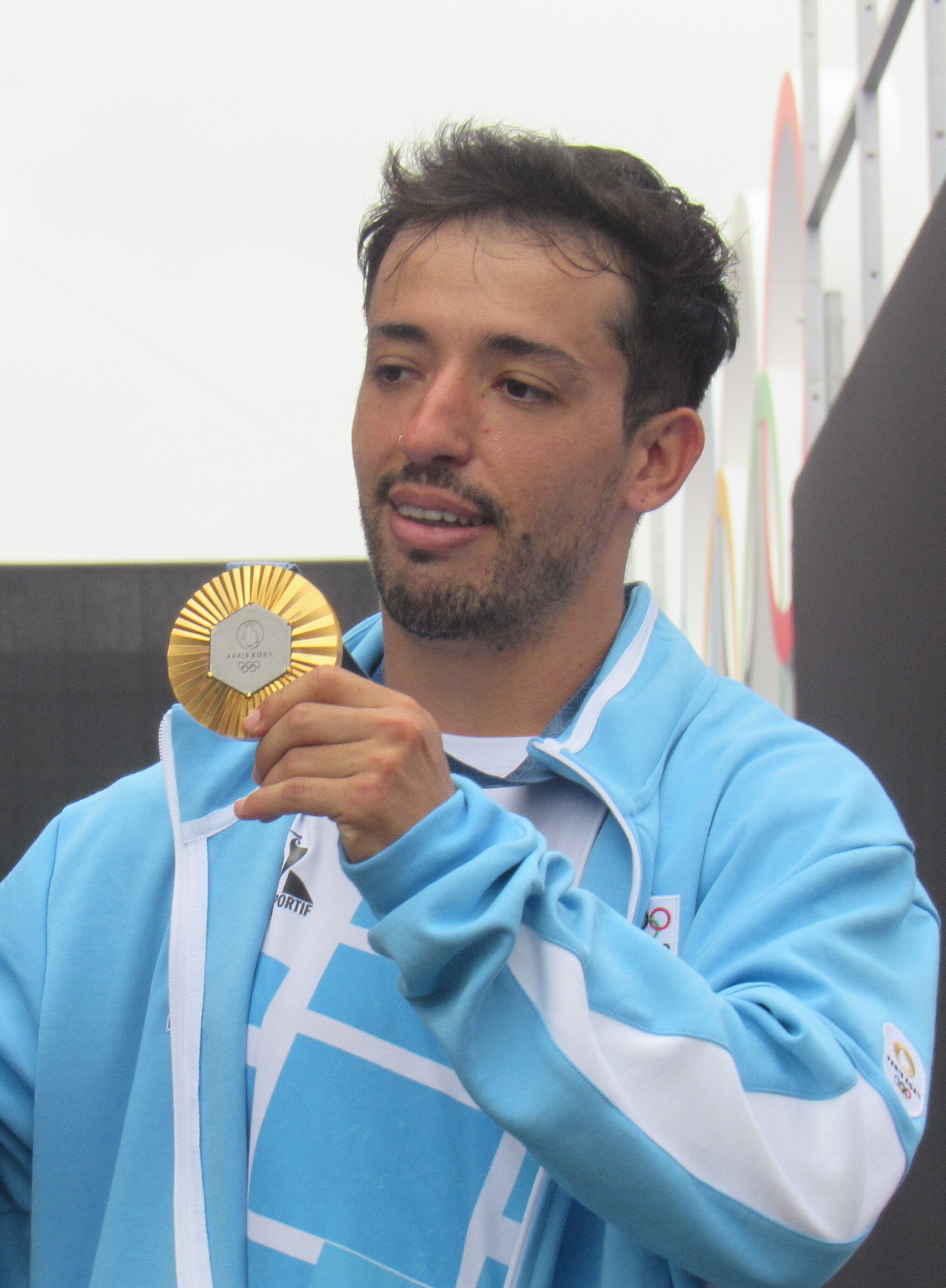
- Torres in 2024

Personal information
- Nickname: Maligno ("Despicable")
- Born: José Augusto Torres Gil; 28 March 1995 (age 31) Santa Cruz de la Sierra, Bolivia

Cycling career
- Sport: Cycling
Medal record
Representing Argentina
BMX freestyle
Event	1st	2nd	3rd
Olympic Games	1	0	0
World Championships	0	1	0
Pan American Games	1	1	0
Pan American Championships	2	1	0
South American Games	1	0	0
Total	5	3	0
Olympic Games
Gold medal – first place	2024 Paris	BMX freestyle
World Championships
Silver medal – second place	2024 Abu Dhabi	Freestyle Park
Pan American Games
Gold medal – first place	2023 Santiago	Freestyle park
Silver medal – second place	2019 Lima	Freestyle park
Pan American Championships
Gold medal – first place	2022 Lima	Freestyle park
Gold medal – first place	2024 Santiago	Freestyle park
Gold medal – first place	2025 Lima	Freestyle park
Silver medal – second place	2021 Lima	Freestyle park
South American Games
Gold medal – first place	2022 Asunción	Freestyle park

José Augusto Torres Gil (born 28 March 1995) is a cyclist who competes in freestyle BMX. Born in Bolivia, he represents Argentina internationally. He won a gold medal at the 2024 Summer Olympics.

== Career ==
Torres won a silver medal at the 2019 Pan American Games in Lima, Peru.

He competed at the 2023 UCI BMX Freestyle World Championships in Glasgow, Scotland. He won gold at the 2023 Pan American Games in Santiago, Chile.

He competed at the 2024 Summer Olympics in Paris where he came through the preliminary round to qualify for the final. He scored 94.82 in the first final run which was eventually enough to capture gold medal. He became the first Argentina's gold medalists in BMX freestyle.

In December 2024, he won silver at the 2024 UCI Urban Cycling World Championships in Abu Dhabi.

== Competitive history ==
All results are sourced from the Union Cycliste Internationale.

As of August 9th, 2024

=== Olympic Games ===
Event	Freestyle Park
(France) 2024 Paris	Gold

=== UCI Cycling World Championships ===
Event	Freestyle Park
(China) 2017 Chengdu	29th
(China) 2018 Chengdu	—
(China) 2019 Chengdu	—
(France) 2021 Montpellier	—
(United Arab Emirates) 2022 Abu Dhabi	5th
(United Kingdom) 2023 Glasgow	9th
(United Arab Emirates) 2024 Abu Dhabi	2nd

=== UCI BMX Freestyle Park World Cup ===
Season	1	2	3	4	Rank	Points
2022	MON; 10	BRU; 7	GOL —		10	1090
2023	DIR; 4	MON; 9	BRU; 6	BAZ; 31	6	1984
2024	ENO; 6	MON —	SHA —		18	670

== Personal life ==
Born in Bolivia, Torres is of Argentine descent through his parents. He is a dual citizen of Bolivia and Argentina.
