= Ernests Zēbolds =

Latvian cyclist (born 1999)

Personal information
- Full name: Ernests Zēbolds
- Born: 3 June 1999 (age 27)

Sport
- Country: Latvia
- Sport: Freestyle BMX

Ernests Zēbolds (born 3 June 1999) is a Latvian cyclist who competes in Freestyle BMX. He competed at thee 2024 Summer Olympics in Paris, where he placed eighth overall.

== Early life ==
He started BMX freestyle at ten years-old.

== Career ==
In 2021, he had a fourth place finish in Moscow in the final of the European BMX Freestyle Championship. In 2022, he finished in fifth place at the 2022 European BMX Championships in Munich.

In 2023, he won the Latvian national championships. That year, he finished in fourth place in the 2023 European Games. He reached the final of Freestyle Park competition at the UCI World Cycling Championships in Glasgow in August 2023.

In June 2024, he qualified for the 2024 Summer Olympics in Paris. Competing at the Games on 30 July 2024, he qualified for the final. Zēbolds finished sixth in the first final run. Although he improved in the second and scored personal best in his career, he finished in eighth place.

He qualified for the semi-finals of the 2024 UCI Urban Cycling World Championships in the Freestyle in Abu Dhabi, United Arab Emirates in December 2024. Zebolds scored 79.12 and 73.30 points in the qualifying heats, for an average of 76.21 points, which was the 15th best result out of 43 athletes with the 24 best scorers qualified for the semi-finals.

== Personal life ==
He based himself in Australia for a few months after the 2024 Olympics preparation for the World Championships, but later moved to Liepāja in Western Latvia. He has been described as an influencer.

== Competitive history ==
All results are sourced from the Union Cycliste Internationale.

As of August 7th, 2024

=== Olympic Games ===
Event	Freestyle Park
(France) 2024 Paris	8th

=== UCI Cycling World Championships ===
Event	Freestyle Park
(China) 2018 Chengdu	20th
(China) 2019 Chengdu	—
(France) 2021 Montpellier	21st
(United Arab Emirates) 2022 Abu Dhabi	32nd
(United Kingdom) 2023 Glasgow	13th

=== UCI BMX Freestyle Park World Cup ===
Season	1	2	3	4	Rank	Points
2022	MON; 21	BRU —	GOL; 19		26	230
2023	DIR; 15	MON; 25	BRU; 32	BAZ; 20	30	433
2024	ENO; 14	MON —	SHA		26	310
