= Bicycle trials =

Bicycle trials may refer to:

- Individual time trials
- Mountain bike trials
- Track time trials
