= Oliver Widmann =

German mountain bike trials cyclist

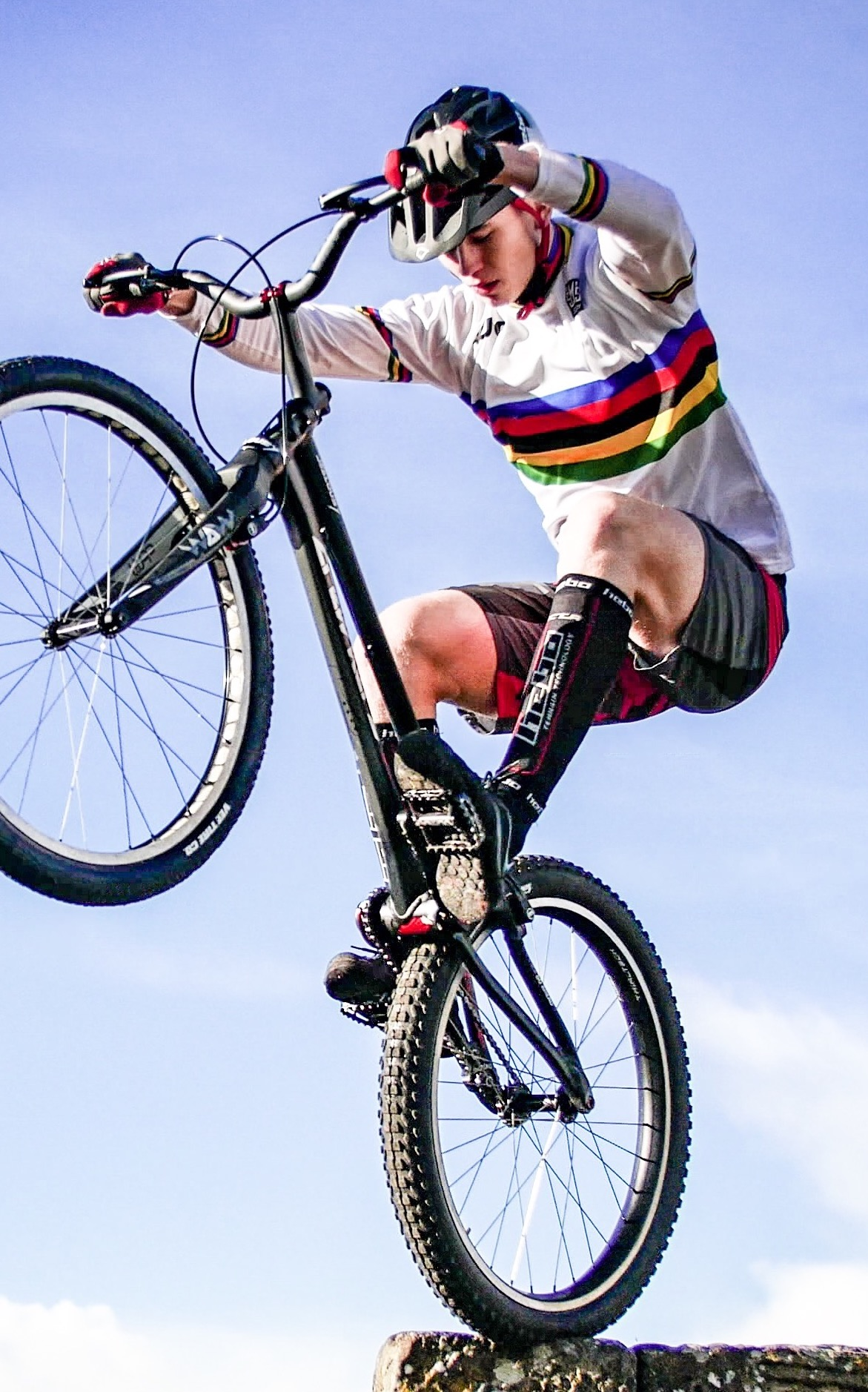
- UCI Trials World Champion, Men Junior 26"

Personal information
- Born: 22 August 2001 (age 25)

Cycling career
- Sport: Cycling
- Current team: Crewkerz Team
- Discipline: Trials
- Role: Rider
- Rider type: 26-inch Wheel Size

Major wins
- UCI World Champion, Men Junior 26" (2018/19) UEC European Champion, Men Junior 26" (2018/19)
Medal record
Representing Germany
Men's mountain bike trials
World Championships
Bronze medal – third place	2024 Abu Dhabi	Teams

Oliver Widmann (born 22 August 2001 in Ludwigsburg) is a German mountain bike trials cyclist who competes in the 26-inch category. He is a member of the national trials team "Bund Deutscher Radfahrer".

== Career ==
In November 2018 Widmann won the UCI Urban Cycling World Championships in the men junior trials 26-inch category. In 2019, he successfully defended his title. He also claimed the European and German champion titles in 2018 and 2019. At the UCI Urban Cycling World Championships 2018 he finished second with the German national team.

In the years 2015, 2016, and 2017 he became vice world champion at the UCI Trials World Youth Games in the 20-inch category.

2019

- (gold) UCI Urban Cycling World Championships - Trials 26“, Junior
- (gold) European Championships - Trials 26“, Junior
- (gold) German Championships - Trials 26“, Junior

2018

- UCI Urban Cycling World Championships - Team Trials
- (gold) UCI Urban Cycling World Championships - Trials 26“, Junior
- (gold) European Championships - Trials 26“, Junior
- (gold) German Championships - Trials 26“, Junior
