= Vincent Leygonie =

South African BMX cyclist

Personal information
- Born: October 27, 1997 (age 28) Krugersdorp, Gauteng, South Africa

Cycling career
- Sport: Cycling
- Discipline: BMX freestyle

Vincent Leygonie (born October 27, 1997) is a South African BMX cyclist in the freestyle discipline.

== Career ==
Leygonie won the 2023 South African national freestyle championships.

=== 2024 Olympics ===
In June 2024, Leygonie qualified for the 2024 Summer Olympics in BMX Freestyle Park event. He became the first African cyclist, male or female, to take part in this event. Leygonie finished 12th in the qualification round and didn't advance to the final.

== Competitive history ==
All results are sourced from the Union Cycliste Internationale.

As of August 7th, 2024

=== Olympic Games ===
Event	Freestyle Park
(France) 2024 Paris	12th

=== UCI Cycling World Championships ===
Event	Freestyle Park
(United Kingdom) 2023 Glasgow	65th
