= Cycling at the 2019 Pan American Games – Men's BMX freestyle =

Men's BMX freestyle at the 2019 Pan American Games
- Venue: Circuito BMX
- Date: 11 August 2019
- Competitors: 8 from 8 nations
- Winning score: 88.50

Medalists
Gold medal	Daniel Dhers	Venezuela
Silver medal	José Torres	Argentina
Bronze medal	Justin Dowell	United States

The men's BMX freestyle competition of the cycling events at the 2019 Pan American Games was held on 11 August 2019 at the Circuito BMX.

== Schedule ==
Date	Time	Round
11 August 2019	12:01	Seeding
11 August 2019	13:13	Final

== Results ==
=== Seeding ===
8 riders from 8 countries was started

Rank	Name	Nation	Run 1	Run 2	Score
1	Julio Mosquera	Ecuador	82.33	84.67	83.50
2	Daniel Dhers	Venezuela	79.33	81.50	80.42
3	Justin Dowell	United States	78.83	81.00	79.92
4	Kenneth Tencio	Costa Rica	80.00	79.17	79.58
5	José Torres	Argentina	77.67	77.17	77.42
6	Jaden Chipman	Canada	73.33	80.67	77.00
7	Cauan Madona	Brazil	68.33	60.33	64.33
8	Job Montañez	Peru	62.50	63.67	63.08

=== Final ===
Rank	Name	Nation	Run 1	Run 2	Score
1st place, gold medalist(s)	Daniel Dhers	Venezuela	50.33	88.50	88.50
2nd place, silver medalist(s)	José Torres	Argentina	46.00	87.33	87.33
3rd place, bronze medalist(s)	Justin Dowell	United States	84.33	85.17	85.17
4	Julio Mosquera	Ecuador	78.67	83.00	83.00
5	Kenneth Tencio	Costa Rica	77.00	62.00	77.00
6	Cauan Madona	Brazil	73.67	64.67	73.67
7	Jaden Chipman	Canada	42.67	71.33	71.33
8	Job Montañez	Peru	57.67	63.00	63.00
