= Jeffrey Whaley =

Canadian BMX cyclist

Jeffrey Whaley OLY
Personal information
- Born: March 10, 1996 (age 30) Montreal, Quebec, Canada

Cycling career
- Sport: Cycling
- Discipline: BMX freestyle

Jeffrey Whaley (born March 10, 1996) is a Canadian BMX cyclist in the freestyle discipline.

== Career ==
In June 2024, Whaley was named to Canada's Olympic team. Whaley became the first BMX freestyle cyclist to compete for Canada at the Olympics. He finished 10th in the qualification round, missing out on advancing to the final by one spot. After the competition Whaley stated he had to get back on bike after an injury and also had tough practices after two crashes and a collision.

== Competitive history ==
All results are sourced from the Union Cycliste Internationale.

As of August 6th, 2024

=== Olympic Games ===
Event	Freestyle Park
(France) 2024 Paris	10th

=== UCI Cycling World Championships ===
Event	Freestyle Park
(United Arab Emirates) 2022 Abu Dhabi	50th
(United Kingdom) 2023 Glasgow	12th

=== UCI BMX Freestyle Park World Cup ===
Season	1	2	3	4	Rank	Points
2022	MON; 43	BRU; 22	GOL —		37	82
2023	DIR; 30	MON; 44	BRU —	BAZ; 16	32	266
2024	ENO; 15	MON —	SHA		29	270
