= Lara Lessmann =

German freestyle BMX rider (born 2000)

Personal information
- Full name: Lara Marie Lessmann
- Born: 10 February 2000 (age 26) Flensburg, Germany

Cycling career
- Sport: Cycling
- Discipline: Freestyle BMX

Lara Marie Lessmann (born 10 February 2000) is a German Freestyle BMX rider based in Berlin.

Originally from Flensburg in the north German state of Schleswig-Holstein, she moved to the German capital because of the better training conditions in Berlin's Mellowpark.

She finished second at the 2017 UCI Freestyle BMX World Championships and won the gold medal at the 2018 Youth Olympic Games in Argentina in the mixed team event with Evan Brandes. She also won rounds in Croatia and China at the UCI World Cup Series.

== Competitive history ==
All results are sourced from the Union Cycliste Internationale.

As of August 6th, 2024

=== Olympic Games ===
Event	Freestyle Park
(Japan) 2020 Tokyo	6th

=== UCI Cycling World Championships ===
Event	Freestyle Park
(China) 2017 Chengdu	Silver
(China) 2018 Chengdu	4th
(China) 2019 Chengdu	4th
(France) 2021 Montpellier	12th
(United Arab Emirates) 2022 Abu Dhabi	11th
(United Kingdom) 2023 Glasgow	14th

=== UCI BMX Freestyle World Cup ===
Season	1	2	3	4	Rank	Points
2022	MON; 2	BRU; 5	GOL; DNS		6	1620
2023	DIR; 15	MON; 9	BRU —	BAZ; 21	16	790
2024	ENO; 15	MON —	SHA		26	270
