= Sun Jiaqi =

Chinese BMX rider (born 2004)

Personal information
- Full name: Sun Jiaqi
- Born: 26 April 2004 (age 22) Luohe, China

Sport
- Country: China
- Sport: Freestyle BMX
- Coached by: Daniel Dhers
Medal record
Women's BMX
Representing China
World Championships
Silver medal – second place	2025 Riyadh	Freestyle Park
Asian Games
Bronze medal – third place	2026 Aichi–Nagoya	Freestyle

Sun Jiaqi (Chinese: 孙佳琪, born 26 April 2004) is a Chinese freestyle BMX cyclist who competed at the 2024 Summer Olympics.

== Career ==
In 2022, she finished second in the Chinese championships and competed for the first time in the 2022 UCI Urban Cycling World Championships, where she was eliminated in the qualification. Four weeks later, she won the BMX Freestyle World Cup in Gold Coast, Australia, ahead of world champion Hannah Roberts. She became the first Chinese World Cup champion.

At the first round of the 2023 World Cup in Diriyya, she finished second behind Roberts. In June 2023, she won the Madrid Urban Sports Festival. She is coached by Daniel Dhers.

During the first leg of the 2024 Olympic Qualifier Series in Shanghai she finished in second place with a score of 93.68. During the second leg of the qualifier series in Budapest, she finished in third place with a score of 91.30. As a result, she qualified to represent China at the 2024 Summer Olympics. During the women's BMX freestyle event she finished in seventh place with a score of 70.80. During the final seconds of her first, she clipped her front tire on the spine and landed hard on her full-faced helmet.

In November 2025, she was the silver medalist behind compatriot Sun Sibei in the freestyle park at the UCI Urban Cycling World Championships 2025 in Riyadh.

== Competitive history ==
All results are sourced from the Union Cycliste Internationale.

As of August 5, 2024

=== Olympic Games ===
Event	Freestyle Park
(France) 2024 Paris	7th

=== UCI Cycling World Championships ===
Event	Freestyle Park
(United Arab Emirates) 2022 Abu Dhabi	23rd

=== UCI BMX Freestyle Park World Cup ===
Season	1	2	3	4	Rank	Points
2022	MON —	BRU —	GOL; 1		12	1000
2023	DIR; 2	MON; 6	BRU —	BAZ; 10	6	1570
2024	ENO; 16	MON —	SHA		28	230
