= Angie Marino =

American bicycle motocross rider

Personal information
- Born: March 27, 1990 (age 35)

Angie Marino (born March 27, 1990) is an American Freestyle BMX cyclist.

She grew up in Buffalo, New York although she now resides in North Carolina. She picked up her first BMX when her older brother was interested and she quickly began racing. By age 15, she made the switch to Freestyle BMX. Marino won bronze at the 2017 UCI Urban Cycling World Championships, and in 2018 she would podium again at the same event. She was named by ESPN as one of the top 50 Female Athletes in Action Sports, named 17th in ESPN's X Games Most Unstoppable Women in action sports, and featured ons bike doing stunts in the 2016 film Bad Moms.

She created "Yeah Zine" which eventually became "The Bloom" BMX website along with fellow pro rider Beatrice Trang to promote BMX for girls.

== Competitive history ==
All results are sourced from the Union Cycliste Internationale.

As of August 6th, 2024

=== UCI Cycling World Championships ===
Event	Freestyle Park
(China) 2017 Chengdu	Bronze
(China) 2018 Chengdu	Silver
(China) 2019 Chengdu	14th
(France) 2021 Montpellier	6th
(United Arab Emirates) 2022 Abu Dhabi	9th
(United Kingdom) 2023 Glasgow	19th

=== UCI BMX Freestyle World Cup ===
Season	1	2	3	4	Rank	Points
2022	MON; 8	BRU; 8	GOL; 10		7	1610
2023	DIR; 21	MON; 13	BRU; 26	BAZ; 18	23	469
2024	ENO; 12	MON —	SHA		22	390
