= Cory Coffey =

American BMX rider

Cory Coffey (born 1982 in Ojai, California) is a female BMX rider, and the first female to perform a backflip. She is often referred to with the title "Miss." Coffey is currently the 2xs reigning women's world champion for street BMX, although the contest has not been held since 2005.

== Racing career ==
After racing BMX for three years, Coffey decided when she was 17 years old to move away from racing in order to ride ramps and pedal less. Coffey has had 10 knee surgeries. She also received a severe concussion during the MTV Sports and Music Festival in Las Vegas.

== Sponsors ==
- Intense, Eye BMX, Kali, Fluid, ODI, Freestyle
