= Sun Sibei =

Chinese BMX rider

Personal information
- Full name: Sun Sibei

Sport
- Country: China
- Sport: Freestyle BMX
- Coached by: Daniel Dhers
Medal record
Women's BMX
Representing China
World Championships
Gold medal – first place	2025 Riyadh	Freestyle Park
Silver medal – second place	2024 Abu Dhabi	Freestyle Park
Silver medal – second place	2023 Glasgow	Freestyle Park
Asian Games
Gold medal – first place	2026 Aichi–Nagoya	Freestyle

Sun Sibei is a Chinese cyclist who competes in freestyle BMX. She is the reigning world champion having won the gold medal at the 2025 UCI Urban Cycling World Championships. She also won the gold medal at the 2026 Asian Games. She was previously a silver medalist at the 2023 UCI BMX Freestyle World Championships and 2024 UCI Urban Cycling World Championships.

== Early life ==
She is from Hebei Province, and took part in the martial art Wushu prior to being introduced to Freestyle Park in 2018.

== Career ==
Coaches by Daniel Dhers, she was the silver medalist at the 2023 UCI BMX Freestyle World Championships in Glasgow, Scotland.

In early 2024, she was selected to compete at the 2024 Olympic Qualifier Series. She won the women's BMX Freestyle Park at OQS Shanghai. That year she reached number two in the world rankings.

In October 2024, she won the UCI BMX Park Freestyle World Cup Women’s Final in Shanghai. In December 2024, he won silver at the 2024 UCI Urban Cycling World Championships in Abu Dhabi.

In November 2025, she won the gold medal in the freestyle park at the UCI Urban Cycling World Championships 2025.

In September 2026, she won the gold medal in the freestyle competition at the 2026 Asian Games in Japan, recovering from a crash during the warm-up.
