= Aude Cassagne =

French cyclist

Personal information
- Born: 3 October 1990 (age 35) Toulouse, France

Sport
- Country: France
- Sport: Flatland BMX
Medal record
Women's Flatland BMX
Representing France
Urban World Championships
Gold medal – first place	2022 Abu Dhabi	Flatland BMX

Aude Cassagne (born 3 October 1990) is a French cyclist. She is the 2022 World Champion in Flatland BMX.

== Early life ==
From Toulouse, she received her first BMX aged 12 after visiting a FISE event with her family. Her brother Maxine was also a keen BMX rider. She combined practising BMX with her studies, through which she completed medical school, qualified as a doctor, and moved to Bordeaux.

== Career ==
In November 2022 Cassagne won the 2022 UCI Urban Cycling World Championships held in Abu Dhabi in the Flatland BMX event. Previous to this, she had become the French champion in October 2022 at the national championships held in Montpellier.
