= 2025 UCI Urban Cycling World Championships =

Annual world championships in urban cycling disciplines

- Venue: Riyadh, Saudi Arabia
- Date: 4 – 8 November 2025
- Events: 11

The 2025 UCI Urban Cycling World Championships were held in Riyadh, Saudi Arabia, from 4 to 8 November 2025. The event was organized by the Union Cycliste Internationale (UCI) and hosted by the Saudi Cycling Federation, marking the first time the championships were staged in the Kingdom.

== Background ==
The UCI Urban Cycling World Championships were inaugurated in 2017 to bring together the disciplines of BMX freestyle (park and flatland) and cycling trialsThe 2025 edition was the ninth staging of the championships and the first hosted in the Middle East.

== Significance ==
The Riyadh championships were part of Saudi Arabia's wider strategy to host major international sporting events. The competition was described as 'a showcase of style, progression, and amplitude in urban cycling'.

== Events ==
The championships featured 11 world titles across BMX freestyle and trials disciplines. More than 230 riders from over 40 countries competed in Boulevard City, Riyadh.

== Medal summary ==
=== Trials ===
Event	Gold	Silver	Bronze
Men
Men's elite 20"	Alejandro Montalvo Milla; Spain	Eloi Palau Pinyana; Spain	Niilo Stenvall; Finland
Men's junior 20"	Travis Asenjo Jandackova; Spain	Ugo Theunissen; Belgium	Louis Chasseuil; France
Men's elite 26"	Charlie Rolls; Great Britain	Julen Saenz; Spain	Oliver Weightman; Great Britain
Men's junior 26"	Ferran Gonzalo Vaquer; Spain	Carl Gustaf Christ; Germany	Ian Martinez Borlaf; Spain
Women
Women's elite open	Alba Riera Roura; Spain	Vera Baron Rodriguez; Spain	Nina Vabre; France
Women's junior open	Andrea Perez Zamora; Spain	Yun Vilajosana Galdran; Spain	Emilia Keikus; Germany
Mixed
Mixed open team	Spain	Germany	France

=== BMX Flatland ===
Event	Gold	Silver	Bronze
Men's elite	Katagiri Yu; Japan	Jean William Provost; Canada	Dustyn Alt; Germany
Women's elite	Todaka Chiadi; Japan	Hommura Karin; Japan	Toshimura Soni; Japan

=== BMX Freestyle Park ===
Event	Gold	Silver	Bronze
Men's elite	Anthony Jeanjean; France	Marcus Christopher; United States	Logan Martin; Australia
Women's elite	Sun Sibei; China	Sun Jiaqi; China	Fan Xiaotong; China

== Medal table ==
* Host nation (Saudi Arabia)

Rank	Nation	Gold	Silver	Bronze	Total
1	Spain	6	4	1	11
2	Japan	2	1	1	4
3	China	1	1	1	3
4	France	1	0	3	4
5	Great Britain	1	0	1	2
6	Germany	0	2	2	4
7	Belgium	0	1	0	1
7	Canada	0	1	0	1
7	United States	0	1	0	1
10	Australia	0	0	1	1
10	Finland	0	0	1	1
Totals (11 entries)		11	11	11	33
