= Hannah Roberts (BMX cyclist) =

American cyclist (born 2001)

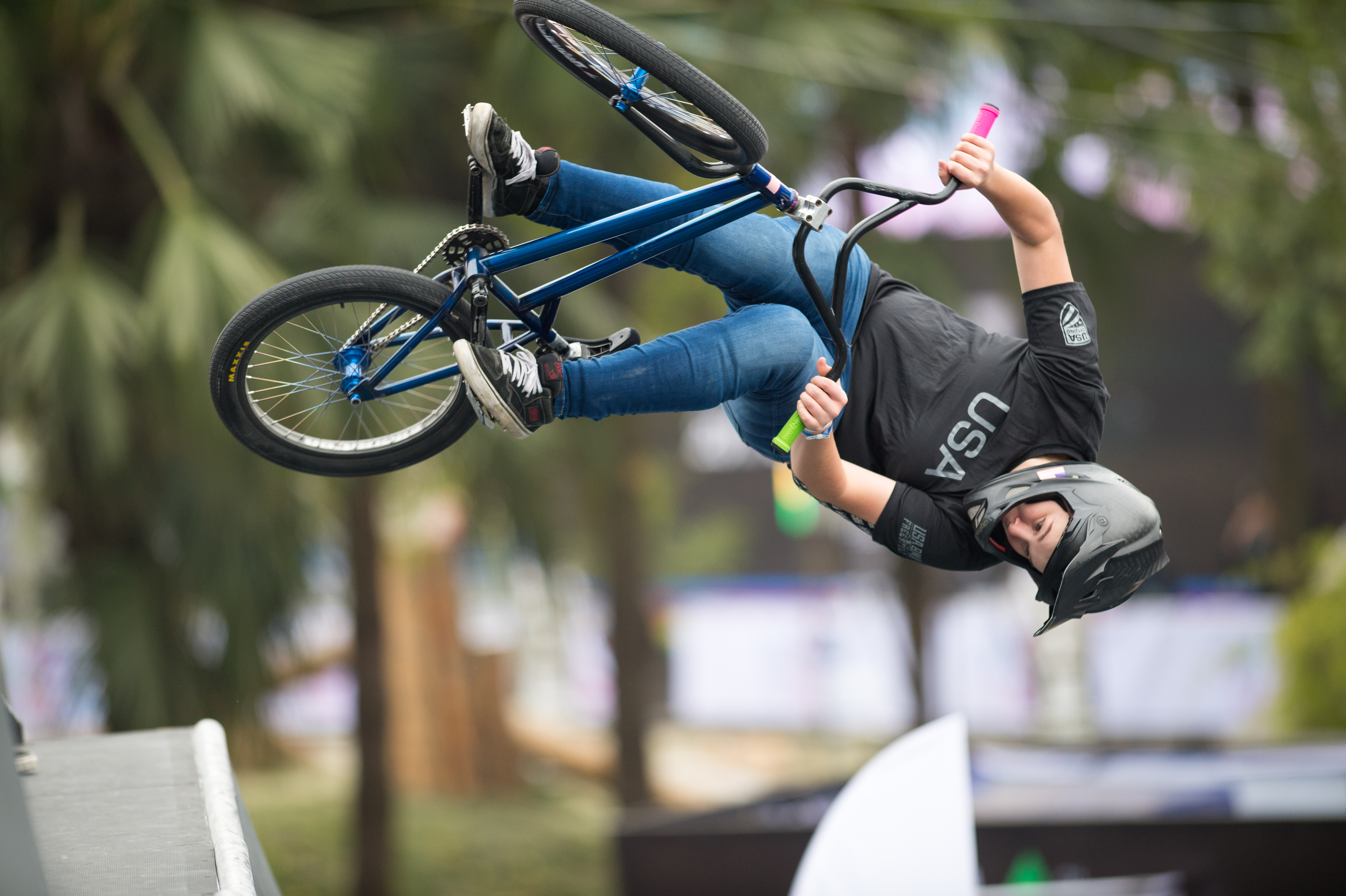
- Roberts in 2017

Personal information
- Born: August 10, 2001 (age 25) South Bend, Indiana, U.S.

Cycling career
- Sport: Cycling
Medal record
Women's BMX
Representing United States
Olympic Games
Silver medal – second place	2020 Tokyo	Freestyle
Urban World Championships
Gold medal – first place	2017 Chengdu	Freestyle Park
Gold medal – first place	2019 Chengdu	Freestyle Park
Gold medal – first place	2021 Montpellier	Freestyle Park
Gold medal – first place	2022 Abu Dhabi	Freestyle Park
Gold medal – first place	2023 Glasgow	Freestyle Park
Gold medal – first place	2024 Abu Dhabi	Freestyle Park
Bronze medal – third place	2018 Chengdu	Freestyle Park
Pan American Games
Gold medal – first place	2019 Lima	Freestyle
Gold medal – first place	2023 Santiago	Freestyle

Hannah Roberts (born August 10, 2001) is an American BMX freestyle cyclist. She is a five-time world champion in the UCI Urban Cycling World Championships and silver medalist in freestyle BMX at the Tokyo 2020 Olympics.

== Early life ==
Roberts was born in South Bend, Indiana. Roberts' mother is Betty Roberts. Roberts grew up in Buchanan, Michigan and graduated from Buchanan High School in 2019.

Roberts began riding BMX at age 9. She entered her first international BMX competition in 2012.

== Career ==
=== Urban World Championships ===
In 2017, Roberts competed in Chengdu, China at the UCI Urban Cycling World Championships where she won gold and became world champion. After earning bronze in 2018, Roberts won her second BMX world title in 2019 and a third world title in 2021. She went on two win two more gold medals in 2022 and 2023, thus becoming a five-time BMX Freestyle Park world champion. As of 2024, no other woman has won more than one world title in this event.

=== 2020 Olympics ===
Roberts became the first American to qualify in BMX freestyle for the 2020 Summer Olympics, the first Olympics the event was included. Going into the event, Roberts was seeded first and was a favorite to win. She had the highest score in the first round with a score of 96.10. For her second run, she needed to improve to a score of 97.50 to win gold, but after a poor landing, she stopped the run and received a silver medal.

=== 2024 Olympics ===
In June 2024 Roberts qualified for her second Olympics by winning Olympic Qualifier Series held in Shanghai and Budapest. She was once again considered as one of the favorites to win gold in BMX Freestyle Park. On the first day of competition in Paris Roberts captured the first place in qualification round and advanced to the final.

During the warmup before the final Roberts collided with Czech Iveta Miculyčová and grabbed her right shoulder. In her first final run she crashed on a front flip and put her foot down on the landing soon after she started the second run. Roberts eventually finished the competition 8th.

== Competitive history ==
All results are sourced from the Union Cycliste Internationale.

As of August 5th, 2024

=== Olympic Games ===
Event	Freestyle Park
(Japan) 2020 Tokyo	Silver
(France) 2024 Paris	8th

=== UCI Cycling World Championships ===
Event	Freestyle Park
(China) 2017 Chengdu	Gold
(China) 2018 Chengdu	Bronze
(China) 2019 Chengdu	Gold
(France) 2021 Montpellier	Gold
(United Arab Emirates) 2022 Abu Dhabi	Gold
(United Kingdom) 2023 Glasgow	Gold
(United Arab Emirates) 2024 Abu Dhabi	Gold

=== UCI BMX Freestyle Park World Cup ===
Season	1	2	3	4	Rank	Points
2022	MON; 4	BRU; 1	GOL; 3		1	2590
2023	DIR; 1	MON; 2	BRU; 2	BAZ; 2	1	2800
2024	ENO; 1	MON —	SHA		5	1000

== Personal life ==
Roberts is openly a member of the LGBT community. In a 2021 interview, she identified as queer. Roberts was once married to a woman, but they separated in 2022; Roberts stated in a 2024 interview that personal difficulties related to the divorce had a negative impact on her performance in athletic events for two years, as administrative responsibilities related to the split were time-consuming: "I was going through a divorce the end of 2022, and it led to a lot of 2023 just dividing certain things. We had dogs and stuff that we had to split, and that was hard. We had other financial things to figure out. And I was dealing with all of that almost every time that I was off the bike. . . . there was a lot less time spent on my bike because I was trying to get everything figured out."
