= Kaede Ozawa =

Japanese BMX freestyle rider

Personal information
- Nationality: Japanese
- Born: 7 September 2007 (age 19) Gifu Prefecture, Japan
- Education: International Pacific University

Sport
- Sport: BMX freestyle
- Event: Park
Medal record
Men's BMX freestyle
Representing Japan
Asian Games
Silver medal – second place	2026 Aichi–Nagoya	Park

Kaede Ozawa (Japanese: 小澤 楓; born 7 September 2007) is a Japanese BMX freestyle rider who competes in the park discipline. He won the silver medal in the men's park event at the 2026 Asian Games in Aichi–Nagoya, Japan, with a score of 90.00 points. He has also won national-level BMX freestyle competitions in Japan and represented the country in international events.

== Career ==
Ozawa was born on 7 September 2007 in Gifu Prefecture, Japan. He began riding BMX in the second grade of elementary school and practised at a large riding area built by his father at their home. He attended Gifu Daiichi High School, where he continued developing as a BMX freestyle rider. In 2019, he won an international junior-level competition, and he later advanced to the elite category of the sport.

Ozawa became a leading competitor in Japan's BMX freestyle park events. At the first round of the Mynavi Japan Cup in Nagoya in April 2024, he won the men's competition with a score of 78.25 points, ahead of Joji Mizogaki. The event brought together leading Japanese riders preparing for the international season.

In September 2024, Ozawa finished second in the men's park event at the second round of the Mynavi Japan Cup in Yokosuka. Because strong winds forced the final to be cancelled, the final standings were determined by the qualifying results. Ozawa placed behind Olympic rider Rim Nakamura.

Ozawa continued competing in the elite category during 2025. At the Japanese National BMX Freestyle Championships in October, he finished second in the men's elite park event with a score of 84.60 points. He advanced to the final of the 2025 UCI BMX Freestyle World Cup in Sakai, Japan, where he finished eighth. The competition was the final round of the season and featured riders from several countries.

Ozawa enrolled at International Pacific University, where he continued to compete while studying. The university listed him among its athletes selected to represent Japan at the 2026 Asian Games. His university profile identifies him as a first-year student in its distance-learning programme in contemporary business administration at the time of the Games.

At the 2026 Asian Games in Aichi and Nagoya, Ozawa competed in the men's BMX freestyle park event. In the final on 27 September, he scored 90.00 points to finish second and win the silver medal. Japan's Rim Nakamura won gold with 96.20 points, giving the country the top two positions in the event. Ozawa's silver medal was also reported by Gifu Shimbun and specialist cycling publication Cyclowired.
