= 2023 UCI BMX Freestyle World Championships =

Cycling world championships

- Venue: Glasgow, Scotland
- Date: 5–12 August 2023
- Events: 4

The 2023 UCI BMX Freestyle World Championships were held in Glasgow, Scotland between 5 and 10 August 2023. Ordinarily held as part of the UCI Urban Cycling World Championships, in this year the world championships in the disciplines of Park and Flatland both form part of the larger 2023 UCI World Cycling Championships. A 2023 UCI Trials World Championships, generally held with the BMX championships as the UCI Urban Cycling World Championships were held separately.

The Freestyle park events were qualification events for the 2024 Summer Olympics.

== Medal summary ==
=== Park ===
Event	Gold	Silver	Bronze
Men's elite	Kieran Reilly; Great Britain	Logan Martin; Australia	Nick Bruce; United States
Women's elite	Hannah Roberts; United States	Sun Sibei; China	Zhou Huimin; China

=== Flatland ===
Event	Gold	Silver	Bronze
Men's elite	Yu Shoji; Japan	Kio Hayakawa; Japan	Matthias Dandois; France
Women's elite	Aude Cassagne; France	Letícia Moda; Brazil	Kirara Nakagawa; Japan

== Results ==
=== Men's Park elite ===
The final took place on 7 August in Glasgow. 24 cyclists took part.

Rank	Rider	Country	Best Score
1st place, gold medalist(s)	Kieran Reilly	Great Britain	95.80
2nd place, silver medalist(s)	Logan Martin	Australia	95.30
3rd place, bronze medalist(s)	Nick Bruce	United States	93.90
4	Rimu Nakamura	Japan	91.87
5	Marin Rantes	Croatia	90.64
6	Jude Jones	Great Britain	90.10
7	Justin Dowell	United States	89.74
8	Daniel Sandoval	United States	89.36
9	José Torres	Argentina	89.20
10	Gustavo Oliveira	Brazil	85.30
11	Jacob Thiem	United States	79.24
12	Jeffrey Whaley	Canada	77.80

Rank	Rider	Country	Best Score
13	Ernests Zēbolds	Latvia	77.20
14	Daniel Dhers	Venezuela	75.50
15	Kaede Ozawa	Japan	74.20
16	Tom Clemens	Germany	73.10
17	Timo Schulze	Germany	71.80
18	James Jones	Great Britain	70.66
19	Joshua Matthews	Australia	66.90
20	Declan Brooks	Great Britain	66.06
21	Bryce Tryon	United States	64.00
22	Garcia Kevin Peraza	Mexico	58.20
23	Shaun Gornall	Great Britain	56.40
24	Anthony Jeanjean	France	36.60

=== Women's Park elite ===
The final took place on 7 August in Glasgow. 12 cyclists took part.

Rank	Rider	Country	Best Score
1st place, gold medalist(s)	Hannah Roberts	United States	91.04
2nd place, silver medalist(s)	Sun Sibei	China	89.10
3rd place, bronze medalist(s)	Zhou Huimin	China	87.90
4	Fan Zihui	China	85.30
5	Zheng Qian	China	84.70
6	Deng Yawen	China	82.30
7	Charlotte Worthington	Great Britain	76.70
8	Queen Saray Villegas	Colombia	73.20
9	Iveta Miculyčová	Czech Republic	72.60
10	Lea Muller Kim	Germany	69.00
11	Sasha Pardoe	Great Britain	63.60
	Macarena Perez Grasset	Chile	DNS

=== Men's Flatland elite ===
The final took place on 10 August in Glasgow. Eight cyclists took part.

Rank	Rider	Country	Score
1st place, gold medalist(s)	Yu Shoji	Japan	94.16
2nd place, silver medalist(s)	Kio Hayakawa	Japan	91.16
3rd place, bronze medalist(s)	Matthias Dandois	France	88.00
4	Jean William Prevost	Canada	85.50
5	Moto Sasaki	Japan	82.46
6	Berkel Sybren Christ. Van	Netherlands	75.90
7	Masato Ito	Japan	72.83
8	Piernavieja Jorge Gomez	Spain	70.16

=== Women's Flatland elite ===
The final took place on 10 August in Glasgow. Eight cyclists took part.

Rank	Rider	Country	Score
1st place, gold medalist(s)	Aude Cassagne	France	87.66
2nd place, silver medalist(s)	Letícia Moda	Brazil	84.5
3rd place, bronze medalist(s)	Kirara Nakagawa	Japan	82.66
4	Sakura Kawaguchi	Japan	81.26
5	Jeanne Seigneur	France	77
6	Panni Thuranszky	Hungary	72
7	Louise Seigneur	France	62.33
8	Veronika Kadar	Hungary	59

== Medal table ==
* Host nation (Great Britain)

Rank	Nation	Gold	Silver	Bronze	Total
1	Japan	1	1	1	3
2	France	1	0	1	2
2	United States	1	0	1	2
4	Great Britain*	1	0	0	1
5	China	0	1	1	2
6	Australia	0	1	0	1
6	Brazil	0	1	0	1
Totals (7 entries)		4	4	4	12
