= Mountain bike trials =

Sport of cycling over an obstacle course

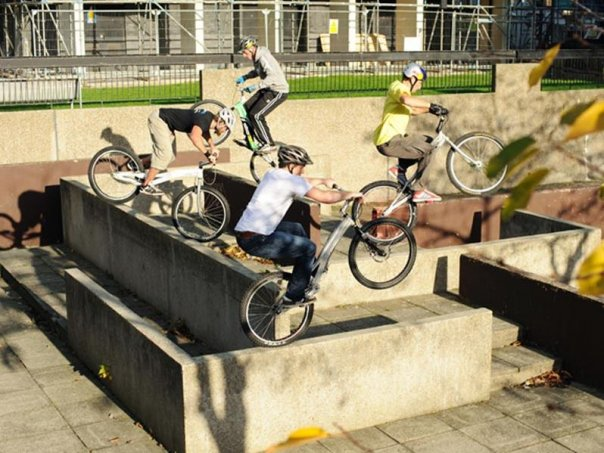
Four riders practicing urban bike trial.

Mountain bike trials, also known as observed trials, is a discipline of mountain biking in which the rider attempts to pass through an obstacle course without setting foot to ground. Derived from motorcycle trials, it originated in Catalonia, Spain as trialsín (from trial sin motor, "motorcycle trials without an engine") and is said to have been invented by Pere Pi, the father of Ot Pi, a world champion motorcycle trials rider. Pi's father had wanted his son to learn motorcycle trials by practicing on an ordinary bicycle.

Trials riding is an extreme test of bicycle handling skills, over many of obstacles, both natural and man-made. It now has a strong – though small – following worldwide, though it is still primarily a European sport. Skills taken from trials riding can be used practically on any bicycle for balance, for example controlled braking and track standing, or balancing on the bike without putting a foot down. Competition trial bikes are characterized by powerful brakes, wide handlebars, lightweight parts, single-speed low gearing, low tire pressures with a thick rear tire, distinctive frame geometry, and usually no seat.

== Rules ==
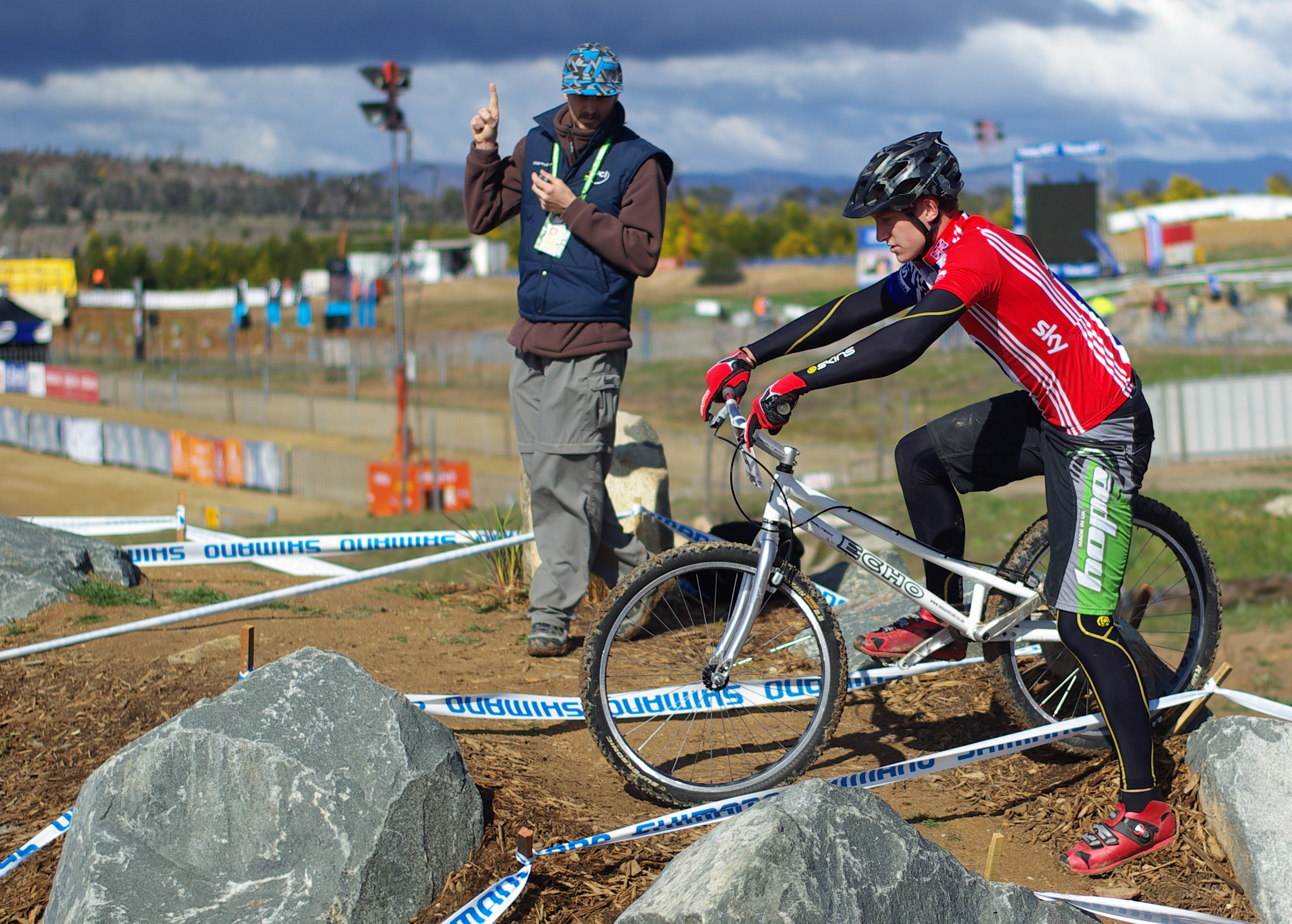
Briton Joe Oakley receives a one-point penalty for "dabbing" the ground with his foot. The official indicates this with a raised finger.

The general principle in a bike trials competition is to ride a number of pre-marked sections (usually two laps of ten sections or three laps of seven sections), the winner being the rider with the fewest points at the end of the competition.

Currently there are two official types of competition rules, enforced by the UCI and BikeTrial International Union.

The maximum number of points that can be obtained in each section is 5, the lowest (and best) score is 0 points or 'clean'. The most common way to gain a point is by putting a foot down within a section; for this reason points are sometimes known as 'dabs'. Certain rules enforce the number of points gained within a section, for example, putting both feet down or a hand will result in 5 points. Exceeding the time limit for the course will either result in 5 points (BIU rules) or an additional point for every 15 seconds over the limit (UCI rules).

=== UCI ===
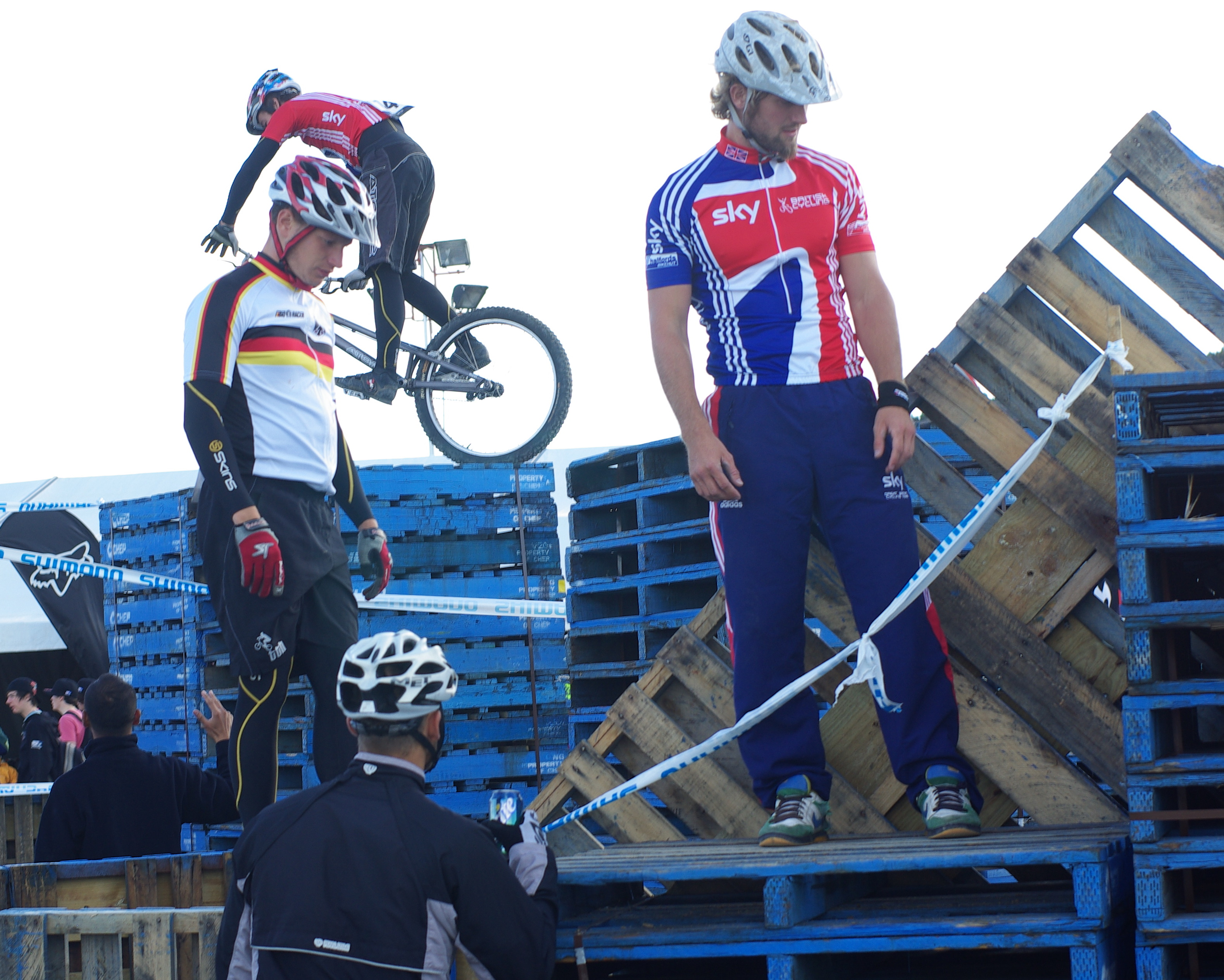
Riders inspecting a section, as permitted under UCI regulations.

Within UCI rules, if any part of the bike except the tires touch any object in the course, a dab will be given. The UCI rules were changed to this format after too many competitions ended in a draw and riders were forced to ride an extra section. UCI rules also allows riders to compete in both mod and stock categories.

When a rider is in a section, neither tire is allowed to cross the side boundary tape even if the wheel is in the air. The rider's hands must remain on the handlebars. Before beginning a section, a rider is allowed to walk through it, and examine all the elements, but must not enter it with their bike.

The UCI Urban Cycling World Championships are held annually and crown a 20-inch and 26-inch wheel trials world champion.

=== BIU ===
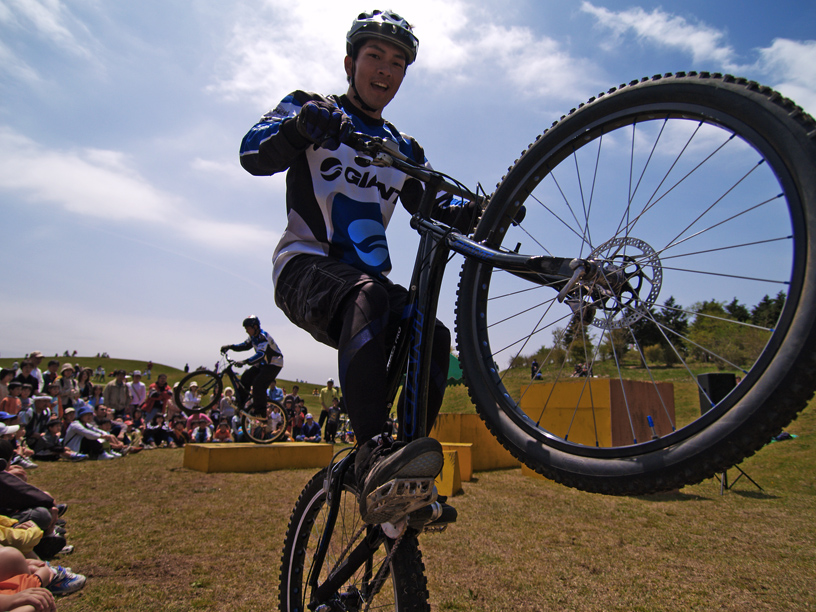
Bicycle trials rider

The rules are unlike UCI scoring and parts of the bike (for example, bash guard or bash ring, cranks and pedals) can rest on an object without resulting in a 'dab'.

=== Interscolar ===
The rules are the same as the "BIU" but only people belonging to a club or school can compete in these, these are for lower level students to learn how to compete.

== Bike design ==
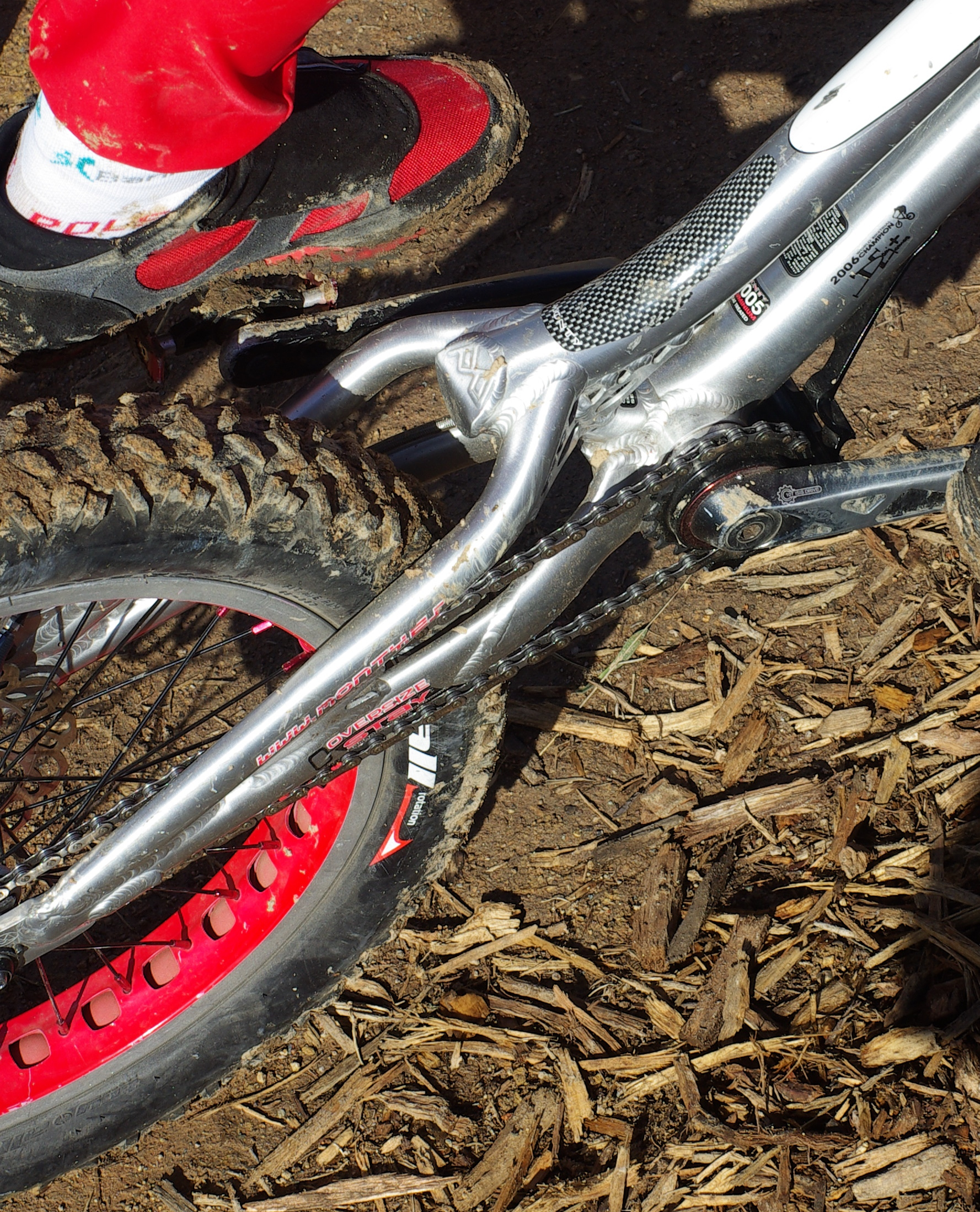
Close-up of the cranks and small chainring on a trials bike

=== Frames ===
Trials bikes are often designed without regard for attaching a seat. Competition riding does not require the rider to sit down and the omission allows for a lighter bike which interferes less with the body movements of the rider. For the same reason most trials frames are as low as possible, often to such a degree that at top dead centre, the pedals are higher than the frame is above the bottom bracket (BB). In terms of geometry, trials frames, especially those biased towards competition, tend to have BB spindles positioned significantly higher than the line between the axles. BB rise is one of the significant dimensions used in describing a trials frame with rises between 30 and 75 mm being common in 26″ frames. Many competition style 24″ frames aim to place the BB at the same height relative to the ground as a 26″ frame and so have a BB rise 25 mm (1″) more than a similar feeling 26″ frame. Street riding biased 24 and 26″ frames tend to have lower BB's than competition frames.

Trials frames will often have holes in the front of the head tube and elsewhere such as the BB shell, the seat tube and the dropouts to reduce frame weight. This feature is not commonly seen in mountain bikes, mostly due to mountain bikes' increased exposure to mud and dust and the attendant maintenance problems having an easy route for dirt to take into the headset and BB particularly will cause. The disc brake mounts on trials frames will be more heavily reinforced than those on normal mountain bikes as trials riding routinely requires much higher brake forces than seen in mountain bike riding, especially forces acting backwards on the rear brake. Unlike virtually all other off-road bike frames in production, trials frames, especially stock frames are sometimes made without disk mounts. Some trials frames have four-bolt mounts specifically for hydraulic rim brakes, as it is still a mildly popular choice for the rear brake in a trials bike. The four-bolt mount is not commonly seen on any bicycle frame other than trials bikes.

Current production trials frames are most commonly made in various aluminium alloys, but frames are available made from steel, titanium, magnesium, and carbon fibre.

=== Brakes ===
==== Rim vs. disk ====
Trials brakes must create more stopping torque than standard bicycle brakes and are set up, especially on the rear, with more emphasis on locking the wheel they act on than bringing the bike to a smooth halt from speed. For larger wheeled trials bikes, brakes that act directly on the rim are more popular, namely hydraulic rim brakes and cable actuated V Brakes, though disk brakes are also used, especially on the front wheel, by most riders. Virtually all competition only riders on 26″ wheeled bikes use hydraulic rim brakes on both wheels, while for 20″ competition the split is more even between rim brakes and disks.

The main reason for the preference for rim brake on the back of 26″ wheeled bikes is that there is significant wind-up between the wheel rim and the hub while hopping on the back wheel thanks to the longer spokes and bigger wheel and disk diameter used compared to a 20″ wheel. This occurs because disk brakes hold the hub still rather than the rim. The effect is noticeable as a springiness in the bike when on the back wheel and this feels less precise and confidence inspiring to many riders than a rim brake, which holds the wheel directly at the rim.

==== Rim grinding ====
To make a rim brake lock the wheel as firmly as possible a number of techniques are used. The most common is where the braking surface of the rim is roughened using an angle grinder. This creates what trials riders refer to as a ground rim. Rim grinds can vary from quite light where the rim surface is very slightly roughened, all the way to a 'harsh' grind, where the rim has deep grooves (Heading for 1 mm deep if very harsh) in it. A grind may be referred to as 'dead' if it has been used a lot and the brake pads have started to polish it back smooth. Depending on the weather conditions and the brake pad compound chosen, different levels of grind are required for peak brake performance. Ground rims give consistent lock and hold in all but the muddiest conditions, making them more popular in wetter climates than smooth rims.

==== Rim tar ====
Other methods of increasing braking power for rim brakes include rubbing a very thin layer of roofing or road tar on the braking surface of a smooth rim. This works by effectively sticking the brake pads to the rim and for this reason, much harder pads than are suitable for ground rims can be used with good results and excellent pad durability compared to ground rims. Since the pads stick to the rim, the brake often doesn't release as cleanly as a ground brake or a disk however.

The main downside to this method is that, similar to a smooth rim, even small amounts of moisture will drastically reduce the stopping performance of this braking setup. Some spray-on products are available to coat rims to give a tar like stopping performance. Generally only riders who live in very dry climates or ride only on dry surfaces in dry weather favour this method of enhancing the brake.

==== Brake boosters ====
Rim brakes are also often enhanced by fitting 'brake boosters'. These are horseshoe-shaped plates that are bolted between the brake pistons (Or arms in the case of V Brakes), forming a bridge over the tIre. This increases the force needed to push the brakes apart, giving a stiffer feel at the brake lever and in many cases better brake bite and hold. In hydraulic rim brakes, this has a second benefit which is to protect the brake line which loops over the tire between the brake pistons from being accidentally hit and broken.

==== Other considerations ====
Street-biased riders tend to choose disk brakes more often. Part of this is that disks are almost invariably better at controlling the speed of a bike while it is rolling, that is they can take more energy per unit time from the rider (i.e., they have more power, which is why they dominate all other off-road cycling disciplines), but most disks will not hold a wheel locked as firmly as a rim brake, making them less desirable for competition trials. Rim brakes set up for trials tend to squeal or howl if they are pulled while the wheel is turning, occasionally leading to trials riders attracting undesirable attention or being considered a nuisance for noise pollution.

UCI regulations only stipulate that the bike must have a working front and rear brake.

=== Wheels ===
Trials bike rims are significantly wider than those used for cross country, downhill and BMX bikes. Wider rims mean that any given tire fitted to the rim will hold a bigger volume of air thanks to the tire beads being held further apart by the rim. This means the tire has a wider contact patch and therefore can be run at lower tire pressure. The change in volume of a tire on a wide rim when landed on a sharp corner will tend to be greater than that of a narrow rim, which again leads to improved pinch puncture resistance, critical for trials as landing on sharp edges is a very common requirement of both competition and street trials. A wider rim also makes it much harder for a tire to roll off the rim when exposed to side loads, again a very common occurrence in trials riding.

The downside to having very wide rims is that trials rims are heavy compared to narrower rims. To save weight trials rims almost always have large holes through them between each spoke hole to save weight. To stop the tube from bulging through the holes when the tire is inflated, a heavy plastic rim strip is used to cover the holes. The pressure in the tube will bulge the rim strip a small amount towards the center of the wheel, but this will not lead to a tube failure.

To increase the resistance of the tires to pinch puncturing, most trials bikes are fitted with thicker walled tires, especially on the rear wheel. These tires are also used by downhill riders for the same reason. The tubes used in a trials bike tend to be similar to those used for downhill riding also.

The hubs used for trials bikes tend to be very similar to those used for cross country mountain biking at the front, though the trials hubs tend to have more cutouts to save weight (Which would fill with mud if used for cross country, potentially making the hub heavier than if it was made from solid metal) and less emphasis on sealing at the bearings as surviving high mileage is not usually a priority with trials hubs.

Rear trials hubs tend to be divided into two main types based on the dropout spacing they are designed for, 135 mm and 116 mm, sometimes referred to as 110 mm, with the remaining 6 mm occupied by snail cams, which are a popular means of tensioning the chain in horizontal dropout frames. Of the shorter hubs, almost all of them are 'screw-on' hubs, where the sprocket or freewheel that is fitted to the hub screws onto the side of the hub. There are some hubs of this length that have a freewheel mechanism built into them, most of which are used mainly in BMX. There are also a small number of hubs with a splined section machined onto the side of the hub where a sprocket can be attached with no freewheel mechanism.

135 mm spaced trials hubs originally were taken from mountain bikes, but modern designs are focused on making room for as many sprockets as possible and often don't have the torque carrying capacity needed to be safe for trials use. Many of them also don't pick up drive quickly enough to give a trials rider the instant pedal response required for precision riding. For comparison some mountain bike hubs have as few as 16 clicks per revolution, or one click every 22.5 degrees rotation. The lowest click count in any trials hub on the market is 48, or one click every 7.5 degrees.

If the hub has no freewheel mechanism built into it, then a front freewheel is required, which screws onto the crank. These were initially taken from BMX or singlespeed/utility bikes and use the same threads as screw-on rear hubs. It was found that most BMX freewheels weren't strong enough for trials use and for this reason trials specific freewheels were designed. Trials freewheels are available with up to 120 clicks per revolution to give excellent drive pickup. Since the torque capacity of the freewheel must be extremely high (Fitted to the crank the freewheel will see the highest torques in the bike drivetrain), instead of making a ratchet with 120 teeth and small ratchet pawls to engage them, the ratchet ring has 40 deep teeth which are less prone to chipping or rounding. These are engaged by 3 ratchet pawls at a time, with 9 in total in the freewheel. Each set of 3 pawls is offset by 1/120 of a revolution from the previous set. This is either achieved by using identical pawls with slight offsets in the machining of the seats for the pawls or by having the pawls in each set of 3 pawls shorter or longer than the other sets of 3.

=== Gear ratios ===
Virtually all trials bikes in current production have one gear. The gear ratio chosen by most riders results in the bike moving approximately the same distance per turn of the pedals regardless of the wheel size. The most popular gear ratios are given below and most riders will choose a rear cog size within 1 tooth of those given below:

18:15 (1.2:1 – the bike rolls 2.49 m (98″) for one complete turn of the cranks) for 26″ bikes.

18:14 (1.286:1 – the bike rolls 2.46 m (97″) for one complete turn of the cranks) for 24″ bikes.

18:12 (1.5:1 – the bike rolls 2.39 m (94″) for one complete turn of the cranks) for 20″ bikes.

Most mountain bikes have several gears lower than are used for trials bikes but most mountain bike gears are higher. The gear ratio chosen for a trials bike is to provide the power and quick acceleration needed to move the bike at the typically low speeds of trials riding.

According to current competition standards there are two classes of trials bike recognized. As the distinguishing characteristic of the classes is the bike's approximate wheel diameter, the classes are known as 20″ and 26″. These specific sizes were adopted from previously available bikes.

=== 20″ – 'Mod Bikes' ===
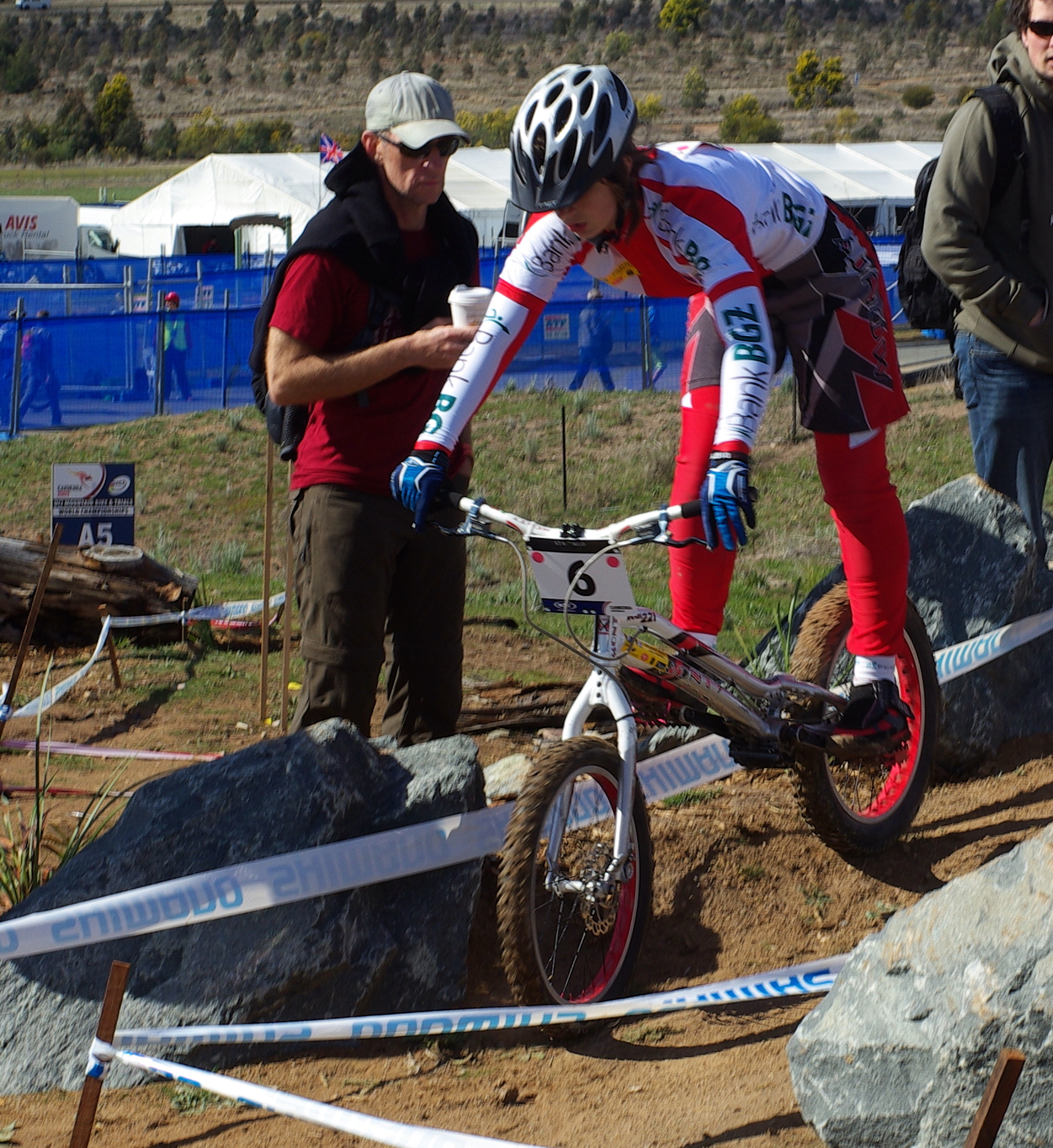
A rider on a 20″ trials bike

The first purpose made and commercially available trials bikes were manufactured by Montesa a mototrials company and were based on the modified bmx bikes that riders had been using. As a result of being based on BMX bikes, the rear dropout spacing is 116mm. These 20″ wheeled trials bikes have become known colloquially as Mod bikes. Some mod bikes have a 19″ rear wheel to make room for a bigger tyre, but the overall tyre diameter is similar regardless of the rim size, so this is mostly important as a compatibility issue for spare parts.

Frame geometry for mod bikes have a high bottom bracket, usually around +80mm, wheelbase around 1010mm and chainstay length of around 350mm.

=== 26″ – 'Stock Bikes' ===
Early mountain bikes were well suited to the trials riding and so a separate class was introduced for them. 'Stock Bikes' used to refer to a 26″ wheeled mountain bike kept in original or 'stock' condition, i.e., not modified like a mod bike. Stock classed bikes were required to have at least six working gears and a seat. Now however, this designation is used to describe any trials bike with 26″ wheels, as current 26″ trials bikes look about as similar to mountain bikes as 20″ trials bikes look like BMXs.

Historically stock bikes all had 135 mm spaced dropouts to take a standard mountain bike rear hub. There is a subcategory of Stock trials bikes, sometimes called 'Modstock Bikes', which have 26″ wheels but have horizontal dropouts spaced at 116 mm, similar to mod bikes. Horizontal dropouts at both spacings are becoming more and more common in stock bikes as they eliminate the need for a chain tensioner, making the bike lighter (The chain is tensioned by moving the wheel backwards in the dropouts; vertical dropouts are designed to hold the wheel in one position only and therefore require a separate means of tensioning the chain to accommodate wear).

Frame geometry for Stock bikes also have a high bottom bracket, around +70mm, wheelbase around 1095mm, and chainstay length around 380mm.

=== 24″ – 'Street trials bikes' ===
These bikes have 24″ wheels and usually have horizontal dropouts, spaced at 135mm or 116 mm similar to 26″ bikes. They are not traditionally used to compete in competitions and were originally designed to suit riders with a more "street" style. (e.g., spins, manuals, bunnyhops). An increasing number of 24″ wheeled frames have become available designed for competition style riding rather than street riding. These offer a good compromise between the length of a 26″ frame for bridging between obstacles and the ease with which a 20″ bike can be lifted to the back wheel.

Compared to stock and mod frame geometry, street trials bikes have a slightly higher bottom bracket, shorter wheelbase and shorter chainstays to assist the rider with spins, manuals and bunnyhops while still providing assistance with back wheel moves. Geometry may vary between different models of street trails bikes, but typically the bottom bracket height is around +15mm, wheelbase around 990-1000mm, and chainstay length around 360.

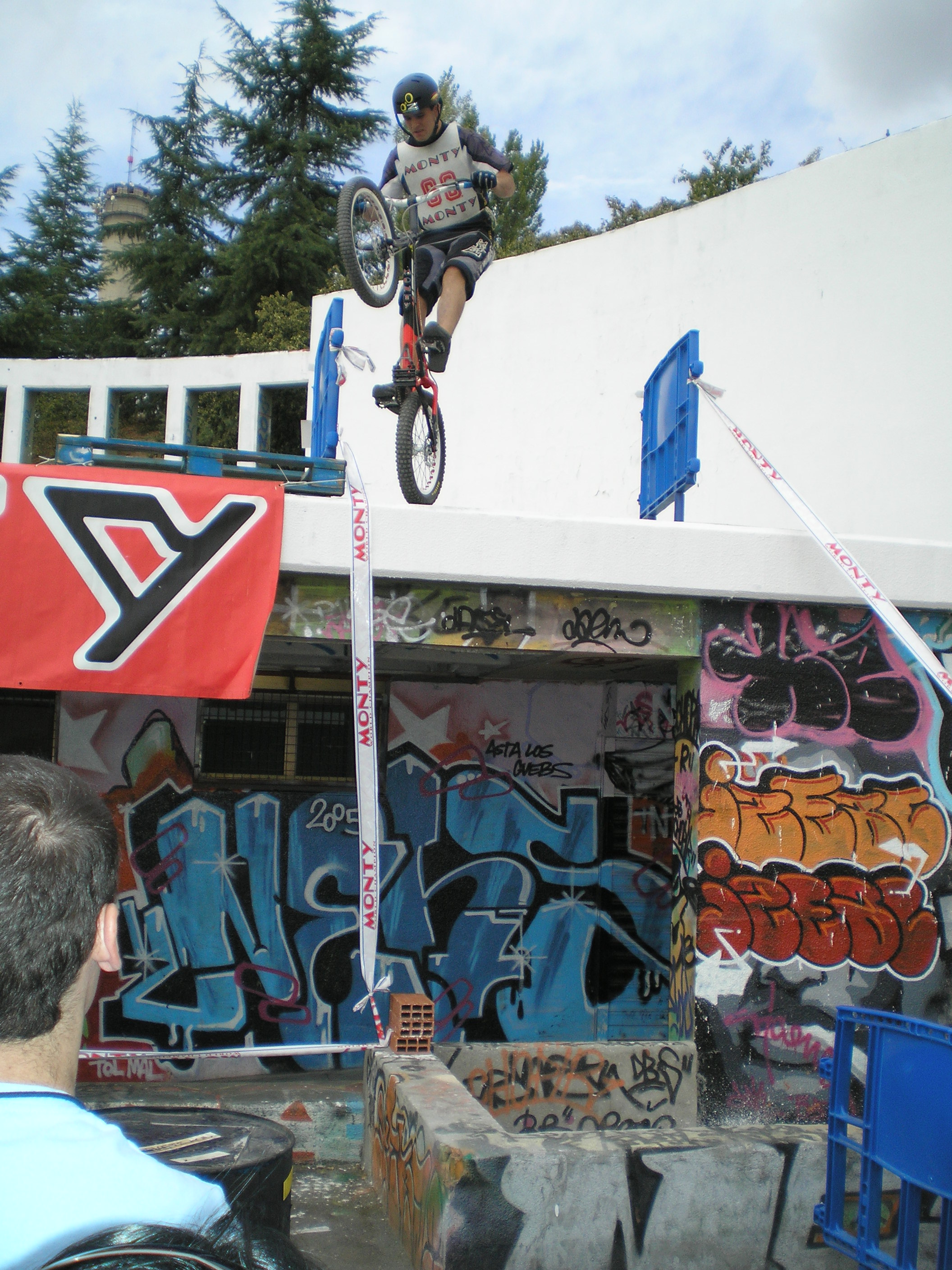
Bicycle trial rider about to jump (in Spain)

== Course design ==
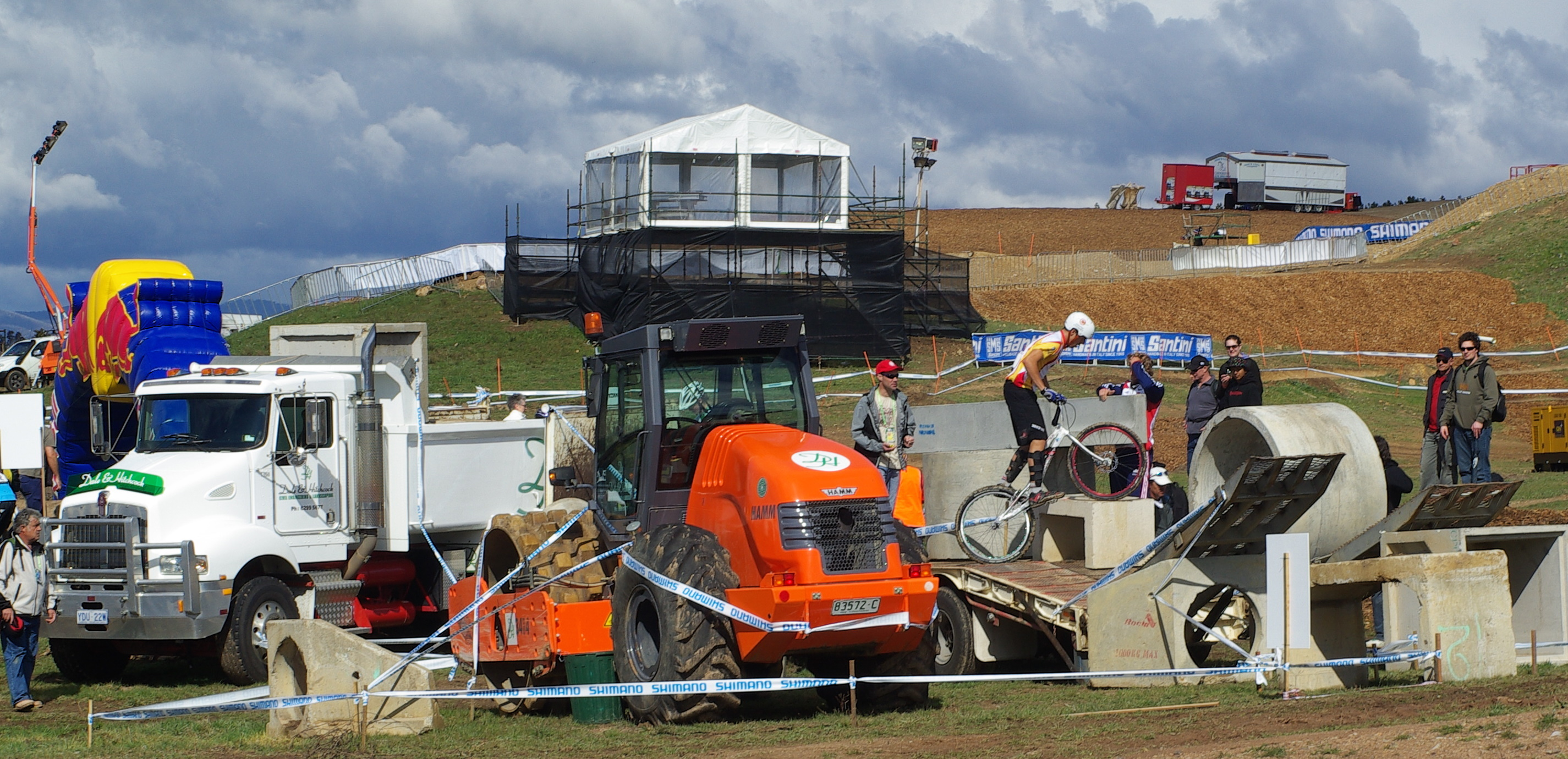
A highly artificial course consisting of trucks and earthmoving equipment, at the 2009 world championships

UCI regulations stipulate that a course consist of at least 14 sections per course, including repeated sections. At most two sections can be composed entirely of artificial elements. Both sides of the course are marked with plastic tape, and there must be a clear stretch of 3 metres prior to the finish line, in order to prevent riders jumping over the line from an obstacle. Maximum obstacle jump heights are specified, from 0.80 to 1.80 metres depending on category. The sections, each approximately 60 m in length, are laid out on a circuit to allow riders to ride from one section to the next, but whether the sections have to be completed in order depends on the individual competition.

== Street trials ==
Street trials, or freestyle bike trials, is a non-competitive variant, using features found in the urban environment. It is the trials equivalent of street skateboarding or street freestyle BMX. More fluid than competitive trials riding, it encompasses the same skills: very precise control of the bike, through jumps and balancing on very narrow obstacles. A distinct difference between traditional competition style riding and street trials is the effort to eliminate correction hops, inspired by Ryan Leech's "manifesto" riding style.

== See also ==
- Bunny hop (cycling)
- Dirt jumping
- Unicycle trials
- Glossary of cycling
