= 2022 UCI Urban Cycling World Championships =

Cycling world championships

- Venue: Abu Dhabi, United Arab Emirates
- Date: 9–13 November 2022
- Events: 10

The 2022 UCI Urban Cycling World Championships were the fifth edition of the UCI Urban Cycling World Championships, and are held from 9 to 13 November 2021 in Abu Dhabi, United Arab Emirates.

The 2022 championships comprised events in freestyle BMX and trials.

== Medal summary ==
=== Freestyle BMX ===
==== Flatland ====
Event	Gold	Silver	Bronze
Men Elite	Moto Sasaki; Japan	Masato Ito; Japan	Kio Hayakawa; Japan
Women Elite	Aude Cassagne; France	Julia Preuss; Germany	Kirara Nakagawa; Japan

==== Park ====
Event	Gold	Silver	Bronze
Men Elite	Rim Nakamura; Japan	Justin Dowell; United States	Anthony Jeanjean; France
Women Elite	Hannah Roberts; United States	Nikita Ducarroz; Switzerland	Iveta Miculyčová; Czech Republic

=== Trials ===
Event	Gold	Silver	Bronze
Teams	Spain; Nil Benítez; Daniel Cegarra; Daniel Barón; Borja Conejos; Vera Barón	France; Vincent Hermance; Robin Berchiatti; Louis Grillon; Pierre Chasseuil; Nina Vabre	Germany; Oliver Widmann; Dominik Oswald; Jan Welte; Nina Reichenbach; Lennart Höchster
Men Elite 20"	Eloi Palau; Spain	Alejandro Montalvo; Spain	Borja Conejos; Spain
Men Elite 26"	Jack Carthy; Great Britain	Daniel Barón; Spain	Oliver Widmann; Germany
Women Elite	Nina Reichenbach; Germany	Vera Barón; Spain	Hilda Andersson; Sweden
Men Junior 20"	Robin Berchiatti; Switzerland	Nil Benítez; Spain	Niilo Stenvall; Finland
Men Junior 26"	Diego Garrues; Spain	Daniel Cegarra; Spain	Titouan Corre; France

== Medal table ==
* Host nation (United Arab Emirates)

Rank	Nation	Gold	Silver	Bronze	Total
1	Spain	3	5	1	9
2	Japan	2	1	2	5
3	France	1	1	2	4
3	Germany	1	1	2	4
5	Switzerland	1	1	0	2
5	United States	1	1	0	2
7	Great Britain	1	0	0	1
8	Czech Republic	0	0	1	1
8	Finland	0	0	1	1
8	Sweden	0	0	1	1
Totals (10 entries)		10	10	10	30

== See also ==
- 2022 UCI BMX World Championships
- 2022 UCI Mountain Bike World Championships
- 2021 UCI Urban Cycling World Championships
