= UCI Urban Cycling World Championships =

World cycling event

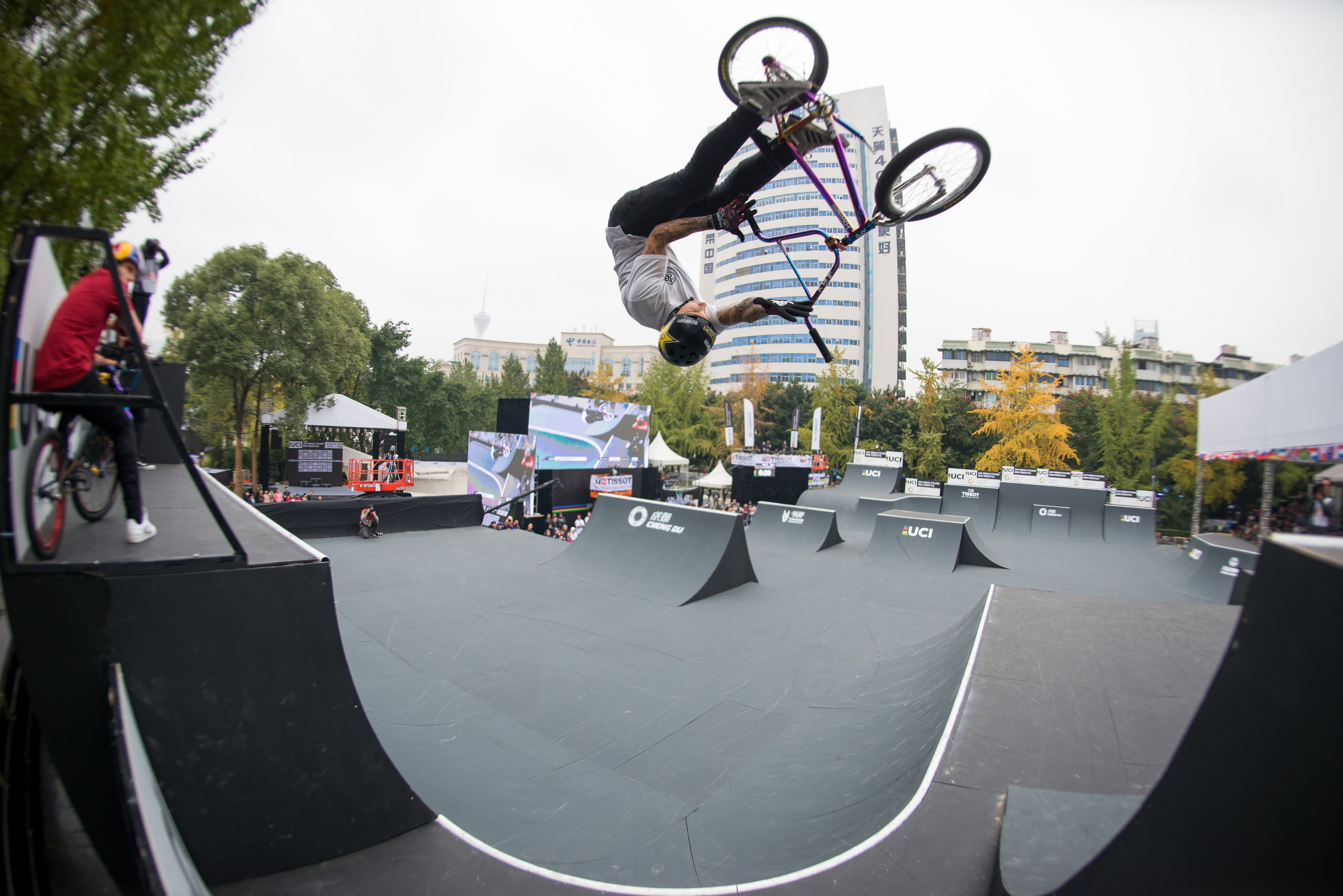
Logan Martin competing in BMX freestyle at the first UCI Urban Cycling World Championships in Chengdu in 2017

The UCI Urban Cycling World Championships are the world championship events for freestyle BMX, cross-country eliminator, and trials. They are organised by the Union Cycliste Internationale (UCI), the governing body of world cycling.

== History ==
The first three finishers in each discipline are awarded gold, silver, and bronze medals. The winner of each discipline is also entitled to wear the rainbow jersey in events of that discipline until the following year's World Championships.

The UCI Urban Cycling World Championships were held for the first time in 2017. The UCI World Championships in cross-country eliminator and trials were previously held as part of the UCI Mountain Bike & Trials World Championships. Freestyle BMX received UCI World Cup status in 2016 and the UCI did not previously crown a world champion in the discipline.

The first three editions of the Urban Cycling World Championships were held in China.

== Venues ==
Year	Country	City
2017	China	Chengdu
2018	China	Chengdu
2019	China	Chengdu
2021	France	Montpellier
2022	United Arab Emirates	Abu Dhabi
2023	United Kingdom	Glasgow
2024	United Arab Emirates	Abu Dhabi
2025	Saudi Arabia	Riyadh
2026	Saudi Arabia	Riyadh

== Events ==
Event	2017	2018	2019	2021	2022
Men's freestyle park BMX	•	•	•	•	•
Men's freestyle flatland BMX				•	•
Men's cross-country eliminator	•	•			
Men's trials, 20 inch	•	•	•		•
Men's trials, 26 inch	•	•	•		•
Event	2017	2018	2019	2021	2022
Women's freestyle park BMX	•	•	•	•	•
Women's freestyle flatland BMX				•	•
Women's cross-country eliminator	•	•			
Women's trials	•	•	•		•

== Medal table ==
Rank	Nation	Gold	Silver	Bronze	Total
1	Spain (ESP)	17	16	10	43
2	France (FRA)	11	12	14	37
3	United States (USA)	8	4	6	18
4	Great Britain (GBR)	8	2	7	17
5	Germany (GER)	6	8	8	22
6	Japan (JPN)	6	7	5	18
7	Australia (AUS)	4	2	3	9
8	Austria (AUT)	3	0	1	4
9	Switzerland (SUI)	2	3	1	6
10	China (CHN)	1	3	3	7
11	Czech Republic (CZE)	1	1	1	3
12	Sweden (SWE)	0	2	1	3
13	Canada (CAN)	0	1	1	2
13	Hungary (HUN)	0	1	1	2
15	Argentina (ARG)	0	1	0	1
15	Brazil (BRA)	0	1	0	1
15	Chile (CHI)	0	1	0	1
15	Costa Rica (CRC)	0	1	0	1
15	Ukraine (UKR)	0	1	0	1
20	Finland (FIN)	0	0	3	3
21	Belgium (BEL)	0	0	1	1
21	Croatia (CRO)	0	0	1	1
Totals (22 entries)		67	67	67	201

== UCI Urban Cycling World Champions ==
- Men's cross-country eliminator
- Women's cross-country eliminator
- Men's trials, 20 inch
- Men's trials, 26 inch
- Women's trials
