= UCI Urban Cycling World Championships – Men's freestyle BMX =

The men's freestyle BMX is an event at the annual UCI Urban Cycling World Championships.

== Medalists ==
=== Freestyle Park ===
Championships	Gold	Silver	Bronze
2017 Chengdu	Logan Martin (AUS)	Alex Coleborn (GBR)	Colton Walker (USA)
2018 Chengdu	Justin Dowell (USA)	Kenneth Tencio (CRC)	Brandon Loupos (AUS)
2019 Chengdu	Brandon Loupos (AUS)	Logan Martin (AUS)	Nick Bruce (USA)
2021 Montpellier	Logan Martin (AUS)	Daniel Sandoval (USA)	Marin Ranteš (CRO)
2022 Abu Dhabi	Rim Nakamura (JPN)	Justin Dowell (USA)	Anthony Jeanjean (FRA)
2023 Glasgow	Kieran Reilly (GBR)	Logan Martin (AUS)	Nick Bruce (USA)
2024 Abu Dhabi	Logan Martin (AUS)	José Torres (ARG)	Justin Dowell (USA)
2025 Riyadh	Anthony Jeanjean (FRA)	Marcus Christopher (USA)	Logan Martin (AUS)

=== Freestyle Flatland ===
Championships	Gold	Silver	Bronze
2019 Chengdu	Dominik Nekolný (CZE)	Matthias Dandois (FRA)	Moto Sasaki (JPN)
2021 Montpellier	Matthias Dandois (FRA)	Moto Sasaki (JPN)	Alexandre Jumelin (FRA)
2022 Abu Dhabi	Moto Sasaki (JPN)	Masato Ito (JPN)	Kio Hayakawa (JPN)
2023 Glasgow	Yu Shoji (JPN)	Kio Hayakawa (JPN)	Matthias Dandois (FRA)
2024 Abu Dhabi	Matthias Dandois (FRA)	Moto Sasaki (JPN)	Jean William Prevost (CAN)
2025 Riyadh	Yu Katagiri (JPN)	Jean William Prevost (CAN)	Dustyn Alt (GER)

=== Medals by country ===
Rank	Nation	Gold	Silver	Bronze	Total
1	Japan	4	4	2	10
2	Australia	4	2	2	8
3	France	3	1	3	7
4	United States	1	3	4	8
5	Great Britain	1	1	0	2
6	Czech Republic	1	0	0	1
7	Canada	0	1	1	2
8	Argentina	0	1	0	1
8	Costa Rica	0	1	0	1
10	Croatia	0	0	1	1
10	Germany	0	0	1	1
Totals (11 entries)		14	14	14	42
