= Cycling at the 2020 Summer Olympics – Men's BMX freestyle =

Olympic cycling event

Men's BMX freestyle at the Games of the XXXII Olympiad
- Olympic BMX cycling
- Venue: Ariake Urban Sports Park
- Date: 31 July – 1 August 2021
- Competitors: 9 from 8 nations

Medalists
1st place, gold medalist(s)		Logan Martin	Australia
2nd place, silver medalist(s)		Daniel Dhers	Venezuela
3rd place, bronze medalist(s)		Declan Brooks	Great Britain

The men's BMX freestyle event at the 2020 Summer Olympics took place on 31 July and 1 August 2021 at the Ariake Urban Sports Park. 9 cyclists from 8 nations competed.

== Background ==
This was the debut appearance of the event, with freestyle BMX added to the programme for the first time (BMX racing was added in 2008).

The reigning (2021) World Champion is Logan Martin of Australia, who was also the 2017 winner and 2019 silver medalist.

A preview by Olympics.com noted the favourites as Brandon Loupos of Australia (the 2019 World Champion), Daniel Dhers of Venezuela, and Rim Nakamura of Japan. Australia had hoped to have both Martin and Loupos compete. The final rankings, however, put the United States as the #1-ranked nation. This meant that the United States was the only nation able to send two cyclists in the event; Australia, as the #2-ranked nation, could send only one. Further, Loupos was seriously injured during the 2021 World Championship less than two months before the Games, which would have kept him from competing in any case. Martin was selected as Australia's only men's BMX freestyle rider.

The United States selected Justin Dowell (2018 World Champion) and Nick Bruce (2019 bronze medalist); the Americans finished the 2021 World Championship with 3 cyclists in the top 5 places (Bruce 5th, Dowell 4th, and Daniel Sandoval taking silver).

== Qualification ==
A National Olympic Committee (NOC) could enter up to 2 qualified cyclists in the BMX freestyle. Quota places are allocated to the NOC, which selects the cyclists. There were 9 quota places available, allocated as follows:

- UCI nation ranking (6 places): Top NOC earns 2 places. NOCs ranked 2nd to 5th each earn 1 place.
- 2019 World Championships (2 places): The top 2 NOCs at the 2019 UCI Urban Cycling World Championships, which have not yet earned any quota places, each earn 1 place.
- Host place (1 place): Host nation Japan was guaranteed 1 place.

== Competition format ==
The competition is a two-round tournament, with a seeding round and a final. Each round has the cyclists all do two runs. The runs are 60 seconds long. Five judges give scores between 0.00 and 99.99 based on the difficulty and execution of the rider's run; the scores are averaged for a total run score. In the seeding round, the rider's two run scores are averaged to give a total seeding score. These seeding scores are used to determine the start order of the cyclists in the final, providing a knowledge advantage to the later riders. In the final, only the better score of the two runs counts.

== Schedule ==
The event took place over two consecutive days.

H	Heats	QF	Quarter-Finals	SF	Semi-Finals	F	Finals

BMX, mountain biking and road cycling
Event↓/Date →	24 July	25 July	26 July	27 July	28 July	29 July	30 July	31 Jul	1 Aug
BMX Freestyle
Men's freestyle								H	F

== Results ==
=== Seeding ===
The seeding phase determines the start order for the final. The best ranked rider from the seeding will start last in the final.

Rank	Cyclist	Nation	Run 1	Run 2	Average	Notes
1	Logan Martin	Australia	91.90	90.04	90.97	
2	Rim Nakamura	Japan	86.20	89.14	87.67	
3	Daniel Dhers	Venezuela	84.20	86.00	85.10	
4	Anthony Jeanjean	France	83.00	86.30	84.65	
5	Irek Rizaev	ROC	81.20	81.30	81.25	
6	Kenneth Tencio	Costa Rica	75.20	84.40	79.80	
7	Declan Brooks	Great Britain	74.30	79.20	76.75	
8	Justin Dowell	United States	69.80	80.60	75.20	
9	Nick Bruce	United States	6.60	1.00	3.80	

=== Final ===
Rank	Cyclist	Nation	Run 1	Run 2	Best	Notes
1st place, gold medalist(s)	Logan Martin	Australia	93.30	41.40	93.30	
2nd place, silver medalist(s)	Daniel Dhers	Venezuela	90.10	92.05	92.05	
3rd place, bronze medalist(s)	Declan Brooks	Great Britain	89.40	90.80	90.80	
4	Kenneth Tencio	Costa Rica	84.20	90.50	90.50	
5	Rim Nakamura	Japan	72.20	85.10	85.10	
6	Irek Rizaev	ROC	36.60	82.40	82.40	
7	Anthony Jeanjean	France	78.20	51.20	78.20	
8	Justin Dowell	United States	44.60	31.60	44.60	
9	Nick Bruce	United States	24.60	DNS	24.60	

== See also ==
- Cycling at the 2020 Summer Olympics – Women's BMX freestyle
- Cycling at the 2020 Summer Olympics – Men's BMX racing
- Skateboarding at the 2020 Summer Olympics – Men's park
- 2021 UCI Urban Cycling World Championships
