= Gustavo Oliveira =

Brazilian cyclist (born 2002)

Personal information
- Full name: Gustavo Batista de Oliveira
- Nickname: Bala Loka
- Nationality: Brazilian
- Born: 25 September 2002 (age 24) Carapicuíba, São Paulo, Brazil
- Height: 1.67 m (5 ft 6 in)

Sport
- Sport: BMX freestyle
- Event: Park
Medal record
Men's BMX freestyle
Representing Brazil
Pan American Games
Bronze medal – third place	2023 Santiago	Freestyle park
Pan American Championships
Bronze medal – third place	2022 Lima	Freestyle park
Bronze medal – third place	2023 Asunción	Freestyle park
South American Games
Silver medal – second place	2026 Santa Fe	Freestyle park
Bronze medal – third place	2022 Asunción	Freestyle park

Gustavo Batista de Oliveira (born 25 September 2002), known as Gustavo Bala Loka, is a Brazilian freestyle cyclist who represents Brazil in BMX. Finished 6th at the 2024 Summer Olympics.

== Career ==
Gustavo was born in Cohab 2, on the outskirts of Carapicuíba. He started at the age of seven. On the track called Caracas Trail, in Carapicuíba, Gustavo Balaloka took his first rides on the BMX dirt jump, a sport practiced on dirt ramps. After watching a championship in Carapicuíba, the boy asked his father for a BMX bike. At the time, 16-inch bicycles were not manufactured in Brazil, and importing was something outside the family's financial reality. Therefore, they needed to use creativity and improvise. Gustavo's father went to a junkyard in Osasco, found a bicycle, took BMX parts and put them on the bike that wasn't for BMX, so his son could practice the sport. His nickname, "Crazy Bullet (Bala Loka)" came when he was learning and taking risks. When pedaling at full speed to try to jump a ramp, Gustavo lost control, miscalculated and went straight over. He woke up later, scared, lying on the floor, with his father throwing water in his face. His friends said he pedaled like a bullet, like a madman, and the combination gave him the name that accompanies him to this day.

In 2016, he was called up by the Brazilian Cycling Confederation (CBC) to participate in a World Championship for the first time.

In 2017, at the age of 15, he won a stage of the BMX Freestyle World Cup in China.

The BMX park modality was at the Olympic Games for the first time in Tokyo 2020. In this edition, Brazil was unable to classify representatives in both the men's and women's categories. Bala Loka, which began to emerge after 2020, began focusing on Paris 2024.

=== 2021-24 ===
At the 2022 South American Games held in Asunción, Paraguay, he won a bronze medal in BMX Freestyle.

At the 2022 Pan-American BMX Park Freestyle Cycling Championship, held in November, in Lima, Peru, Gustavo obtained the bronze medal. Argentine Jose Torres won the title. The silver medal went to Peruvian Job Montañez.

At the beginning of 2023, he obtained a bronze medal at the Pan-American BMX Championships, behind only Venezuelan Daniel Dhers, silver at the Tokyo 2020 Olympic Games, and Costa Rican Kenneth Tencio, runner-up in the 2018 UCI Urban Cycling World Championships. In July 2023, he secured Brazil's first Top 10 in a World Cup stage.

In August 2023, being in 12th position in the international ranking of the BMX Freestyle Park, Gustavo participated in the 2023 UCI BMX Freestyle World Championships that took place in Glasgow, Scotland, where he finished in tenth place.

At the 2023 Pan American Games held in Santiago, Chile, he won a bronze medal in BMX Freestyle.

In December 2023, he was nominated by the COB (Brazilian Olympic Committee), as the best in the country in the BMX Freestyle Cycling category, during the 2023 Prêmio Brasil Olímpico.

=== 2024 Summer Olympics ===
In 2024, Oliveira participated in two stages of the Olympic Classification Series, between May 16 and 19, in Shanghai, and between June 20 and 23 in Budapest. In the first stage, in Shanghai, he finished in 8th place. In the second stage, in Budapest, he came in 4th place, and combining the two results, he got a place for the 2024 Summer Olympics, in Paris.

At the 2024 Summer Olympics, being the first Brazilian in history to compete in men's BMX Freestyle at the Olympics, he qualified for the final in 8th place. In the final, he was in fourth place until the end of the first round. He finished in a historic 6th place overall.

== Competitive history ==
All results are sourced from the Union Cycliste Internationale.

As of August 8th, 2024

=== Olympic Games ===
Event	Freestyle Park
(France) 2024 Paris	6th

=== UCI Cycling World Championships ===
Event	Freestyle Park
(China) 2017 Chengdu	42nd
(China) 2018 Chengdu	—
(China) 2019 Chengdu	—
(France) 2021 Montpellier	—
(United Arab Emirates) 2022 Abu Dhabi	—
(United Kingdom) 2023 Glasgow	10th

=== UCI BMX Freestyle Park World Cup ===
Season	1	2	3	4	Rank	Points
2022	MON; 32	BRU —	GOL —		53	23
2023	DIR —	MON; 13	BRU; 9	BAZ; 9	9	1390
2024	ENO; 11	MON —	SHA		21	430
