= Pat Casey (BMX) =

American BMX rider (1993–2023)

Personal information
- Nationality: American
- Born: December 26, 1993 Riverside, California, U.S.
- Died: June 6, 2023 (aged 29) Ramona, California, U.S.
- Occupation: Professional BMX athlete

Sport
- Country: United States
- Sport: Freestyle BMX, Dirt jumping
- Event: X Games
Medal record
Men's BMX
Representing United States
World Championships
Gold medal – first place	2011 FISE Montpellier	Park
Silver medal – second place	2012 FISE Costa Rica	Park
Bronze medal – third place	X Games 2012	Park
Silver medal – second place	X Games Brazil 2013	Park
Gold medal – first place	X Games California 2021	Dirt
Silver medal – second place	X Games California 2021	Park
Silver medal – second place	X Games California 2022	Mega Park

Pat Casey (December 26, 1993 – June 6, 2023) was an American athlete who competed in cycling in freestyle BMX. He won five medals at the X Games.

== Career ==
Pat Casey was born on December 26, 1993, in Riverside, California. He turned professional at age 16. Casey is known for being the first rider to successfully perform a decade backflip at a competition in 2011 (a trick where the rider spins their body around the handlebars a full 360 degrees while performing a backflip).

Casey won multiple medals at the FISE: gold in Montellier 2011 and silver on Costa Rica 2012.

For X Games, he won five medals: silver at the X Games Brazil 2013 in park, bronze at the X Games 2012 in park, gold at the X Games California 2021 in dirt, silver in the X Games California 2021 in park, and silver at the X Games California 2022 in mega park.

He was the host of the park and dirt competitions at the X Games California 2021.

In 2013 he won the Red Bull Dreamline title.

== Private life ==
Casey married his wife Chase in August 2013. He had two children, Reid and Taytum, with whom he shared most of his trips and adventures.

== Death ==
On June 6, 2023, Casey died while practicing motocross at Axell Hodges Slayground Motocross Park in San Diego when his motorcycle fell onto him as he attempted a jump. He was 29 years old. Paramedics spent an hour trying to revive Casey until he was declared dead. He left behind a wife and two children.

== See also ==
- Daniel Franks (BMX rider)
- Chad Degroot
- James Brown (BMX rider)
- Daniel Sandoval (BMX rider)
- Anthony Jeanjean

== Awards ==
- 2023 : Our BMX Number One Rider Award (NORA) / Transition Rider of the Year
