= Justin Dowell =

American freestyle BMX cyclist

Personal information
- Born: January 5, 2000 (age 26) Virginia Beach, Virginia, U.S.
- Height: 5 ft 11 in (180 cm)

Cycling career
- Sport: Cycling
- Discipline: Freestyle BMX
- Role: Rider
Medal record
Men's freestyle BMX
Representing United States
World Championships
Gold medal – first place	2018 Chengdu	Freestyle Park
Silver medal – second place	2022 Abu Dhabi	Freestyle Park
Bronze medal – third place	2024 Abu Dhabi	Freestyle Park
Pan American Games
Bronze medal – third place	2019 Lima	BMX Freestyle

Justin Dowell (born January 5, 2000) is an American freestyle BMX cyclist who has represented his nation at numerous global events including the Olympic Games, and won medals at multiple World Championships.

== Career ==
From Virginia Beach, Dowell is known for a trick move called The Twix which is a mix of a tail whip and a bar at the same time. He won the freestyle park event at the 2018 UCI Urban Cycling World Championships. In 2019, he obtained a bronze medal at the Pan American Games. He won silver in Abu Dhabi at the 2022 UCI Urban Cycling World Championships. Dowell qualified to represent United States at the 2020 Summer Olympics, one of the 9 competitors, representing 8 nations, to qualify. Dowell finished in 8th in the Olympic final after he put down a foot on his landing of a 540 over a box jump in the first run and crashed while landing a trick during the second run.

In June 2024, Dowell qualified again for the Olympics after finishing forth in Olympic Qualifier Series. He placed forth in the qualification round with 89.07 average score. In the final he had a flawless first run that included his signature 360 Twix and earned 88.35 enough for fifth provisional place. Dowell started his second run with a no-handed 540 but sat up after realizing he couldn’t better his first run and he finished 7th overall.

In December 2024, he won bronze at the 2024 UCI Urban Cycling World Championships in Abu Dhabi.

He won the gold medal in the BMX Park event at the 2025 summer X Games Salt Lake City ahead of compatriot Marcus Christopher and Rim Nakamura of Japan.

== Competitive history ==
All results are sourced from the Union Cycliste Internationale.

As of August 7th, 2024

=== Olympic Games ===
Event	Freestyle Park
(Japan) 2020 Tokyo	8th
(France) 2024 Paris	7th

=== UCI Cycling World Championships ===
Event	Freestyle Park
(China) 2017 Chengdu	8th
(China) 2018 Chengdu	Gold
(China) 2019 Chengdu	4th
(France) 2021 Montpellier	4th
(United Arab Emirates) 2022 Abu Dhabi	Silver
(United Kingdom) 2023 Glasgow	7th

=== UCI BMX Freestyle Park World Cup ===
Season	1	2	3	4	Rank	Points
2022	MON; 7	BRU; 11	GOL; 5		5	1770
2023	DIR; 10	MON; 29	BRU; 5	BAZ; 26	13	1245
2024	ENO; 28	MON —	SHA		47	27
