= Charlotte Worthington =

British BMX rider (born 1996)

Charlotte Worthington MBE
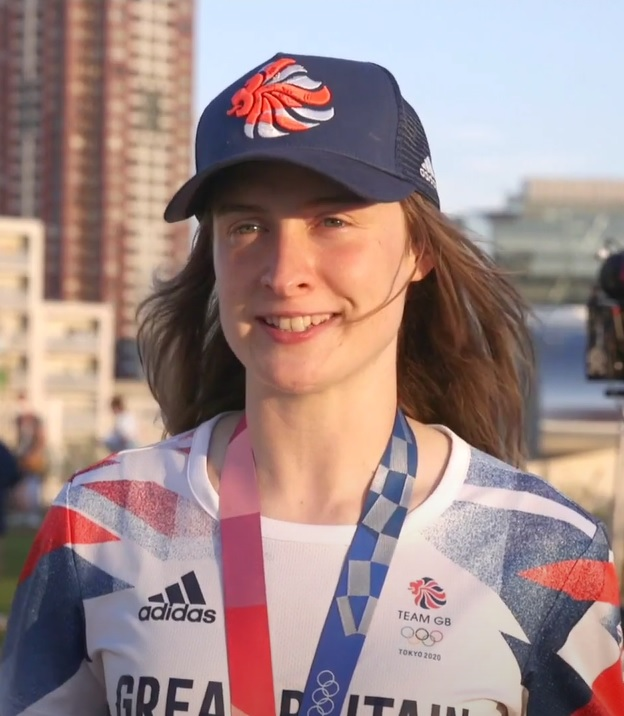
- Worthington in 2021

Personal information
- Born: 26 June 1996 (age 30) Manchester, England

Sport
- Country: Great Britain
- Sport: Freestyle BMX, Dirt jumping
Medal record
Women's BMX
Representing Great Britain
Olympic Games
Gold medal – first place	2020 Tokyo	BMX freestyle
World Championships
Bronze medal – third place	2019 Chengdu	Freestyle Park
Bronze medal – third place	2021 Montpelier	Freestyle Park
European Championships
Gold medal – first place	2019 Caddenazzo	Freestyle Park

Charlotte Worthington (born 26 June 1996) is a British cyclist and Olympic gold medallist, who competes internationally in Freestyle BMX.

== Biography ==
Worthington was born in 1996, and she took up BMX seriously at the age of 20. She worked full-time as a chef at a Mexican restaurant near Chorlton for three years, before Freestyle BMX was added to the Olympics in 2017.

Worthington was accepted on to the Great Britain Cycling Team programme in Freestyle Park, and 2019 saw her win the inaugural British and European titles, before she became the first ever British woman to win a world medal in the discipline, taking bronze at the UCI Urban Cycling World Championships in Chengdu behind Hannah Roberts of the US and the Chilean rider Macarena Perez Grasset.

Worthington was chosen to be part of the UK's 26 strong cycling squad for the postponed 2020 Tokyo Olympics, where she won gold at the Cycling BMX Freestyle park final. On her second run she became the first woman in history to land a 360-degree backflip in competition.

Worthington was appointed Member of the Order of the British Empire (MBE) in the 2022 New Year Honours for services to BMX racing.

In June 2021 she won bronze in Women's BMX Park at the 2021 UCI Urban Cycling World Championships in Montpellier, again behind Hannah Roberts with Nikita Ducarroz in silver.

She competed at the 2024 Paris Olympics on 31 July 2024, without qualifying for the final and finishing 11th. She admitted making mistakes during her two qualification runs.

Worthington lives and trains full-time in Corby, Northamptonshire, which is home to 'Adrenaline Alley’ skate park. She also trains at the Asylum skate park near Nottingham.

== Competitive history ==
All results are sourced from the Union Cycliste Internationale.

As of August 5th, 2024

=== Olympic Games ===
Event	Freestyle Park
(Japan) 2020 Tokyo	Gold
(France) 2024 Paris	11th

=== UCI Cycling World Championships ===
Event	Freestyle Park
(China) 2018 Chengdu	DNS
(China) 2019 Chengdu	Bronze
(France) 2021 Montpellier	Bronze
(United Arab Emirates) 2022 Abu Dhabi	5th
(United Kingdom) 2023 Glasgow	7th

=== UCI BMX Freestyle Park World Cup ===
Season	1	2	3	4	Rank	Points
2022	MON; 7	BRU; 3	GOL; 12		3	1830
2023	DIR; 6	MON —	BRU —	BAZ; 9	20	670
2024	ENO; 4	MON —	SHA		10	770
