= Nikita Ducarroz =

Swiss bicycle motocross rider (born 1996)

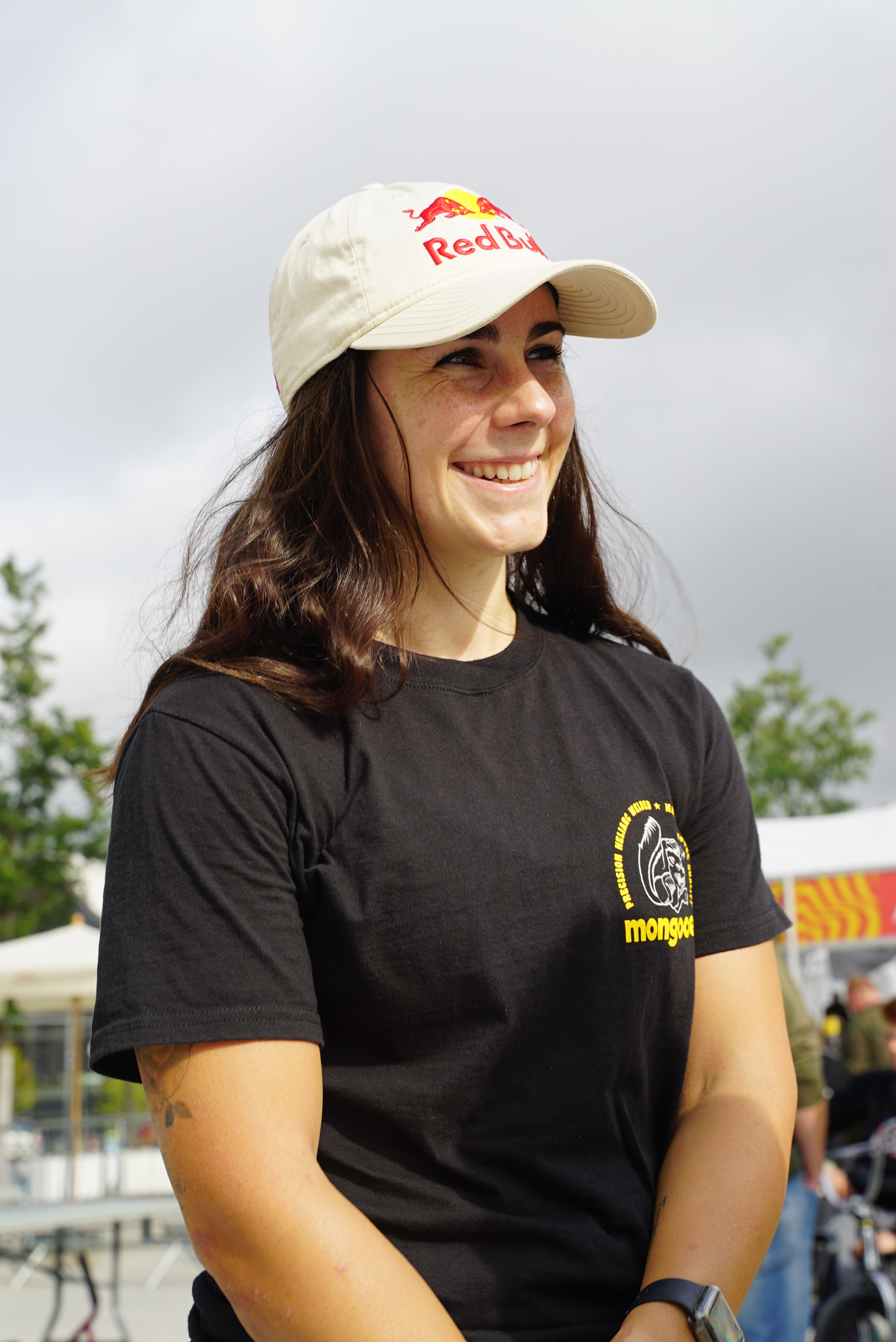
- Ducarroz in 2021

Personal information
- Born: 12 August 1996 (age 30) Nice, France
- Height: 5 ft 4 in (163 cm)

Cycling career
- Sport: Cycling

Major wins
- Simple Session 2020; Vans Pro Cup 2018
Medal record
Women's BMX
Representing Switzerland
Olympic Games
Bronze medal – third place	2020 Tokyo	Freestyle Park
World Championships
Silver medal – second place	2021 Montpellier	Freestyle Park
Silver medal – second place	2022 Abu Dhabi	Freestyle Park
European Championships
Gold medal – first place	2021 Moscow	Freestyle Park
Bronze medal – third place	2024 Cadenazzo	Freestyle Park

Nikita Ducarroz (born 12 August 1996) is a Swiss Freestyle BMX Olympic bronze medalist.

== Early life ==
Born in Nice, France to a Swiss father and an American mother of Assyrian and Sicilian descent, she grew up in Glen Ellen, California. At the age of 11, she began suffering from crippling anxiety which forced her to quit playing association football and attend online school. Her mother wanted her to pursue another sport. Through YouTube, Ducarroz found BMX.

== Career ==
In 2019, she finished fifth at the UCI Urban Cycling World Championships, fourth at the UCI Freestyle BMX World Cup and then won the 2020 BMX Simple Session in Tallinn, Estonia. During the COVID-19 pandemic, Ducarroz was in lockdown at the Daniel Dhers Action Sports Complex training facility in Holly Springs, North Carolina.

She won the bronze medal at the 2020 Tokyo Olympics in 2021. She won the silver medal at the 2021 UCI Urban Cycling World Championships in the Freestyle BMX, and again in 2022.

She competed at the 2024 Paris Olympics on 31 July 2024, without qualifying for the final and finishing 10th.

== Competitive history ==
All results are sourced from the Union Cycliste Internationale.

As of August 5th, 2024

=== Olympic Games ===
Event	Freestyle Park
(Japan) 2020 Tokyo	Bronze
(France) 2024 Paris	10th

=== UCI Cycling World Championships ===
Event	Freestyle Park
(China) 2017 Chengdu	17th
(China) 2018 Chengdu	6th
(China) 2019 Chengdu	5th
(France) 2021 Montpellier	Silver
(United Arab Emirates) 2022 Abu Dhabi	Silver
(United Kingdom) 2023 Glasgow	13th

=== UCI BMX Freestyle Park World Cup ===
Season	1	2	3	4	Rank	Points
2022	MON; 3	BRU; 4	GOL; 7		2	2210
2023	DIR; 9	MON; 11	BRU; 14	BAZ; 7	4	1720
2024	ENO; 6	MON —	SHA		13	670
