= Marin Ranteš =

Croatian BMX rider (born 1995)

Personal information
- Born: 9 August 1995 (age 31) Varaždin, Croatia

Cycling career
- Sport: Cycling
- Discipline: Freestyle BMX
- Role: Rider
Medal record
Men's BMX
Representing Croatia
Urban World Championships
Bronze medal – third place	2021 Montpellier	Freestyle Park
European Championships
Silver medal – second place	2019 Cadenazzo	Freestyle Park
	2025 Eindhoven	Freestyle Park
Bronze medal – third place	2022 Munich	Freestyle Park

Marin Ranteš (born August 9, 1995) is a Croatian BMX cyclist in the freestyle discipline. He is a bronze medalist of 2021 Urban Cycling World Championships.

== Career ==
Ranteš took part in several sports as a youngster and eventually focused on BMX riding. His parents drove him to Zagreb on weekends, where the country's only indoor skate park was located, to help him train better.

In 2017, Ranteš took part in the inaugural Urban Cycling World Championships, finishing 16th. The following year, he achieved two podium finishes in the UCI BMX Freestyle World Cup and won the overall ranking. He attributed this success to training with Daniel Dhers. The following year he became European silver medalist.

After the forced break from competition due to the COVID-19 pandemic, he won bronze medals at the 2021 Urban Cycling World Championships in Montpellier and the 2022 European Championships in Munich. He also advanced to the finals of the World Championships in 2022 and 2023. In his home country, he won all national championships from 2019 to 2023.

=== 2024 Olympics ===
In 2024, Ranteš participated in two stages of the Olympic Classification Series, between May 16 and 19, in Shanghai, and between June 20 and 23 in Budapest. In the first stage he finished in 5th place. In the second stage, in Budapest, he came in 6th place, and combining the two results, he got a place for the 2024 Summer Olympics, in Paris, becoming the first Croatian cyclist to qualify in BMX freestyle.

In the qualification round Ranteš placed ninth provisionally after the first run. He then crashed in the second run and failed to advance to the final finishing 11th.

== Competitive history ==
All results are sourced from the Union Cycliste Internationale.

As of August 9th, 2024

=== Olympic Games ===
Event	Freestyle Park
(France) 2024 Paris	11th

=== UCI Cycling World Championships ===
Event	Freestyle Park
(China) 2017 Chengdu	16th
(China) 2018 Chengdu	44th
(China) 2019 Chengdu	32nd
(France) 2021 Montpellier	Bronze
(United Arab Emirates) 2022 Abu Dhabi	8th
(United Kingdom) 2023 Glasgow	5th

=== UCI BMX Freestyle Park World Cup ===
Season	1	2	3	4	Rank	Points
2022	MON; 14	BRU —	GOL; 16		21	540
2023	DIR; 13	MON —	BRU; 16	BAZ; 4	11	1350
2024	ENO; 5	MON —	SHA		12	720
