= Rim Nakamura =

Japanese BMX rider (born 2002)

Personal information
- Born: 9 February 2002 (age 24) Kyoto, Japan

Cycling career
- Sport: Cycling
- Discipline: Freestyle BMX
- Role: Rider
Medal record
Men's BMX
Representing Japan
Asian Games
Gold medal – first place	2026 Aichi-Nagoya	Freestyle Park
Urban World Championships
Gold medal – first place	2022 Abu Dhabi	Freestyle Park
X Games
Gold medal – first place	2025 Osaka	BMX park
Silver medal – second place	2019 Minneapolis	BMX park
Silver medal – second place	2024 Chiba	BMX park
Bronze medal – third place	2025 Salt Lake City	BMX park
Bronze medal – third place	2026 Chiba	BMX park

Rim Nakamura (中村 輪夢, Nakamura Rimu; born 9 February 2002) is a Japanese freestyle BMX rider.

== Early life ==
Nakamura is the son of BMX rider Tatsuji Nakamura, who runs a bicycle shop in Kyoto, Japan. Nakamura was named "Rim" by his father after the English word for the rim of a bicycle wheel, spelled using the Japanese characters for "wheel" and "dream." The same character for "wheel" is also used as the character for "rings" as in the Olympic rings, implying a dream of competing in the Olympics. Nakamura began riding BMX bikes at the age of three and entered his first competition at age five.

== Career ==
In 2019, he won a 2nd Place: X Games Minneapolis – BMX Park. The same year, he won the overall fise 2019 UCI BMX Freestyle Park World Cup.

He qualified to represent Japan at the 2020 Summer Olympics and he finished 5th despite placing second in the seeding round. Three years later Nakamura again qualified for the 2024 Summer Olympics. He scored 90.35 to go into provisional third position after the first final run. He improved to 90.89 in the second run and ultimately matched fifth place.

He is the world champion of freestyle park of the 2022 UCI Urban Cycling World Championships.

== Competitive history ==
All results are sourced from the Union Cycliste Internationale.

As of August 8th, 2024

=== Olympic Games ===
Event	Freestyle Park
(Japan) 2020 Tokyo	5th
(France) 2024 Paris	5th

=== UCI Cycling World Championships ===
Event	Freestyle Park
(China) 2017 Chengdu	7th
(China) 2018 Chengdu	17th
(China) 2019 Chengdu	5th
(France) 2021 Montpellier	7th
(United Arab Emirates) 2022 Abu Dhabi	Gold
(United Kingdom) 2023 Glasgow	4th

=== UCI BMX Freestyle Park World Cup ===
Season	1	2	3	4	Rank	Points
2022	MON; 1	BRU —	GOL; 3		4	1820
2023	DIR; 12	MON; 6	BRU; 2	BAZ; 11	5	2390
2024	ENO; 4	MON —	SHA		9	770
