= Felix Prangenberg =

German BMX rider (born 1998)

Personal information
- Born: 25 May 1998 (age 28) Germany
- Occupation: Professional BMX Athlete

Sport
- Country: Germany
- Sport: Freestyle BMX
- Event(s): Flatland BMX, best trick
Medal record
Men's BMX
Representing Germany
World Championships
Silver medal – second place	2021 X Games	Freestyle park BMX

Felix Prangenberg (born 25 May 1998) is a German BMX rider who won silver medal in BMX Street at the 2019 X Games in Shanghai. Including the gold (Real BMX Video) and silver (BMX Street) UCI BMX World Championships at the X Games near San Diego and won the bronze medal in the 2021 men's race. He competed in world championships.
