= Cycling at the 2023 European Games – Men's park =

Men's park at the 2023 European Games
- Venue: Krzeszowice BMX Park
- Dates: 21–22 June
- Competitors: 29 from 18 nations
- Winning points: 92.33

Medalists
gold medal	Kieran Reilly	Great Britain
silver medal	Anthony Jeanjean	France
bronze medal	Declan Brooks	Great Britain

The men's BMX freestyle – Park event at the 2023 European Games took place on 21 and 22 June 2023 at the Krzeszowice Skate Park. The event will feature 30 cyclists representing 18 nations.

== Competition format ==
The competition consists of a qualification and a final medal round, within which each competitor does two runs. In the seeding, an average is taken of both runs to place cyclists. In the final, the highest scoring single run win.

== Results ==
=== Qualification ===
The qualification was started on 21 June at 15:25.

Rank	Heat	Start order	Rider	Nation	Run 1	Run 2	Average	Notes
1	5	30	Anthony Jeanjean	France	86.66	83.66	85.16	Q
2	3	18	Marin Ranteš	Croatia	85.00	76.00	80.50	Q
3	4	24	Kieran Reilly	Great Britain	80.16	80.33	80.25	Q
4	3	13	Zoltán Újváry	Hungary	79.50	80.16	79.83	Q
5	4	20	Tom van den Boogaard	Netherlands	77.33	79.83	78.58	Q
6	5	26	Declan Brooks	Great Britain	79.40	77.33	78.37	Q
7	5	29	Ernests Zēbolds	Latvia	79.00	76.00	77.50	Q
8	5	28	Istvan Caillet	France	76.33	77.50	76.91	Q
9	2	10	Tomáš Beran	Czech Republic	73.50	77.83	75.66	Q
10	1	2	Zoltán Kempf	Hungary	71.66	77.66	74.66	Q
11	3	17	Levi Weidmann	Netherlands	77.33	71.00	74.16	Q
12	3	15	Jaka Remec	Slovenia	73.83	70.83	72.33	Q
13	4	22	Yurii Illiushchenko	Ukraine	60.33	83.16	71.75	
14	4	19	Paul Thölen	Germany	74.40	68.66	71.53	
15	2	7	Tomáš Tohol	Slovakia	70.00	72.16	71.08	
16	2	8	Tomass Grīnbergs	Latvia	72.00	68.66	70.33	
17	5	27	Timo Schulze	Germany	57.16	78.60	67.88	
18	4	21	Piotr Leszczyński	Poland	72.16	62.00	67.08	
19	1	5	Matej Žan	Slovenia	68.66	63.00	65.83	
20	1	3	Martin Habada	Czech Republic	66.33	64.33	65.33	
21	3	14	Alessandro Barbero	Italy	67.33	61.66	64.50	
22	5	25	Ryan Henderson	Ireland	61.33	63.00	62.16	
23	1	1	Patryk Teul	Poland	62.33	55.00	58.66	
24	2	9	Pol Díaz	Spain	57.33	58.00	57.66	
25	2	11	Elia Benetton	Italy	51.00	26.33	38.66	
26	1	4	Martynas Lagauskas	Lithuania	37.66	38.00	37.83	
27	1	6	Georgios Ntavoutian	Greece	30.33	36.00	33.16	
28	2	12	Kristen Põder	Estonia	30.66	32.66	31.66	
29	4	23	Adrián Miko	Slovakia	22.66	DNS	11.33	
	3	16	Deividas Budkovas	Lithuania	Did not start			

=== Final ===
The final was started on 22 June at 16:45.

Rank	Heat	Start order	Rider	Nation	Run 1	Run 2	Best
1st place, gold medalist(s)	2	10	Kieran Reilly	Great Britain	88.96	92.33	92.33
2nd place, silver medalist(s)	2	12	Anthony Jeanjean	France	53.33	90.80	90.80
3rd place, bronze medalist(s)	2	7	Declan Brooks	Great Britain	87.40	78.56	87.40
4	1	6	Ernests Zēbolds	Latvia	38.83	84.50	84.50
5	2	11	Marin Ranteš	Croatia	36.50	83.06	83.06
6	1	3	Zoltán Kempf	Hungary	77.66	81.33	81.33
7	1	4	Tomáš Beran	Czech Republic	75.06	36.66	75.06
8	2	9	Zoltán Újváry	Hungary	74.06	72.76	74.06
9	1	2	Levi Weidmann	Netherlands	72.66	52.16	72.66
10	1	1	Jaka Remec	Slovenia	66.66	70.16	70.16
11	1	5	Istvan Caillet	France	68.66	44.06	68.66
12	2	8	Tom van den Boogaard	Netherlands	61.33	12.76	61.33
