= Anthony Jeanjean =

French cyclist (born 1998)

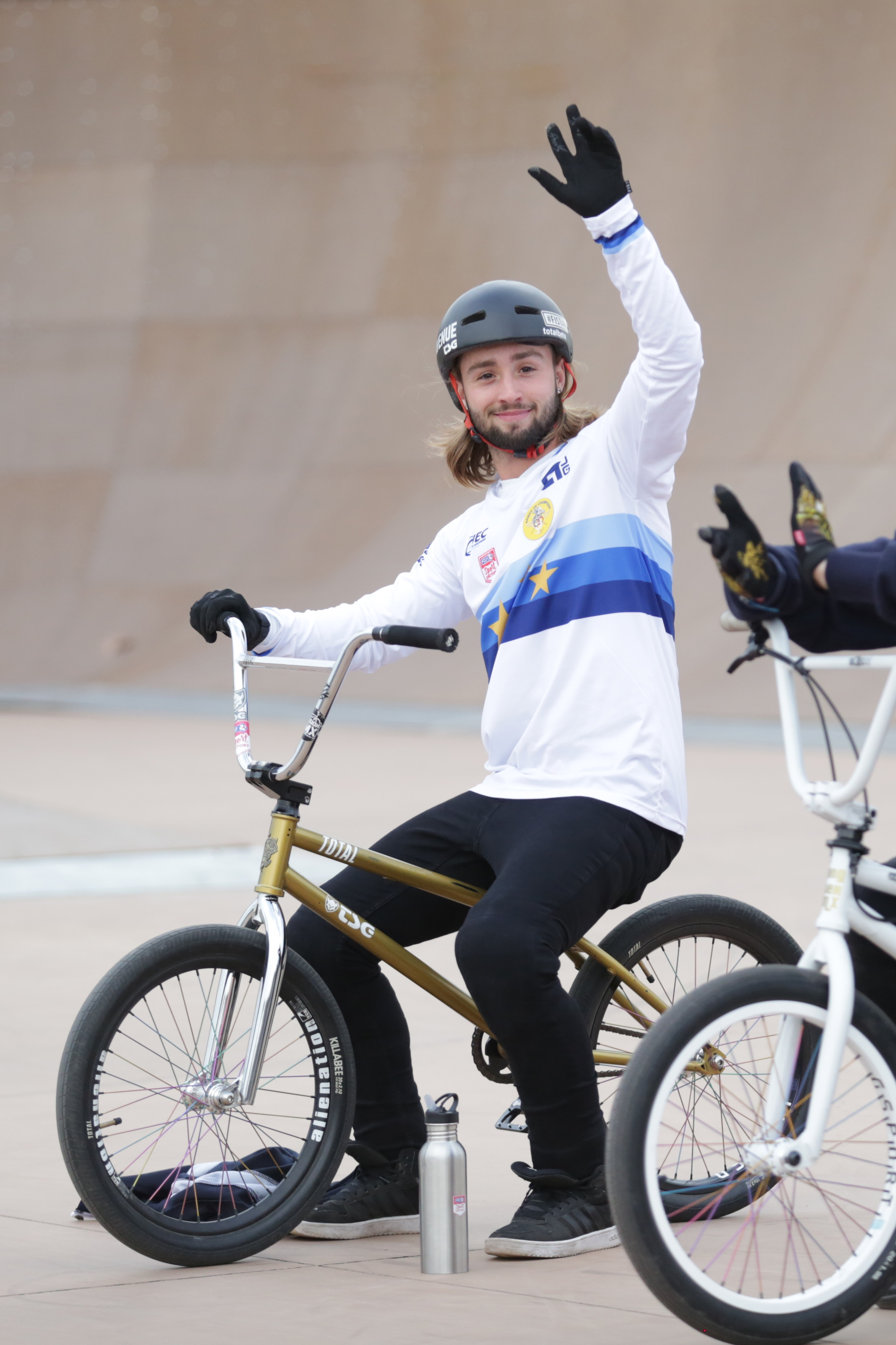
- Jeanjean in 2020

Personal information
- Full name: Anthony Jeanjean-Jones
- Born: 13 June 1998 (age 28) Béziers, France

Sport
- Country: France
- Sport: Freestyle BMX, Dirt jumping
Medal record
Men's freestyle BMX
Representing France
Olympic Games
Bronze medal – third place	2024 Paris	BMX freestyle
World Championships
Gold medal – first place	2025 Riyadh	Freestyle Park
Bronze medal – third place	2022 Abu Dhabi	Freestyle Park
European Games
Silver medal – second place	2023 Kraków-Małopolska	Freestyle Park
European Championships
Gold medal – first place	2019 Cadenazzo	Freestyle Park
Gold medal – first place	2021 Moscow	Freestyle Park
Gold medal – first place	2022 Munich	Freestyle Park
Silver medal – second place	2023 Krzeszowice	Freestyle Park
Silver medal – second place	2024 Cadenazzo	Freestyle Park

Anthony Jeanjean (born 13 May 1998) is a French cyclist who competes in the Freestyle BMX. He is the reigning world champion having won the gold medal at the UCI Urban Cycling World Championships in 2025, and was a bronze medalist at the 2024 Paris Olympics.

== Career ==
Jeanjean began riding BMX in Montpellier, aged 10. He won the inaugural European freestyle BMX Championship as well as French national BMX freestyle gold in 2020. He again became the French national champion at the event held at the Olympic Park in Montpellier in October 2022. In November 2022 he won the bronze medal at the 2022 UCI Urban Cycling World Championships in the Freestyle BMX held in Abu Dhabi.

In June 2021, he was selected for the French team to compete at the delayed 2020 Summer Games. He placed forth in the seeding round. He scored 78.20 in the first final run and placed fifth provisionally, but he couldn't improve in the second run and was overtaken by two riders to finish seventh overall.

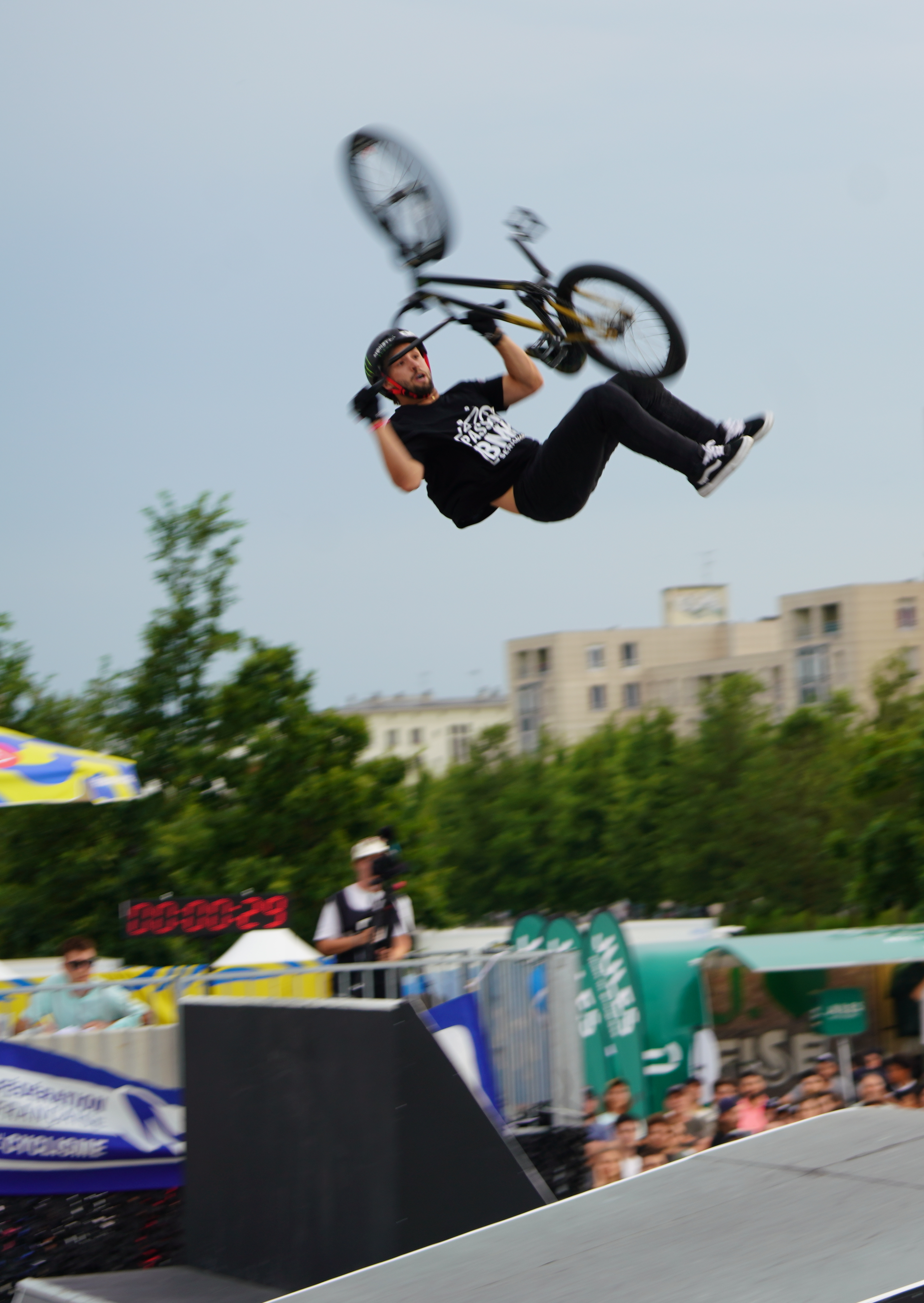
Jeanjean competing in 2023

Jeanjean qualified for the 2024 Summer Olympics via host quota. He advanced to the final with the fifth result among 12 competitors. In the first run he made an early mistake scoring 3.22 which was the lowest score of the event. In the second run Jeanjean performed a double backflip to take provisional second place with a score of 93.76 and was later overtaken by Great Britain's Kieran Reilly who scored 93.91 on his attempt.

In November 2025, Jeanjean won the gold medal in the freestyle park at the 2025 UCI Urban Cycling World Championships in Riyadh, Saudi Arabia, scoring 94.4 for his second run, having fallen in his first.

== Competitive history ==
All results are sourced from the Union Cycliste Internationale.

As of August 7th, 2024

=== Olympic Games ===
Event	Freestyle Park
(Japan) 2020 Tokyo	7th
(France) 2024 Paris	Bronze

=== UCI Cycling World Championships ===
Event	Freestyle Park
(China) 2017 Chengdu	9th
(China) 2018 Chengdu	13th
(China) 2019 Chengdu	11th
(France) 2021 Montpellier	16th
(United Arab Emirates) 2022 Abu Dhabi	Bronze
(United Kingdom) 2023 Glasgow	24th

=== UCI BMX Freestyle Park World Cup ===
Season	1	2	3	4	Rank	Points
2022	MON; 3	BRU; 1	GOL; 2		2	2720
2023	DIR; 18	MON; 2	BRU; 1	BAZ; 3	3	2890
2024	ENO; 1	MON; 1	SHA		1	2000
