= Nick Bruce =

American BMX cyclist

Personal information
- Born: May 16, 1992 (age 34)

Cycling career
- Sport: Cycling
- Discipline: Freestyle BMX
- Role: Rider
Medal record
Men's freestyle BMX
Representing United States
World Championships
Bronze medal – third place	2019 Chengdu	Freestyle park BMX

Nick Bruce (born May 16, 1992) is an American Freestyle BMX cyclist.

From Youngstown, Ohio, Bruce is best known for landing the first flair tailwhip to tailwhip back (flair windshield wiper) and for landing the first 360 double tailwhip to downside tailwhip. A graduate of Hubbard High School in 2011, Bruce was studying business at Youngstown State University, but paused his studies to pursue a BMX career. In July 2021, Bruce qualified to compete in the BMX freestyle event at the 2020 Summer Olympics, one of the 9 competitors, representing 8 nations, to qualify; Bruce finished in 9th in the Olympic final.
