= Logan Martin (BMX rider) =

Australian BMX rider (born 1993)

Logan Martin OAM
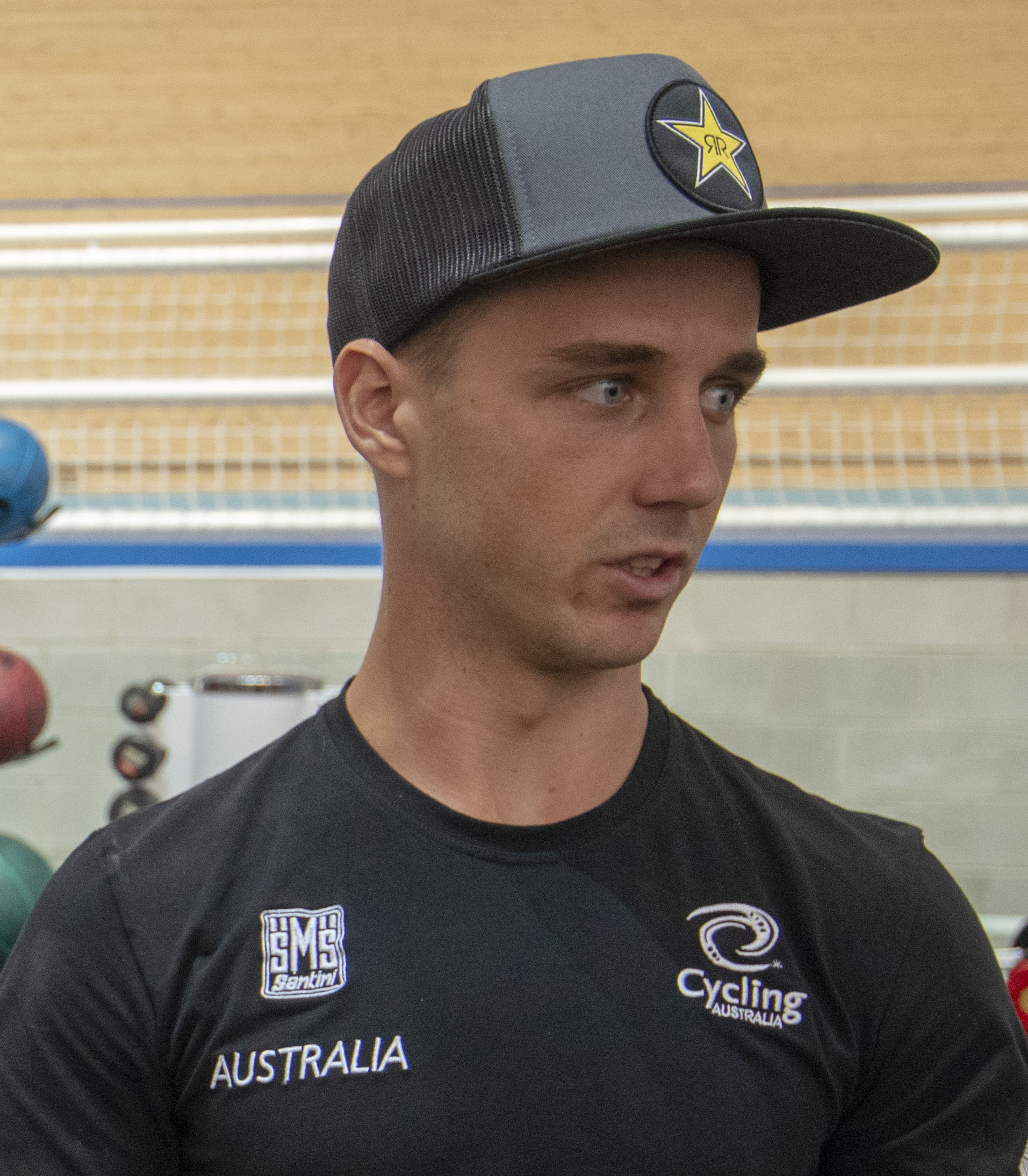
- Martin in 2019

Personal information
- National team: Australia
- Born: 22 November 1993 (age 32) Logan Reserve, Queensland, Australia
- Occupation: Professional BMX Athlete
- Height: 168 cm (5 ft 6 in)
- Weight: 68 kg (150 lb)
- Spouse: Kimberley Martin

YouTube information
- Channel: Logan Martin
- Years active: 2013–present
- Subscribers: 30.9 thousand
- Views: 2.78 million
- Last updated: 4 August 2026

Sport
- Sport: BMX freestyle
- Turned pro: 2013

Achievements and titles
- National finals: 2019 Freestyle Championships: 2020 Freestyle Championships: 2021 Freestyle Championships:
Medal record
Men's freestyle BMX
Representing Australia
Olympic Games
Gold medal – first place	2020 Tokyo	BMX freestyle
World Championships
Gold medal – first place	2017 Chengdu	Freestyle park
Gold medal – first place	2021 Montpellier	Freestyle park
Gold medal – first place	2024 Abu Dhabi	Freestyle Park
Silver medal – second place	2019 Chengdu	Freestyle park
Bronze medal – third place	2025 Riyadh	Freestyle Park
X Games
Gold medal – first place	2018 Minneapolis	BMX park
Gold medal – first place	2019 Minneapolis	BMX park
Gold medal – first place	2019 Minneapolis	BMX dirt
Gold medal – first place	2019 Minneapolis	BMX park
Gold medal – first place	2022 California	BMX park
Gold medal – first place	2024 Chiba	BMX park
Silver medal – second place	2016 Austin	BMX park
Silver medal – second place	2017 Minneapolis	BMX park
Silver medal – second place	2017 Minneapolis	BMX dirt
Silver medal – second place	2018 Minneapolis	BMX dirt
Silver medal – second place	2023 Chiba	BMX park
Silver medal – second place	2025 Osaka	BMX park best trick
Silver medal – second place	2026 Sacramento	BMX park
Silver medal – second place	2026 Sacramento	BMX park best trick
Bronze medal – third place	2022 Minneapolis	BMX park
Bronze medal – third place	2023 California	BMX park
Bronze medal – third place	2026 Sacramento	BMX dirt

Logan Martin OAM (born 22 November 1993) is an Australian professional dirt and park Freestyle BMX rider. In 2021, Martin won the gold medal in the inaugural Men's BMX freestyle event at the 2020 Summer Olympics in Tokyo.

== Career ==
Martin was only 12 years old when he first tried Freestyle BMX at his local park. In 2012 he traveled overseas for the first time and won his first international competition.

Martin debuted at the X-Games by taking Park silver at Austin 2016—the first rookie to score a BMX Park medal since Brazilian Diogo Canina in 2008.

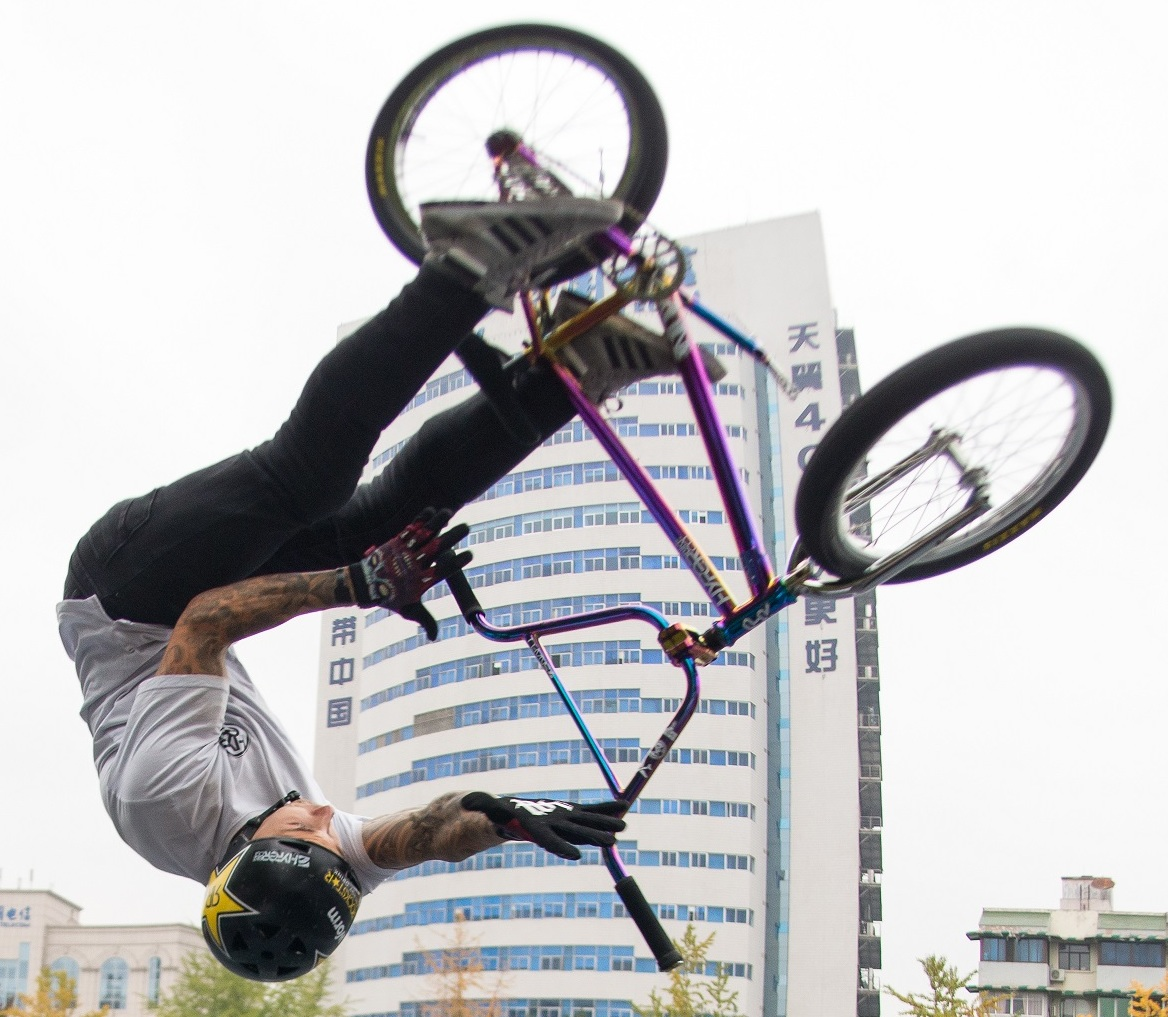
Martin performing a trick in 2017

In the 2022 Australia Day Honours Martin was awarded the Medal of the Order of Australia.

=== 2020 Olympics ===
In July 2021, Martin took part in the first ever BMX Freestyle competition at the Summer Olympics. In the seeding round, he was the only cyclist to score above 90 points and clinched the last start order in the finals. Martin scored 93.30 in the first final run, combining backflips, front flips and 540 flares, and went into the top spot. As no other competitors surpassed him in the second run, he won the gold medal which was the first for Australia in cycling since 2012. In the second run Martin missed a pedal and spent the rest of his run fist pumping to the audience.

=== 2024 Olympics ===
In June 2024, Martin qualified for the 2024 Summer Olympics in Paris. While he was finalising his Games preparation in Belgium, he had personal items stolen when thieves broke into a van in Brussels. At the Olympics, Martin qualified for the final with the third-best score. But the next day he clipped the edge of a jump on a trick before the end of the first run and landed heavily after a double flare and rode out in the second run. Martin finished ninth and last in the final.

== Competitive history ==
All results are sourced from the Union Cycliste Internationale.

As of August 7th, 2024

=== Olympic Games ===
Event	Freestyle Park
(Japan) 2020 Tokyo	Gold
(France) 2024 Paris	9th

=== UCI Cycling World Championships ===
Event	Freestyle Park
(China) 2017 Chengdu	Gold
(China) 2018 Chengdu	—
(China) 2019 Chengdu	Silver
(France) 2021 Montpellier	Gold
(United Arab Emirates) 2022 Abu Dhabi	6th
(United Kingdom) 2023 Glasgow	Silver

=== UCI BMX Freestyle Park World Cup ===
Season	1	2	3	4	Rank	Points
2022	MON; 2	BRU; 2	GOL; 1		1	2800
2023	DIR; 1	MON; 1	BRU; 3	BAZ; 1	1	3820
2024	ENO; 2	MON —	SHA		3	900

== Personal life ==
In 2017, Martin moved to the Gold Coast. In 2019, he built his own competition-sized (30 by 15-metre) BMX park in his backyard after his local training facility closed, at a cost of $70,000. This meant that during the COVID-19 pandemic related lockdowns, he was able to remain training without leaving his property. Martin had his first child, Noah Alexander, with partner Kimberley in 2019.
