= Cycling at the 2024 Summer Olympics – Men's BMX freestyle =

Men's BMX freestyle at the Games of the XXXIII Olympiad
- Olympic BMX cycling
- Venue: Place de la Concorde
- Date: 30–31 July 2024
- Competitors: 12 from 11 nations

Medalists
1st place, gold medalist(s)		José Torres	Argentina
2nd place, silver medalist(s)		Kieran Reilly	Great Britain
3rd place, bronze medalist(s)		Anthony Jeanjean	France

The men's BMX freestyle event at the 2024 Summer Olympics took place on 30 July and 31 July 2024 at the Place de la Concorde. 12 cyclists from 11 nations competed.

== Competition format ==
The competition is a two-round tournament, with a qualification round and a final. Each round has the cyclists all do two runs. The runs are 60 seconds long. Five judges give scores between 0.00 and 99.99 based on the difficulty and execution of the rider's run; the scores are averaged for a total run score. In the qualification round, the rider's two run scores are averaged to give a total qualification score. These qualification scores are used to determine the start order of the cyclists in the final, providing a knowledge advantage to the later riders. In the final, only the better score of the two runs counts.

== Schedule ==
The event took place over two consecutive days.

Legend
H	Heats/preliminaries	¼	Quarter-finals	LC	Last chance run	½	Semi-finals	F	Final

Event↓/Date →	Sat 27	Sun 28	Mon 29	Tue 30	Wed 31	Thu 1	Fri 2	Sat 3	Sun 4
BMX Freestyle
Men's freestyle				Q	F				

== Results ==
=== Qualification ===
The top nine cyclists advanced to the final. The qualification phase also determined the start order for the final. The best ranked rider from the qualification started last in the final.

Rank	Cyclist	Nation	Run 1	Run 2	Average	Notes
1	Kieran Reilly	Great Britain	91.68	90.75	91.21	Q
2	Marcus Christopher	United States	90.10	88.87	89.48	Q
3	Logan Martin	Australia	88.56	90.22	89.39	Q
4	Justin Dowell	United States	88.40	89.74	89.07	Q
5	Anthony Jeanjean	France	87.22	87.94	87.58	Q
6	Rim Nakamura	Japan	87.20	86.87	87.03	Q
7	José Torres	Argentina	86.24	87.08	86.66	Q
8	Gustavo Oliveira	Brazil	85.51	86.07	85.79	Q
9	Ernests Zēbolds	Latvia	84.60	85.29	84.94	Q
10	Jeffrey Whaley	Canada	76.20	80.83	78.51	
11	Marin Ranteš	Croatia	85.19	67.40	76.29	
12	Vincent Leygonie	South Africa	73.20	78.50	75.85	

=== Final ===
Rank	Cyclist	Nation	Run 1	Run 2	Best Run	Notes
1st place, gold medalist(s)	José Torres	Argentina	94.82	92.12	94.82	
2nd place, silver medalist(s)	Kieran Reilly	Great Britain	93.70	93.91	93.91	
3rd place, bronze medalist(s)	Anthony Jeanjean	France	3.22	93.76	93.76	
4	Marcus Christopher	United States	29.40	93.11	93.11	
5	Rim Nakamura	Japan	90.35	90.89	90.89	
6	Gustavo Oliveira	Brazil	90.20	88.88	90.20	
7	Justin Dowell	United States	88.35	54.60	88.35	
8	Ernests Zēbolds	Latvia	86.04	87.14	87.14	
9	Logan Martin	Australia	64.40	33.40	64.40	

== See also ==
- Cycling at the 2024 Summer Olympics – Women's BMX freestyle
