= Marcus Christopher =

American freestyle BMX cyclist (born 2002)

Personal information
- Born: December 31, 2002 (age 23) Hartville, Ohio U.S.

Cycling career
- Sport: Cycling
- Discipline: Freestyle BMX
- Role: Rider
Medal record
Men's freestyle BMX
Representing the United States
World Championships
Silver medal – second place	2025 Riyadh	Freestyle Park
X Games
Gold medal – first place	2024 Ventura	BMX park
Gold medal – first place	2026 Chiba	BMX park
Silver medal – second place	2023 Chiba	BMX park
Silver medal – second place	2025 Salt Lake City	BMX park
Silver medal – second place	2026 Chiba	BMX park best trick
Bronze medal – third place	2023 Chiba	BMX park
Bronze medal – third place	2024 Chiba	BMX park
Bronze medal – third place	2024 Chiba	BMX park best trick

Marcus Christopher (born December 31, 2002) is an American professional freestyle BMX rider. He represented the United States at the 2024 Summer Olympics.

== Early life ==
Christopher was born to Matt and Lori Christopher, and has a younger brother, Charlie. He attended Lake High School in Lake Township, Stark County, Ohio. He turned pro in 2016 at age 13.

== Career ==
Christopher made his X Games debut at 16 years old in 2019. In May 2023, he won a bronze medal in BMX park in Japan. In July 2023, during the Summer X Games in California he suffered a broken jaw and cheekbone when he overshot his landing spot on a transfer and crashed face-first to the ground. He underwent surgery and had his jaw wired shut for two weeks. In June 2024, he competed at the 2024 Summer X Games in Ventura, California and won a gold medal in BMX park with a score of 95.66, finishing nearly five points ahead of silver medal winner Kevin Peraza.

In December 2023, Christopher was selected to compete in the 2024 Olympic Qualifier Series. During the second leg of the qualifier series in Budapest, he finished in second place with a score of 92.98. As a result, he qualified to represent United States at the 2024 Summer Olympics where he was the youngest competitor in the field. During the men's BMX freestyle event he finished in fourth place with a score of 93.11, just behind France's Anthony Jeanjean score of 93.76. Christopher achieved the best result for United States in men's BMX freestyle at the Olympics.

In June 2025, he competed at the 2025 Summer X Games Salt Lake City and won a silver medal in the BMX park event, behind compatriot Justin Dowell. In July 2026, he competed at the 2026 Summer X Games in Chiba, Japan, and won a gold medal in the BMX park event, and a silver medal in the BMX park best trick event.

== Competitive history ==
All results are sourced from the Union Cycliste Internationale.

As of August 8th, 2024

=== Olympic Games ===
Event	Freestyle Park
(France) 2024 Paris	4th

=== UCI Cycling World Championships ===
Event	Freestyle Park
(United Arab Emirates) 2022 Abu Dhabi	4th
(Saudi Arabia) 2025 Riyadh	Silver

=== UCI BMX Freestyle Park World Cup ===
Season	1	2	3	4	Rank	Points
2022	MON; 5	BRU; 4	GOL; 4		3	2260
2023	DIR; 2	MON; 3	BRU; 12	BAZ; 5	4	2830
2024	ENO; 8	MON —	SHA		18	570
