= Irek Rizaev =

Russian BMX rider (born 1997)

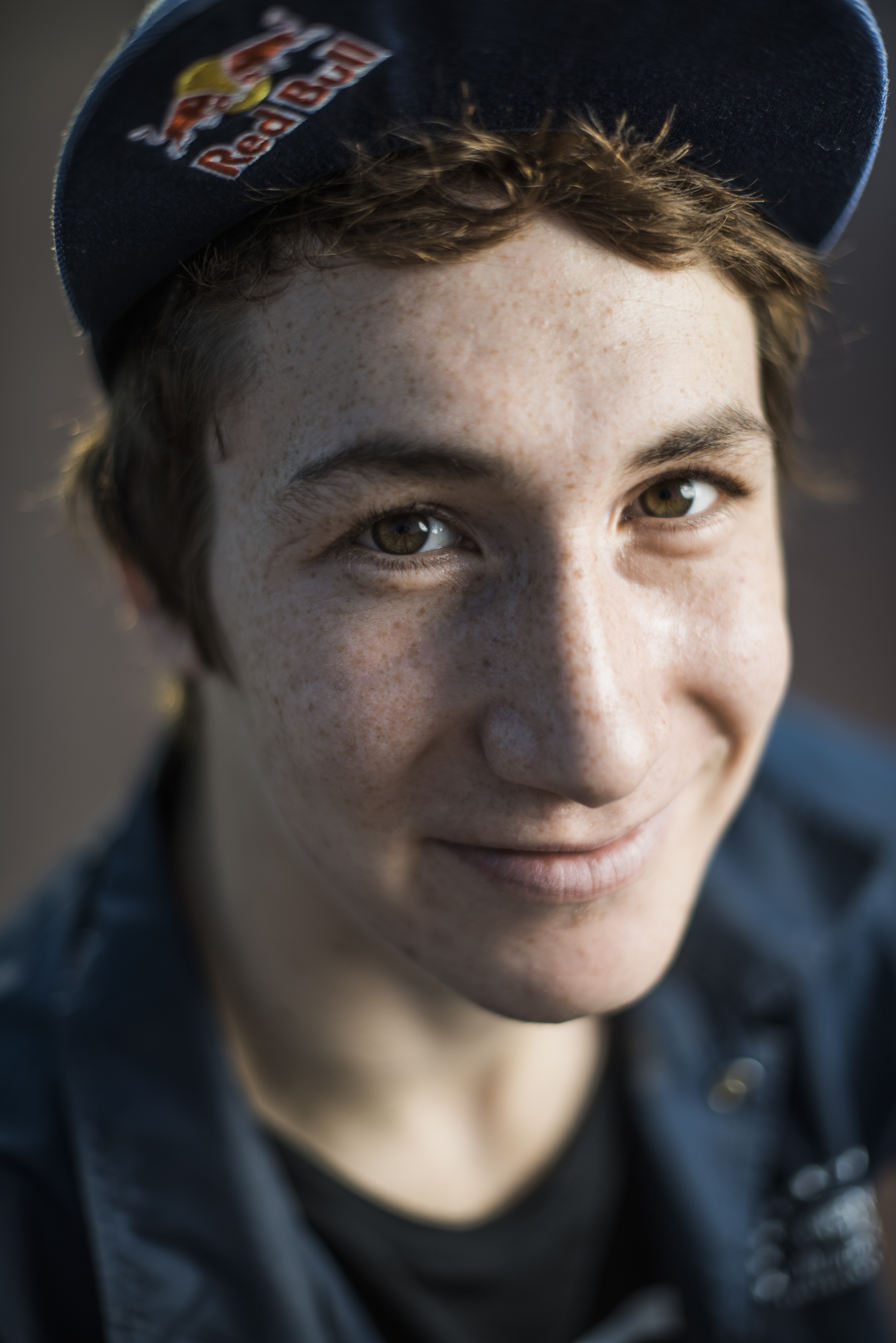
- Irek Rizaev

Personal information
- Full name: Irek Yevgenyvich Rizaev
- Born: 1 October 1997 (age 28) Kazan, Russia

Sport
- Country: Russia
- Sport: Freestyle BMX, Dirt jumping

Irek Yevgenyvich Rizaev (Russian: Ирек Евгеньевич Ризаев: born October 1, 1997, in Kazan) is a Russian BMX rider. He's a regular participant in Russian as well as international BMX freestyle competitions. He's already won multiple titles and medals in his career. He's is also part of the Russian national BMX freestyle-team.

He's 2016, 2017 and 2019 Russian Champion in BMX freestyle. He's the first Russian athlete to take part in the 2017 BMX Nitro World Games organized by Nitro Circus.

== Biography ==
Rizaev was born on October 1, 1997, in Kazan, Russia and is of Tatar descent.

He started riding BMX in 2009 at the age of 12. The first time he took part in a BMX competition was in 2010, in Kazan, when he received a prize for being the best talent. In 2011, Irek began to participate in Russian races and took part in his first official Russian BMX Championship in Krasnoyarsk. Since 2014, he participates in international competitions like Simple Session, The Bowl and others. He has an all-rounder style of riding that features a wide range of meaty tricks.

Since 2016, Irek is studying a degree in economics at the Kazan National Research Technological University (KNITU).

== Personal Records ==
Irek was world's first to do certain tricks on his BMX bike:

- A 360 WHIP TO BAR TO OPO WHIP

It's a 360 tail VIP to bar-spin to oppose tail VIP, which is known as the most difficult combination of tricks. During a 360-degree turn, the rider scrolls the frame around its axis, catches it, scrolls the steering wheel around its axis, and then scrolls the frame in the opposite direction. He did the trick for the first time in 2016.

- A QUINT WHIP

Five tail-wip. The rider does five revolutions of a bicycle around its axis in the air. Prior to Irek, the record of 4 tail-wips lasted about 10 years. He did the trick for the first time in 2017.

== Career highlights ==
- 2014 - 1st Place: XSA Backyard Jam, Krasnodar, Russia
- 2015 - 2nd Place: Moscow BMX Games Vert, Moscow, Russia
- 2015 - 2nd Place: The Bowl Moscow, Moscow, Russia
- 2015 - 1st Place: Moscow BMX Games Vert, Moscow, Russica
- 2016 - 1st Place: Moscow BMX Games Vert, Moscow, Russia
- 2016 - 2nd Place: Baltic Games (Park), Gdańsk, Poland
- 2016 - 3rd Place: Baltic Games (Dirt), Gdańsk, Poland
- 2017 - 1st Place: Urban Games, Electrogorsk, Russia
- 2017 - 3rd Place: UCI BMX Park World Cup, Budapest, Hungary
- 2017 - 1st Place: Russian National BMX Freestyle Championship, Sochi, Russia
- 2018 - 2nd Place: Simple Session – BMX Park, Tallinn, Estonia
- 2018 - Toyota Triple Challenge, Best Trick Winner, Glendale (Arizona), United States
- 2018 - 1st Place: Munich Mash – BMX Park, Munich, Germany
- 2019 - 2nd Place: Fise UCI BMX Park World Cup, Montpellier, France
- 2019 - Best trick winner - Fise European Series, Châteauroux, France
- 2019 - 2nd Place: Pannonian Challenge, Osijek, Croatia
- 2019 - 1st Place: Russian National BMX Freestyle Championship, Krasnodar, Russia
- 2019 - 4th Place: Simple Session – BMX Park, Tallinn, Estonia
- 2019 - 1st Place Red Bull Uncontained - BMX Park, Nijmegen, Netherlands
- 2021 - 2nd place BMX Freestyle Park European Champions - BMX Park, Moscow, Russica
- 2022 - 1st Place: Russian National BMX Freestyle Championship - BMX Park, Moscow, Russica
