= Brandon Loupos =

Australian BMX cyclist (born 1993)

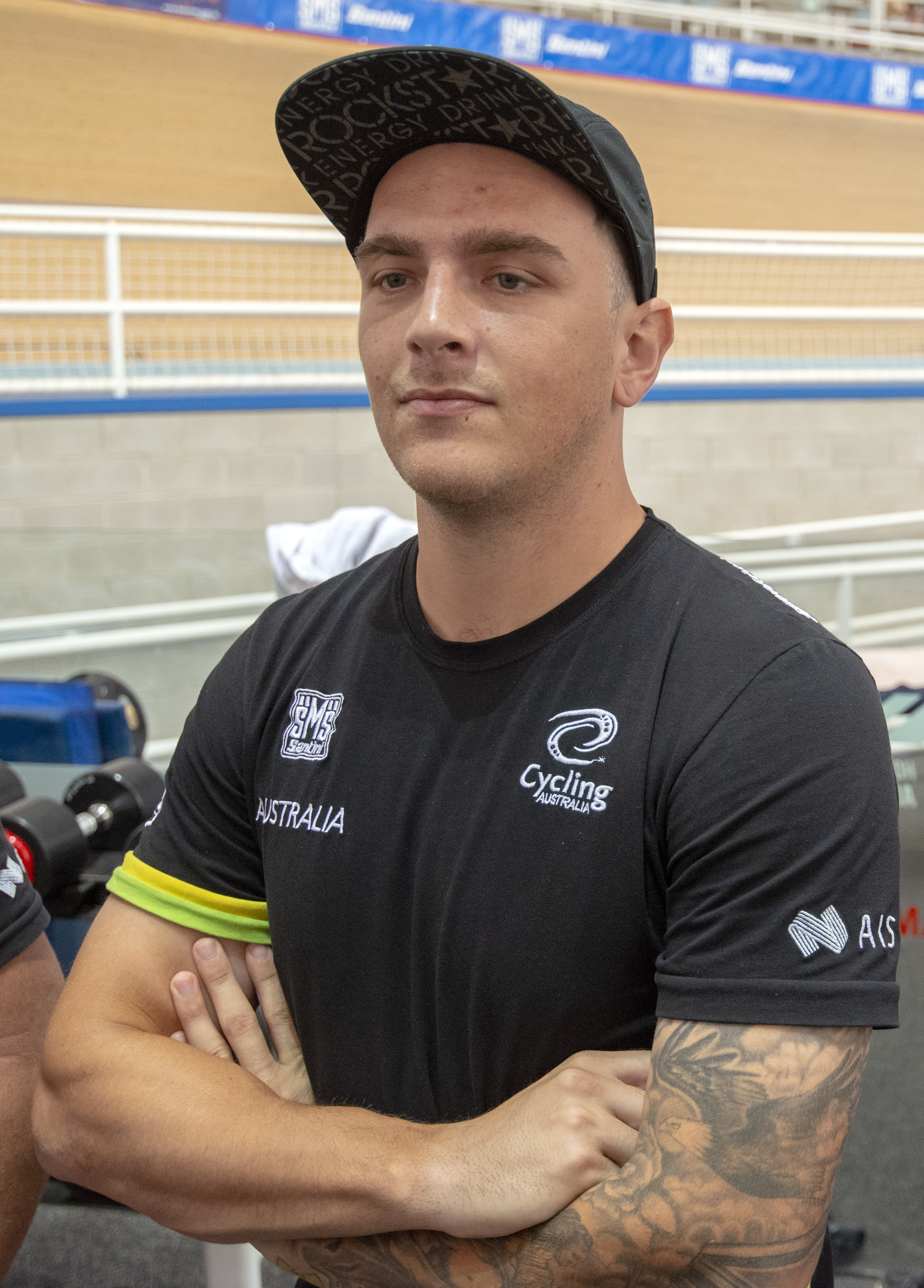

Personal information
- Born: 27 March 1993 (age 33) Sydney, Australia

Sport
- Country: Australia
- Sport: Freestyle BMX, Dirt jumping
Medal record
Men's BMX
Representing Australia
World Championships
Gold medal – first place	2019 Chengdu	Freestyle park BMX
Bronze medal – third place	2018 Chengdu	Freestyle park BMX

Brandon Loupos (born 27 March 1993) is an Australian BMX cyclist.

He won two medals, in the freestyle park event, at the World Urban Cycling Championships, gold in 2019 and bronze in 2018.
