= Kieran Reilly =

British bicycle motocross rider

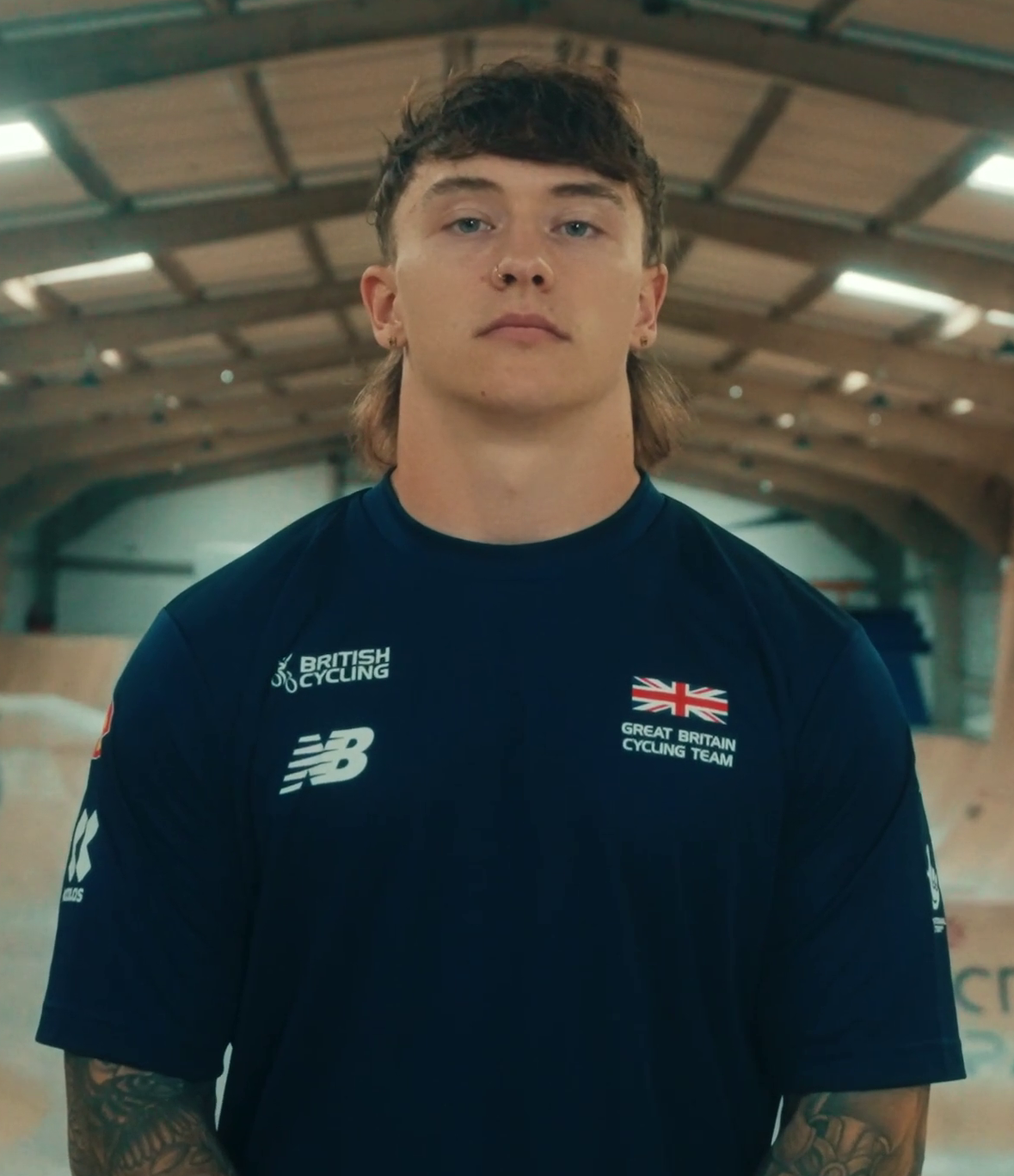
- Reilly in 2024

Personal information
- Full name: Kieran Darren David Reilly
- Born: 12 July 2001 (age 25) Gateshead, England

Sport
- Sport: Freestyle BMX
Medal record
Men's freestyle BMX
Representing Great Britain
Olympics
Silver medal – second place	2024 Paris	BMX freestyle
World Championships
Gold medal – first place	2023 Glasgow	Freestyle park
European Games
Gold medal – first place	2023 Kraków-Małopolska	Freestyle Park
European Championships
Gold medal – first place	2024 Cadenazzo	Freestyle Park
Silver medal – second place	2022 Munich	Freestyle Park

Kieran Darren David Reilly (born 12 July 2001) is a British cyclist from Gateshead who competes in Freestyle BMX. In August 2023 he became the World Champion at the event.

== Early life ==
Reilly was raised in Gateshead, and attended Heworth Grange School.

== Career ==
Reilly began performing tricks on his BMX at the Leam Lane skatepark, in Gateshead. He entered his first competition at the Urban Games in Whitley Bay. Reilly came to prominence in BMX in 2012, when as an 11-year-old he landed a 720 – two full spins in one jump – over a spine at a skatepark in Glasgow, Scotland.

Reilly moved to Corby in Northamptonshire, in September 2020, to train with other Team GB riders. Reilly landed the world's first-ever 'Triple Flair' - three full backflips and a 180-degree rotation at the end - at the 'Adrenaline Alley' indoor skatepark in Northamptonshire, in January 2022. In August 2022, he won silver at the 2022 European BMX Championships in Munich.

In June 2023, Reilly won the gold medal at the 2023 European Games with victory in the men's BMX freestyle park in Krzeszowice. In August 2023 he won gold at the UCI Urban Cycling World Championships – Men's freestyle BMX in Glasgow.

Reilly received a Silver Medal at the 2024 Summer Olympics. At first he scored 93.70 in the final and sit in the second position. In the second run French Anthony Jeanjean overcame Reilly scoring 93.76 and placed him to the third. On his second attempt Reilly achieved a best-run score of 93.91 and finished second. In July 2024, he became British national champion. He won gold at the 2024 European BMX Championships in Cadenazzo, Switzerland in September 2024. He suffered a broken foot in April 2025 and was subsequently unable to compete at the 2025 UCI Urban Cycling World Championships through injury.

== Competitive history ==
All results are sourced from the Union Cycliste Internationale.

As of August 9th, 2024

=== Olympic Games ===
Event	Freestyle Park
(France) 2024 Paris	Silver

=== UCI Cycling World Championships ===
Event	Freestyle Park
(United Arab Emirates) 2022 Abu Dhabi	10th
(United Kingdom) 2023 Glasgow	Gold

=== UCI BMX Freestyle Park World Cup ===
Season	1	2	3	4	Rank	Points
2022	MON; 24	BRU; 3	GOL; 6		7	1530
2023	DIR; 9	MON; 5	BRU; 1	BAZ; 2	2	2910
2024	ENO; 31	MON —	SHA		53	24
