= Declan Brooks =

British bicycle motocross rider

Declan Brooks OLY
Personal information
- Full name: Declan Brooks
- Born: 10 July 1996 (age 30) Portsmouth, England

Sport
- Sport: Freestyle BMX
Medal record
Men's freestyle BMX
Representing Great Britain
Olympic Games
| Bronze medal – third place | 2020 Tokyo | BMX freestyle |
European Games
| Bronze medal – third place | 2023 Kraków-Małopolska | Freestyle Park |
European Championships
| Bronze medal – third place | 2019 Cadenazzo | Freestyle Park |
| Bronze medal – third place | 2023 Krzeszowice | Freestyle Park |

Declan Brooks OLY (born 10 July 1996) is a British Olympic bronze medalist winning cyclist who competes in Freestyle BMX.

Brooks was born in Portsmouth and attended Cams Hill School and would practice at the Southsea skate park. He won a bronze medal at the European BMX Championships in Valmiera, and a silver in the freestyle World Cup in 2019, and achieved a tenth-place finish at the 2019 UCI Urban Cycling World Championships, in Chengdu.

In June 2021 he was confirmed on the Great Britain team for the delayed 2020 Summer Games in Tokyo. On 1 August he won the bronze medal in the BMX Freestyle.

Brooks later coached European champion Sasha Pardoe.

== Personal life ==
In 2017, Brooks appeared as a contestant on the ITV dating gameshow Take Me Out.

== Contest history ==
- 2019 UCI Urban Cycling World Championships - Park: 3rd
- 2019 UEC BMX Freestyle Park European Championships - 3rd
