= Kenneth Tencio =

Costa Rican cyclist (born 1993)

Personal information
- Full name: Kenneth Tencio Esquivel
- Born: 6 December 1993 (age 32) Guadalupe, Cartago, Costa Rica

Sport
- Country: Costa Rica
- Sport: Freestyle BMX, Dirt jumping

Achievements and titles
- Olympic finals: 4th (2020)

Kenneth Tencio Esquivel (born 6 December 1993) is a Costa Rican freestyle or freestyle BMX cyclist. He is an athlete known in Costa Rica for participating in BMX freestyle competitions in the X-Knights, winning the silver medal in the 2018 UCI Urban Cycling World Championships and for qualifying for the 2020 Summer Olympics.

== Biography ==
Kenneth Tencio returned to Costa Rica after a trip to the United States and Mexico where he made multiple sporting appearances and formally joined the Red Bull team, for 2014 he was designated as one of the fastest growing and most complete Riders of the moment, closing that year in position 9 in the world ranking. He was runner-up in the 2018 Urban Cycling World Championships held in Chengdu, China, behind the American Justin Dowell.

He won third place in the BMX Freestyle: Simple Session Tallinn in Estonia 2018 and also participated in 2019, obtaining the same position. In 2019 he won the BMX championship in Madrid (European BMX Freestyle Park Championship).

The same year, Kenneth Tencio participated in the BMX world championships in China, remaining in position number 13, not being able to enter the first 12 places to play in the finals of the competitions but his results were enough for him to qualify for the Tokyo 2020 Olympic Games. He was placed 4th at the Olympics.

Currently a resident of Jacó (Costa Rica) where he has his own training ground: 10cio Park, a sports complex for freestyle.
