= Daniel Sandoval (BMX rider) =

American BMX cyclist (born 1994)

- Sandoval in 2026

Personal information
- Nationality: American
- Born: July 13, 1994 (age 32)
- Home town: Corona, California, U.S.
- Occupation: Professional BMX Athlete

Sport
- Country: United States
- Sport: Freestyle BMX
Medal record
Men's BMX
Representing United States
World Championships
Silver medal – second place	2021 Montpellier	Freestyle park BMX

Daniel Sandoval (born July 13, 1994) is an American BMX Dirt and Freestyle rider from Corona, California.

== Contest history ==
- 2011 NASS - Park: 2nd
- 2012 FISE Costa Rica - Park: 2nd Place
- 2012 FISE France - Spine: 3rd Place
- 2013 FISE France - Park: 2nd Place
- 2013 FISE France - Spine: 1st
- 2013 X Games Munich - Park: 3rd
- 2013 Play BMX Contest - Park: 1st
- 2013 Cuerna Style - Dirt: 1st
- 2014 Red Bull Dirt Conquers - 2nd
- 2014 Vans Off The Wall Invitational - 1st Place
- 2014 X Games Austin - Park: 3rd
- 2015 X Games Austin - Park: 1st
- 2015 Fise Montpellier - Park: 1st
- 2015 FISE Chengdu - Park: 3rd Place
- 2015 NASS - Park: 3rd
- 2016 Nitro World Games - BMX Triple Hit: 4th
- 2016 X Games Minneapolis - Park: 3rd
- 2016 NASS - Dirt: 3rd
- 2017 Toronto X-Jam - 3rd
- 2018 Toronto X-Jam - 1st
- 2018 FISE UCI World Cup Edmonton - Park: 4th
- 2019 UCI C1 Costa-Rica - Park: 2nd
- 2019 X Games Minneapolis - Park: 4th / Best Trick: 2nd
- 2019 FISE Xperience Le Havre - Park: 3rd
- 2019 Palladium Freestyle Slap - Park: 1st
- 2022 Nitro World Games - Triple Hit: 1st
