= Daniel Dhers =

Venezuelan bicycle motocross rider

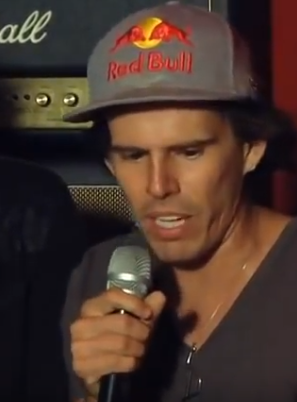
- Dhers in 2012

Personal information
- Full name: Daniel Eduardo Dhers Arellano
- Born: March 25, 1985 (age 41) Caracas, Venezuela
- Height: 5 ft 7 in (170 cm)
- Weight: 134 lb (61 kg)

Sport
- Country: Venezuela
- Sport: BMX
- Rank: 6 × X-Games medals / 4 × Overall Dew tour champion / 2014 Overall FISE world series champion / Numerous FISE (BMX masters, LG Action Sports...) medals
Medal record
Men's freestyle BMX
Representing Venezuela
Olympics
Silver medal – second place	2020 Tokyo	BMX freestyle
Pan American Games
Gold medal – first place	2019 Lima	BMX Freestyle
Summer X Games
Gold medal – first place	2007 Los Angeles	BMX Freestyle Park
Gold medal – first place	2008 Los Angeles	BMX Freestyle Park
Gold medal – first place	2010 Los Angeles	BMX Freestyle Park
Gold medal – first place	2011 Los Angeles	BMX Freestyle Park
Gold medal – first place	2013 Munich	BMX Freestyle Park
Bronze medal – third place	2006 Los Angeles	BMX Freestyle Park

Daniel Dhers (born March 25, 1985, in Caracas, Venezuela) is a Venezuelan professional BMX rider. He is currently sponsored by Red Bull, POC, DC Shoes, Specialized, Albe's Mailorder, Sony and Verizon. Dhers lived in Greenville, North Carolina, known as Protown USA because of the concentration of BMX riders that live there, including Dave Mirra. Dhers in 2013 opened in Holly Springs, North Carolina a public mountain biking, BMX, and skateboarding park, the Daniel Dhers Action Sports Complex.

== Career ==
Dhers began riding BMX when he was twelve years old in Caracas to socialize with friends and in 1998 he visited his first skatepark. Then, he started traveling to different countries to compete and gain experience. In 2003, he entered his first contest. In 2006, Dhers went to the United States and won the Dew Action Sports Tour, which he would win again in 2007, 2008, and 2010. He would also win gold medals at the X Games in 2007, 2008, and 2010. He was featured on several episodes of the American TV program Nitro Circus. He has traveled the world competing and promoting the sport.

Dhers is one of the most decorated BMX riders of all time.

He will stop his career after 2024 olympics. He joined BMX freestyle coach for team China.

== Daniel Dhers Action Sports Complex ==
In 2013 Dhers and Abel Zalcberg founded the Daniel Dhers Action Sports Complex, which opened on May 3, 2014 in North Carolina. The 37,000-square-foot family-oriented BMX, scooter and skateboarding facility includes both indoor and outdoor parks.
