= 2021 UCI Urban Cycling World Championships =

Cycling world championships

- Venue: Montpellier, France
- Date: 4– 8 June 2021
- Velodrome: Sud de France Arena
- Events: 8

The 2021 UCI Urban Cycling World Championships was the fourth edition of the UCI Urban Cycling World Championships, and was held from 4 to 8 June 2021 in Montpellier, France.

The 2021 championships comprised events in freestyle BMX only. Previous editions had included events in cross-country eliminator and trials.

== Medal summary ==
=== Freestyle BMX ===
==== Flatland ====
Event	Gold	Silver	Bronze
Men	Matthias Dandois; France	Moto Sasaki; Japan (佐々木 元)	Alexandre Jumelin; France
Women	Irina Sadovnik; Austria	Julia Preuss; Germany	Céline Vaes; France

==== Park ====
Event	Gold	Silver	Bronze
Men	Logan Martin; Australia	Daniel Sandoval; United States	Marin Ranteš; Croatia
Women	Hannah Roberts; United States	Nikita Ducarroz; Switzerland	Charlotte Worthington; Great Britain

== Medal table ==
* Host nation (France)

Rank	Nation	Gold	Silver	Bronze	Total
1	United States	1	1	0	2
2	France*	1	0	2	3
3	Australia	1	0	0	1
3	Austria	1	0	0	1
5	Germany	0	1	0	1
5	Japan	0	1	0	1
5	Switzerland	0	1	0	1
8	Croatia	0	0	1	1
8	Great Britain	0	0	1	1
Totals (9 entries)		4	4	4	12

== See also ==
- 2021 UCI BMX World Championships
- 2021 UCI Mountain Bike World Championships
- 2017 UCI Urban Cycling World Championships
- Cycling at the 2020 Summer Olympics – Women's BMX freestyle
- Cycling at the 2020 Summer Olympics – Men's BMX freestyle
