= 2019 UCI Urban Cycling World Championships =

Cycling world championships

- Venue: Chengdu, China
- Date: 6 – 10 November 2019
- Events: 8

The 2019 UCI Urban Cycling World Championships was the third edition of the UCI Urban Cycling World Championships, and was held in Chengdu, China for the third consecutive year.

The 2019 championships comprised events in freestyle BMX and trials

== Medal summary ==
=== Freestyle BMX ===
==== Flatland ====
Event	Gold	Silver	Bronze
Men	Dominik Nekolny; Czech Republic	Matthias Dandois; France	Moto Sasaki; Japan
Women	Irina Sadovnik; Austria	Misaki Katagiri; Japan	Julia Preuss; Germany

==== Park ====
Event	Gold	Silver	Bronze
Men	Brandon Loupos; Australia	Logan Martin; Australia	Nick Bruce; United States
Women	Hannah Roberts; United States	Macarena Perez Grasset; Chile	Charlotte Worthington; Great Britain

=== Mountain bike trials ===
==== 20 inch ====
Event	Gold	Silver	Bronze
Men	Dominik Oswald; Germany	Borja Conejos; Spain	Ion Areitio; Spain
Women	Nina Reichenbach; Germany	Vera Barón; Spain	Manon Basseville; France

==== 26 inch ====
Event	Gold	Silver	Bronze
Men	Sergi Llongueras; Spain	Nicolas Vallée; France	Jack Carthy; Great Britain

==== Team ====
Event	Gold	Silver	Bronze
Men	Spain; Alejandro Montalvo; Tony Guillén; Sergi Llongueras; Daniel Barón; Vera Barón	Switzerland; Tom Blaser; Lucien Leiser; Vito Gonzalez; Lori Gonzalez; Debi Studer	France; Nicolas Vallée; Charles Chibaudel; Louis Grillon; Thomas Jeu; Manon Basseville

== Medal table ==
* Host nation (France)

Rank	Nation	Gold	Silver	Bronze	Total
1	Spain	2	2	1	5
2	Germany	2	0	1	3
3	Australia	1	1	0	2
4	United States	1	0	1	2
5	Austria	1	0	0	1
5	Czech Republic	1	0	0	1
7	France	0	2	2	4
8	Japan	0	1	1	2
9	Chile	0	1	0	1
9	Switzerland	0	1	0	1
11	Great Britain	0	0	2	2
Totals (11 entries)		8	8	8	24
