= 2018 UCI Urban Cycling World Championships =

Cycling world championships

- Venue: Chengdu, China
- Date: 7 – 11 November 2018
- Events: 8

The 2018 UCI Urban Cycling World Championships was the second edition of the UCI Urban Cycling World Championships, and was held in Chengdu, China for the second consecutive year.

The 2018 championships comprised events in freestyle BMX, mountain bike trials and mountain bike eliminator.

== Medal summary ==
=== Freestyle BMX ===
==== Park ====
Event	Gold	Silver	Bronze
Men	Justin Dowell; United States	Kenneth Tencio; Costa Rica	Brandon Loupos; Australia
Women	Perris Benegas; United States	Angie Marino; United States	Hannah Roberts; United States

=== Mountain bike trials ===
==== 20 inch ====
Event	Gold	Silver	Bronze
Men	Thomas Pechhaker; Austria	Ion Areitio Aguirre; Spain	Dominik Oswald; Germany
Women	Nina Reichenbach; Germany	Manon Basseville; France	Janine Jungfels; Australia

==== 26 inch ====
Event	Gold	Silver	Bronze
Men	Jack Carthy; Great Britain	Sergi Llongueras; Spain	Nicolas Vallée; France

==== Team ====
Event	Gold	Silver	Bronze
Mixed	Spain; Alejandro Montalvo; Martí Arán; Sergi Llongueras; Ion Areitio; Irene Caminos	Germany; Dominik Oswald; Noah Sandritter; Oliver Widmann; Nina Reichenbach; Andreas Strasser	France; Nicolas Vallée; Alex Rudeau; Nathan Charra; Arnaud Janin; Manon Basseville

=== Mountain bike eliminator ===
Event	Gold	Silver	Bronze
Men	Titouan Perrin-Ganier; France	Hugo Briatta; France	Lorenzo Serres; France
Women	Colin Clauzure; France	Iryna Popova; Ukraine	Marion Fromberger; Germany

== Medal table ==
Rank	Nation	Gold	Silver	Bronze	Total
1	France	2	2	3	7
2	United States	2	1	1	4
3	Spain	1	2	0	3
4	Germany	1	1	2	4
5	Austria	1	0	0	1
5	Great Britain	1	0	0	1
7	Costa Rica	0	1	0	1
7	Ukraine	0	1	0	1
9	Australia	0	0	2	2
Totals (9 entries)		8	8	8	24
