= Dirt jumping =

Trick in dirt biking

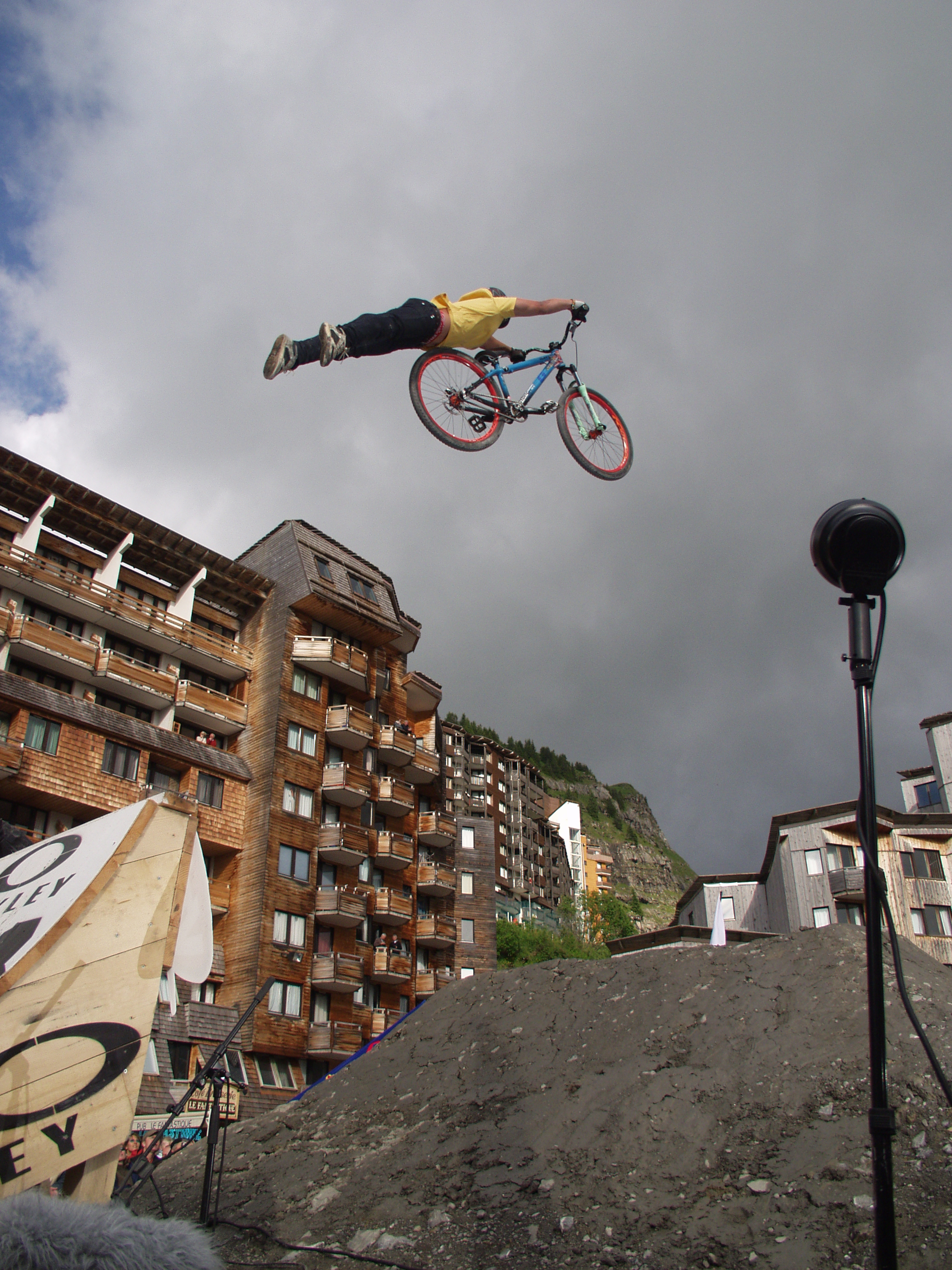
A biker performing a dirt jump

Dirt jumping or dirt jump is the practice of riding bikes over jumps made of dirt or soil and becoming airborne. Dirt jumping evolved alongside BMX racing and is similar to BMX or mountain bike racing in that the rider jumps off of mounds of dirt, usually performing a midair trick in between. It differs in that the jumps are usually much larger and designed to lift the rider higher into the air. Additionally, the goal is not to complete the course with the fastest time, but rather to perform the tricks with the style. Dirt jumping can be performed on BMX bikes or specialized mountain bikes known simply as "dirt jumpers".

== Dirt jumping bikes ==
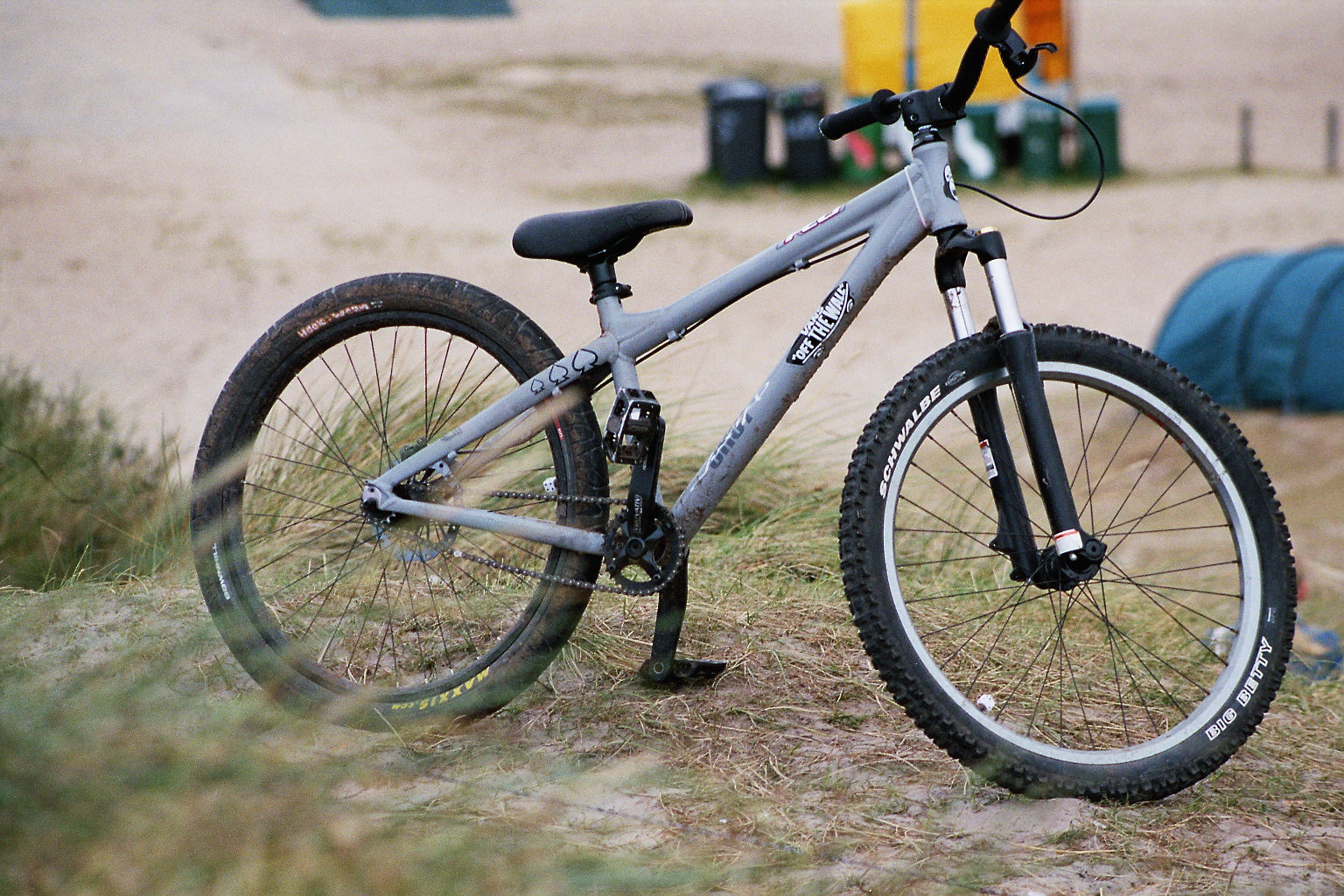
A typical dirt jump-mountain bike.

Dirt jumping uses a specific kind of bike. BMX, for instance, has a range of bikes built for this activity. One of its key differences from general purpose bikes is the fit. There is only one standard BMX dirt jumping bike frame, which is meant to fit all riders, young and old. These bicycles tend to have a longer top tube than a street BMX bike and are often more robustly built to withstand the poundings from the jumps. They will rarely have pegs fitted. Traditionally, DJ (dirt jump) bikes ran only a rear v-brake but disc brakes are becoming more common. DJ tires are treaded - the heaviest treads of all the BMX bikes - as opposed to the slicks and semi-slicks used for park riding. The wheel size is mostly 20-inch 26 is more for DJ.

Some riders prefer large, padded seats for in-flight tricks while others do not find seat size an issue. The gear ratio is generally around 44:16, 36:13, 33:12, and 30:11, although using smaller gear ratios such as 25:9, also known as 'micro gearing', has become popular.

There is also the so-called hybrid BMX/jump bike, which is a scaled-up BMX with 24-inch wheels. Strong alloy rims and a lightweight frame. Suited to bigger jumps or more challenging competition courses. Other types of dirt jumping bikes include:

- Freestyle motocross (FMX, Moto-X) of various sizes & engine sizes.
- Dirt jump/freestyle mountain bikes look similar to mountain bikes but usually have a rigid frame and a lower stand-over height, in order to keep the seat out of the way while performing tricks. Some high end DJ frames also have short travel rear suspension, sometimes with bottom-bracket-concentric pivots to allow singlespeed use. The wheels are usually more robust than a cross country mountain bike's and the same for the frame.
- Mountain bikes - 24- or 26-inch wheels and either rigid forks or forks with short front end suspension (usually 80–100 mm travel, but can be up to 203 mm depending on the type of the bicycle). A firm suspension is desirable for dirt jumping.

A mountain bike built for dirt jumping tends to have a smaller frame than what is used for other disciplines. Running singlespeed with one brake is very common. using single or dual disc brakes has replaced the use of only one rear V-brake. In general, a mountain bike dedicated to dirt jumping will have 24- or 26-inch wheels, a gear ratio of approximately 60 gear inches (~36:15 on a 24-inch rear wheel or ~36:16 on a 26-inch rear wheel) and rigid or 80-100mm travel forks. An 'all-round' bike used for dirt jumping will more likely have 26-inch wheels, a 25-36 tooth chainring with a wide-ratio cassette and a short- to mid-travel fork. Mountain bike dirt jumpers are usually split on the basis of wheel size because the wheel size dictates the shape of the takeoff to an extent.

A 20-inch BMX bike for dirt generally has a 48-spoke rear rim and a 36-spoke front to prevent rim collapse in the case of casing a jump. The frame is a little bit longer to aid in stability and to spread the load of heavy lands. Most of these "micro geared" bikes run 85 to 100 psi tires, and tires are usually threaded and made with kevlar bead to prevent pressure flats and tears.

== Types of jumps ==
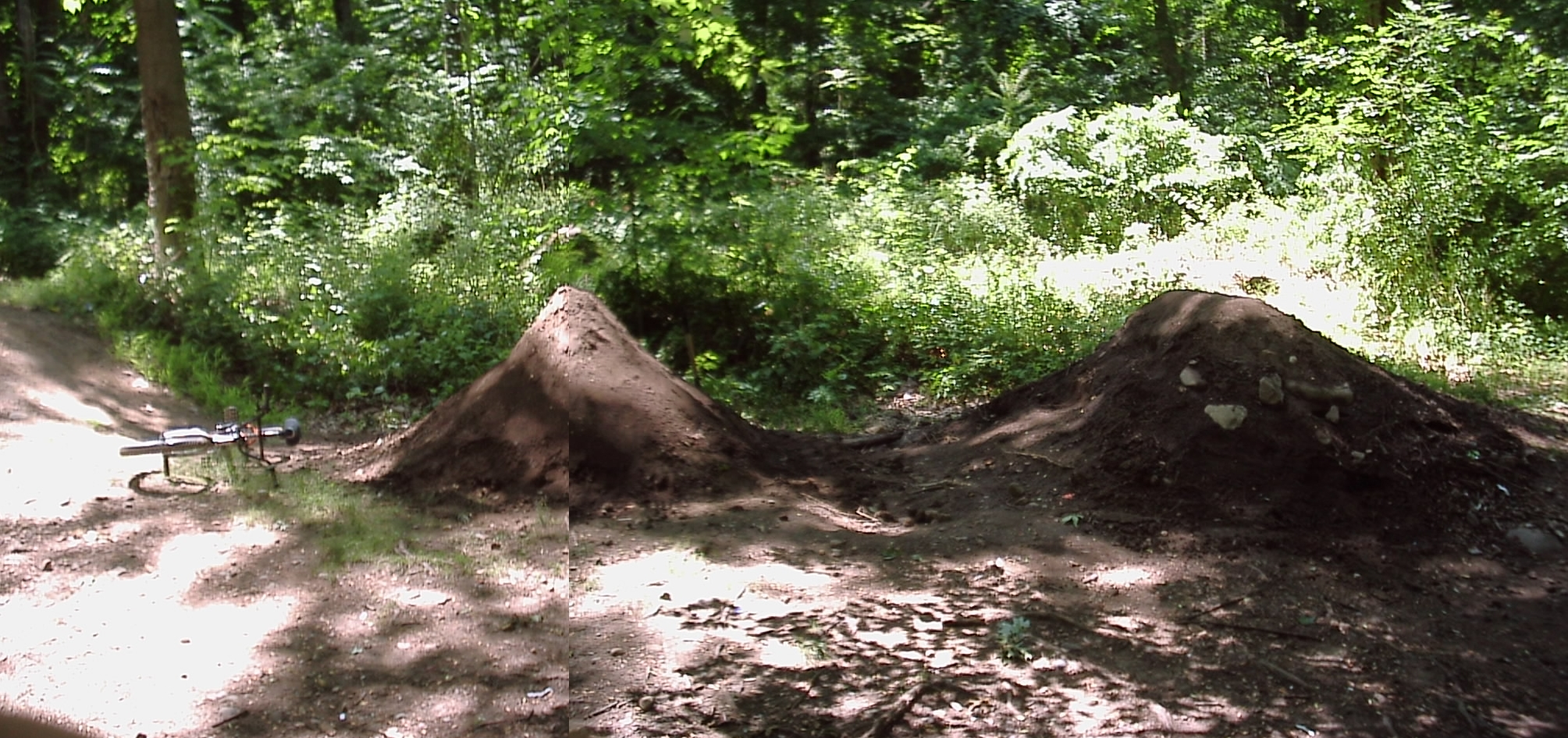
A freshly built small double at the overlook trails in New Jersey.

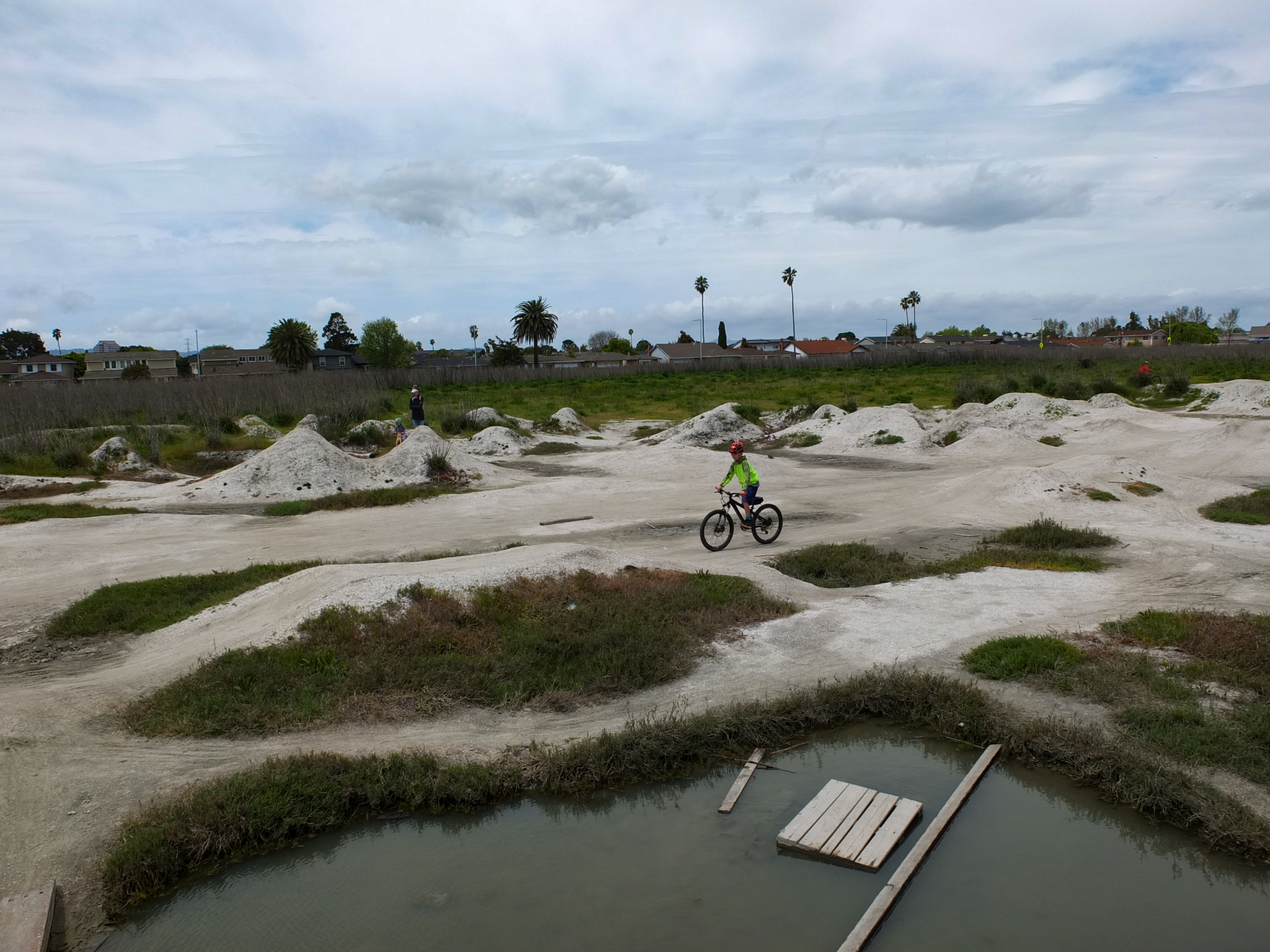
Shells Dirt Jumps at Foster City, California

- Double the most common form of dirt jumps. This consists of two separate earthworks, one acting as a takeoff (lip), and the other as a landing. Also known as a "gap" jump. They can be "Step-Ups", where the jump's up ramp is lower than the down ramp and the rider loses speed, or "Step-Downs", where the jump's down ramp is lower than the up ramp, meaning that they gain speed.
- Tabletops are more common among those new to the sport, they are a single earthwork with a takeoff at one end, and a landing at the other, with a flat 'table' on the top. These are favoured by new riders because when the rider comes up short they can still easily ride out of it.
- Ski jumps consist of just a takeoff, they're usually longer and flatter than other jumps, and tend to be situated on downhills, so the slope of the hill can serve as a landing. They're used mostly in competitions on jump length.
- Rollers are small tabletops that give you extra speed by 'pumping' the jump. They are usually found at the beginning of a trail.
- Step ups are ramps just before inclines. They enable riders to jump from the top of the incline to a raised landing.
- Whoops/rhythms a series of three or more small rounded ramps close together, enabling riders to 'manual' over them.
- Spine is a steep dirt jump with a take-off and a landing, but no table or gap, made to get higher air without distance.
- Berm a curved embankment that comes out of the ground. Mostly used on sharp turns, berms assist riders by giving them the ability to bank sharply, and make a sharper turn. Mainly used on downhill trails, but can also be present alongside dirt jumps to help riders avoid hitting trees. They are also used to maintain riders' speed without having to brake on turns. Some trails consist of jumps that lead into berms.
- Hip jumps consist of a jump with the landing 45 - 90 degrees left or right of the ramp, enabling transfers.
- Triple jumps consist of a take off, unused earthwork and a landing
- 360 berms consist of a large berm that goes just shy of 360 degrees, and is either jumped into and/or out of.

== Types of acrobatics ==
Name	Description
X-up	Turning the bars 180° or further without releasing the handle bars to make the riders arms form an X shape
Tabletop	While in the air tipping the bike on its side to a 90° angle or further.
Euro table	Sometimes called a Dark side, a euro table is when you turn your handlebars downwards instead of upwards as you would in a table.
Invert	Essentially a table, but over extended. Possibly enough for the front tire or fork to rub on your shoulder.
Whip	Keeping the front of your bike straight while flicking the back to one side. There are many different styles of whips, each depending on the style of the rider.
Turndown	Similar to an x-up but the entire body turns with the bars and the bike frame is as vertical as possible. Variation on the "cross-up" which incorporates elements of both the "Table" and X-up.
Unturndown	Similar to a turndown, but the rider doesn’t turn their bars.
ET	Pedaling forwards, one full rotation in the air
Tuck no hander	Both hands off the handlebars with your legs pinching top tube and your bars in your lap.
Suicide no hander	Hands behind back while in the air with legs pinching seat.
Tire grab	While in the air, the rider grabs his/hers front tire
Toboggan	One hand off handlebars touching the seat or top tube, one hand turning bars 90°. Tilt front down for extra style. Invented by Jeff Tabacchi (BMX Action Cover 1987)
No footer	Both feet off pedals.
No foot one hander	Both feet off pedals and one hand off the handlebars.
Nothing	Nothing is touching the bike, neither hands nor feet, hence the name.
Cannonball	Taking both feet off the pedals and grabbing the seat with both hands.
Can-can	One foot taken off and put over top tube to the other side of bike. First done by Mike Dominguez.
No-footed can-can	Similar to the can-can except done on both sides so that both legs are together, off the pedals and on the same side of the top tube
Nac-nac	Similar to the can-can, except your leg goes behind your other one still on the pedal, instead of in front.
360	Rotating the bike and rider completely round 360° horizontally until facing original direction. First 360 on a double was pulled by Chris Moeller.
Barspin	Using one hand to guide the handlebar around one full rotation (360 degrees). Invented by Chris Moeller.
Tail whip	Kicking the bike while holding the handlebars so that the frame makes a 360 degree rotation while the rider does not rotate
Superman	Taking both feet off the pedals and extending them outwards to resemble Superman in flight.
Superman seatgrab	A standard superman but with one hand on the seat rather than the handlebars.
Dangler	Only one foot on one pedal with both hands taken off the bars, a variation of the "3-star"
Truck driver	Doing a 360 and barspin combination, when the bars spin in the opposite direction of the 360.
Decade	Like a barspin, but person wraps around with the bars in a 360° position while tail stays straight.
Orbital 360	Like a regular 360, but the rider dips the front of the bike down so that both the rider and the bike are vertical during the rotation, the end of the rotation generally feels and looks a bit like a backflip.
California roll	Invented by Mike Montgomery, this is where the rider does a 360 around his bike, it is similar to a body varial however the rider does not touch the bike during the rotation.
Backflip	Rotating bike and rider completely upside down & continuing to rotate 360° of vertical rotation until facing original angle/direction. Can also be performed twice (while still in the air) to make a double back flip.
Front flip	Inverse of a back flip.
Superflip	Superman while backflipping.
Backflip tailwhip (flipwhip)	As the name suggests, doing a tailwhip whilst upside down (halfway through) a backflip. First attempted by Mat Hoffman in 1993 and landed in 2001 by Adam Strieby.
Special flip	Invented by "Special" Greg Powell from Nitro Circus. This is where the rider performs a backflip while the bike stays flat.
Tsunami Flip	While in the air, the bike is flipped behind the rider initially, with the rider remaining stationary, the rider then tucks backwards, rotating 360° onto the pedals.
Cashroll	Consists of doing a 180 into a corked backflip, into another 180 in the same rotation.

Variations and combinations of these tricks also exist, for example a 360° tabletop is where the rider spins 360° and does a tabletop.

== See also ==
- Cycling
- BMX bike
- Freestyle BMX
- Single track (mountain biking)
- Bunny hop (cycling)
- Glossary of cycling
