= Freestyle BMX =

Cycle sport

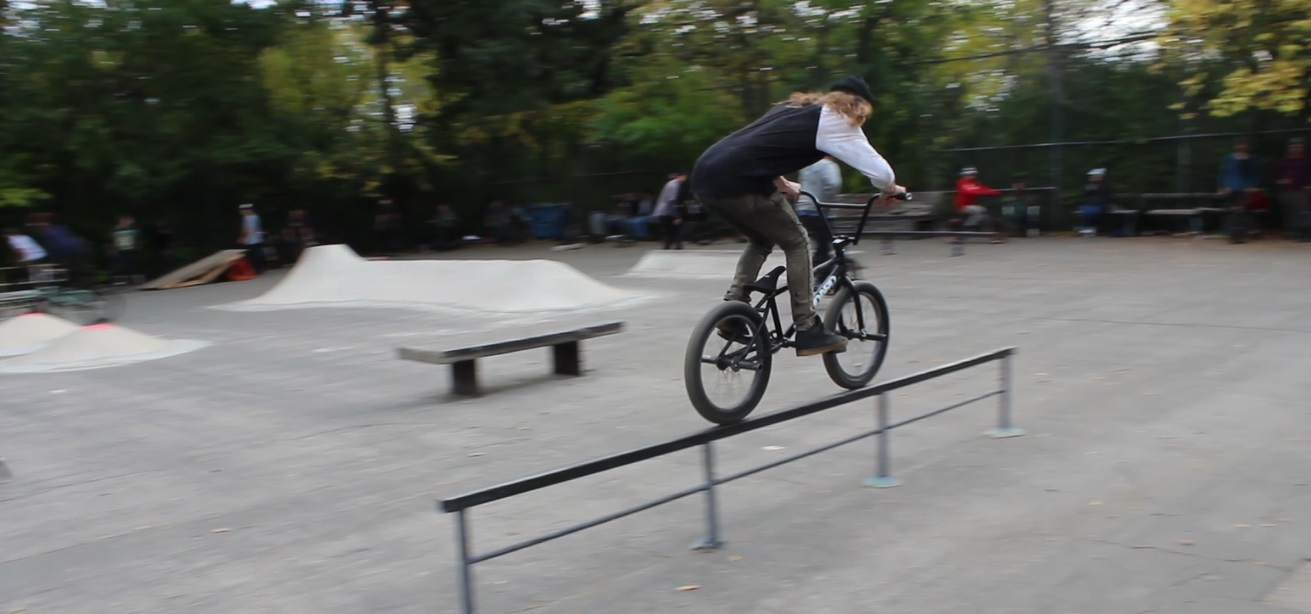
- Highest governing body: UCI

Characteristics
- Type: Cycle sport
- Equipment: BMX bike

Presence
- Country or region: Worldwide
- Olympic: since 2020

Pictogram for Cycling at the Summer Olympics

Freestyle BMX is bicycle motocross stunt riding on BMX bikes. It is an extreme sport descended from BMX racing that consists of four disciplines: street, park, trails, and flatland.

The sport emerged in the 1970s, but was first recognised by the Union Cycliste Internationale (UCI) in 2016. BMX Freestyle made its Olympic debut at the 2020 Summer Olympics.

== Early years ==
The earliest photographic documentation of BMX freestyle shows Devin and Todd Bank in 1974 riding BMX bikes on an eight foot tall skateboard ramp they built at their childhood home in West Los Angeles, California. This was the birth of BMX ramp riding. Devin Bank was also documented doing 360 degree freestyle spinning tricks on the street and also in the air by jumping off curbs. Skateboarder magazine then published photos of kids on bikes riding in empty household swimming pools in 1975. In 1975 kids started riding bikes in concrete reservoir channels in Escondido San Diego, California. In 1976 Devin and Todd Bank began riding BMX bikes inside the Runway Skatepark in Carson California. And, bike riders were also seen in 1976 riding at Carlsbad Skatepark in Carlsbad, California. Bob Haro and John Swanguen rode BMX bikes at Skateboard Heaven, a concrete skatepark in San Diego, California, late 1976. Later they transformed freestyle beyond skateparks by creating new bike tricks on flat streets. In the fall of 1977, Bob Haro was hired as a staff artist at BMX Action magazine where he be friended R.L. Osborn, son of the magazine publisher Bob Osborn. Haro and R.L. often practiced freestyle moves in their free time.

Freestyle BMX video

In the summer of 1978, Paramount, Lakewood, and other Southern California skateparks began reserving sessions or whole days exclusively for BMX bikes. BMX racer Tinker Juarez was innovating freestyle moves in vert bowls at Lakewood Ca Park, while William "Crazy Lacy" Furmage was innovating freestyle at the Paramount Ca Skatepark.

BMX Action magazine published the first freestyle how-to article in their January/February 1979 issue which showed Bob Haro doing a "rock walk".

BMX bike riders also performed a demonstration freestyle show in 1979 during a skate competition at Rocky Mountain Surf Skatepark in Salt Lake City, Utah.

Towards the end of 1979, William "Crazy Lacy" Furmage and Tony Ray Davis formed the Super Style II BMX Trick Team and later began performing freestyle shows at BMX races and other events. After the Super Style II BMX Trick Team became known, other organized trick teams were founded and quickly gained prominence. The freestyle movement at this point was all underground. Although several BMX manufacture-sponsored freestyle teams were touring the US, they were promoting the sport of BMX in general, not specifically freestyle.

The American Freestyle Association (AFA) was the first governing body for BMX freestyle, founded by Bob Morales in 1982.

Bob Osborn founded a slick quarterly magazine devoted solely to freestyle BMX. In the summer of 1984, Freestylin' magazine made its debut. The BMX world suddenly noticed the sport's massive potential. Manufacturers hurried to the drawing boards to develop new freestyle bikes, components, and accessories, and began searching for talented riders to sponsor. Bike shops began stocking freestyle products. The AFA began to put on organized flatland and quarter-pipe competitions.

== Peak and decline in popularity ==
From 1980 until 1987, freestyle BMX increased in popularity to a peak in 1987. During this period, the sport progressed with the release of new bike models, components, and accessories designed strictly for freestyle. For example, Haro released the Haro FST, Sport, and Master each year, with blazing graphical colors, new look, and new frame designs.

In the early 1990s, BMX freestyle suffered a decline in its commercial popularity; subsequently a number of large companies reduced or terminated their investment in the sport. In this economic climate, communities of new rider-owned companies and initiatives began to re-define the sport according to their own needs and interests, paving the way for what is now a largely new lead in the industry with clothing companies and material companies. This decline and subsequent new phase of the sport's development into an independently driven industry was notably referenced in the introduction to the BMX video Ride On (directed by Eddie Roman).

== Practice disciplines ==
Freestyle BMX riders participate in several well-established disciplines. As in the other forms of freestyle riding, there are no specific rules; style/aesthetics, skills, and creativity are emphasised.

=== Street ===
Street riders make use of urban and public spaces to perform tricks. These tricks can be performed on curbs, handrails, stairs, ledges, banks, and other obstacles. Styles among street riders vary, as riders often depend upon their urban surroundings. BMX street rose to prominence as an increasingly defined discipline in the late 1980s.

In modern BMX, the progression of more technical tricks on street obstacles has led to this discipline becoming more divided from other freestyle disciplines. BMX bikes aimed at street riding typically have steeper angles and shorter wheelbases, making them easier to maneuver, but less stable at the higher speeds associated with ramp and dirt riding.

Within street BMX there are a handful of competitions, however, the majority of professional street riders tend to focus on making videos for DVDs and YouTube videos on behalf of their sponsors. Only a handful of riders tend to focus on both, with competition courses and corporate sponsorships not considered 'core' street riding by many riders. One rider who has succeeded in both competitions and video projects is Garret Reynolds. Garret has won 13 X Games medals, as well as Ride BMX Nora Cup Awards for Video Part of The Year and Street Rider of the Year, and is largely considered one of the best BMX Street riders ever.

=== BMX Park ===
Park denotes the BMX discipline of exclusively riding skateparks, often with an emphasis on riding bowl transitions or jump boxes.

Skateparks are used by BMX riders as well as skateboarders, inline skaters and freestyle scooter-riders. Skateparks themselves can be made of wood, concrete or metal. Styles of riding will depend on the style of the parks. Wood is more suited to a flowing style, with riders searching for gaps and aiming to get the highest airs from the coping. Concrete parks usually tend to contain bowls and pools. However, it is not unusual for riders to merge the two styles in either type of park.

Concrete parks are commonly built outdoors due to their ability to withstand years of exposure to the elements of conditions. Concrete parks are also often publicly funded due to their permanent and low-cost nature in comparison to wood parks. Parks made from wood are popular with commercial skateparks, but harder to maintain, as the wood can start to decompose over time, or the features can be damaged through extensive use. Wooden parks are often considered safer than concrete, as during an impact, the wooden surface deflects by a small amount, in contrast to concrete, which is inelastic. Parks designed with BMX use in mind will typically have steel coping along the side that is less prone to damage than concrete or pool coping.

There are a number of competitions that focus on the BMX park discipline, with X Games typically focusing on progressive tricks and large jumps, and other competitions such as the Vans BMX Pro Cup focusing more on flowing and stylish riding on bowl style courses.

In June 2017, the Olympic Committee announced that BMX freestyle park would be featured at the Summer 2020 Tokyo Olympic Games.

=== Vert Ramp ===
Vert ramp

Vert is a freestyle BMX discipline performed in a half pipe consisting of two quarter pipes set facing each other (much like a mini ramp), but at around 10–15 feet tall (around 2.5 to 3.5 meters high). The biggest ramp ever used in competition is the X-Games big air ramp at 27 feet (8.2 m) tall. Both ‘faces’ of the ramp have an extension to the transition that is vertical, hence the name. Coping is a round metal tube at the lip of the vert that helps freestyle BMXers do grinds, and stalls on the lip of the vert.

Riders go up each jump, performing air tricks before landing into the transition having turned 180 degrees. A typical run involves going from one side to the other, airing above the coping each side. Also possible are 'lip tricks' - tricks on the platform at the top of the ramps before dropping into the ramp. Many tricks consist of the rider grabbing a part of the bike or removing body parts off the bike.

=== Trails ===
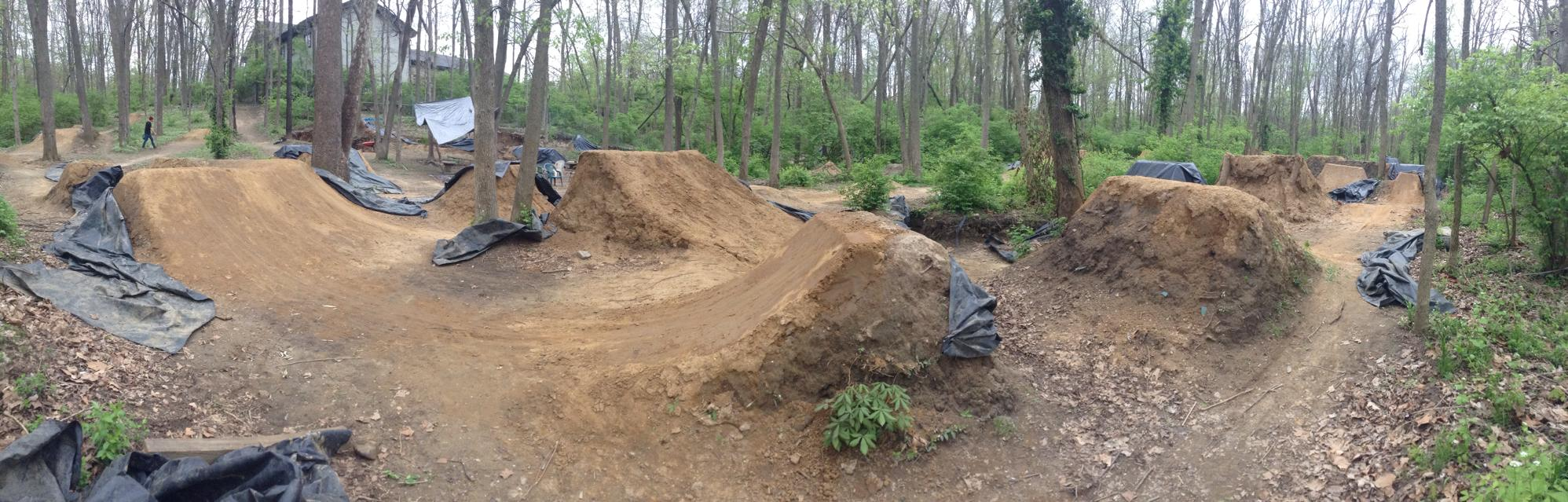
Freshly faced dirt jumps at a set of BMX trails in Indiana

Trails are paths that lead to jumps made of heavily compacted dirt. Jumps in the same path, or "line", are sometimes referred to as packs, such as a four pack, a six pack, or an eight pack, which would have two, three, and four jumps respectively. A dirt jump consists of a steep take off, called a lip, with an often slightly less steep landing. The lip and landing are usually built as separate mounds, divided by a gap. The gap is measured from the topmost part of the lip, horizontally to the topmost part of the far side of the landing. Gaps typically range from only a couple of feet to over twenty feet. A moderate gap is around twelve feet.

Trails riding is sometimes also referred to as "dirt jumping". Most trails riders maintain that a subtle difference exists in the style and flow of "dirt jumps" and "trails"; trails riders focus more on a flowing smooth style from one jump to the next while performing other stylish tricks, while dirt jumpers try to perform the craziest tricks they can over larger, less flow-oriented jumps.

Trails riders usually run a rear brake only as they have no use for a front brake, and usually a rotor (gyro) to make it easier to do barspins, so they do not have to spin the bars back the other way to untangle them, which is hard to do on trails. In general, trail/dirt jumping bikes have longer wheelbases (chainstays) than other BMX bikes to aid with stability in mid-air.

=== Flatland ===
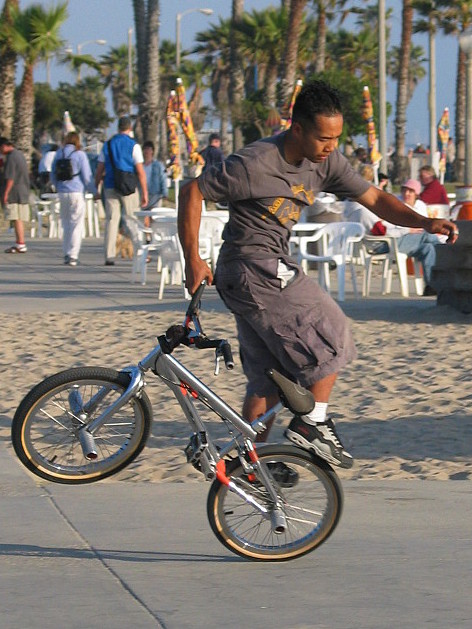
BMX Flatland rider Caleb Rider at Santa Monica beach

Flatland BMX occupies a position somewhat removed from the rest of freestyle BMX. People who ride in the above disciplines will generally take part in at least one of the others, but flatlanders tend to only ride flatland. They are often very dedicated and will spend several hours a day perfecting their technique.

Flatland also differs from the others in that the terrain used is nothing but a smooth, flat surface (e.g. an asphalt parking lot, basketball courts, etc.). Tricks are performed by spinning and balancing in a variety of body and bicycle positions. Riders almost always use knurled aluminum pegs to stand on to manipulate the bike into even stranger positions.

Flatland bikes typically have a shorter wheelbase than other freestyle bikes. Flatland bikes differ from dirt jumping bikes and freestyle bikes in one way. The frames are often more heavily reinforced because the people riding flatland often stand on the frames. This shorter wheelbase requires less effort to make the bike spin or to position the bike on one wheel. One of the primary reasons flat landers often ride only on flatland is the decreased stability of a shorter bike on ramps, dirt courses and streets.

A variety of options are commonly found on flatland bikes, because it is in an open space. The most unifying feature of flatland bikes is the use of four pegs, one on the end of each wheel axle. Flatland riders will choose to run either a front brake, a rear brake, both brakes, or no brakes at all, depending on stylistic preference.

== Tricks ==
=== Air tricks ===
These tricks take place in the air. Freestyle dirt BMX involves many air tricks.

- 180° jump: The rider and bike spin 180° in the air and land backwards, in what is called fakie (riding backwards).
- 360 windshield wiper: the rider does a 360 downside tailwhip (Decade) then an opposite tailwhip in one air.
- 360° jump: The rider and bike spin 360°.
- 360° nose tap: rider does a 360 then inverts into a nose tap on a bench, box, ramp, etc.
- 540 cab: The rider fakies/rollouts and makes a 540 degree rotation, with no need to finish to fakie/rollout.
- 540 tailwhip: The rider does a 540 in the air then a tailwhip.
- 540° aerial: The rider picks up the bike and spins it 540 degrees.
- 720: two 360's in one jump.
- 720° jump: Rider and bike spin 720°.
- 900° aerial: Rider and bike spin 900°.
- 1260° aerial: Rider and bike spin 1260°.
- 1440° jump: Rider and bike spin 1440°.
- Backflip: Both rider and bike do a backward flip while in midair.
- Barhop: The rider kicks both legs over the handlebar crossbar.
- Barspin: Spinning the handle bars one full rotation around and catching them.
- Bikeflip: The rider flips their bicycle without moving their body in mid air.
- Bus Driver: A unique variation of the barspin, spinning the handle bars one full rotation around while keeping 1 hand on the bars to spin them like a bus steering wheel and catching them.
- Can can: The rider brings a foot over the bike's top tube to the other side.
- Candy bar: The rider takes 1 foot off the pedal and puts it over the bar making the shape of a candy cane with their legs.
- Candybar: The rider kicks one leg over the handlebar crossbar.
- Carcrash/Helicopter: barspin and a crankflip
- Cash roll: Invented by Daniel Dhers, similar to a 360 backflip but instead of rotating while upside-down the rider does a 180-backflip-180.
- Crankflip: The rider bunny hops and kicks the pedals backwards so the crank arms spin one full crank around and then the feet catch back onto the pedals to stop the cranks.
- Decade: Similar to the flatland decade, the riders throw themselves around the bike while still holding on the handlebars before coming back round to meet the bike and land on the pedals.
- Disaster: A rider jumps and purposely lands the back tire and sprocket on a ledge or ramp, usually done on a quarter pipe from a 180.
- Dive Bomber: A variation of the Superman created by James Hirst where the rider becomes inverted and taps their nose on the front tire.
- Double Peg Stall: the rider jumps and lands the pegs on a ledge without grinding and balances in a still position.
- ET: The rider is in mid air and pedals one full crank as though they are riding normally.
- Fast plant: A rider jumps or rides off a ramp and plants their foot down quickly. This is usually done on a gap or ramp and tied with a 180 coming out of a ramp.
- Flair: Both rider and bike do a backflip combined with a 180, to land facing back down the ramp. Usually performed on a quarter pipe.
- Frontflip: Both rider and bike do a forward flip while in midair.
- Full cab: The rider fakies/rollouts and makes a 360 degree rotation, making the bike return in the same position, and having to finish the fakie/rollout.
- Gap: Jumping over a gap.
- Half cab: The rider fakies/rollouts and makes a 180 degree rotation, completing the fakie, rollout.
- Invert: Bringing the bike up to one side without turning the bars.
- Jeep Driver: A unique variation of the barspin, grabbing the crossbar and spinning the handle bars one full rotation around and catching them.
- Lookback: Similar to the turn down, the rider turns the handlebar and his body to one side, while the frame wraps itself to the rider's legs, turning to the other side. On vert ramps, it's done in aerials, and the rider seems to be 'looking back', hence the name.
- Nac nac: The rider bring one foot over the back tire to the other side while whipping out the back end of the bike.
- Ninja Drop/caveman: A standing rider holds the bars and seat of the bike over a ramp or drop, then jumps into the air and on the bike, landing in a riding position.
- No-footed can: The rider does a can can but takes the other foot off the pedal as well, so that both legs are on one side of the bike.
- No-footed nac: The rider does a nac nac but takes the other foot off the pedal as well, so that both legs are on one side of the bike.
- No Hander: The rider tucks in the handlebars and takes both hands off.
- Nothing: The rider lets go of the handlebars and pedal at the same time in mid air.
- One-handed X-up: The rider takes off 1 hand and turns the bars at least 180 degrees, so the arms are crossed and then turns them back.
- Pedal grab: The rider grabs a pedal.
- Peg grab: The rider grabs a peg, usually on the front of their bike. Also known as a lucky dip.
- Running Man: A rider jumps towards a wall, taking both feet off the bike, runs on the wall, then jumps back on the bike.
- Sprocket stall: A rider jumps and lands on the sprocket, usually done with a guarded sprocket to reduce wear on the bike.
- Suicide Barspin: A variation of the Suicide no-hander where the rider spins the bars in a 360 degree rotation while stretching out their hands.
- Suicide no-hander: The rider lets go of only the handle bars similar to a tuck no-hander, but rather stretches their arms out to the sides without tucking the bike while pinching the seat with knees.
- Superman: The rider removes both feet and extends them outwards to resemble Superman in flight.
- Superman seat grab: A variation of the superman where the rider takes one hand off the handle bars and grabs the seat while extending their body before grabbing back on to the bars and landing
- Tabletop: While in the air the rider will bring the bike up to one side of them by turning the handlebars and using body movement making the bike look like it is flat like the top of a table. Commonly confused with the "invert" trick which does not include much turning of the bars, but still executes the move in a tabletop manner.
- Tailwhip: The rider throws the bike out to one side while still holding onto the handle bars so that the frame goes 360° around the steering tube; the rider then catches the frame again and stands back on the pedals. Variations include the double whip, triple whip, etc.
- TE/Chainsaw: The rider is in mid air and pedals backwards one full crank quickly. Basically an ET, but in reverse.
- Tire grab: The rider grabs the front tire.
- Toboggan (often abbreviated as T-bog): The rider takes one hand off the bars and turns the bars and grabs their seat, then returns their hand to the bars before landing.
- Transfer: A transfer is when you go up one ramp then go onto another ramp.
- Truckdriver: The rider spins the bike 360 degrees whilst doing a barspin in the opposite direction while in mid air.
- Turn down: On a vert ramp, the rider turns the handlebars downwards and into their legs, wrapping them around the frame, while the frame itself still points up.
- Wall ride: A rider jumps and rides on a wall, then rides or jumps off.
- X-up: The rider turns the bars at least 180 degrees, so the arms are crossed and then turns them back.
- X-down: The rider turns the bars in the opposite direction to an X-up at least 180 degrees, so the arms are crossed and then turns them back.

Variations and combinations of these tricks also exist, for example a 360° tailwhip would be where the rider spins 360° in one direction and the frame of the bike spins 360° around the steer tube, both bike and rider will then meet again, with the rider catching the pedals, facing the same direction as before the trick.

=== Flatland tricks ===
BMX flatland tricks usually involve much balance, more often than not with only one wheel in contact with the ground.

- Bunny hop: A bunny hop is achieved when a rider jumps the bike into the air from flat ground (this can also be done close to the lip of ramp to gain more height) so that neither wheels are touching the ground.
- Dork manual: When rider puts one foot on the peg, and the other foot in the air, controlling balance, and ride down the street in a manual with the foot on the peg.
- Endo: Basic flatland trick where the rider uses the front brake or a curb to lift the back wheel and balance on the front tire.
- Fakie: When the rider is riding backwards and pedaling in an anti-clockwise direction with the sprocket movement or coasting as you are moving backwards then at the right point turning your bars the opposite direction you want to turn and sliding out so you are riding forward again.
- Footjam: The rider jams their foot between the forks and tire, stopping the bike, and he balances with the back tire airborne.
- Footjam tailwhip: The rider jams their foot in the fork to start a foot jam endo then kicks the tail of the bike around. When the tail of the bike goes 360 degrees the rider puts their foot back on the pedals. An alternate trick is to jump the frame as it comes around repeatedly until the rider elects to put their foot back on the pedals.
- Fork manual: When a rider puts one foot on the front peg and spins the handlebars around, to lift the bike up into a fakie manual, with both feet on pegs.
- Front or Back Pogos: Basic flatland trick where the rider stands on the wheel pegs (front or back), locks the wheel's brake, and hops with the other wheel in the air.
- Grip ride: The rider jumps their feet from the pedals to the top of the handle bars then releases their hands to stand up while steering with their feet.
- Hang-5: The rider performs a nose manual whilst having one foot on the front axle peg and the other foot dangling, usually used to keep balance and steady.
- Indian giver: This is where the rider naturally or purposely fakies/rollouts in the opposite direction than the way of that they spun in. This is usually easily fixed by learning how to fakie/rollout the correct way, thus making the execution and finishing look cleaner.
- Manual: A step-up from the wheelie, the manual is essentially the same only the rider does not pedal; this makes the trick more difficult to perform as point of balance between the front and back of the bike has to be reached. Professional riders can often do this until their bike runs out of momentum.
- Miami Hop: Endo to Pogo on front wheel turned sideways rather than on rear wheel upright, best executed with Z-Rims or mags.
- Nose manual: The same concept as a manual, only performed with the back wheel in the air and the front wheel on the ground.
- Pogo: The most popular advanced basic trick. Created in the 80's, it is executed by swinging the bike to a vertical position on its rear wheel while the rider sits and hops on it to maintain balance.
- Steamroller: An Advanced trick. The rider stands on one front peg, and sends the bike to front with their other foot, then balances on one wheel while holding the body of bike with one hand and moving at front.
- Time machine: An extremely hard trick. Rider stands on one back peg, then starts to make a manual, after balances it, changes hands on bar while manualing and grabs the front peg with their free hand. After that, rider starts to turn at extremely high speed as if they are drawing an "O" on the ground.
- Wheelie or Catwalk: The most basic of flatland tricks, the wheelie is when the rider rides the bike on only the back wheel whilst pedaling.

== Olympic medalists in freestyle BMX ==
=== Park ===
Men

Event	Gold	Silver	Bronze
2020	Logan Martin; Australia	Daniel Dhers; Venezuela	Declan Brooks; Great Britain
2024	José Torres; Argentina	Kieran Reilly; Great Britain	Anthony Jeanjean; France
2028			

Women

Event	Gold	Silver	Bronze
2020	Charlotte Worthington; Great Britain	Hannah Roberts; United States	Nikita Ducarroz; Switzerland
2024	Deng Yawen; China	Perris Benegas; United States	Natalya Diehm; Australia
2028			

== See also ==
- BMX
- BMX bike
- Street trials
- Cycling
- Glossary of cycling
