= Cycling at the 2024 Summer Olympics =

Cycling at the Games of the XXXIII Olympiad
- Pictograms from top, left to right: BMX freestyle, BMX racing, road, mountain biking, and track cycling.
- Venue: Pont d'Iéna (road race); Vélodrome de Saint-Quentin-en-Yvelines (track and BMX racing); Élancourt Hill (mountain biking); Invalides (road time trial start); Place de la Concorde (BMX freestyle); Pont Alexandre III (road time trial finish); Polygone de Vincennes (road training)
- Dates: 27 July – 11 August 2024
- No. of events: 22 (11 men, 11 women)
- Competitors: 514

The cycling competitions of the 2024 Summer Olympics in Paris occurred at four venues (Pont d'Iéna for road and time trial races; Vélodrome de Saint-Quentin-en-Yvelines for track cycling and BMX racing; Élancourt Hill for mountain biking; and Place de la Concorde for the BMX freestyle), from 27 July to 11 August, featuring twenty-two events across five disciplines.

Cycling competitions have been contested in every Summer Olympics edition since the modern Olympiad revived in 1896, along with athletics, artistic gymnastics, fencing and swimming.

A total of 514 cyclists have competed at Paris 2024 with an equal split between men and women for the first time in the sport's history, attaining the goal of gender equality as one of the objectives ratified by the Union Cycliste Internationale (UCI). Having already been achieved in mountain biking, BMX racing, and BMX freestyle on the Tokyo 2020 program, several significant changes were instituted in the road and track cycling, with some men's quota places transferred to the women's side and with the number of riders in women's team sprint increasing from two to three. Conforming to the recommendations of the International Olympic Committee's 2020 agenda, cycling had fourteen fewer places at these Games than those in 2020, a reduction that affected road racing and mountain biking. Nonetheless, the distribution of an extra place for track cycling and six in BMX freestyle, with the number of athletes competing in the men's and women's events increasing from nine to twelve, partly counteracted the moderate decrease in the cycling spots offered at these Games.

Despite the modest quota decrease, cycling featured a total of twenty-two medal events across five disciplines, similar to the 2020 program format. While the sport continued to run on all days between the opening and closing ceremonies, Paris 2024 witnessed some scheduling changes contrary to the previous edition; hence, the men's and women's individual time trial medalists were awarded on the first day of the competition.

For road cycling there was a special training venue, Polygone de Vincennes, so the cyclists were not dependent on the (busy) roads of Paris.

The 20-year reign of Great Britain at the top of the Olympic cycling table was finally broken, as home nation France topped a tightly contested table with three gold medals, tied with Australia, Netherlands, United States, with Belgium, New Zealand and Great Britain just one gold medal behind. Despite the significant drop in gold medals, Great Britain won the most overall medals, with 11.

== Qualification ==
As the host country, France reserved a men's and women's quota place in BMX racing, BMX freestyle, and mountain biking; and two more in the men's and women's road races. When one or two French cyclists qualify directly and regularly, their spare slots were reallocated to the next highest-ranked eligible NOCs in the aforementioned events based on the national order of the UCI World Ranking list by October 17, 2023.

About ninety percent of the total quota places were attributed through the UCI World Ranking lists of their respective disciplines, with some spots offered for the cyclists at the 2023 UCI World Championships and at continental qualification tournaments (Africa, Asia, and the Americas).

== Competition schedule ==
Legend
H	Heats/preliminaries	¼	Quarter-finals	LC	Last chance run	½	Semi-finals	F	Final

BMX, mountain biking and road cycling
Event↓/Date →	Sat 27	Sun 28	Mon 29	Tue 30	Wed 31	Thu 1		Fri 2		Sat 3	Sun 4
BMX
Men's freestyle				Q	F						
Men's racing						¼	LC	½	F		
Women's freestyle				Q	F						
Women's racing						¼	LC	½	F		
Mountain biking
Men's cross-country			F								
Women's cross-country		F									
Road cycling
Men's road race										F	
Men's time trial	F										
Women's road race											F
Women's time trial	F										

Track cycling
Event↓/Date →	Mon 5			Tue 6		Wed 7		Thu 8				Fri 9		Sat 10		Sun 11			
	A			A		M	A	A				M	A	A		A			
Men's sprint						H		¼				½	F						
Men's team sprint	H			½	F														
Men's keirin														H		¼		½	F
Men's team pursuit	H			½			F												
Men's omnium								SR	TR	ER	PR								
Men's madison														F					
Women's sprint												H			¼	½		F	
Women's team sprint	H	½	F																
Women's keirin						H		¼		½	F								
Women's team pursuit				H		½	F												
Women's omnium																SR	TR	ER	PR
Women's madison												F							

M = Morning session, A = Afternoon session
SR = Scratch race, TR = Tempo race, ER = Elimination race, PR = Points race

== Participation ==
In total of 514 quotas and 267 cyclists from 75 NOCs:

- Afghanistan (2)
- Algeria (2)
- Argentina (2)
- Aruba (1)
- Australia (21)
- Austria (9)
- Belgium (22)
- Brazil (6)
- Burkina Faso (1)
- Canada (22)
- Chile (3)
- China (9)
- Colombia (15)
- Costa Rica (2)
- Cuba (1)
- Cyprus (1)
- Czech Republic (6)
- Denmark (16)
- Ecuador (2)
- Egypt (3)
- Eritrea (1)
- Estonia (2)
- Finland (2)
- France (31) Host
- Germany (24)
- Great Britain (30)
- Greece (1)
- Hong Kong (2)
- Hungary (3)
- Individual Neutral Athletes (3)
- Indonesia (1)
- Iran (1)
- Ireland (7)
- Israel (4)
- Italy (21)
- Japan (18)
- Kazakhstan (3)
- Latvia (6)
- Liechtenstein (1)
- Lithuania (3)
- Luxembourg (2)
- Malaysia (4)
- Mauritius (3)
- Mexico (8)
- Mongolia (1)
- Morocco (2)
- Namibia (2)
- Netherlands (21)
- New Zealand (23)
- Nigeria (1)
- Norway (6)
- Panama (1)
- Poland (13)
- Portugal (7)
- Romania (1)
- Rwanda (3)
- Serbia (2)
- Slovakia (2)
- Slovenia (7)
- South Africa (7)
- South Korea (2)
- Spain (9)
- Suriname (1)
- Sweden (3)
- Switzerland (18)
- Thailand (4)
- Trinidad and Tobago (1)
- Turkey (1)
- Uganda (1)
- Ukraine (4)
- United Arab Emirates (1)
- United States (23)
- Uruguay (1)
- Uzbekistan (3)
- Venezuela (1)
- Vietnam (1)

== Medal summary ==
=== Medal table ===
* Host nation (France)

Rank	NOC	Gold	Silver	Bronze	Total
1	France*	3	3	3	9
2	Netherlands	3	3	1	7
3	Australia	3	2	3	8
4	United States	3	2	1	6
5	Great Britain	2	5	4	11
6	New Zealand	2	2	1	5
7	Belgium	2	0	3	5
8	Italy	1	2	1	4
9	Portugal	1	1	0	2
10	Argentina	1	0	0	1
10	China	1	0	0	1
12	Germany	0	1	1	2
13	Poland	0	1	0	1
14	Denmark	0	0	1	1
14	South Africa	0	0	1	1
14	Sweden	0	0	1	1
14	Switzerland	0	0	1	1
Totals (17 entries)		22	22	22	66

=== Road cycling ===
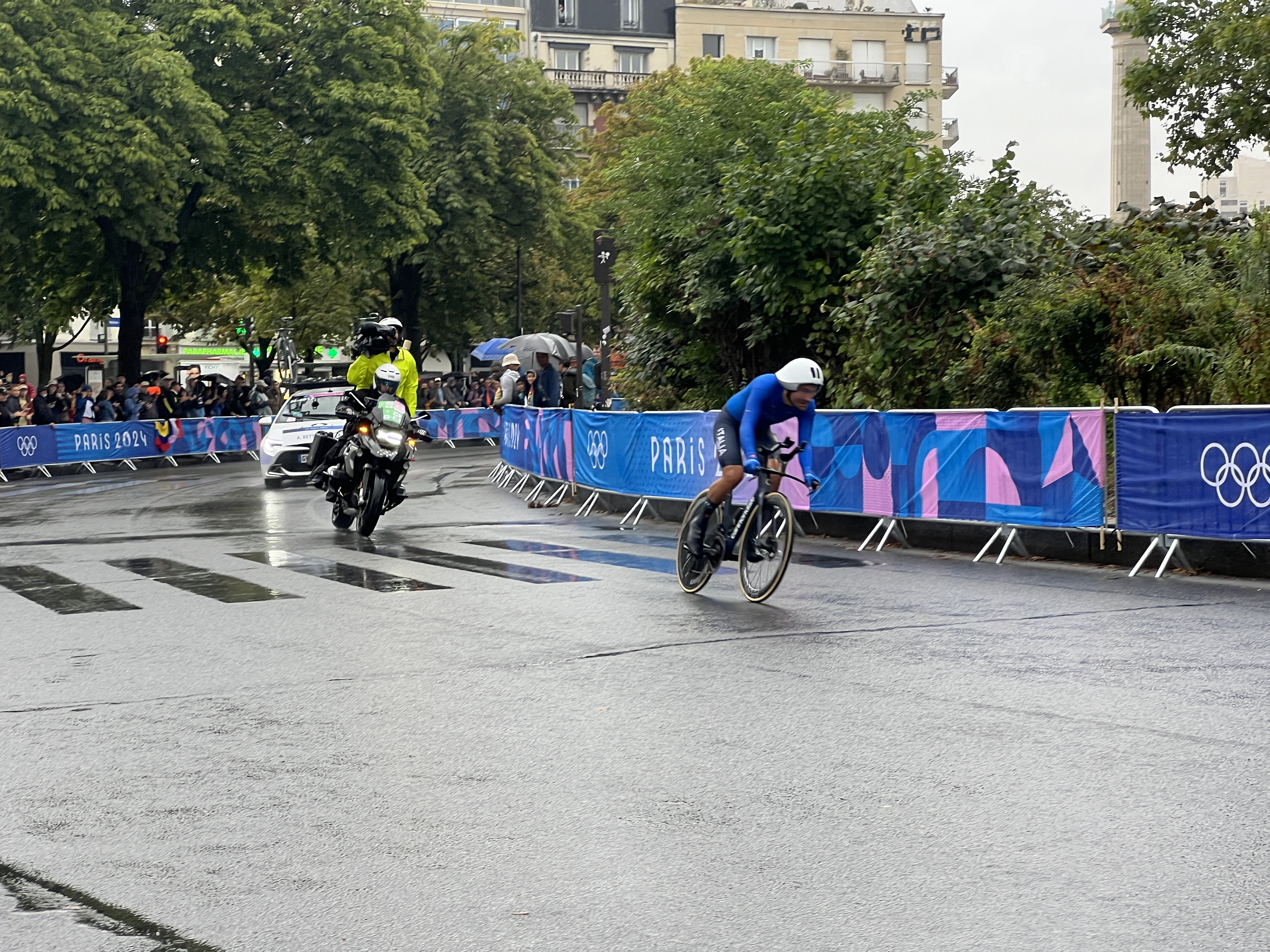
During the time trial

Event	Gold	Silver	Bronze
Men's road race	Remco Evenepoel; Belgium	Valentin Madouas; France	Christophe Laporte; France
Men's time trial	Remco Evenepoel; Belgium	Filippo Ganna; Italy	Wout van Aert; Belgium
Women's road race	Kristen Faulkner; United States	Marianne Vos; Netherlands	Lotte Kopecky; Belgium
Women's time trial	Grace Brown; Australia	Anna Henderson; Great Britain	Chloé Dygert; United States

=== Track cycling ===
==== Men's ====
Event	Gold	Silver	Bronze
Sprint	Harrie Lavreysen; Netherlands	Matthew Richardson; Australia	Jack Carlin; Great Britain
Team sprint	Netherlands; Roy van den Berg; Harrie Lavreysen; Jeffrey Hoogland	Great Britain; Ed Lowe; Hamish Turnbull; Jack Carlin	Australia; Leigh Hoffman; Matthew Richardson; Matthew Glaetzer
Keirin	Harrie Lavreysen; Netherlands	Matthew Richardson; Australia	Matthew Glaetzer; Australia
Madison	Portugal; Iúri Leitão; Rui Oliveira	Italy; Simone Consonni; Elia Viviani	Denmark; Niklas Larsen; Michael Mørkøv
Omnium	Benjamin Thomas; France	Iúri Leitão; Portugal	Fabio Van den Bossche; Belgium
Team pursuit	Australia; Oliver Bleddyn; Sam Welsford; Conor Leahy; Kelland O'Brien	Great Britain; Ethan Hayter; Daniel Bigham; Charlie Tanfield; Ethan Vernon; Oliver Wood	Italy; Simone Consonni; Filippo Ganna; Francesco Lamon; Jonathan Milan

==== Women's ====
Event	Gold	Silver	Bronze
Sprint	Ellesse Andrews; New Zealand	Lea Friedrich; Germany	Emma Finucane; Great Britain
Team sprint	Great Britain; Katy Marchant; Sophie Capewell; Emma Finucane	New Zealand; Rebecca Petch; Shaane Fulton; Ellesse Andrews	Germany; Pauline Grabosch; Emma Hinze; Lea Sophie Friedrich
Keirin	Ellesse Andrews; New Zealand	Hetty van de Wouw; Netherlands	Emma Finucane; Great Britain
Madison	Italy; Chiara Consonni; Vittoria Guazzini	Great Britain; Elinor Barker; Neah Evans	Netherlands; Maike van der Duin; Lisa van Belle
Omnium	Jennifer Valente; United States	Daria Pikulik; Poland	Ally Wollaston; New Zealand
Team pursuit	United States; Jennifer Valente; Lily Williams; Chloé Dygert; Kristen Faulkner	New Zealand; Ally Wollaston; Bryony Botha; Emily Shearman; Nicole Shields	Great Britain; Elinor Barker; Josie Knight; Anna Morris; Jessica Roberts

=== Mountain biking ===
Event	Gold	Silver	Bronze
Men's cross-country	Tom Pidcock; Great Britain	Victor Koretzky; France	Alan Hatherly; South Africa
Women's cross-country	Pauline Ferrand-Prévot; France	Haley Batten; United States	Jenny Rissveds; Sweden

=== BMX ===
Event	Gold	Silver	Bronze
Men's race	Joris Daudet; France	Sylvain André; France	Romain Mahieu; France
Women's race	Saya Sakakibara; Australia	Manon Veenstra; Netherlands	Zoé Claessens; Switzerland
Men's freestyle	José Torres; Argentina	Kieran Reilly; Great Britain	Anthony Jeanjean; France
Women's freestyle	Deng Yawen; China	Perris Benegas; United States	Natalya Diehm; Australia

== See also ==
- Cycling at the 2023 European Games
- Cycling at the 2023 Pan American Games
- Cycling at the 2024 Summer Paralympics
