= Cycling in China =

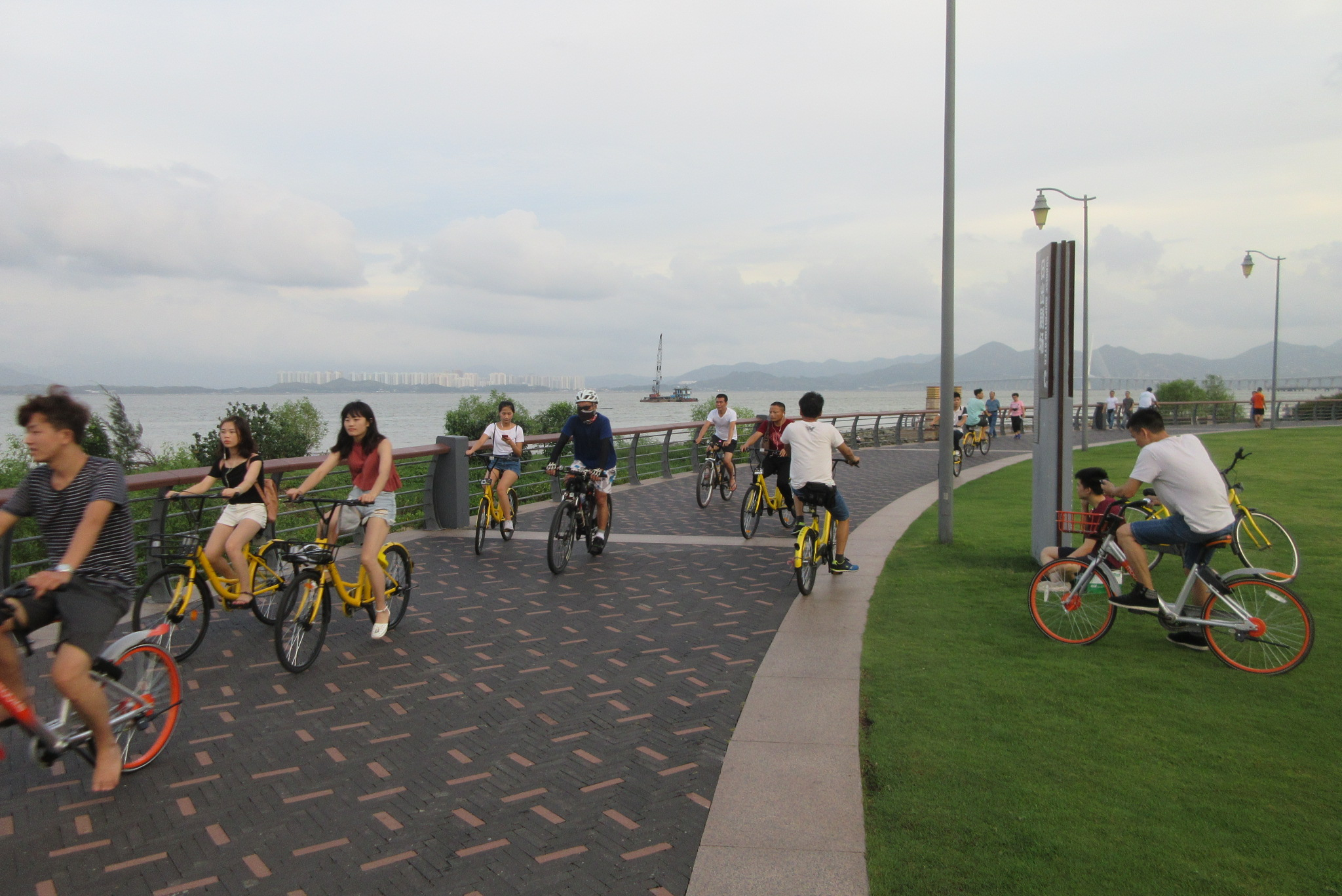
Cyclists at a park in Shenzhen, 2017

Cycling is a common form of transportation and recreation in China, although use of bicycles has significantly declined since the 1970s and 1980s, when the country was nicknamed the "Kingdom of Bicycles" (自行车王国; Zìxíngchē wángguó). Although some early velocipedes were introduced to China from Europe beginning in the 1860s, cycling remained limited to a relatively small group of westerners residing in the country until the first decade of the 20th century, where bicycles began seeing limited use in Shanghai and other metropolitan centers. Steadily rising in popularity among the emerging middle class during the 1920s and 1930s, they became commonplace during the Maoist era as factories began producing large numbers of bicycles, and alternatives such as rickshaws and pedicabs fell out of use.

Previously limited by a rationing system and high prices, bicycles became generally available to the working class following economic reforms in the late 1970s and 1980s. Urban redevelopment, the abolition of the work unit system and the increasing availability of private automobiles and mass transit have significantly contributed to a decline in bicycle commuting between 2000 and 2010, with the number of Shanghai workers commuting by bicycle dropping by more than half. Cycling is generally seen as less prestigious than other forms of transportation, with associations with older generations and the Mao era.

China remains the largest producer and consumer of electric bikes. Bicycle-sharing systems have proliferated across the country over the course of the 2010s, represented both by public government-sponsored ventures and private companies such as Ofo and Mobike. The sector later underwent consolidation with many early operators exiting the market and surviving systems becoming integrated into larger platform ecosystems. Cycle sport was traditionally underrepresented in China on an international level, although Chinese teams saw increasing success at the Olympic Games during the early 21st century, seeing the first gold medal in the sport at the 2016 Summer Olympics. Sport cycling is managed by the Chinese Cycling Association, an organization managed de facto by the Cycling Department of the General Administration of Sport's National Cycling and Fencing Management Center.

== History ==
Early bicycles and similar velocipede predecessors (such as the draisienne) were introduced to China from Europe by the late 1860s, with their use reported in an 1868 issue of the Shanghai Xinbao newspaper. Cycling in China was mainly limited to westerners during the 19th century; bicycles' cost and difficulty of use on bumpy roads discouraged Chinese consumers, and the domestic elite shunned them in favor of rickshaws and the traditional sedan chair. They found some use among western missionaries, who found them useful for navigating the rural countryside.

=== Emergence ===
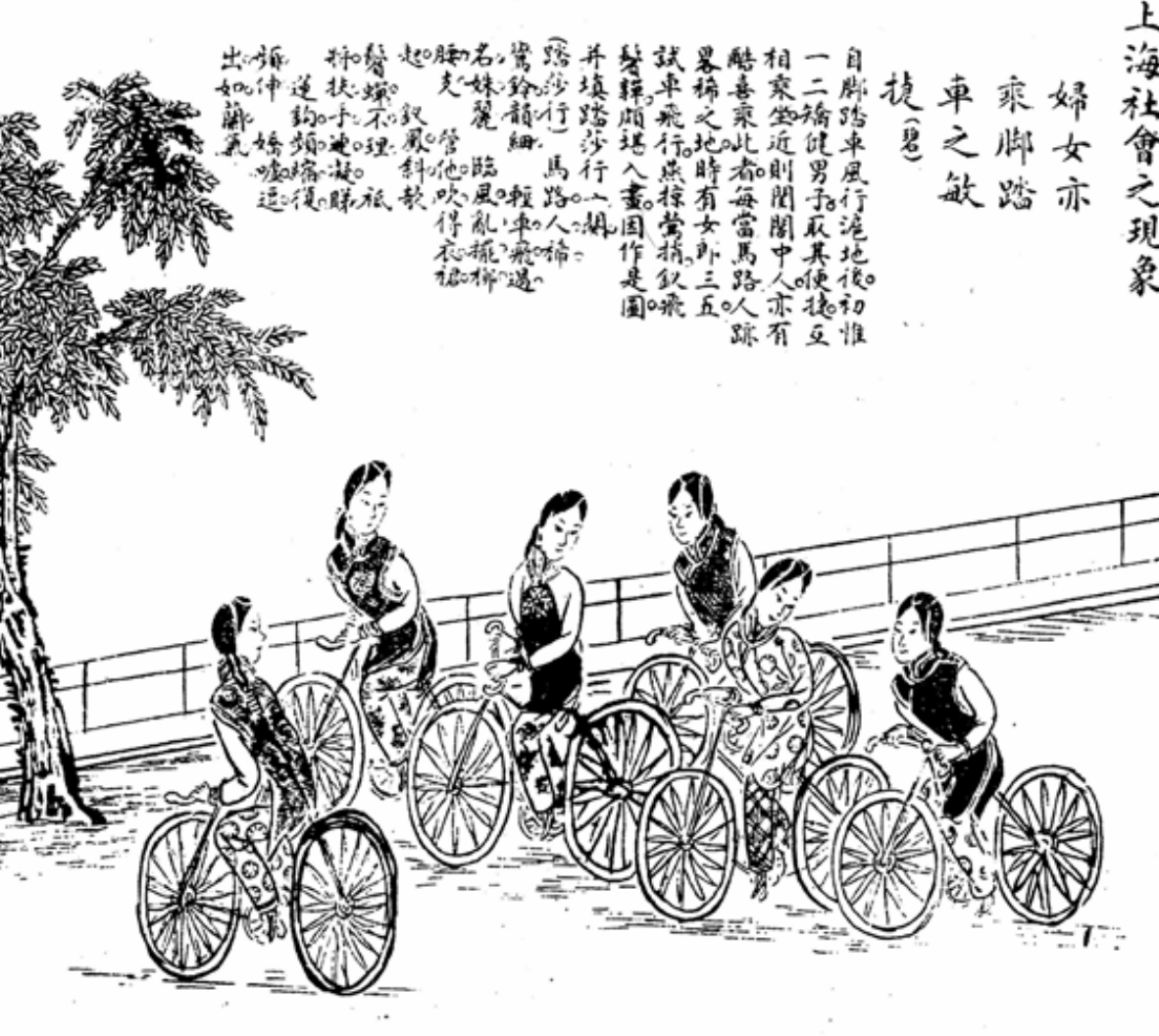
Female bicyclists, depicted in a 1909–1910 issue of Tuhua Ribao

Shanghai, highly connected to the west and home to the Shanghai International Settlement, emerged as an early center of cycling. The Tongchang Vehicle Company, the first bike shop in China, opened in the city in 1897. Five or six more shops were opened in the Shanghai foreign concessions over the following three years, and some rickshaw and carriage shops began to additionally offer bicycle parts and repairs. Students and postal workers in Shanghai were prominent early adopters of cycling, and the practice became a prominent social symbol of modernity. Although spreading to major cities such as Chengdu and Guangzhou before 1910, they remained an imported luxury rare in comparison to other forms of other transportation. A 1918 traffic survey of an intersection in the Shanghai International Settlement recorded 14,663 rickshaws, 1,836 automobiles, 942 horse-drawn carriages, and 772 bicycles.

Cycling rose in popularity during the 1920s and 1930s. Although rickshaws remained the dominant form of transportation in cities, cycling was seen as a practical choice for the emerging middle class, although prohibitively expensive for peasants and the urban working class. They saw increasing use outside of cities during the 1920s, mainly by merchants, clerks, and government workers. Bicycles continued to be largely imported from the United Kingdom and Germany, although they were joined by domestically produced models such as the Tongchang Company's Feiren. Intense gasoline shortages during the Second Sino-Japanese War saw the rise of the pedicab, a pedal-powered version of the rickshaw which displaced both automobiles and traditional foot-driven rickshaws. Bicycle use also increased during the war; between 1929 and 1948, bicycle ownership in Shanghai increased from around 40,000 to 230,000. In the Japanese-occupied territories, the industrialist Kojima Kazusaburo founded three bicycle factories; these formed the core of China's domestic bicycle production after the war.

=== Proliferation ===
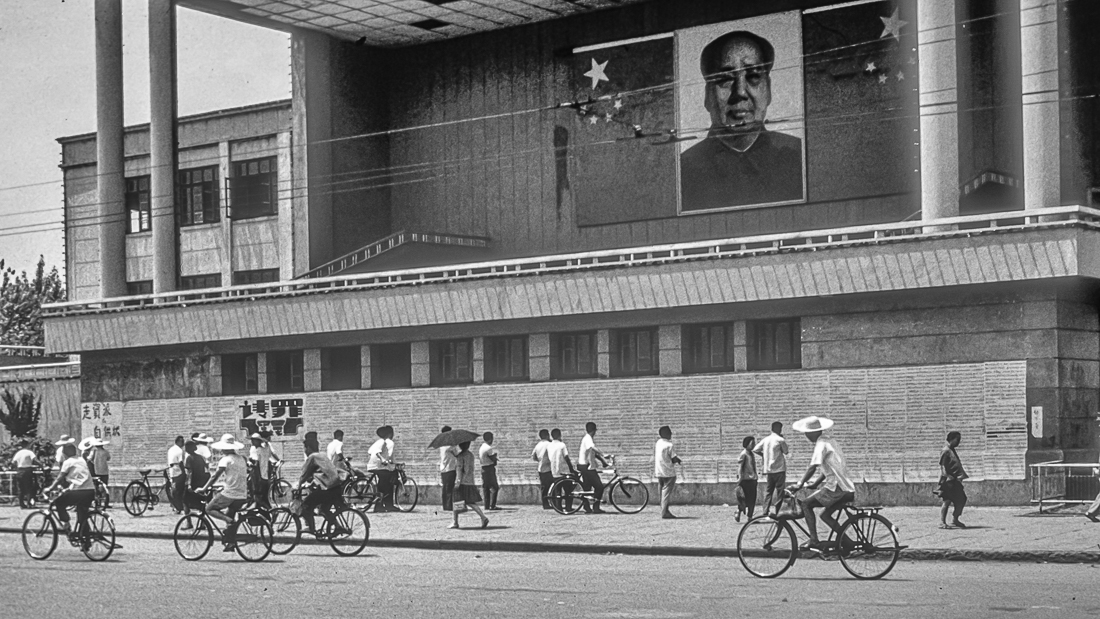
Cyclists bike past a portrait of Mao Zedong in Beijing, 1976

During the Maoist era, rickshaws fell out of use, and pedicab use became mainly restricted to freight. Cycling emerged as the main form of private transportation, and bicycle production would continue to rise for several decades after the war. China produced around 80,000 bicycles a year in 1952; this increased tenfold by 1957, and tenfold again to 8,540,000 in 1978. Cycling fit the urban development goals of the communist government, which emphasized short commutes and widely available public transportation, but lacked the funding to build mass transit systems. Beijing began including bike lanes alongside its major roads in 1965, separated from the motor lanes by median strips.

In 1958, the Ministry of Light Industry standardized bicycle design, with uniform component designs and dimensions. This standardization helped spread bicycle production outside of the major cities. They were produced in three standard sizes — 24, 26, and 28 inch. Minor issues in their construction or durability were common, but they were relatively simple to repair; although many cyclists made repairs themselves, bicycle repair shops were common and inexpensive.

Although large numbers of bicycle brands existed, Feige, Yongjiu, Wuyang, and Fenghuang emerged as the most prominent and prestigious. Bicycles were accessible to consumers, but relatively difficult to obtain; a Feige-brand bicycle cost 2 months' wages on an average worker's salary, and the wait-lists for ration tickets could stretch for multiple years. Despite this, they proliferated massively in cities, encouraged by subsidies for cyclist commuters and the designation of bike lanes on major roads. In 1978, there were 102.3 bicycles for every 100 households in urban areas. Rates were much lower in rural countryside and varied greatly depending on region, averaging around 30.7 bicycles per 100 households. Bicycle manufactures began producing heavy-duty bikes suitable in rural areas, which were nicknamed "little donkeys" by farmers.

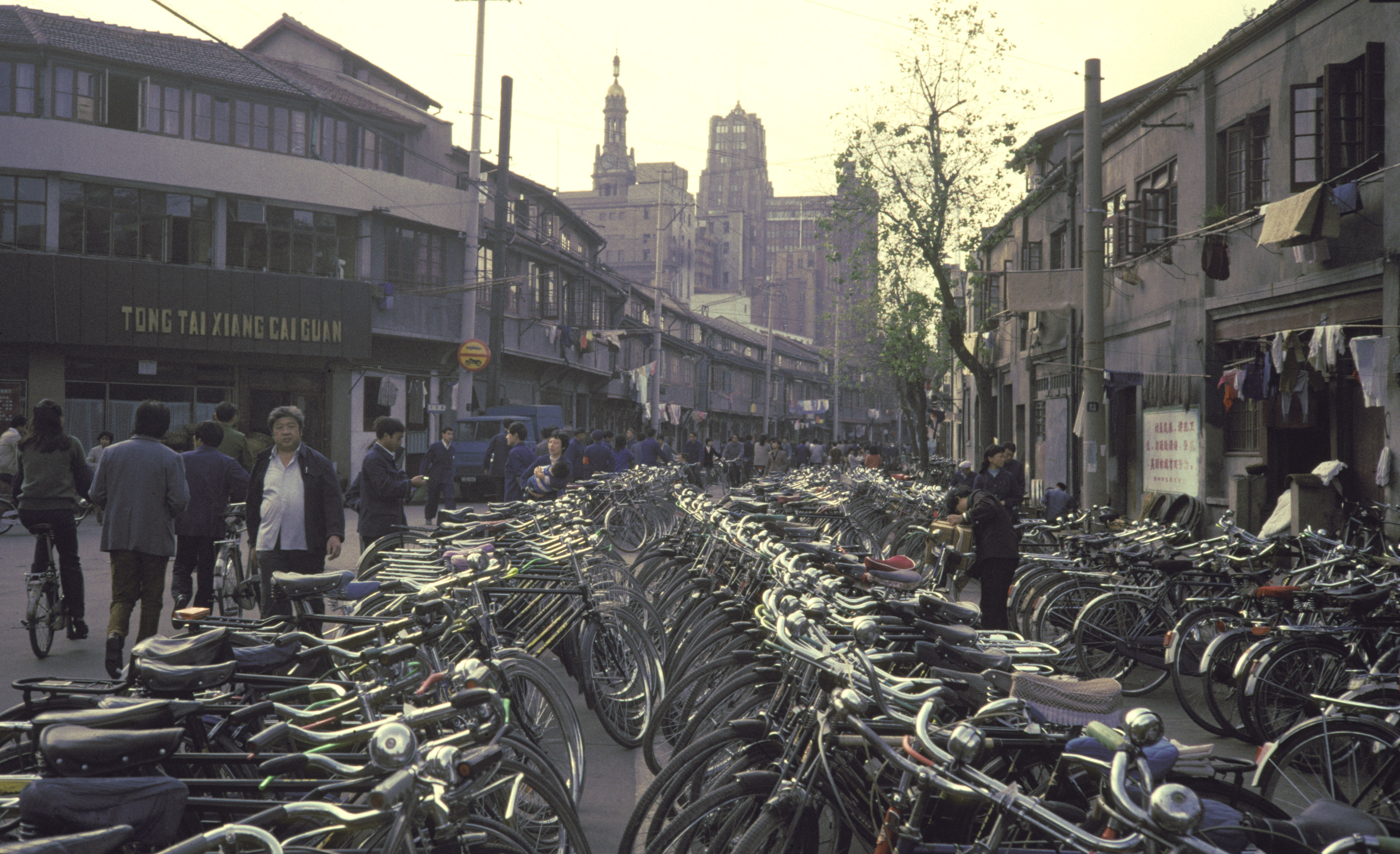
Bicycles in Shanghai in 1982

In reference to the proliferation of cycling, China was nicknamed the "Kingdom of Bicycles" (自行车王国; Zìxíngchē wángguó), while bicycles were considered one of the "three turns" (三转; Sānzhuǎn) desired by Chinese households, alongside wristwatches and sewing machines. The work unit system was heavily incorporated into urban planning during the period, with many work units situated near housing, clinics, day cares, schools, and recreational spaces. This led to workers traveling relatively short distances on a day-to-day basis, incentivizing bicycle use.

Bicycle ownership continued to increase following the transition to a free-market economy in the late 1970s and 1980s, and production reached 41,401,000 per year in 1988. Rationing of bikes was lifted and prices fell dramatically. By 1990, ownership rates increased to 118.3 per 100 households in rural areas and 188.6 per 100 household in cities. They were used by many more commuters than buses, which were generally overcrowded; alternatives such as taxis and motorcycles were prohibitively expensive to most workers. In 1986, 63% of Beijing residents commuted to work by bike.

=== Decline ===
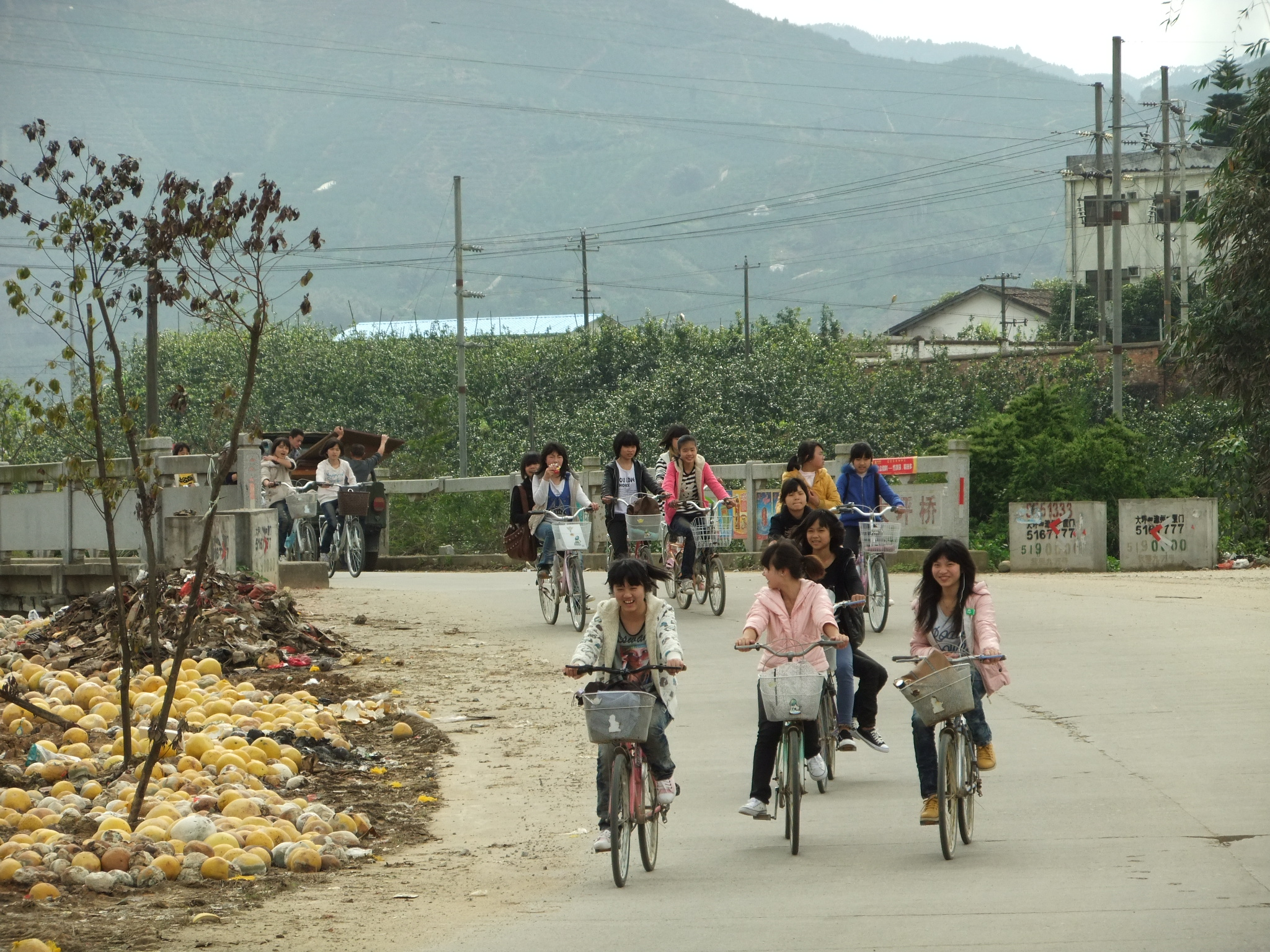
Schoolchildren biking in Pinghe County, Fujian, 2012

China entered a second round of economic reforms in the 1990s, with the promotion of automobiles among the chief industrial priorities. Cycling declined in favor of public transportation, motorcycles, and private cars. Losing its previous prestige, it became increasingly associated with older generations and the Mao era. Private vehicle ownership became a prestigious but accessible option to the middle class by the 2000s, leading to municipal governments prioritizing car infrastructure. Many cities restricted or eliminated their previous bike lanes in order to reduce traffic congestion, with bike use banned entirely on roadways in some city centers. Bicycle lots were converted into parking lots or recreational spaces. Small-scale bicycle repair shops diminished in favor of larger and more expensive specialty shops. Bicycle repair street vendors, formerly common in cities, essentially disappeared.

While 40% of Shanghai workers commuted via bicycle in 2000, only 18.1% did so by 2010. Motorcycles and minibusses emerged as the dominant form of transportation in rural areas in response to expansive highway construction. Despite the general decline of cycling, electric bikes gained popularity over the course of the 1990s and 2000s. Urban redevelopment projects separated many commuters from their workplaces: central business districts and industrial parks emerged, often a great deal away from new housing developments such as urban villages and gated communities. This longer commute time often makes travel by bike impractical. Residential areas in city centers have become increasingly expensive, resulting in many working-class people living in government-subsidized housing on the outskirts of the cities.

== Production ==
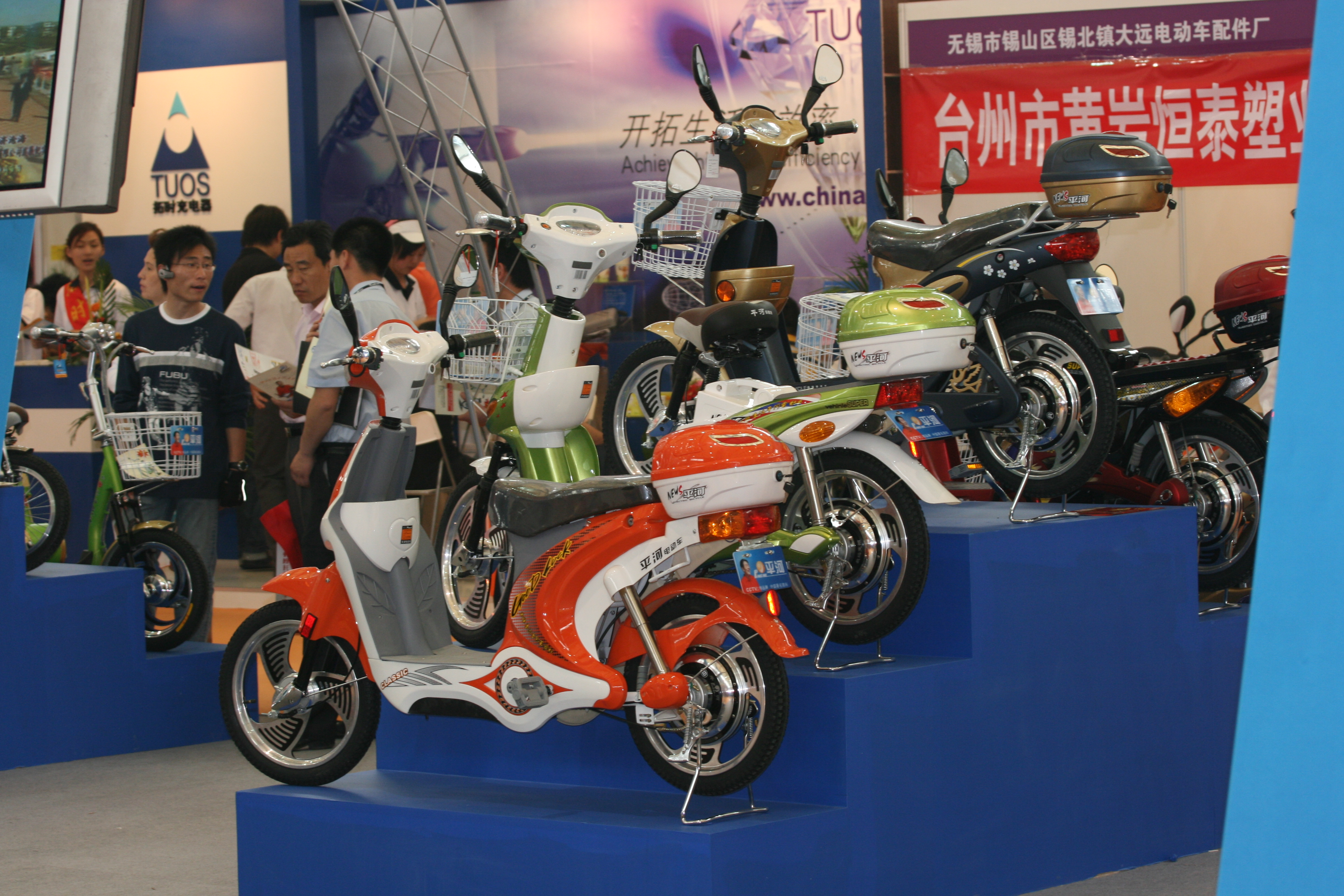
Electric bicycles (e-bikes) at a Chinese trade show, 2007. China is the dominant producer and consumer of e-bikes.

China produces more bicycles than any other country. In 2020, Chinese manufactures produced 29,661,000 electric bicycles (e-bikes) and 44,368,000 traditional (non-electric) bicycles. Production of non-electric bicycles declined over the course of 2010s, corresponding to a less favorable domestic market, while e-bike production has remained relatively steady. Bicycle production has greatly centralized over the reform period; while twenty-four provinces produced traditional bicycles in 1985, only nine did in 2020. Eighteen provinces produce e-bikes, although over 40% of e-bikes are produced in the city of Tianjin, with most of the remainder spread between Jiangsu, Zhejiang, Henan, and Guangdong.

Electric bicycles were first produced in China in 1985, but were not initially popular. They gained popularity in the 1990s, and China has become both the dominant producer and consumer of e-bikes. Around 30,000,000 e-bikes are sold every year in China, around four times the combined sales of the rest of the world. Over 90% of e-bikes sold in China are domestically produced. These generally use lead-acid batteries, although models using lithium-ion batteries have gained popularity since the mid-2010s. In some cities, informal and unauthorized e-bike taxis are prevalent.

== Infrastructure and use ==
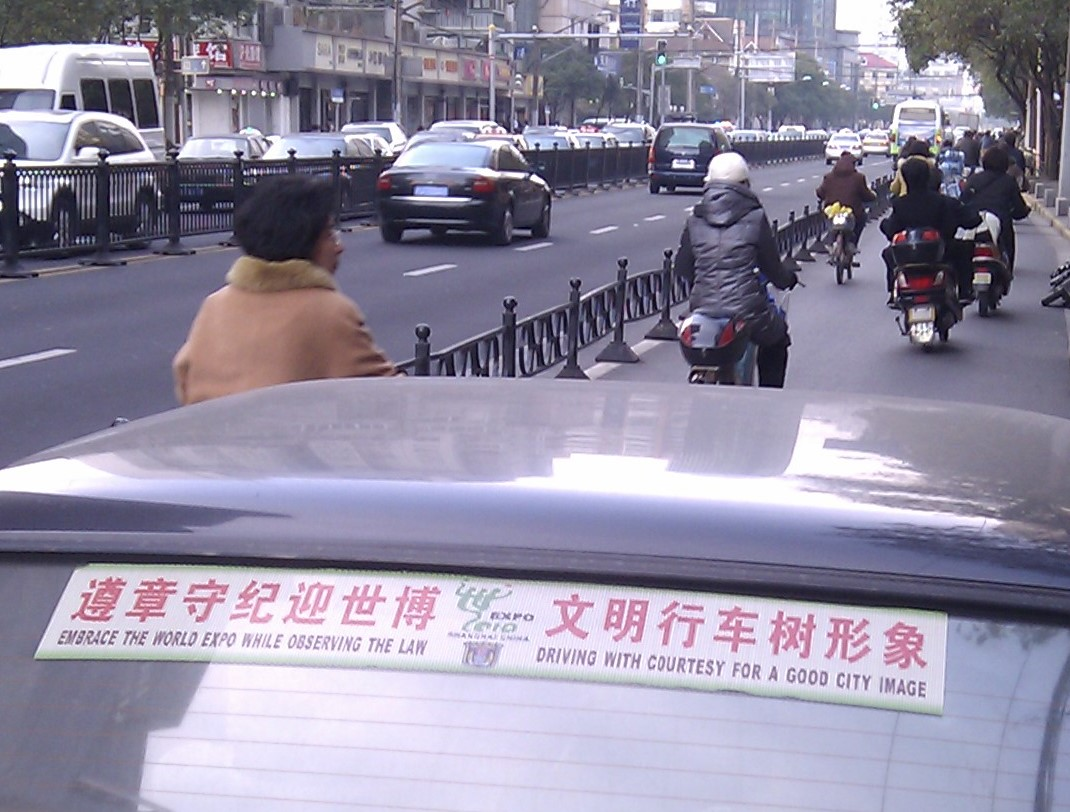
A car parked in a bike lane in Shanghai, 2011

Cycling infrastructure in China is scarce and often low-quality, with automobile transport taking priority in major cities. However, traffic congestion in cities keeps cycling a viable alternative. Newly developed suburbs generally lack bike lanes, and existing bike lanes in cities are often used for parking or converted into extra motor lanes. Although some cities reestablished bike lanes in the 2010s, these are often judged to be poor quality. Bike lanes often fail to connect to one another or go through pedestrian walkways. When running alongside streets, the lanes are often narrow, no more than a meter wide. Cars parking or stopping along curbs often block the lane entirely, forcing cyclists to ride into traffic.

Bike parking spaces are infrequent, with many previously existing spaces converted into parking lots or greenspace. Bus and train stations often lack bike parking spots. Although bikes are allowed to be parked at bus stops, they generally lack parking racks, rain shields, or anti-theft measures. Bicycle theft is common, especially for more expensive vehicles. As of 2007, an estimated 4 million bicycles are stolen in China every year.

Carrier tricycles were common utility vehicles during the early 2010s. In rural environments, they are used to transport tools to the field or produce to markets. In urban areas, they see use as delivery vehicles and as mobile food stands and repair shops. They are also used by city maintenance teams and trash collectors.

=== Bike-sharing systems ===
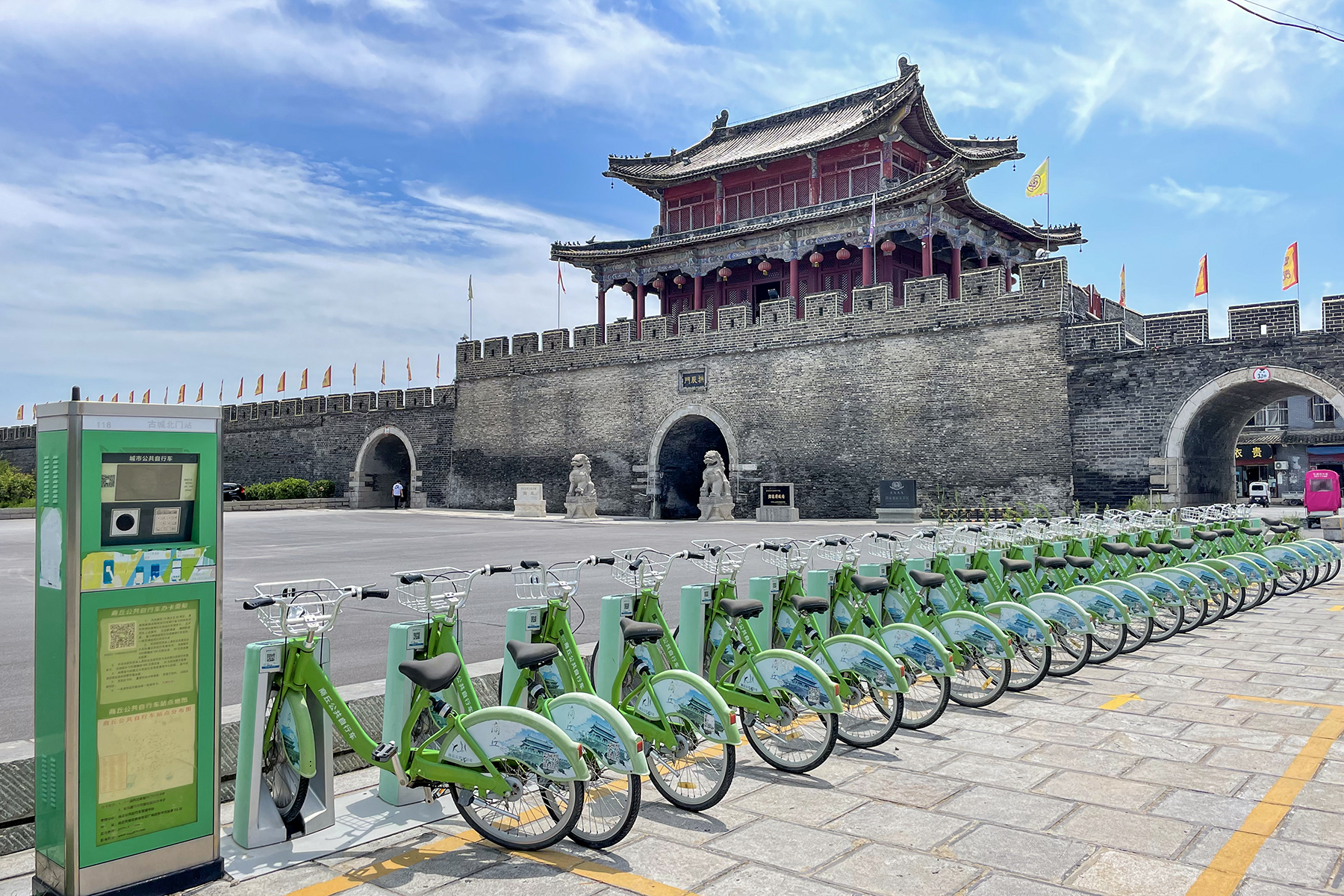
Public bicycles in docking stations at Gongchen Gate in Shangqiu, Henan, 2022

Bicycle-sharing systems have emerged in China as a means to solve the "last kilometer problem" – the gap between commuters' destinations and the nearest available public transit station. Hangzhou Public Bicycle, China's first bike-sharing system, was organized in 2008. Similar systems, both public and private, were created in other cities and counties over the following years. These initially used designated docking systems and payable with coin or credit card. However, these docking systems remained relatively small in scale. Dockless systems using mobile apps and online payment processors were introduced in 2014, leading to rapid expansion of private bike-share systems by private technology companies in favor of prior government-sponsored services. These dockless systems operate using GPS chips embedded in the bike, with users unlocking the bike by scanning QR codes. These bikes collect transit data while in use, advertised by bicycle-sharing companies as a way to ensure that bikes are placed in the most highly-trafficked areas.

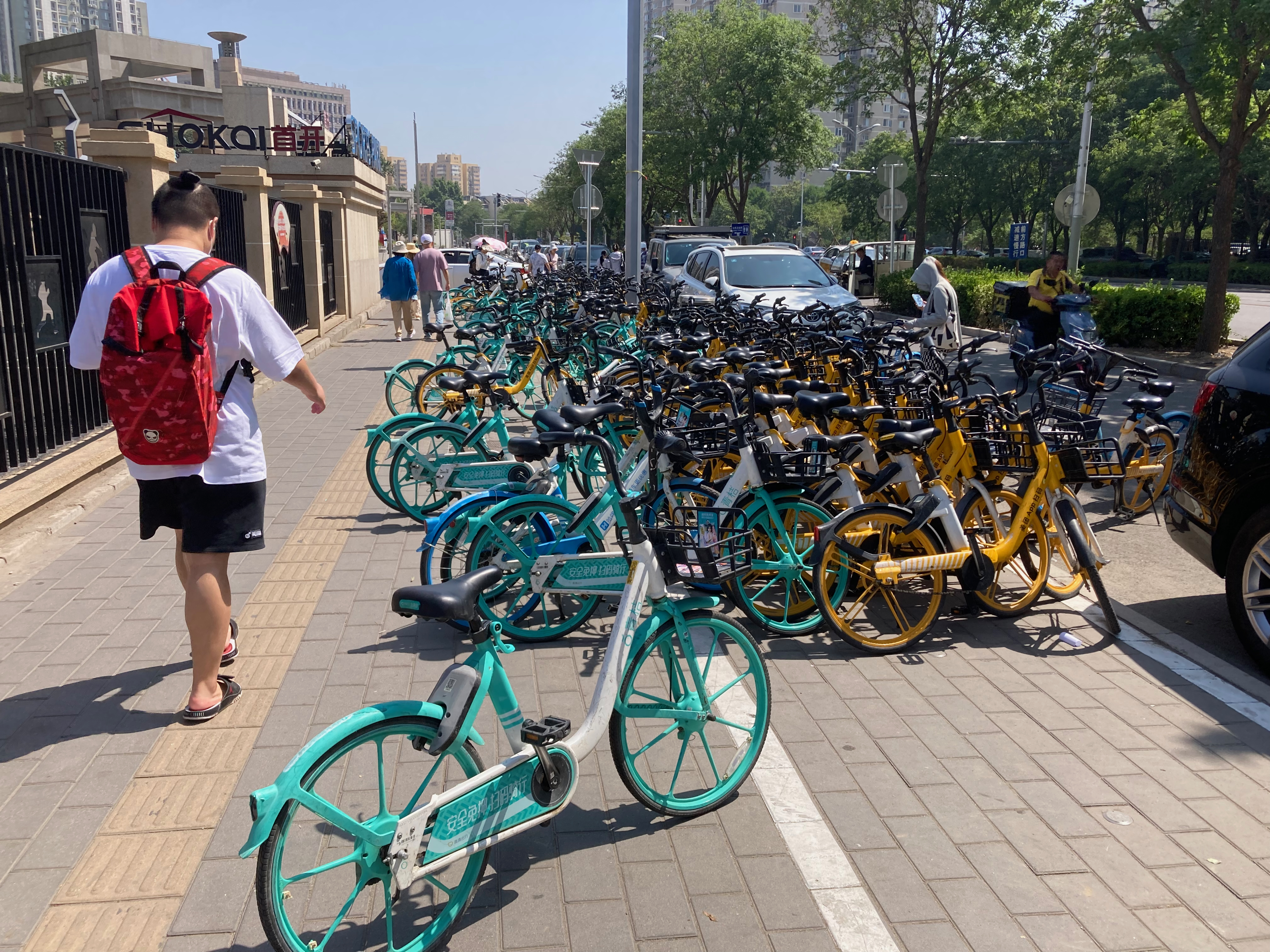
Dockless shared bikes in Beijing, 2023

Unlike many other countries, where bicycle-sharing systems are operated as public–private partnerships, many of China's dockless bicycle systems are privatized, initially with little-to-no involvement by governments and urban planning committees. Despite the dominance of the private apps, many major cities continue to maintain their own government-sponsored bike-sharing systems in parallel, several with fleets measuring in the tens of thousands of vehicles. One of the first private bicycle-sharing companies, Ofo, was founded in Beijing in 2014. This was followed by Mobike in Shanghai, which quickly emerged as Ofo's main competitor. In the mid-2010s, a bike-sharing market bubble resulted in a significant oversupply of bicycles in urban centers. Venture capital funds began to massively invest in bicycle startups, most prominently Ofo and Mobike, although dozens of smaller competitor apps emerged. Ofo and Mobike dominated the market share for bicycles; by early 2019, there was an estimated 23 million public bicycles in China, of which 95% were part of Ofo or Mobike's fleets. In 2018, Beijing alone had 2.4 million bicycles in their bike-share fleets and 11 million registered users of bike-sharing apps — slightly under half the city's population.

Although widespread enthusiasm surrounded the rapid expansion of private bicycle-sharing apps, bicycle infrastructure remained poor. Companies placed bikes in large numbers across city centers, often blocking footpaths and obstructing street cleaning. Instead of collecting and fixing bikes which were worn or vandalized, Ofo and Mobike ensured a steady supply of new bikes, with broken bikes left in the streets. Bankruptcies among many prominent bicycle companies led to great numbers of abandoned and broken bikes accumulating in urban areas, often accumulating into large junk piles dubbed "bicycle cemeteries". Ofo ceased operations, while Mobike was acquired by the online retailer Meituan. After mass clean-up campaigns at the end of the 2010s, local governments established regulations limiting the number of shared bikes and bicycle-sharing companies allowed to operate in each city, and began levying fines for bikes parked outside of designated areas.

In June 2024, some university students in Zhengzhou began riding shared bikes to the city of Kaifeng (about 50 kilometres (30 mi) away) to acquire the local specialty of tangbao (soup-filled bao). This became a trend over the following months, and by November escalated into a night ride of over 100,000 students. This led to severe traffic jams, due to a lack of infrastructure and many bikes being discarded in Kaifeng, leading some Zhengzhou universities to ban the use of bikes.

== Cycle sport ==
Before 1998, professional cycling in China was managed by the Cycling and Motorcycling Management Center of the Sports Ministry. The ministry was reformed into the General Administration of Sport (GAS) in 1998. In the early 2000s, the GAS established National Cycling and Fencing Management Center to manage professional cycling, fencing, triathlon, modern pentathlon, and equestrian sports. Two divisions, the Cycling Department and the National Cycling Team, exist under the center. Due to the shared administration and resources of the five sports under a common body, cycling is less emphasized by the GAS than other Olympic sports. The Cycling Department and national team are both frequently understaffed. The Chinese Bicycle Association estimates that the majority of sport bikers in China are mountain bikers, with a smaller portion being road bikers.

In 2010, the central government organized the Chinese Cycling Association (CCA), a national cycle sport governing body and member of the Union Cycliste Internationale (UCI). Although ostensibly part of the Ministry of Civil Affairs, it is de facto managed by the GAS's Cycling Department. Most provinces and autonomous regions have also established regional cycling teams and management centers, not directly affiliated with the CCA. These teams compete against each other at a variety of domestic competitions, most notably the National Games.

=== International competition ===
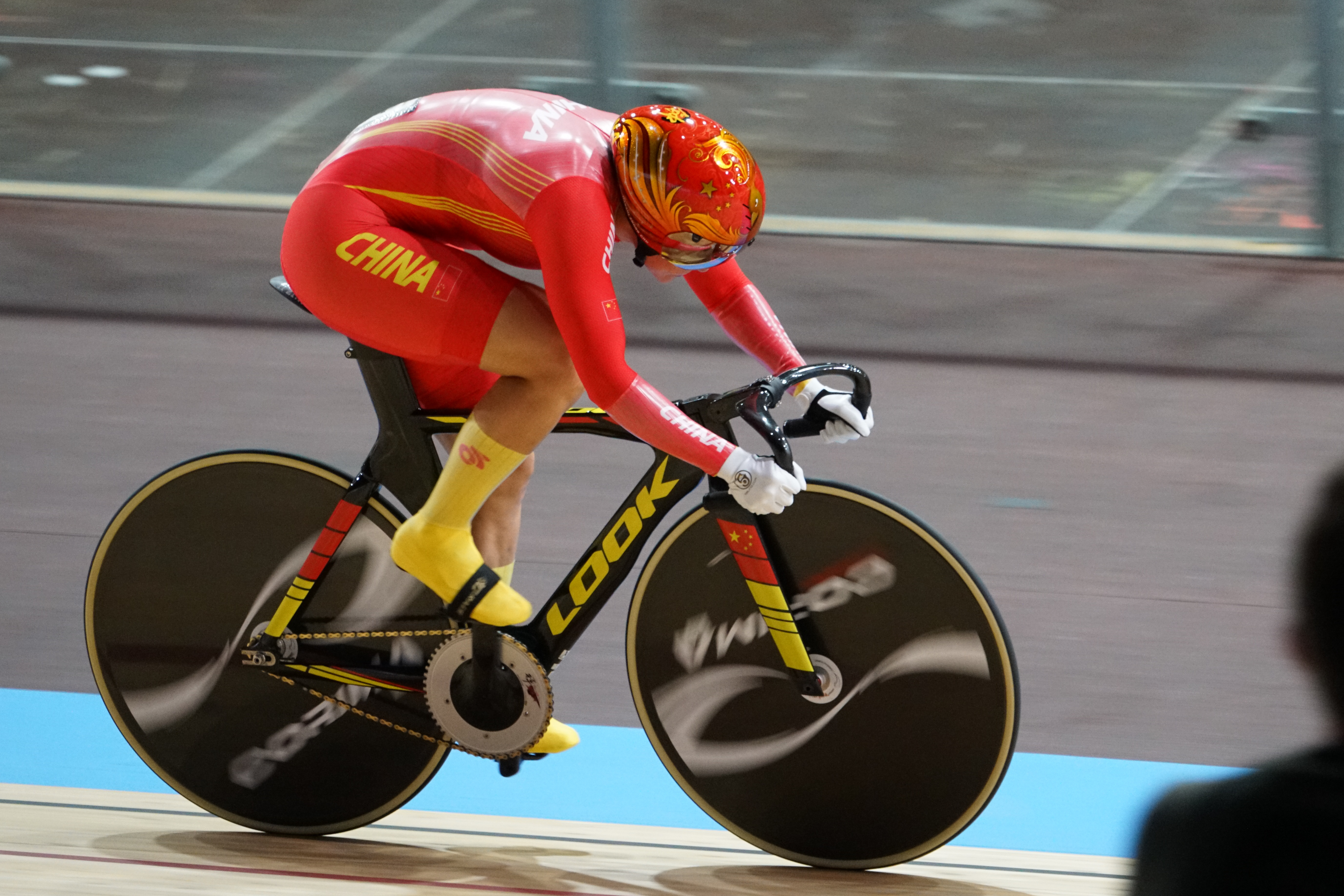
Zhong Tianshi, one of China's first Olympic gold medalists in cycling, at the 2020 UCI Track World Championships

The Netherlands-born track cyclist Howard Wing was recruited to the 1936 Chinese Olympic team, becoming the first athlete to represent China in cycling at an international level. He went on to represent China at eight world championships and the 1948 Summer Olympics. However, he never won a medal. China did not participate again in cycling at the Olympics until the 1984 games. Its first medal in cycling was won by Jiang Cuihua in the women's track time trial at the 2000 games.

Although historically underrepresented in cycle sports, Chinese teams began to see greater success in internal competition in the years following the CCA's founding. Chinese athletes won three medals in cycling at the 2012 Summer Olympics. At the 2016 Summer Olympics, the Chinese women's cycling team won the country's first gold medal in cycling in the women's team sprint. In road bicycle racing, Ji Cheng was the first Chinese cyclist to compete in each of the Three Grand Tour races (the Giro d'Italia, the Vuelta a España, and the Tour de France). He finished in last place in the 2014 Tour de France, his only finish in the race.

==== BMX ====
BMX (bicycle motocross) was introduced to China in the early 2000s, with both amateur and semiprofessional BMX athletes riding in major metropolitan centers such as Beijing, Guangzhou, and Shanghai, before spreading to smaller cities. BMX racing was included within the National Games in 2005 and the 2008 Beijing Olympics, gaining the sport its first widespread publicity in China. Freestyle BMX was more obscure until it was introduced as an Olympic sport in the leadup to the 2020 Summer Olympics. The GAS organized a national freestyle BMX team in January 2018, and established a training center for the sport in Puyang. At the 2024 Summer Olympics, Deng Yawen won China's first Olympic medal in BMX, winning gold in the women's BMX freestyle.
