= Cycling at the 2023 European Games – Women's park =

Women's park at the 2023 European Games
- Venue: Krzeszowice BMX Park
- Dates: 21–22 June
- Competitors: 15 from 9 nations
- Winning points: 82.33

Medalists
gold medal	Iveta Miculyčová	Czech Republic
silver medal	Kim Lea Müller	Germany
bronze medal	Laury Perez	France

The women's BMX freestyle – Park event at the 2023 European Games took place on 21 and 22 June 2023 at the Krzeszowice BMX Park. The event will feature 16 cyclists representing 9 nations.

== Competition format ==
The competition consists of a qualification and a final medal round, within which each competitor does two runs. In the seeding, an average is taken of both runs to place cyclists. In the final, the highest scoring single run win.

== Results ==
=== Qualification ===
The qualification was started on 21 June at 11:30.

Rank	Heat	Start order	Rider	Nation	Run 1	Run 2	Average	Notes
1	2	10	Nikita Ducarroz	Switzerland	78.00	80.00	79.00	Q
2	3	15	Kim Lea Müller	Germany	76.00	78.33	77.16	Q
3	3	13	Laury Perez	France	74.00	74.50	74.25	Q
4	3	16	Iveta Miculyčová	Czech Republic	71.83	69.33	70.58	Q
5	2	7	Sasha Pardoe	Great Britain	63.00	72.33	67.66	Q
6	2	11	Lara Marie Lessmann	Germany	70.00	44.33	57.16	Q
7	3	14	Teresa Fernández-Miranda	Spain	57.00	53.33	55.16	Q
8	1	4	Kateřina Jalůvková	Czech Republic	47.66	49.00	48.33	Q
9	1	5	Naomi Vojtechovská	Slovakia	43.00	45.33	44.16	Q
10	2	8	Wiktoria Maciuk	Poland	39.00	41.66	40.33	Q
11	1	3	Liis Lokk	Estonia	37.00	39.50	38.25	Q
12	1	2	Holly Pipe	Great Britain	33.66	39.66	36.66	Q
13	2	9	Lucia Čajková	Slovakia	34.66	17.33	25.99	
14	1	1	Natalia Niedźwiedź	Poland	30.00	11.00	20.50	
15	1	6	Lillyana Seidler	Germany	27.33	6.00	16.66	
	3	12	Charlotte Worthington	Great Britain	Did not start			

=== Final ===
The final was started on 22 June at 15:00.

Rank	Heat	Start order	Rider	Nation	Run 1	Run 2	Best
1st place, gold medalist(s)	2	9	Iveta Miculyčová	Czech Republic	76.33	82.33	82.33
2nd place, silver medalist(s)	2	11	Kim Lea Müller	Germany	54.33	79.66	79.66
3rd place, bronze medalist(s)	2	10	Laury Perez	France	69.33	77.00	77.00
4	2	12	Nikita Ducarroz	Switzerland	49.00	74.00	74.00
5	2	7	Lara Marie Lessmann	Germany	68.00	55.33	68.00
6	1	6	Teresa Fernández-Miranda	Spain	52.00	64.00	64.00
7	1	5	Kateřina Jalůvková	Czech Republic	56.66	15.66	55.66
8	1	1	Holly Pipe	Great Britain	42.00	55.66	55.66
9	1	4	Naomi Vojtechovská	Slovakia	44.66	9.33	44.66
10	1	3	Wiktoria Maciuk	Poland	36.33	33.33	36.33
11	1	2	Liis Lokk	Estonia	30.66	28.66	30.66
	2	8	Sasha Pardoe	Great Britain	Did not start		
