= Night ride to Kaifeng =

2024 trend in Henan, China

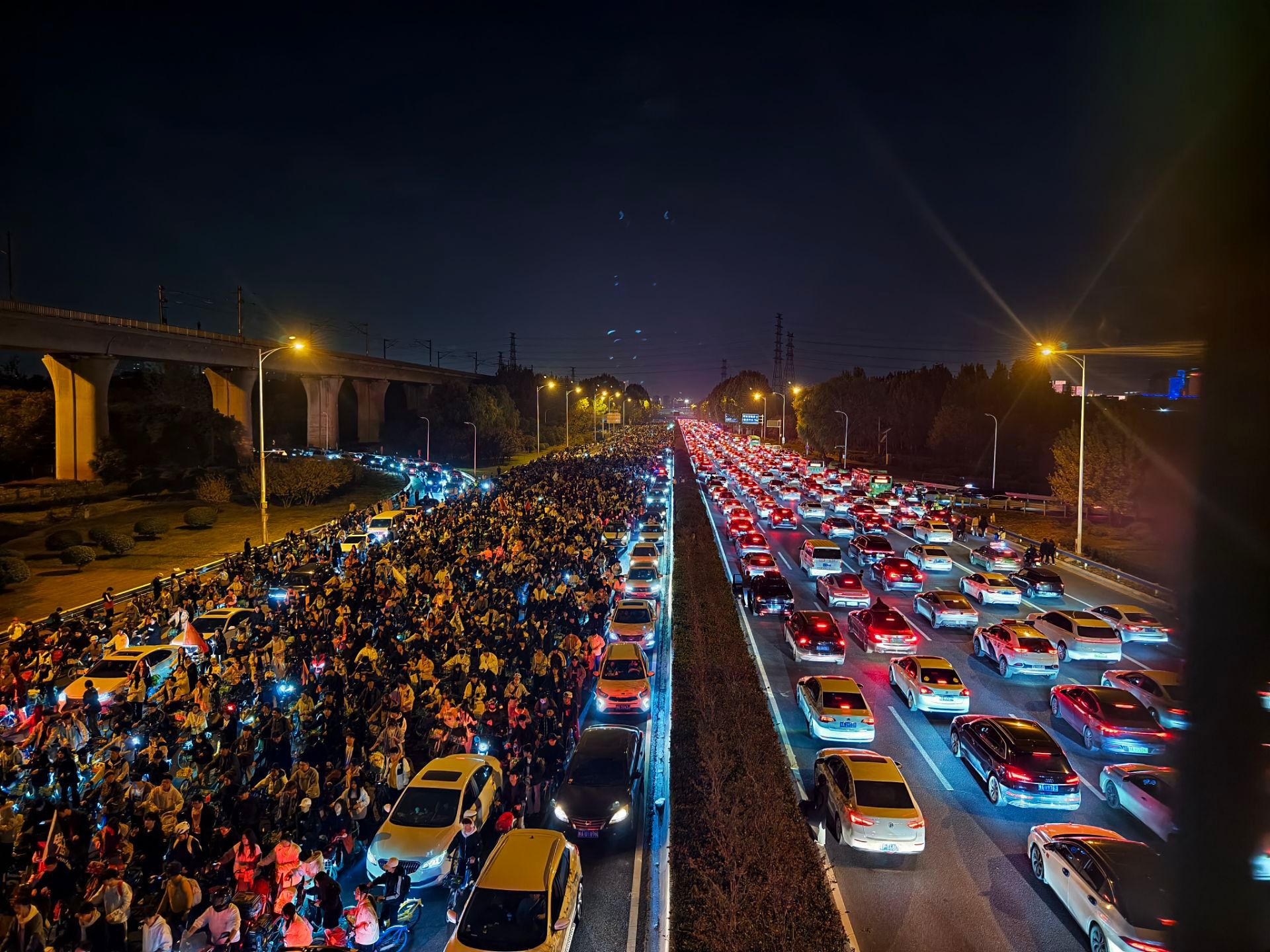
Hundreds of bikers traveling to Kaifeng on November 9

The night ride to Kaifeng was a viral trend in which university students rode shared bikes from Zhengzhou to Kaifeng in Henan province, China. The trend started on June 18, 2024, and peaked with an estimated 100,000–200,000 participants on November 8, 2024. Authorities halted the trend from November 9, 2024.

== Background ==
Zhengzhou is the provincial capital of Henan and a major center of higher education, with 1.75 million university students in 2023. Kaifeng has been the capital of several dynasties, including the Northern Song dynasty, and lies to the east of Zhengzhou. A 39-kilometre (24 mi) expressway, Zhengkai Avenue, runs between the cities.

In China, over 100 million people, primarily young adults, cycle regularly. Shared bikes are widespread, with subscriptions available for as little as $1.95 a month. Although the bicycles are usually ridden within a city or town, bike-share services allow them to be dropped off anywhere, with a dispatch fee charged for longer distances.

In the 2020s, budget travel gained popularity in response to economic uncertainty related to the property sector crisis. In particular, "special forces tourism" emerged as a style of travel to spend little and visit many attractions in a short time, becoming popular among young people. Some smaller cities, such as Zibo and Tianshui, experienced short-term booms in tourism when their local cuisine trended on social media.

China's government has cracked down on large public gatherings because they may lead to protests such as the white paper protests against COVID-19 restrictions. In October 2024, Shanghai police broke up Halloween gatherings and forced some people to remove costumes after Halloween costumes in Shanghai that were critical of government policy went viral the previous year.

== Trend ==
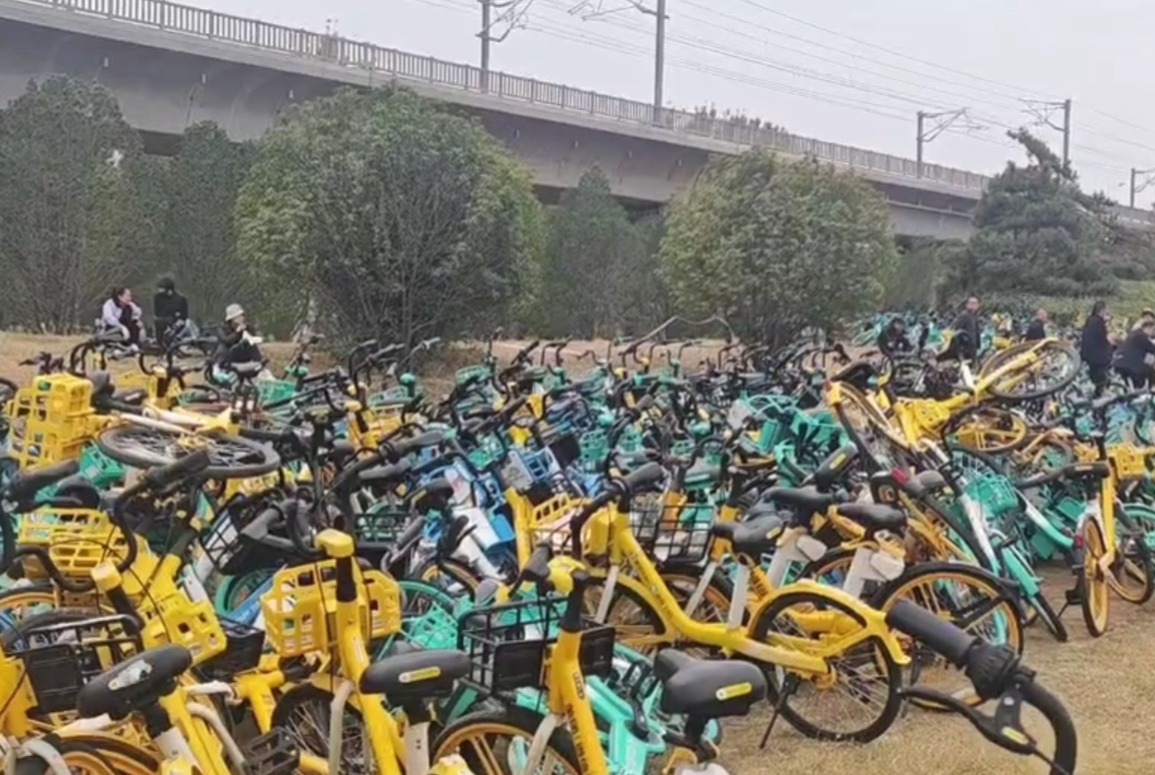
Shared bikes by Zhengkai Avenue on November 9

On the evening of June 18, 2024, four female university students in Zhengzhou made a spontaneous trip to Kaifeng to eat guantangbao, a soup dumpling that the city is known for. They decided to cycle because they could not find a bus and did not want to spend money on train tickets. They posted about the experience on social media, sparking a trend. On weekend nights throughout the following months, small groups of Zhengzhou university students cycled to Kaifeng, with numbers picking up in October as people published guides on social media.

According to Kaifeng's government, over 17,000 students, almost all riding shared bikes, made the trip between November 1 and November 4. Starting November 3, Kaifeng's government made accommodations for increased traffic, adding bicycle parking points and increasing traffic police patrols on Zhengkai Avenue to direct cyclists from the roadway to the bike lane. The city and bike-share companies issued notices asking cyclists to follow traffic laws and bike safely. Kaifeng's government also encouraged tourism by university students, offering them free admission to some tourist attractions, free souvenirs, free Song dynasty makeup and costuming, and free breakfast.

Many cyclists dropped off their shared bikes in Kaifeng and returned to Zhengzhou by train. The bicycles obstructed the streets of Kaifeng and created a bike shortage in Zhengzhou. Bike-share companies dispatched additional drivers to transport the bicycles back to Zhengzhou.

The trend's slogan on social media was "youth is priceless". Many participants carried Chinese flags and sang the Chinese national anthem. On social media and in news interviews, participants said they enjoyed the excitement and social interaction of the ride, and some said it was an escape from job-search anxiety. Many cyclists were inexperienced and poorly equipped; some became exhausted. As the trend became more popular, non-students also participated, and some people came from other cities to join. A few people rode motorbikes or walked, and others crowd-watched from camping chairs or cars. There were also people giving out water and people setting off fireworks. Cycling at night became more popular in other major Chinese cities as well, but to a lesser extent.

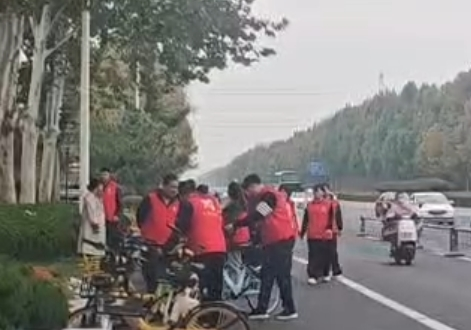
Volunteers tidying shared bikes on Zhengkai Avenue on November 9

The number of participants peaked on the night of Friday, November 8, with estimates ranging from 100,000 to 200,000 students. Cyclists filled the six lanes of Zhengkai Avenue towards Kaifeng, causing serious congestion. A Zhengzhou resident said that it took more than three hours to drive to Kaifeng, when normally the trip took slightly over an hour. At 10 pm, traffic police temporarily banned east-bound motor traffic on the 10 km stretch of road leading to Zhengkai Avenue. On Zhengkai Avenue, traffic police with megaphones asked cyclists to turn back or return by a free bus. Some cyclists slept on the ground in a park after arriving in the early morning. At noon of the next day, some roads in Kaifeng were still impassable due to large amounts of parked bikes.

== Response ==
The initial reaction by state media was positive, with People's Daily praising the students' youthful enthusiasm and contribution to tourism on November 7. On the same day, a university in Fujian said it would discuss disciplining a professor for insulting participating students in a class group chat. On November 9, the Communist Party magazine China Comment was more critical, writing "youth is priceless, but society bears a cost". The Kaifeng Public Safety Bureau cautioned against cycling in large groups or at night due to safety concerns.

Authorities cracked down on the trend starting the afternoon of November 9. Traffic police closed Zhengkai Avenue to east-bound nonmotorized traffic until noon of the next day, saying that the roads needed to be cleared for safety. Three major bike-sharing services, Hellobike, DiDi Bike, and Mobike, issued a joint statement discouraging long-distance travel and announcing that their shared bikes in Zhengzhou would lock remotely and charge a fee if taken out of their operating area. Many universities in Henan and some in adjacent provinces imposed various restrictions on student movement. The most common was temporarily forbidding all students from leaving campus, while others required students to apply for permission to leave or required off-campus students to send their real-time location. Students criticized the restrictions as a return to pandemic lockdowns. According to a notice by one university in Zhengzhou, police and the Henan Provincial Department of Education were concerned because many working adults had joined the ride, suggesting that "antisocial elements" and "foreign adversaries" also participated.

Opinions on social media were divided. Some criticized the students for littering and other irresponsible behavior, while others blamed authorities for promoting the trend without adequately preparing. While students apologized for the mess and some regretted going, others said they were glad to have enjoyed their youth.

== See also ==
- Cycling in China
