= Dylan Hessey =

British bicycle motocross rider

Personal information
- Born: 18 October 2003 (age 22)

Sport
- Sport: Freestyle BMX
Medal record
Men's freestyle BMX
Representing Great Britain
European Championships
Gold medal – first place	2025 Eindhoven	Freestyle Park
Bronze medal – third place	2024 Cadenazzo	Freestyle Park

Dylan Hessey (born 18 October 2003) is a British cyclist who competes in Freestyle BMX. He won the gold medal at the 2025 European Championships.

== Career ==
Hessey is from Widnes, Cheshire, and started riding BMX at the age of seven years-old. From an early age he favoured Freestyle BMX, practising regularly at the Rampworx in Liverpool.

Hessey placed seventh at the 2023 UCI BMX World Cup finals in Bazhong, China, in October 2023.

He won the bronze medal at the 2024 European BMX Championships in Cadenazzo, Switzerland, finishing with a score of 91.33 points to place third behind compatriot Kieran Reilly and Anthony Jeanjean of France.

With a score of 93.35 points, he won the gold medal in the Freestyle BMX at the 2025 European BMX Championships in Eindhoven, in October 2025. He was subsequently unable to compete the following month at the 2025 UCI Urban Cycling World Championships through injury.
