= 2022 European BMX Championships =

The 2022 European BMX Championships consists of two separate championships: BMX racing and freestyle BMX.

- European BMX racing Championships was held in Dessel, Belgium on 8-10 July.
- European Freestyle BMX Championships was held in Munich, Germany on 11-13 August as part 2022 European Championships

== Medal summary ==
=== Racing ===
Event	Gold	Silver	Bronze
Men	Kye Whyte; Great Britain	Cédric Butti; Switzerland	Eddie Moore; Great Britain
Women	Beth Shriever; Great Britain	Elke Vanhoof; Belgium	Camille Maire; France

=== Freestyle ===
Event	Gold		Silver		Bronze	
Men	Anthony Jeanjean; France	93.60	Kieran Reilly; Great Britain	92.10	Marin Ranteš; Croatia	88.80
Women	Iveta Miculyčová; Czech Republic	80.00	Kim Lea Müller; Germany	78.60	Laury Perez; France	78.20
