= 2025 European BMX Championships =

Racing championships

2025 European Championships
- Venue: Valmiera BMX track and Area 51/Ketelhuisplein
- Location: Valmiera, Latvia and Eindhoven, Netherlands
- Dates: 10 to 13 July and 3 to 5 October

The 2025 European BMX Championships consists of two separate championships: BMX racing and freestyle BMX.

- European BMX Racing Championships was held in Valmiera, Latvia from 10 to 13 July.
- European Freestyle and Flatland BMX Championships were held in Eindhoven, Netherlands from 3 to 5 October.

== Racing Championship overview ==
=== Medal summary : Elite ===
Event	Gold		Silver		Bronze	
Elite
Men's Elite	Mathis Ragot Richard; France	32.084	Arthur Pilard; France	32.092	Sylvain André; France	32.396
Women's Elite	Beth Shriever; Great Britain	35.275	Merel Smulders; Netherlands	36.177	Laura Smulders; Netherlands	36.544

=== Medal summary : Age grade ===
Event	Gold		Silver		Bronze	
Age-grade
Men's U23	Jason Noordam; Netherlands	32.256	Casper Pipers; Netherlands	32.353	Edgars Langmanis; Latvia	32.394
Women's U23	Veronika Stūriška; Latvia	35.682	Michelle Wissing; Netherlands	35.957	Sabina Košarkova; Czech Republic	36.940
Men's Junior	Kristers Apels; Latvia	32.705	Jesper Wahlberg; Sweden	32.868	Mark Luthi; Switzerland	32.937
Women's Junior	Freia Challis; Great Britain	36.905	Elsa Rendall Todd; Great Britain	37.357	Lola De Oliveira; France	37.603
Boy's U16	Elias Hellebooge; Belgium	33.557	Finley Hough; Great Britain	33.913	Ben Luthi; Switzerland	34.101
Girl's U16	Léonie Burgel; France	37.179	Lieke Van Der Aa; Netherlands	37.473	Isa Van Der Valden; Netherlands	37.935
Boy's U15	Jules Kasper; Switzerland	33.522	Maël Calmes; France	34.363	James Clitheroe; Great Britain	34.690
Girl's U15	Esmée Vanderstraeten; Belgium	37.887	Emie Seward; Great Britain	38.436	Luna Arpagaus; Switzerland	38.751

== Freestyle Championship overview ==
=== Medal summary : Elite ===
Event	Gold		Silver		Bronze	
Elite
Men's flatland	Sietse van Berkel; Netherlands	90.33	Alexandre Jumelin; France	84.33	Jorgé Gomez; Spain	82.66
Men's park	Dylan Hessey; Great Britain	95.20	Marin Ranteš; Croatia	93.25	Nikita Fominov; Neutral Athlete	89.60
Women's flatland	Anna Mondics; Hungary	84.00	Veronika Kádár; Hungary	78.66	Dasha Rabanete; Spain	64.33
Women's park	Kim Lea Müller; Germany	89.70	Noémi Molnár; Hungary	88.10	Sasha Pardoe; Great Britain	84.20

== Medal table ==
=== Elite division ===
This table does not include medals from the age-grade racing championships.

* Host nation (Latvia)

Rank	Nation	Gold	Silver	Bronze	Total
1	Great Britain	2	0	1	3
2	France	1	2	1	4
3	Hungary	1	2	0	3
4	Netherlands	1	1	1	3
5	Germany	1	0	0	1
6	Croatia	0	1	0	1
7	Spain	0	0	2	2
–	Individual Neutral Athletes	0	0	1	1
Totals (7 entries)		6	6	6	18

=== Participating nations ===
A total of 21 countries participated in 2025 racing championships

- Belgium
- Czech Republic
- Denmark
- Estonia
- Finland
- France
- Germany
- Great Britain
- Ireland
- Italy
- Latvia
- Lithuania
- Netherlands
- Norway
- Portugal
- Slovakia
- Slovenia
- Spain
- Sweden
- Switzerland
- Ukraine

A total of 17 countries participated in 2025 freestyle championships

- Croatia
- Czech Republic
- Estonia
- France
- Germany
- Great Britain
- Hungary
- Individual Neutral Athletes
- Italy
- Latvia
- Netherlands
- Poland
- Slovakia
- Slovenia
- Spain
- Switzerland
- Ukraine
