= Minato Oike =

Japanese BMX freestyle cyclist

Personal information
- Nationality: Japanese
- Born: December 2, 1996 (age 29) Shimada, Shizuoka, Japan

Sport
- Country: Japan
- Sport: BMX freestyle

Minato Oike (大池水杜, Ōike Minato, born 2 December 1996) is a Japanese BMX freestyle cyclist.

Oike competed at the 2020 Olympic Games where she came 7th in the women's BMX freestyle event.

== Competitive history ==
All results are sourced from the Union Cycliste Internationale.

As of August 6, 2024

=== Olympic Games ===
Event	Freestyle Park
(Japan) 2020 Tokyo	7th

=== UCI Cycling World Championships ===
Event	Freestyle Park
(China) 2017 Chengdu	4th
(China) 2018 Chengdu	10th
(China) 2019 Chengdu	10th
(France) 2021 Montpellier	—
(United Arab Emirates) 2022 Abu Dhabi	8th

=== UCI BMX Freestyle World Cup ===
Season	1	2	3	4	Rank	Points
2022	MON; 14	BRU —	GOL; 13		16	660
2023	DIR; 7	MON —	BRU —	BAZ —	21	620
2024	ENO; 9	MON; 4	SHA		2	1290
