= Elizaveta Posadskikh =

Russian BMX freestyle cyclist

Personal information
- Nationality: Russian
- Born: 10 March 1994 (age 32)

Sport
- Country: Russia
- Sport: BMX freestyle

Elizaveta Posadskikh (born 10 March 1994) is a Russian BMX freestyle cyclist.

Posadskikh competed at the 2020 Olympic Games where she placed 9th in the women's BMX freestyle event.

== Competitive history ==
All results are sourced from the Union Cycliste Internationale.

As of August 6th, 2024

=== Olympic Games ===
Event	Freestyle Park
(Japan) 2020 Tokyo	9th

=== UCI Cycling World Championships ===
Event	Freestyle Park
(China) 2017 Chengdu	9th
(China) 2018 Chengdu	8th
(China) 2019 Chengdu	19th
(France) 2021 Montpellier	9th
