= Cycling at the 2023 Pan American Games – Women's BMX freestyle =

Women's BMX Freestyle at the 2023 Pan American Games
- Venue: BMX Track
- Date: 5 November 2023
- Competitors: 8 from 8 nations
- Winning score: 81.67

Medalists
Gold medal	Hannah Roberts	United States
Silver medal	Macarena Perez Grasset	Chile
Bronze medal	Katherine Díaz	Venezuela

The women's BMX freestyle competition of the cycling events at the 2023 Pan American Games was held on 5 November 2023 at the BMX Track in Santiago, Chile.

== Schedule ==
Date	Time	Round
5 November 2023	10:00	Qualification
5 November 2023	12:45	Final

== Results ==
=== Seeding ===
The best four average scores advance to the final.

Rank	Name	Nation	Run 1	Run 2	Score	Notes
1	Hannah Roberts	United States	68.00	63.33	65.67	Q
2	Analía Zacarías	Argentina	62.67	61.00	61.83	Q
3	Katherine Díaz	Venezuela	60.33	57.67	59.00	Q
4	Macarena Perez Grasset	Chile	65.33	24.67	45.00	Q
5	Sofia Baez	Mexico	39.33	36.33	37.83	
6	María Victoria Rocha	Peru	27.00	27.00	27.00	
7	Patricia Marín	Paraguay	24.00	25.00	24.50	
8	Eduarda Bordignon	Brazil	21.33	25.67	23.50	

=== Final ===
The results were as follows.

Rank	Name	Nation	Run 1	Run 2	Score	Notes
1st place, gold medalist(s)	Hannah Roberts	United States	81.67	00.00	81.67	
2nd place, silver medalist(s)	Macarena Perez Grasset	Chile	72.33	72.00	72.33	
3rd place, bronze medalist(s)	Katherine Díaz	Venezuela	65.67	69.00	69.00	
4	Analía Zacarías	Argentina	62.00	59.00	62.00	
