= Cycling at the 2020 Summer Olympics – Women's BMX freestyle =

Olympic cycling event

Women's BMX freestyle at the Games of the XXXII Olympiad
- Olympic BMX cycling
- Venue: Ariake Urban Sports Park
- Date: 31 July – 1 August 2021
- Competitors: 9 from 8 nations

Medalists
1st place, gold medalist(s)		Charlotte Worthington	Great Britain
2nd place, silver medalist(s)		Hannah Roberts	United States
3rd place, bronze medalist(s)		Nikita Ducarroz	Switzerland

The women's BMX freestyle event at the 2020 Summer Olympics took place on 31 July and 1 August 2021 at the Ariake Urban Sports Park. 9 cyclists from 8 nations competed.

== Background ==
This was the debut appearance of the event, with freestyle BMX added to the programme for the first time (BMX racing was added in 2008).

The reigning (2021) World Champion is teenager Hannah Roberts of the United States, who was also the 2017 and 2019 winner and 2018 bronze medalist.

A preview by Olympics.com noted Roberts as favourite, with Macarena Perez of Chile and Charlotte Worthington of Great Britain (the 2021 World Championships bronze medalist) as other contenders.

== Qualification ==
A National Olympic Committee (NOC) could enter up to 2 qualified cyclists in the BMX freestyle. Quota places are allocated to the NOC, which selects the cyclists. There were 9 quota places available, allocated as follows:

- UCI nation ranking (6 places): Top NOC earns 2 places. NOCs ranked 2nd to 5th each earn 1 place.
- 2019 World Championships (2 places): The top 2 NOCs at the 2019 UCI Urban Cycling World Championships, which have not yet earned any quota places, each earn 1 place.
- Host place (1 place): Host nation Japan was guaranteed 1 place.

== Competition format ==
The competition is a two-round tournament, with a seeding round and a final. Each round has the cyclists all do two runs. The runs are 60 seconds long. Five judges give scores between 0.00 and 99.99 based on the difficulty and execution of the rider's run; the scores are averaged for a total run score. In the seeding round, the rider's two run scores are averaged to give a total seeding score. These seeding scores are used to determine the start order of the cyclists in the final, providing a knowledge advantage to the later riders. In the final, only the better score of the two runs counts.

== Schedule ==
The event took place over two consecutive days.

H	Heats	QF	Quarter-Finals	SF	Semi-Finals	F	Finals

BMX, mountain biking and road cycling
Event↓/Date →	24 July	25 July	26 July	27 July	28 July	29 July	30 July	31 Jul	1 Aug
BMX Freestyle
Women's freestyle								H	F

== Results ==
=== Seeding ===
The seeding phase determines the start order for the final. The best ranked rider from the seeding will start last in the final.

Rank	Cyclist	Nation	Run 1	Run 2	Average	Notes
1	Hannah Roberts	United States	89.80	85.60	87.70	
2	Perris Benegas	United States	84.80	88.20	86.50	
3	Nikita Ducarroz	Switzerland	83.70	83.40	83.55	
4	Charlotte Worthington	Great Britain	81.80	81.20	81.50	
5	Natalya Diehm	Australia	77.40	79.00	78.20	
6	Lara Marie Lessmann	Germany	66.00	73.40	69.70	
7	Macarena Perez Grasset	Chile	70.20	65.60	67.90	
8	Minato Oike	Japan	60.00	62.90	61.45	
9	Elizaveta Posadskikh	ROC	51.80	50.80	51.30	

=== Final ===
Rank	Cyclist	Nation	Run 1	Run 2	Best Run	Notes
1st place, gold medalist(s)	Charlotte Worthington	Great Britain	38.60	97.50	97.50	
2nd place, silver medalist(s)	Hannah Roberts	United States	96.10	28.40	96.10	
3rd place, bronze medalist(s)	Nikita Ducarroz	Switzerland	89.20	54.60	89.20	
4	Perris Benegas	United States	81.20	88.50	88.50	
5	Natalya Diehm	Australia	86.00	80.50	86.00	
6	Lara Marie Lessmann	Germany	79.60	78.00	79.60	
7	Minato Oike	Japan	13.40	75.40	75.40	
8	Macarena Perez Grasset	Chile	24.40	73.80	73.80	
9	Elizaveta Posadskikh	ROC	63.00	10.20	63.00	

== See also ==
- Cycling at the 2020 Summer Olympics – Men's BMX freestyle
- Cycling at the 2020 Summer Olympics – Women's BMX racing
- Skateboarding at the 2020 Summer Olympics – Women's park
- 2021 UCI Urban Cycling World Championships
