= Kim Lea Müller =

German cyclist (born 2002)

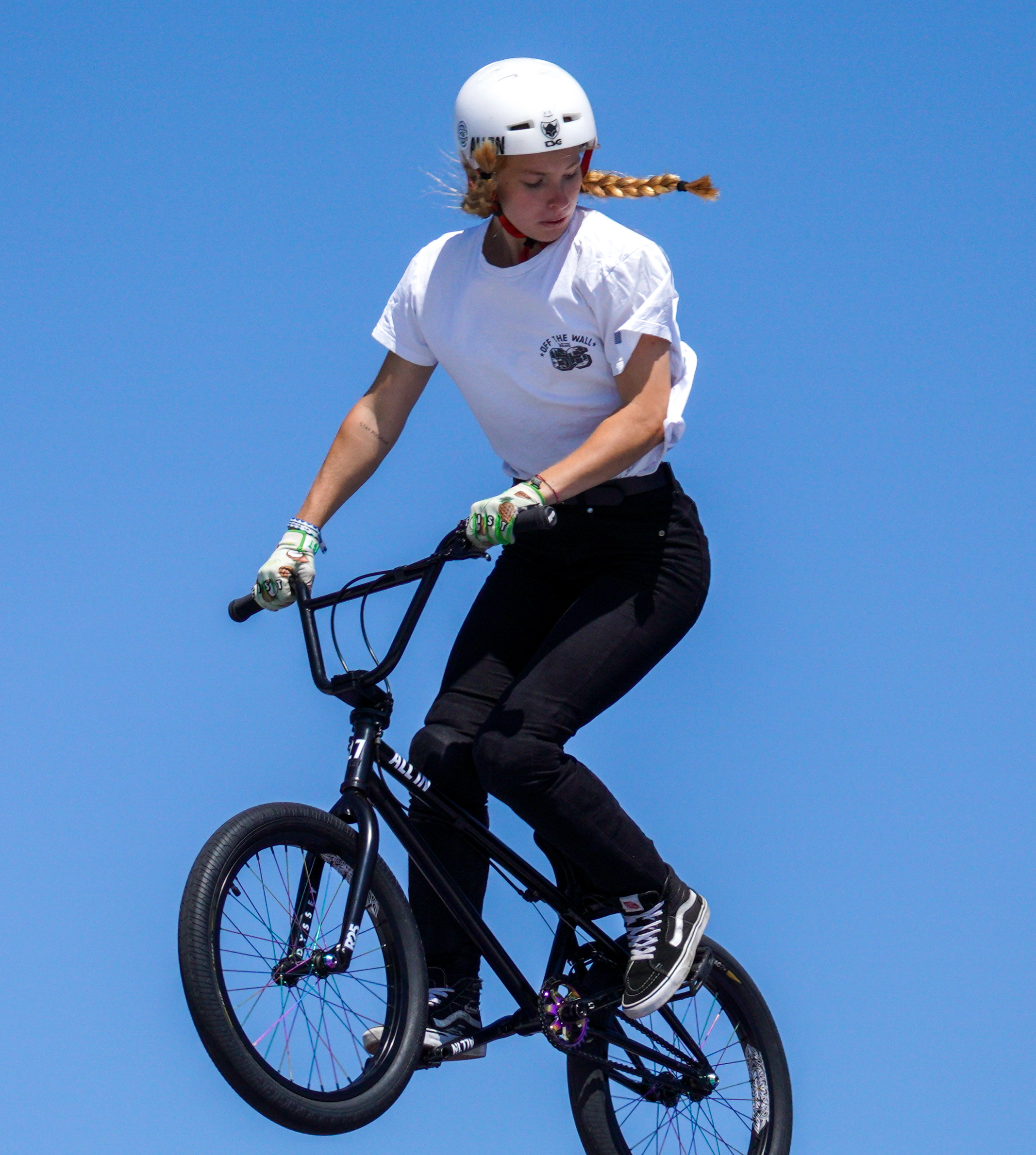
- Müller in 2022

Personal information
- Full name: Kim Lea Müller
- Born: 30 January 2002 (age 24) Remscheid, Germany

Sport
- Country: Germany
- Sport: Freestyle BMX
Medal record
Women's freestyle BMX
Representing Germany
European Games
Silver medal – second place	2023 Kraków-Małopolska	Freestyle Park
European Championships
Gold medal – first place	2025 Eindhoven	Freestyle Park
Silver medal – second place	2022 Munich	Freestyle Park

Kim Lea Müller (born 30 January 2002) is a German cyclist who competes in Freestyle BMX. She won the gold medal at the 2025 European BMX Championships and was a silver medalist at the 2022 European BMX Championships and 2023 European Games.

== Career ==
She won a silver medal at the 2022 European Championships in Munich in August 2022. She competed at the 2022 UCI Urban Cycling World Championships in Abu Dhabi and finished 4th. This performance later allowed her to qualify for the 2024 Summer Olympics.

She won the silver medal at the 2023 European Games in Kraków, Poland.

She won a bronze medal at a bronze medal at X Games Ventura 2024.

Müller competed at the 2024 Summer Olympics in Paris and finished 12th among 12 competitors. After the competition she insisted that she had managed her basic tricks, but hadn't done any crazy tricks. She had to put her foot down in the first run, which cost her a few negative points.

With a score of 89.70 points, she won the gold medal in the Freestyle BMX at the 2025 European BMX Championships in Eindhoven, in October 2025.

== Competitive history ==
All results are sourced from the Union Cycliste Internationale.

As of August 5th, 2024

=== Olympic Games ===
Event	Freestyle Park
(France) 2024 Paris	12th

=== UCI Cycling World Championships ===
Event	Freestyle Park
(France) 2021 Montpellier	17th
(United Arab Emirates) 2022 Abu Dhabi	4th
(United Kingdom) 2023 Glasgow	10th

=== UCI BMX Freestyle Park World Cup ===
Season	1	2	3	4	Rank	Points
2022	MON; 21	BRU; 12	GOL; 5		9	1200
2023	DIR; 12	MON; 10	BRU —	BAZ; 14	12	860
2024	ENO; 17	MON —	SHA		30	200
