= Mathis Ragot Richard =

French BMX cyclist (born 1998)

Personal information
- Born: 3 May 1998 (age 28) Besançon, France

Cycling career
- Sport: Cycling
- Current team: France
- Discipline: BMX racing
- Role: Rider
Medal record
Representing France
Men's BMX racing
World Championships
Bronze medal – third place	2026 Brisbane	BMX racing
European Championships
Gold medal – first place	2025 Valmiera	BMX racing
Gold medal – first place	2026 Sarrians	BMX racing
Silver medal – second place	2024 Verona	BMX racing

Mathis Ragot Richard (born 3 May 1998) is a French cyclist who competes in BMX Racing. He was a gold medalist at the 2025 European BMX Championships.

== Career ==
From Besançon, he started riding as a member of the Besançon BMX club. He won the Junior Men Time Trial title and won silver in the Junior Race at the 2016 UCI BMX World Championships in Colombia. That year, he also won the European junior title.

In January 2024, he joined the Elite Team at Inspyre Bicycles. He won the silver medal behind his compatriot Arthur Pilard at the 2024 European BMX Championships in Verona, Italy. The following year, he upgraded to the gold medal at the 2025 European BMX Championships in Valmiera, Latvia.

== Personal life ==
He has used a YouTube channel Hundred Sixty-one Seconds to which he posts videos of his riding.
