= Laury Perez =

French cyclist (born 2003)

Personal information
- Born: 21 November 2003 (age 22) Beziers, France

Sport
- Country: France
- Sport: Freestyle BMX
Medal record
Women's freestyle BMX
Representing France
European Games
Bronze medal – third place	2023 Kraków-Małopolska	Freestyle Park
European Championships
Bronze medal – third place	2022 Munich	Freestyle Park

Laury Perez (born 21 November 2003) is a French cyclist who competes in Freestyle BMX. She won bronze medals at the 2022 European BMX Championships and 2023 European Games.

== Career ==
She lives in Hérault and is a member of the Sérignan club.

She won bronze medals at the European Championships in 2022. She also won bronze at the 2023 European Games.

In 2024, she won the French championship in BMX freestyle park for the fourth consecutive year.

Perez was selected for the 2024 Summer Olympics in Paris becoming the first French woman to qualify in BMX Freestyle at the Olympics. She competed on 30 July 2024 in the preliminary round and qualified as one of the top nine riders for the final. The next day Perez finished 9th in the final. She fell during the first run and slightly injured her right arm. In the second run Perez made a foot fault.

== Personal life ==
Perez joined the French military in October 2023 as an aviator.

== Competitive history ==
All results are sourced from the Union Cycliste Internationale.

As of August 5th, 2024

=== Olympic Games ===
Event	Freestyle Park
(France) 2024 Paris	9th

=== UCI Cycling World Championships ===
Event	Freestyle Park
(China) 2018 Chengdu	25th
(China) 2019 Chengdu	7th
(France) 2021 Montpellier	DNS
(United Arab Emirates) 2022 Abu Dhabi	12th
(United Kingdom) 2023 Glasgow	18th

=== UCI BMX Freestyle Park World Cup ===
Season	1	2	3	4	Rank	Points
2022	MON; 10	BRU; DNS	GOL; 6		10	1140
2023	DIR; 16	MON; 3	BRU; 12	BAZ; 7	8	1440
2024	ENO; 14	MON; 1	SHA		1	1310
