= Iveta Miculyčová =

Czech cyclist (born 2005)

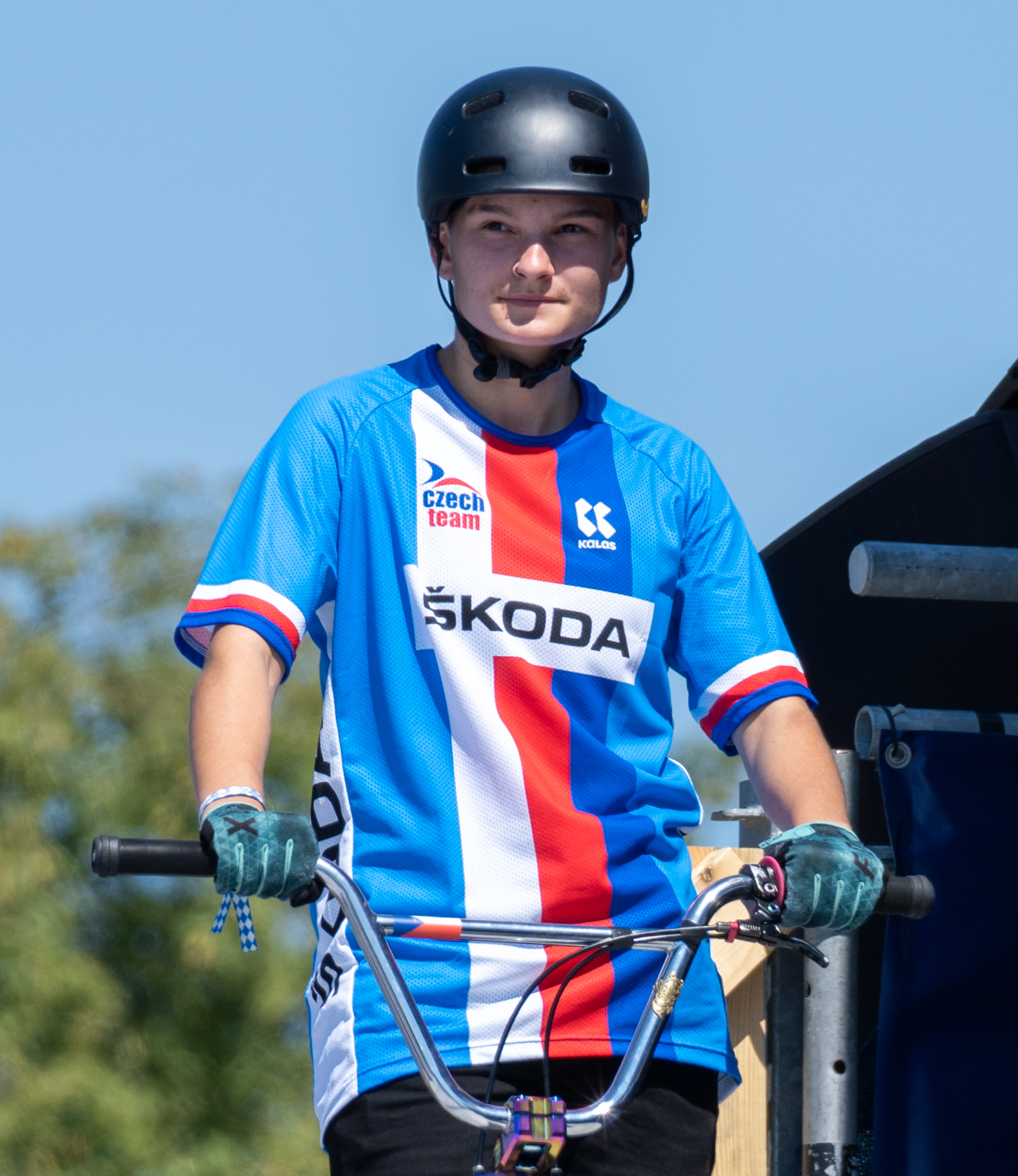
- Miculyčová in 2022

Personal information
- Born: 15 September 2005 (age 21) Kostelec nad Orlicí, Czech Republic

Sport
- Country: Czech Republic
- Sport: Freestyle BMX
Medal record
Women's freestyle BMX
Representing Czech Republic
Urban World Championships
Bronze medal – third place	2022 Abu Dhabi	Freestyle Park
European Games
Gold medal – first place	2023 Kraków-Małopolska	Freestyle Park
European Championships
Gold medal – first place	2022 Munich	Freestyle Park
Gold medal – first place	2023 Krzeszowice	Freestyle Park
Silver medal – second place	2024 Cadenazzo	Freestyle Park

Iveta Miculyčová (born 15 September 2005) is a Czech BMX cyclist. In 2022 she became the European Champion in Freestyle Park and won the bronze medal at the 2022 World Championships.

== Early life ==
Miculyčová is from Kostelec nad Orlicí in the Hradec Králové Region of the Czech Republic. In 2018 a skatepark was built in her hometown and her parents bought her a BMX for Christmas. She also played football and made it to the under-15 national team and received an offer to play from Sparta Prague but her mother preferred her to stay at home and finish her education.

== Career ==
Miculyčová became the first Czech rider to complete a back flip in competition. She won the 2022 European BMX Championships in Munich, Germany, in August 2022, triumphing over a field that included Olympic medalists Charlotte Worthington and Nikita Ducarroz. This win came about despite Miculyčová suffering a hematoma in her thigh which hampered her later runs in the competition. She followed this up with bronze at the 2022 UCI Urban Cycling World Championships held in Abu Dhabi.

=== Olympics 2024 ===
Miculyčová qualified for the 2024 Summer Olympics thanks to her 3rd-place finish at the 2022 UCI Urban Cycling World Championships. She became the first Czech rider, both male or female, to qualify for BMX Freestyle Park event at the Olympics. She finished fifth in the qualification round at the Olympics and qualified for the final. In the first final run Miculyčová posted 82.30 points to place fifth. In the second run she had an early foot-down and eventually finished sixth.

== Competitive history ==
All results are sourced from the Union Cycliste Internationale.

As of August 5th, 2024

=== Olympic Games ===
Event	Freestyle Park
(France) 2024 Paris	6th

=== UCI Cycling World Championships ===
Event	Freestyle Park
(United Arab Emirates) 2022 Abu Dhabi	Bronze
(United Kingdom) 2023 Glasgow	9th

=== UCI BMX Freestyle Park World Cup ===
Season	1	2	3	4	Rank	Points
2022	MON; 12	BRU —	GOL; 15		17	660
2023	DIR —	MON —	BRU; 13	BAZ; 5	25	350
