= Perris Benegas =

American bicycle motocross rider (born 1995)

Personal information
- Full name: Perris Benegas
- Born: July 22, 1995 (age 31) Reno, Nevada, U.S.
- Spouse: Mikaela Herres (m. 2025)

Sport
- Country: United States
- Sport: Freestyle BMX, Dirt jumping
Medal record
Women's BMX
Representing United States
Olympic Games
Silver medal – second place	2024 Paris	Freestyle
Urban World Championships
Gold medal – first place	2018 Chengdu	Freestyle Park
- Updated on August 6, 2024

Perris Benegas (/ˈpɛrɪs bəˈnɛɡəs/ PERR-iss bə-NEG-əs; born July 22, 1995) is an American freestyle BMX cyclist. She won a silver medal at the 2024 Summer Olympics.

== Career ==
In 2018, Perris won the gold medal in Freestyle BMX park at the UCI Urban Cycling World Championships in Chengdu, China, with two other American women, Angie Marino and Hannah Roberts, taking second and third. She was named 2020 Bloom BMX Freestyle Rider of the Year.

=== Olympic Games ===
Benegas competed for the United States at the 2020 Summer Olympics in the first ever BMX Freetyle Park event. She came second in the seeding round behind teammate Hannah Roberts. The next day Benegas finished forth in the final, just 0.70 away from the bronze medal.

After suffering a anterior cruciate knee ligament injury that required surgery in June 2023, she returned to competition in May 2024. She won a silver medal in Women's BMX freestyle at the 2024 Summer Olympics on July 31, 2024. Benegas provisionally placed forth after the first final run and improved to 90.70 to finish second in the competition behind China's Deng Yawen.

== Competitive history ==
All results are sourced from the Union Cycliste Internationale.

As of August 6, 2024:

=== Olympic Games ===
Event	Freestyle Park
(Japan) 2020 Tokyo	4th
(France) 2024 Paris	Silver

=== UCI Cycling World Championships ===
Event	Freestyle Park
(China) 2018 Chengdu	Gold
(China) 2019 Chengdu	8th
(France) 2021 Montpellier	4th
(United Arab Emirates) 2022 Abu Dhabi	7th

=== UCI BMX Freestyle Park World Cup ===
Season	1	2	3	4	Rank	Points
2022	MON —	BRU; 2	GOL; 4		5	1670
2023	DIR; 2	MON; 4	BRU —	BAZ —	5	1590

== Personal life ==
From Reno, Nevada, she graduated from Edward C. Reed High School and has a background in Muay Thai fighting. She lives with Kiah, her Golden Retriever dog in Raleigh, North Carolina.

Benegas is openly gay, and she married Mikaela Herres on July 19, 2025.
