= Phoenix (bicycle company) =

Chinese bicycle company

Phoenix Bicycles logo

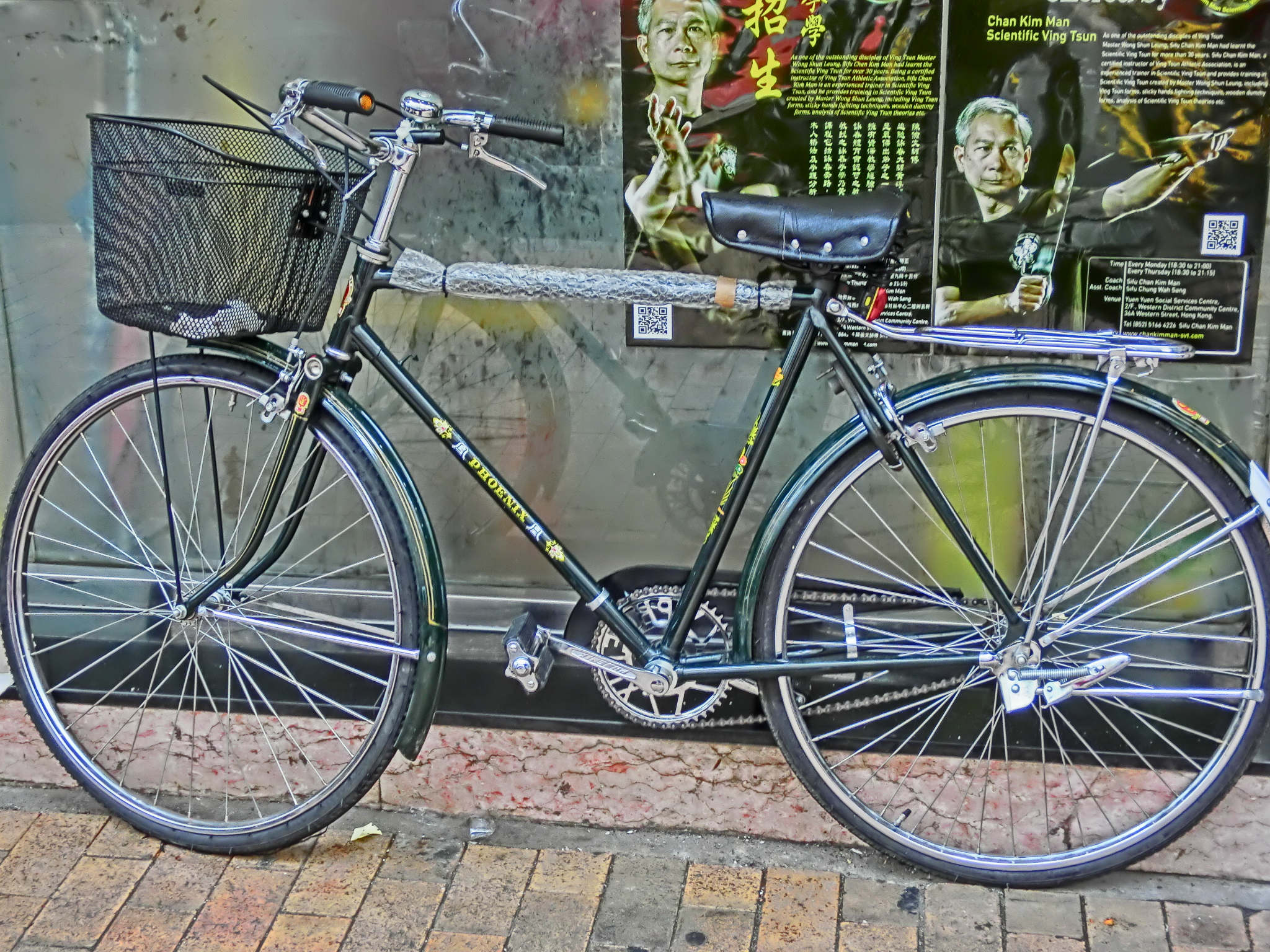
Phoenix branded bicycle

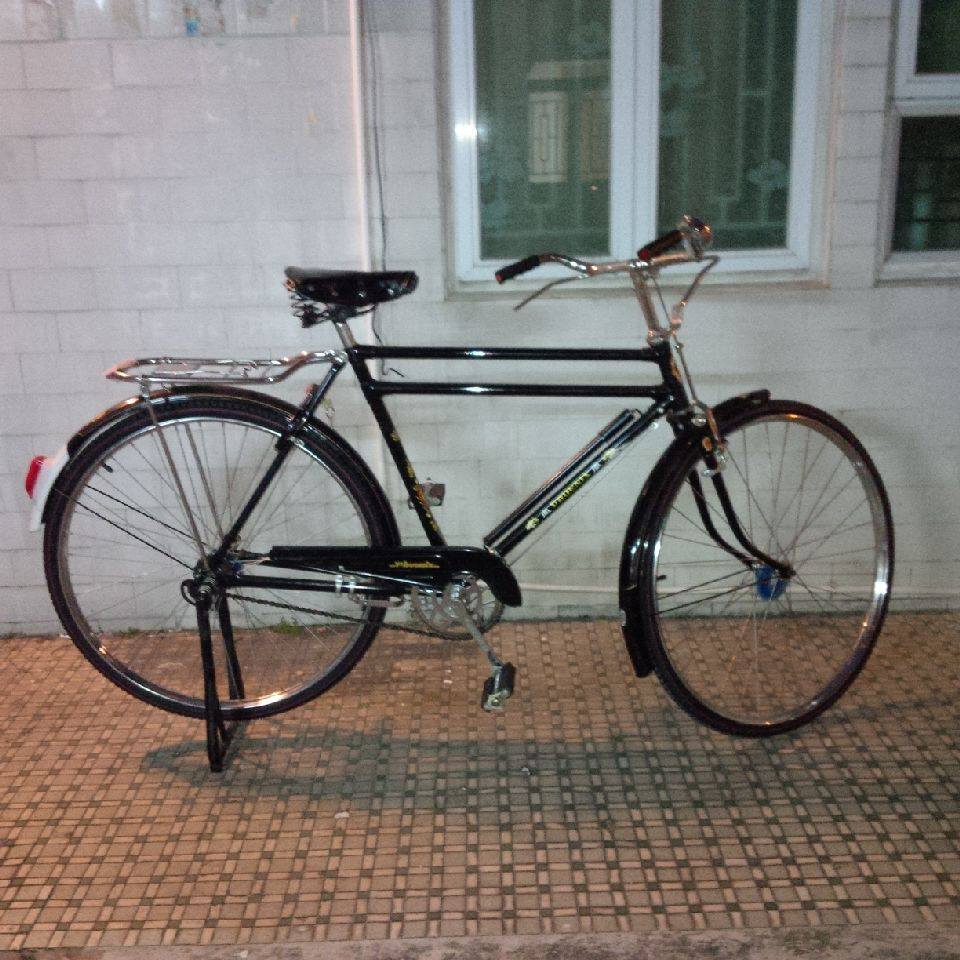
Phoenix SPB15 double tube bicycle in Hong Kong

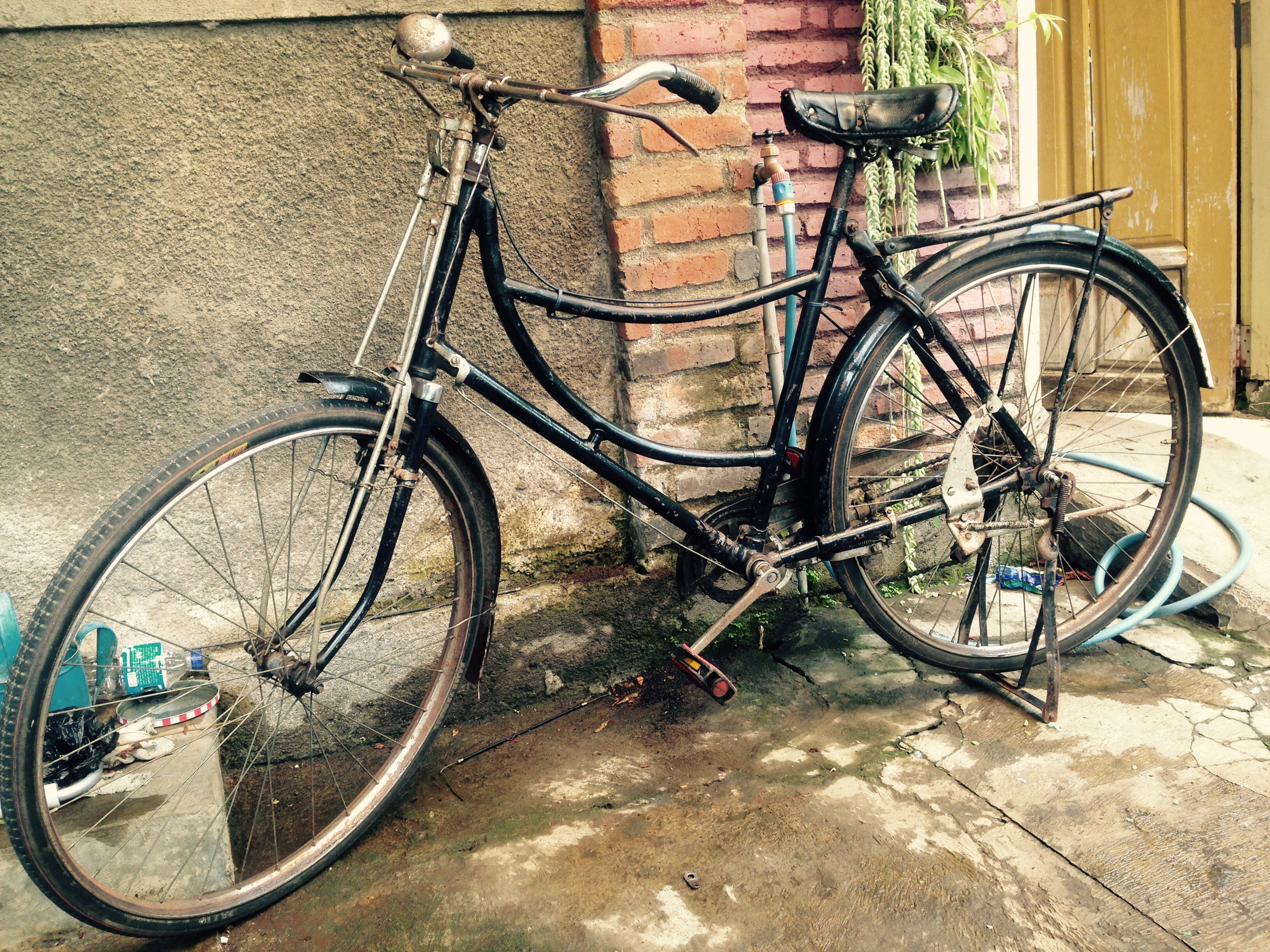
Old 70s Phoenix Bicycle with Other Frame Variant

Shanghai Phoenix Bicycle Co. (Chinese: 上海凤凰自行车有限公司; pinyin: Shànghǎi Fènghuáng Zìxíngchē Yǒuxiàn Gōngsī), better known as Phoenix Bicycles, originated as the Shanghai Third Bicycle Factory created in May, 1958. The establishment of the Third Factory marks the date that the enterprise became joint state-private owned from solely privately owned, then transferred into publicly owned enterprise. Phoenix Company, Ltd is a fully owned subsidiary of Shanghai Phoenix Import & Export Company, Ltd. exclusively selling and distributing rites to Phoenix Brand bicycles and parts. Phoenix exports bicycles to more than 50 countries and earns more than US$60 million annually.

Phoenix bicycle is the Chinese Nation’s special-supported export product. When foreign leaders visited China they were presented with a Phoenix bike as a welcoming gift.

Phoenix Bicycles said in a statement on May 5, 2017, that it is set to produce at least five million bikes for Ofo in the next 12 months.

== Classic products ==
The Classic Phoenix roadster is equipped with a bell, rear rack, single side stand, frame pump and rear reflectors.

- SPL68 - woman's light roadster for women
- SPL65 - man's light roadster for men
- SPL65 - woman's light roadster for women
- SPB05 - man's single top tube bicycle
- SPB10 - man's single top tube bicycle
- SPB15 - man's double tube bicycle

== Other products ==
Phoenix bicycles also produced children's bikes, BMXs, mountain bikes, hybrids, city bikes, leisure bikes, beach cruisers, race bikes, folding bikes, electric bikes, electric scooters, choppers, etc.
