= Sasha Pardoe =

British cyclist (born 2006)

Personal information
- Full name: Sasha Pardoe
- Born: 19 January 2006 (age 20)

Sport
- Country: Great Britain
- Sport: Freestyle BMX
Medal record
Women's freestyle BMX
Representing Great Britain
European Championships
Gold medal – first place	2024 Cadenazzo	Freestyle Park
Bronze medal – third place	2025 Eindhoven	Freestyle Park

Sasha Pardoe (born 19 January 2006) is a British cyclist who competes in Freestyle BMX. She won gold at the 2024 European BMX Championships.

== Early and personal life ==
From Stourbridge, she is coached by her father, Gavin, a former time trial road racer for Great Britain. As a teenager she was in the Army Cadet Force. In 2023, she was completing an apprenticeship to train as a chef.

== Career ==
Pardoe is coached by former Olympian Declan Brooks. She competed in the Freestyle Park for Great Britain and Northern Ireland at the 2022 European Championships in her major championship debut, and placed sixth overall. That year, she finished second behind Charlotte Worthington at the British National Championships.

Her second competitive senior international competition was the 2023 World Championships in Glasgow, in which she also qualified for the final.

In July 2024, she became British national champion. She won gold at the 2024 European BMX Championships in Cadenazzo, Switzerland in September 2024.

Pardoe won the bronze medal in the Freestyle BMX at the 2025 European BMX Championships in Eindhoven, in October 2025. She subsequently had two top-10 finishes in World Cup events in 2025. Prior to competing at the 2025 World Championships in Saudi Arabia in November 2025 she fractured her shoulder blade when she fell during practice. She placed second at the British National BMX Freestyle Series in Shropshire in March 2026.
