= Hangzhou Public Bicycle =

Bicycle sharing system of Hangzhou, China

Overview
- Locale: Hangzhou, China
- Transit type: Bicycle sharing system
- Number of stations: >5,500
- Website: http://www.hzsggzxc.com/index.aspx

Operation
- Began operation: May 2008
- Operator: Hangzhou Public Transport Corporation
- Number of vehicles: >140,000

Hangzhou Public Bicycle (Chinese: 杭州公共自行车; pinyin: Hángzhōu gōnggòng zìxíngchē) is a bicycle sharing system serving the city of Hangzhou. It is the first bike-sharing system in China. As of 2024, over 140,000 bicycles are offered at more than 5,500 service points, making it one of the largest bike sharing systems in the world.

Due to growing motorized traffic congestion and concerns over the environment, the Hangzhou Public Transport Corporation launched bike-sharing on May 1, 2008, initially starting with 2,800 bicycles, 30 fixed stations, and 30 mobile stations (stations which can be moved to meet demand). In March 2011, it had 60,600 bicycles, and 2,416 stations. The Hangzhou government invested 180 million yuan ($26.35 million) to launch the program, and 270 million yuan ($39.53 million) in discounted loans.

== Goals ==
The purpose of the Hangzhou bike-sharing system is to provide a free public bike system network for residents and tourists; the bikes act as a feeder into its public transit network. Hangzhou bike-sharing uses the concept of the last mile (or the last kilometer) to make sure that users can easily get from public transit stops to their destinations through bikes to complete their journey.

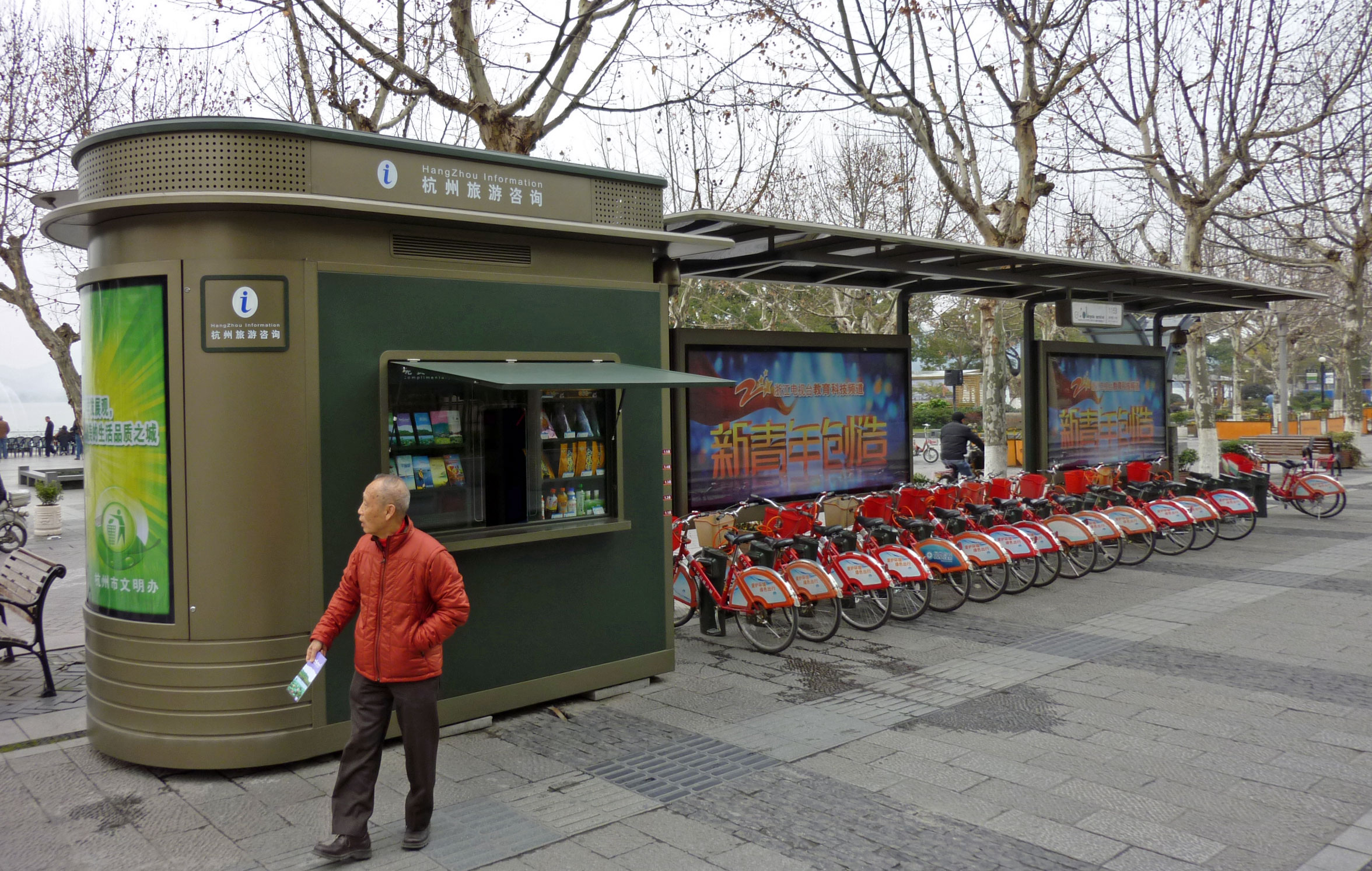
Hangzhou bike sharing station adjacent to West Lake

== Technology and pricing ==
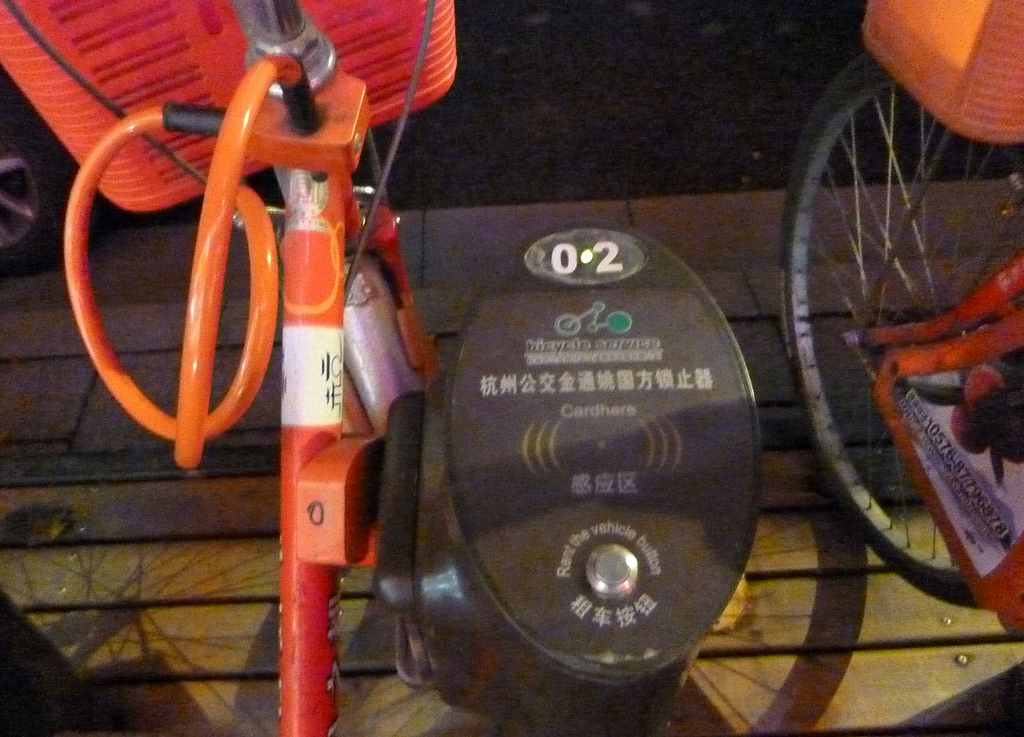
Bike release/lock panels

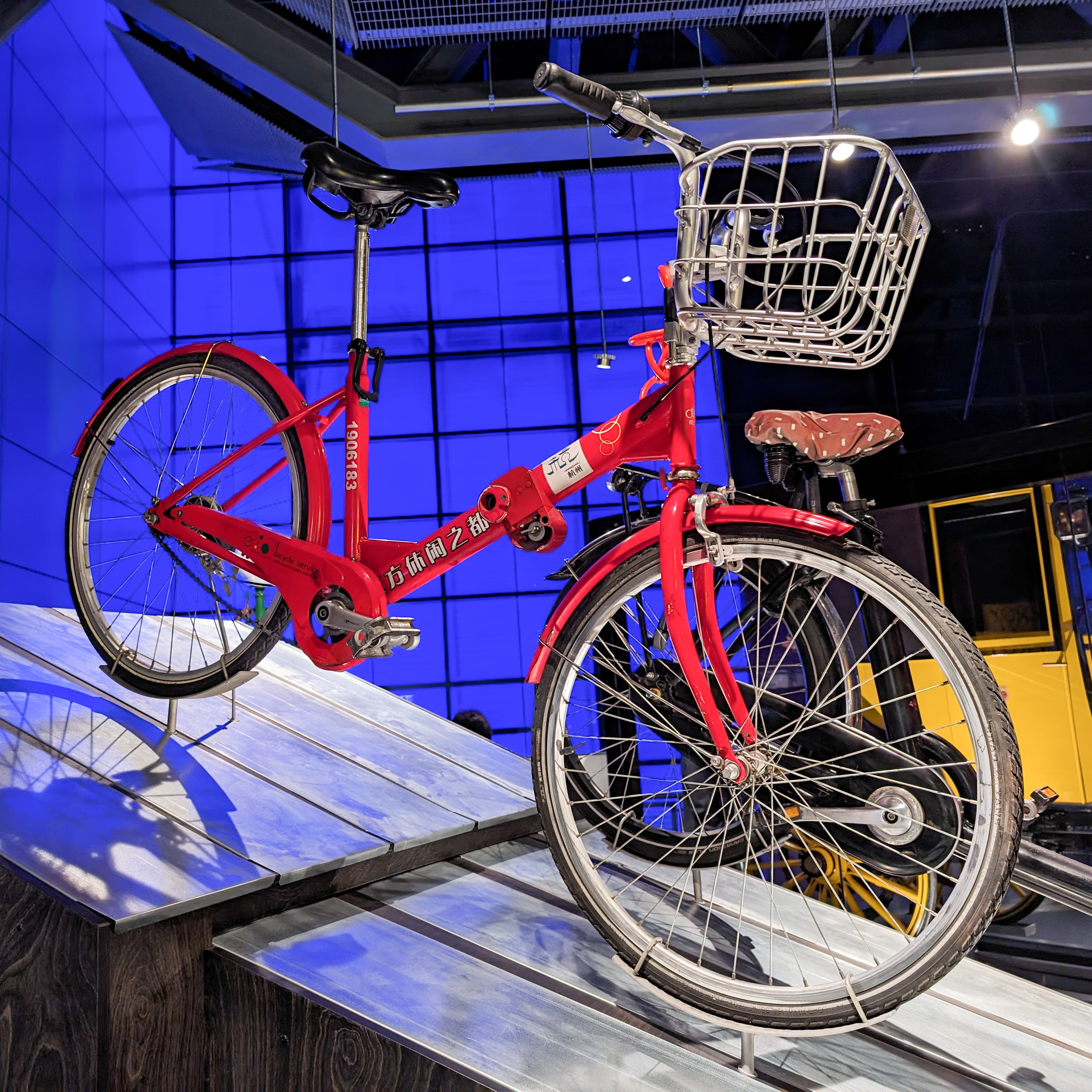
Bicycle from the scheme

Hangzhou Public Bicycle uses smart-card technology, automated check in and check out, and distinguishable bicycle docking stations. For the smart-card, the system requires an initial 200 yuan ($30) deposit for bike-sharing use. Hangzhou Public Bicycle has real-time information tracking current usage of bike-docking station, or a redistribution strategy to ensure all bicycle docking stations meet proper demand.

For the first hour, users can ride for free; at the second hour, a user has to pay an additional 1 yuan ($0.15); at the third hour, the user has to pay an additional 2 yuan ($0.30), and any additional hours cost 3 yuan/hr ($0.44/hr). Users pay for the duration of time a bike has been checked in and checked out of a station, so it is possible for a user to ride around the entire city for free.

The public bikes were initially available from 6am to 9pm. However, as of September 2015, the time for borrowing a bike has been extended to midnight.

In October 2010, a smartphone app called Palm Hangzhou, which tells bikeshare users how many bicycles each bike-share station has, was released by third-party developer Zhang Guangyu. However, despite popularity among users, Hangzhou Public Bicycle accused Zhang of illegally obtaining the bikeshare data. As of March 2012, the app does not work anymore as Zhang's IP address was blocked from using the data for the app.

== Early adoption and behavioral response ==
A survey of Hangzhou Public Bicycle members and non-members was implemented between January 2010 and March 2010 in order to examine the impacts of this service on travel behavior and to gain an early understanding of adoption and behavioral response. The study found that 30% of Hangzhou bikeshare users incorporated bikesharing into their most common commute. Furthermore, the bikeshare system captured modal share from bus transit, walking, autos, and taxis. Another key finding in this study suggests that car ownership may not reduce the likelihood of bikesharing use. In fact, members of the Hangzhou system exhibited a higher rate of auto ownership in comparison to non-members.
