= Deng Yawen =

Chinese BMX rider (born 2005)

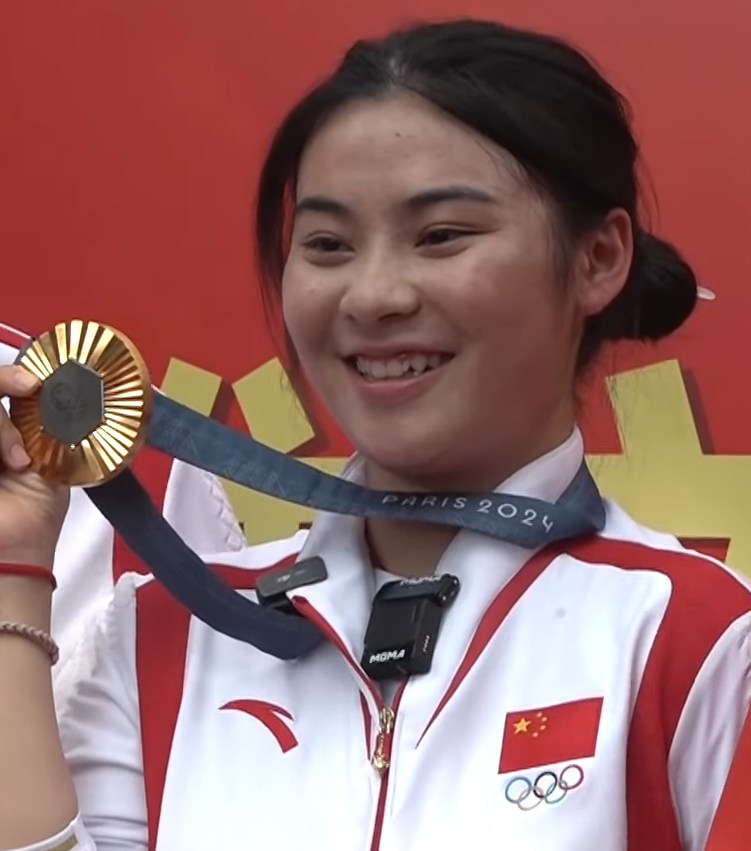
- Deng in 2024

Personal information
- Full name: Deng Yawen
- Born: 17 October 2005 (age 20) Luzhou, Sichuan, China

Sport
- Country: China
- Sport: Freestyle BMX
- Coached by: Daniel Dhers
Medal record
Women's BMX
Representing China
Olympic Games
| Gold medal – first place | 2024 Paris | BMX freestyle |

Deng Yawen (Chinese: 邓雅文; pinyin: Dèng Yǎwén, born 17 October 2005) is a Chinese freestyle BMX cyclist and Olympic champion. She won the gold medal in the women's BMX freestyle event at the 2024 Summer Olympics.

== Career ==
At eight years old, Deng joined the Luzhou Amateur Athletic School's track and field team, where she participated in javelin. She began BMX freestyle in 2017, at age 12.

She finished second at the 2021 Chinese National Games and third at the 2022 Chinese Championships. In 2023, she made her international debut and won a gold medal at the Asian Championships and finished sixth at the 2023 UCI BMX Freestyle World Championships. In October 2023, she won the UCI BMX Freestyle World Cup in Bazhong ahead of world champion Hannah Roberts. She is coached by Daniel Dhers.

=== 2024 Olympics ===
In early 2024, she was selected to compete at the 2024 Olympic Qualifier Series. During the first leg of the qualifier series in Shanghai, she finished in third place with a score of 91.50. During the second leg of the qualifier series in Budapest, she finished in fourth place with a score of 90.96. As a result, she qualified to represent China at the 2024 Summer Olympics.

In the women's BMX freestyle event, where she was the youngest competitor, she won a gold medal with a score of 92.60, ahead of American Perris Benegas and Australian Natalya Diehm. Deng Yawen was the only cyclist to score more than 90 points in all her four runs, including qualification and final. She became the first Chinese to win a medal in the event and the first to capture gold.

== Competitive history ==
All results are sourced from the Union Cycliste Internationale.

As of August 6th, 2024

=== Olympic Games ===
| Event | Freestyle Park |
|---|---|
| (France) 2024 Paris | Gold |

=== UCI Cycling World Championships ===
| Event | Freestyle Park |
|---|---|
| (United Kingdom) 2023 Glasgow | 6th |

=== UCI BMX Freestyle Park World Cup ===
| Season | 1 | 2 | 3 | 4 | Rank | Points |
|---|---|---|---|---|---|---|
| 2023 | DIR — | MON; 5 | BRU — | BAZ; 1 | 17 | 720 |
| 2024 | ENO; 3 | MON — | SHA | | 9 | 820 |
