= Cycling at the 2024 Summer Olympics – Women's BMX freestyle =

Women's BMX freestyle at the Games of the XXXIII Olympiad
- Olympic BMX cycling
- Venue: Place de la Concorde
- Date: 30–31 July 2024
- Competitors: 12 from 10 nations

Medalists
1st place, gold medalist(s)		Deng Yawen	China
2nd place, silver medalist(s)		Perris Benegas	United States
3rd place, bronze medalist(s)		Natalya Diehm	Australia

The women's BMX freestyle event at the 2024 Summer Olympics took place on 30 July and 31 July 2024 at the Place de la Concorde. 12 cyclists from ten nations competed.

== Competition format ==
The competition is a two-round tournament, with a qualification round and a final. Each round has the cyclists all do two runs. The runs are 60 seconds long. Five judges give scores between 0.00 and 99.99 based on the difficulty and execution of the rider's run; the scores are averaged for a total run score. In the qualification round, the rider's two run scores are averaged to give a total qualification score. These qualification scores are used to determine the start order of the cyclists in the final, providing a knowledge advantage to the later riders. In the final, only the better score of the two runs counts.

== Schedule ==
The event took place over two consecutive days.

Legend
H	Heats/preliminaries	¼	Quarter-finals	LC	Last chance run	½	Semi-finals	F	Final

Event↓/Date →	Sat 27	Sun 28	Mon 29	Tue 30	Wed 31	Thu 1	Fri 2	Sat 3	Sun 4
BMX Freestyle
Women's freestyle				Q	F				

== Results ==
=== Qualification ===
The top nine cyclists advanced to the final. The qualification phase also determined the start order for the final. The best ranked rider from the qualification started last in the final.

Rank	Cyclist	Nation	Run 1	Run 2	Average	Notes
1	Hannah Roberts	United States	91.80	91.10	91.45	Q
2	Deng Yawen	China	90.36	91.70	91.03	Q
3	Sun Jiaqi	China	88.00	87.66	87.83	Q
4	Perris Benegas	United States	86.20	84.68	85.44	Q
5	Iveta Miculyčová	Czech Republic	83.60	85.33	84.46	Q
6	Queen Saray Villegas	Colombia	81.60	87.25	84.42	Q
7	Macarena Perez Grasset	Chile	85.13	83.36	84.24	Q
8	Natalya Diehm	Australia	81.66	86.12	83.89	Q
9	Laury Perez	France	83.64	82.88	83.26	Q
10	Nikita Ducarroz	Switzerland	79.04	80.53	79.78	
11	Charlotte Worthington	Great Britain	79.20	78.82	79.01	
12	Kim Lea Müller	Germany	75.80	80.10	77.95	

=== Final ===
Rank	Cyclist	Nation	Run 1	Run 2	Best Run
1st place, gold medalist(s)	Deng Yawen	China	92.50	92.60	92.60
2nd place, silver medalist(s)	Perris Benegas	United States	83.40	90.70	90.70
3rd place, bronze medalist(s)	Natalya Diehm	Australia	88.80	87.70	88.80
4	Queen Saray Villegas	Colombia	64.80	88.00	88.00
5	Macarena Perez Grasset	Chile	83.80	84.55	84.55
6	Iveta Miculyčová	Czech Republic	82.30	8.60	82.30
7	Sun Jiaqi	China	70.80	60.10	70.80
8	Hannah Roberts	United States	70.00	5.42	70.00
9	Laury Perez	France	2.80	64.30	64.30

== See also ==
- Cycling at the 2024 Summer Olympics – Men's BMX freestyle
