= Natalya Diehm =

Australian bicycle motocross rider (born 1997)

Personal information
- Full name: Natalya Diehm
- Born: 23 September 1997 (age 29) Gladstone, Queensland, Australia

Cycling career
- Sport: Cycling
- Discipline: BMX
- Role: Rider
- Rider type: Freestyle
Medal record
Women's freestyle BMX
Representing Australia
Olympic Games
Bronze medal – third place	2024 Paris	BMX freestyle

Natalya Diehm (born 23 September 1997) is an Australian cyclist who competes in Freestyle BMX. She was a bronze medalist at the 2024 Summer Olympics.

== Biography ==
Diehm was born in Gladstone, Queensland, and grew up in nearby Boyne Island. She started riding BMX at the age of eight.

Diehm is openly gay.

== Career ==
Diehm finished 6th at the 2019 UCI Urban Cycling World Championships at Australia's first appearance in the event. In 2019 she won the inaugural Oceania Championships as well as winning the Australian national title. In total she has three national titles.

After recovering from her fourth knee reconstruction in late 2018, Diehm was discouraged from pursuing her Olympic ambitions and almost left the sport. However, she received motivation from BMX racing world champion and Olympian Caroline Buchanan who contacted Diehm to offer encouragement and support which prompted Diehm to continue.

=== Olympic Games ===
Diehm made history as one of Australia's first Olympic BMX freestylers when the discipline made its Games debut at the 2020 Tokyo Olympic Games. As the only two Australian BMX freestylers selected, Diehm became the first Australian woman to compete in the women's event while Logan Martin became the first Australian man to compete in the men's event. Despite suffering a ruptured ACL two weeks prior, Diehm reached the women's freestyle final, finishing fifth.

In July 2024, she became the first Australian woman to win a medal in BMX Freestyle Park event, winning bronze at the 2024 Paris Olympic Games. She placed eighth in the qualification round and had to perform second in the final. She scored 88.80 in the first run to provisionally place in a silver-medal position. She didn't improve in the second run despite coming out with front-flip and eventually placed in the third.

== Competitive history ==
All results are sourced from the Union Cycliste Internationale.

As of August 5th, 2024

=== Olympic Games ===
Event	Freestyle Park
(Japan) 2020 Tokyo	5th
(France) 2024 Paris	Bronze

=== UCI Cycling World Championships ===
Event	Freestyle Park
(China) 2019 Chengdu	6th
(France) 2021 Montpellier	—
(United Arab Emirates) 2022 Abu Dhabi	—
(United Kingdom) 2023 Glasgow	21st

=== UCI BMX Freestyle Park World Cup ===
Season	1	2	3	4	Rank	Points
2023	DIR —	MON; 12	BRU; 7	BAZ; 4	11	1010
2024	ENO; 5	MON —	SHA		11	720
