= Aiko (Japanese singer) =

Japanese singer-songwriter (born 1975)

- 柳井愛子
- Born: Aiko Yanai; 22 November 1975 (age 50); Suita, Osaka, Japan
- Occupations: Singer; songwriter
- Years active: 1996–present
- Spouse: Unknown (m. 2020)
- Musical career
- Genre: J-pop
- Instruments: Vocals; keyboards
- Label: Pony Canyon
- Website: aiko.com

Aiko Yanai (柳井愛子, Yanai Aiko; born 22 November 1975), known simply as Aiko (stylized in smallcaps), is a Japanese singer and songwriter. She is most famous for her hit songs Ashita, Kabutomushi, Hanabi, Sakura no Toki, Boyfriend, and Kira Kira.

== Overview ==
Aiko is one of the few artists whose music was not available on any subscription streaming services in Japan for many years. However, from midnight on 26 February 2020, her catalog became available on major subscription platforms.

On 14 December 2021, during the final show of her concert tour "Love Like Pop Vol. 22", she told fans that she had married a younger man sometime in 2020. They first met when one of Aiko's friends attended her concert together with him; he had long been a fan of Aiko.

=== Notation in songwriting credits ===
While her stage name as a singer is written as "aiko", her songwriting credits are registered as "AIKO". She had decided before her major debut that she wanted to use a romanized name, but had not firmly settled on whether it would be written in upper- or lowercase letters. When she applied to JASRAC, it ended up being registered in all caps as "AIKO". On the omnibus album Dōtei Omnibus CD Vol.1, both the artist name and the lyricist/composer credits are written as "AIKO", but from astral box onward, the artist name has been written as "aiko" while the lyricist/composer credits remain "AIKO".

=== Official Fan Club ===
The official fan club is called "BABY PEENATS". The name was coined by Aiko herself, inspired by Snoopy, which she loves.

== Music career ==
In April 1996, Aiko became a radio host of FM Osaka after graduating from college. She released a CD which she produced independently with her friends of college in August. She participated in "The 5th Music Quest Japan Final" on 10 October, and was awarded the Excellence Award shared with Ringo Shiina. She released an EP on an independent label in 1997, followed by a single and a mini-album in 1998.

In July 1998, Aiko debuted on a major label with her first single, "Ashita" (あした), which was used as the theme song for the movie Toire no Hanako-san. In 1999, her fourth single "Hanabi"(花火) became a smash hit.

In 2000, her second album, Sakura no Ki no Shita (桜の木の下), reached number one on the Oricon weekly charts, with the total CD sales amounting to 1.4 million copies. Her sixth single, "Boyfriend", sold over 500,000 copies and became her best-selling CD single. She made her first appearance in NHK's 2000 Kohaku Uta Gassen.

== History ==
=== Before debut ===
Aiko was born on 22 November 1975 in Suita, Osaka Prefecture. Due to family circumstances, she spent some time living at a relative's house from her upper elementary school years, and it was around this time that she began aiming to become a singer.

As a junior high school student, she told family friend and singer-songwriter Hiroshi Madoka about her dream of becoming a singer, but he advised her against it, saying that it would be a difficult path.

In high school, she began composing songs on the piano. While attending Osaka Prefectural Higashi-Yodogawa High School, she served as vice president of the student council and also played in a band with friends until graduation.

In May 1995, while enrolled at Osaka College of Music Junior College, she participated in the 9th TEENS’ MUSIC FESTIVAL and performed "Aitsu o Furimukaseru Hōhō" ("How to Make Him Turn Around"), a song she had written and composed herself,[note 2] winning the Grand Prix.

In April 1996, after graduating from junior college, she became a presenter on FM Osaka's COUNTDOWN KANSAI TOP40, and subsequently hosted three radio programs in total.[note 3] Around August of the same year, she released the independently produced Dōtei Omnibus CD Vol.1, created jointly with friends as her graduation project.

In October, she entered The 5th MUSIC QUEST JAPAN FINAL, where she received the Excellence Award alongside artists such as Ringo Sheena. [note 4]

In 1997, a producer from Pony Canyon contacted Aiko after noticing her at contests, and on 20 December she released the indie album astral box. In 1998, she released her first indie single "Hachimitsu" and her second indie album Girlie. In April, she was approached to sing a film theme song, and talks progressed toward her major-label debut.

=== After debut ===
In July 1998, Aiko made her major-label debut with her first single, "Ashita". The song was used as the theme for the film Shinsei Toilet no Hanako-san, gaining significant attention particularly on FM radio stations in the Kansai region. She also held her first solo concert, "Love Like Pop!", at Esaka Boomin Hall.

In 1999, her third single "Hanabi" became a hit, remaining on the Oricon charts for an extended period. She also made her first appearance on Music Station, bringing her national prominence.

In 2000, her second album Sakura no Ki no Shita reached No. 1 on the weekly Oricon chart. The album became a major commercial success, selling 1.4 million copies and earning the Japan Gold Disc Award for Rock Album of the Year. The single "Boyfriend", released the same year, sold over 500,000 copies and led to her first appearance on the 51st NHK Kōhaku Uta Gassen.

In 2001, her album Natsufuku became her second consecutive million-seller and again received the Japan Gold Disc Award for Rock Album of the Year. In July, she began the concert tour "Love Like Pop Vol.6". During the Fukuoka performance, she injured her throat and was later diagnosed with acute laryngopharyngitis caused by vocal nodules. Some performances were postponed, but after recovering, she held additional shows and successfully completed the tour.

In 2003, Aiko appeared in her first television commercial, for Glico Café Au Lait, which aired nationwide. Both Kyushu-only versions (Miyazaki and Kagoshima) and national versions were produced, featuring her songs "Chōchō Musubi" and "Andromeda". On 30 August, she held her first outdoor "guerrilla" free concert, "Love Like Aloha", at Katase Nishihama Beach. Despite being announced only shortly beforehand on mobile sites and her official website, the event attracted 25,000 attendees. In October, she performed at Aoyama Gakuin University's school festival, her first such appearance in about four years.

In 2005, her single "Kira Kira" was selected as the theme song for the television drama Ganbatte Ikimasshoi. Her artist book aiko bon was published by Sony Magazines, detailing aspects of her upbringing and path to debut that had rarely been discussed previously. In Oricon's annual ranking, "Favorite Artists Selected by 20,000 Music Fans", she placed first for two consecutive years, 2005 and 2006.

Following the release of Kanojo, the album debuted at No. 1 on the Oricon charts. On 30 August, she held her second outdoor guerrilla free concert, "Love Like Aloha Vol.2", at Southern Beach Chigasaki. Although a heavy downpour struck right before the show began, the event was completed successfully, drawing an audience of 25,000.

In 2007, she released her first double A-side and 22nd single, "Hoshi no Nai Sekai / Yokogao". The song "Yokogao" was used as the theme song for the TV drama Hotaru no Hikari.

In 2008, she released her 8th album Himitsu on 2 April. Celebrating the 10th anniversary of her major-label debut, she launched the campaign "aiko 10th Anniversary Chotto Ureshii Happy Surprise". As the first installment, reissued editions of all previously released albums (first-press versions) were released. As part of the campaign, she held the live house tour "Ura Love Like Rock ~ 60-fun Ippon Shōbu", open only to winners who purchased Himitsu and applied through a special website. She also held the regular national hall tour "Love Like Pop Vol.11" across 20 venues. As the fourth installment of the campaign, she held her third outdoor guerrilla free concert in two years, "Love Like Aloha Vol.3", at Southern Beach Chigasaki. Despite heavy rain and strong winds the night before, the show was successfully completed, drawing 28,000 attendees.

In 2009, her double A-side and 25th single "Milk / Nageki no Kiss" reached No. 1 on the Oricon Weekly Singles Chart for the first time in her career. It marked the first time in 7 years and 8 months that an artist more than 10 years post-debut achieved their first No. 1 on that chart, following N.M.L.'s "Zero Landmine". That same year, she provided the song "Ano Ko no Yume" as the theme for the NHK morning drama Welkame, and performed the song—which had not yet been included on any single or album—at the 60th NHK Kōhaku Uta Gassen (later included on the 2010 album Baby). From July to September, she held the live house tour "Love Like Rock Vol.4", followed by the hall tour "Love Like Pop Vol.12" from October to February 2010.

In 2010, she released her 26th single "Modorenai Ashita" on 3 February, followed by her first album in two years, the 9th album Baby, on 31 March. About one month later, on 21 April, she released her 27th single "Mukaiawase". Beginning with Yokohama Arena on 24 April, she launched her first national arena tour, "Love Like Pop Vol.13", covering 7 locations and 10 performances. In June, she held additional shows—including her first-ever performance at Yoyogi National Gymnasium First Gymnasium—under the title "Love Like Pop vol.13 Tottemo Ureshii TsuiKa Kōen. Tsukiyo no Ban ni Kanojo wa Arawaru".

On 23 February 2011, in her 13th year since debut, she released her first best albums, Matome I and Matome II, simultaneously. Starting in April, she held the national hall tour "Love Like Pop Vol.14". The Sendai performance was postponed due to the Great East Japan Earthquake but was later held in August. On 11 May, she released her 28th double A-side single "Koi no Super Ball / Home". In August, she held the fully invitation-only special live event "'Calpis Water' presents aiko Special Live" at Club Quattro in Shibuya and Shinsaibashi. Beginning 22 October, she held the live house tour "Love Like Rock Vol.5", and on 23 November, she released her 29th single "Zutto".

On 21 March 2012, she released her first music video compilation in approximately five and a half years, Utau Inu 4. On 5 May, she performed her song "Kuchibiru" on Music Station, and radio airplay for the track began later that evening. Starting 9 May, the song was used in commercials for Ito En's "Futatsu no Hataraki Catechin Jasmine Tea". On 20 June, she released her 10th album Toki no Silhouette, her first in 2 years and 3 months, which included previously released singles such as "Mukaiawase", "Koi no Super Ball / Home", "Zutto", as well as the new song "Kuchibiru". Beginning in July, she held the national hall tour "aiko Live Tour Love Like Pop Vol.15" (21 locations, 31 performances). On 30 August, she held her first outdoor guerrilla free concert in four years, "Love Like Aloha Vol.4", at Southern Beach Chigasaki, attracting 31,000 people despite being announced only via the official website and mobile site.

On 19 and 20 January 2013, as additional performances to the previous year's tour, she launched the arena tour "Love Like Pop Vol.15 add", starting at Yokohama Arena, which included her first performance at Saitama Super Arena. Beginning 13 July, in celebration of the 15th anniversary of her major debut, she simultaneously held four tours—including a fan-club-exclusive tour—("Love Like Rock Vol.0", "Love Like Rock Vol.6", "Love Like Pop Vol.16", and "Love Like Pop Vol.16.5"). On 17 July, immediately after the tours began, she released her 30th double A-side single "Loveletter / Shigatsu no Ame". Beginning 3 September, the previously unreleased song "Kimi no Tonari" was used in commercials for Lotte Ghana Milk Chocolate. A scheduled 4 October performance at NHK Hall was postponed due to illness, and she withdrew from scheduled live TV appearances; however, after completing the rescheduled show on 4 December, she finished all tour dates.

On 29 January 2014, she released the single "Kimi no Tonari", which had already been featured in TV commercials and some live performances since the previous year. On 28 May, she released her first album in about two years, the 11th album Awa no Yō na Ai Datta. Beginning 24 June at Yokosuka Arts Theatre, she held the national hall tour "Love Like Pop Vol.17" (19 locations, 30 shows). From 31 October, she held the arena tour "Love Like Pop Vol.17.5" (3 locations, 6 shows). While on tour, she released her 32nd single "Atashi no Mukō" on 12 November. The song was used as the theme for the TV drama Suteki na Sen Taxi, and she made her first drama appearance in Episode 9, playing the role of Hiromi Numakoshi, a clothing store clerk often mistaken for "Aiko the singer".

On 29 April 2015, she released her 33rd single "Yumemiru Sukima". Beginning 18 April at Zepp Tokyo, she held Love Like Rock Vol.7, the longest and largest venue-based live house tour of her career (25 shows across 7 cities). During the 27 July Zepp Tokyo performance, immediately after the main show ended, she announced the surprise revival of the outdoor free guerrilla live "Love Like Aloha Vol.5." The concert was held on 30 August at Southern Beach Chigasaki. Her new song "Aizu" was selected as the theme song for the film Senpai to Kanojo, released 17 October. She held Love Like Pop Vol.18 at Yokohama Arena on 26–27 December and at Osaka-jō Hall on 31 December, which marked her first-ever countdown concert.

In 2016, she released her 12th album May Dream on 18 May, her first album in two years. Beginning 21 May at Ichikawa City Cultural Hall, she held Love Like Pop Vol.19, totaling 34 performances.

Beginning 27 April 2017 at Zepp Tokyo, she held Love Like Rock Vol.8, performing 31 shows across 9 locations nationwide.

On 6 June 2018, she released her 13th album Shimetta Natsu no Hajimari, her first album in two years. Starting on 8 June at the Kawasaki City Sports and Culture Center (Culz Kawasaki), she launched Love Like Pop Vol.20, performing 45 shows across 27 venues—the largest scale of her career at the time. On 9 August, she announced the sixth edition of her outdoor free concert Love Like Aloha Vol.6, her first in three years. The concert was held on 30 August at Southern Beach Chigasaki and is said to have drawn about 37,000 attendees.

In 2019, she provided the song "Melon Soda" as the campaign theme for FM802's Access Project. The song was made available for limited rental at TSUTAYA. On 5 June, she released her first best-of album in eight years, aiko no Uta., a four-disc set compiling 56 tracks, including 42 single A-sides (including double A-sides) released up to that point, along with selected B-sides. On 29–30 August, she performed in Tatekawa Danshun 35th Anniversary Performance Tamayura ~tamayura~. Beginning 5 October at Zepp Tokyo, she held Love Like Rock Vol.9. Around this time, her longtime music producer stepped away due to various circumstances, and from then on her activities effectively shifted to self-production.

On 26 February 2020, she released her 39th single "Aozora", featuring arrangements by Toomi Yoh. At the same time, her entire catalog became available on major subscription-based streaming services. She appeared as a guest vocalist on "Good Morning ~ Blue Daisy feat. aiko", a new track on Tokyo Ska Paradise Orchestra's best album TOKYO SKA TREASURES – Best of Tokyo Ska Paradise Orchestra released on 18 March. This marked her first release of a song written and composed by someone else since her debut single. Along with "Aozora," she also performed with Tokyo Ska Paradise Orchestra on music programs. Due to the spread of COVID-19, her Zepp Tokyo performances scheduled for 7–8 March were postponed, with new dates set for December 2021. As a substitute measure, on the days of the postponed shows, she streamed her first-ever no-audience live performance, Love Like Rock vol.9 ~ Betsuwaku-chan ~, for free on her official YouTube channel "aiko Official," reaching 130,000 live viewers. On 30 August, she premiered the online event Love Like Aloha Memories: Sunahama ni Motte Ikareta Ashi on her official YouTube channel, featuring re-edited footage from past Love Like Aloha concerts, including some previously unreleased clips. She also made a surprise appearance in the ending, announcing her upcoming online concert. Although a national tour had originally been planned for late 2020, it was postponed without announcement due to the pandemic. On 17 October, she held her first paid, pre-recorded no-audience online concert, Love Like Rock ~ Betsuwaku-chan vol.2 ~. As with a regular tour, merchandise was sold, and streaming ticket purchasers received physical items including paper tickets, questionnaires, and silver tape used in special effects. Four days later, on 21 October, she released her 40th single "Honey Memory."

In 2021, on 3 March, she released her 14th album Dōshitatte Tsutaerarenai Kara, her first album in 2 years and 9 months. She was scheduled to begin the national tour Love Like Pop Vol.22 on 14 May, but five performances—including opening night—were postponed due to the extension of Japan's state of emergency and event guidelines in response to COVID-19. The tour officially began on 8 June at Tokyo Garden Theater. Due to infection conditions and local government guidelines, four additional performances in the Kanto region scheduled for 19 August, 31 August, 1 September, and 7 September (the 7 September Hachioji performance was originally the 14 May opening show, postponed again) were postponed but eventually completed on 14 December. The postponed final two dates of Love Like Rock Vol.9 from 2020 were rescheduled and held over five days—1, 2, 6, 7 December, and 22—at Zepp Tokyo. Because of event restrictions, all shows were fully seated rather than standing, but all were successfully held. With Zepp Tokyo closing on 1 January 2022, these performances became her final shows at the venue; she performed there a total of 61 times, the second-highest number after Hyde.

On 27 December 2022, she made her first-ever festival appearance at FM802 ROCK FESTIVAL RADIO CRAZY 2022, held at Intex Osaka. During her performance of "Melon Soda," Maguro Taniguchi (Kana-Boon), Hattori (Macaroni Enpitsu), and Satoshi Fujihara (Official Hige Dandism) made surprise guest vocal appearances, with Fujihara appearing only for that one song.

From 24 May – 28 September 2023, she held the nationwide tour aiko Live Tour Love Like Pop vol.23, covering 19 locations and 30 shows.

To commemorate the 25th anniversary of her debut, she held her first pop-up shop, aiko 25th anniversary exhibition, in Shibuya (Tokyo) and Umeda (Osaka). (Tower Records Shibuya and Umeda NU Chayamachi stores hosted the exhibition from 17 to 24 July 2023; SHIBUYA TSUTAYA hosted it from 18 to 24 July.) On 17 July, as the first wave of her analog reissue project, her first through fourth albums—Chiisana Marui Koujitsu, Sakura no Ki no Shita, Natsufuku, and Aki Soba ni Iru yo—were released as limited-production 180g vinyl. On 30 August, the second wave—her fifth through eighth albums, from Akatsuki no Love Letter to Himitsu—were released simultaneously as limited-production 180g vinyl. On 3 November, she released "Radio", a track previously included only as a bonus disc item in the first editions of Matome I / Matome II (2011), as a digital standalone release.

On 27 January 2024, she launched her first arena tour in about five years, aiko Live Tour "Love Like Pop vol.24", beginning at Osaka-jō Hall.

On 16 August of the same year, she released her 16th original album Zanshin Zansho. On 30 August, she held Love Like Aloha Vol.7 at Southern Beach Chigasaki, her first free outdoor concert in about six years following the COVID-19 pandemic. A live video of the event began exclusive distribution on Netflix starting 22 November of the same year. On 25 December, she released the limited-production 180g vinyl edition of Zanshin Zansho.

On 17 January 2025, she digitally released "Cinema", the theme song for the Nippon TV Saturday drama Ensemble. On 17 July, marking the 27th anniversary of her debut, she launched her official TikTok account.

== Personal life ==
On 14 December 2021, Aiko revealed on her live show performance that she had tied the knot with her significant other a year earlier.

=== Influences ===
The artists that Aiko has been influenced by include KAN, Sugar Babe, Yumi Matsutoya, DREAMS COME TRUE, Carole King, Jackson 5, Billy Joel, Stevie Wonder, and others.

She is also a fan of Southern All Stars and has covered their songs, as well as songs by Keisuke Kuwata, in free live performances at the Southern Beach Chigasaki. Kuwata has praised Aiko, calling her "a wonderful person," and in 2013, she covered "Kabutomushi" at the "Act Against AIDS 2013 Showa 88th Year! Second Solo Red and White Song Battle".

=== Musicality ===
Aiko tends to use chord progressions influenced by jazz. According to Seiko Kikuchi, her compositions are based on the blue note scale, which can be said to give her a blues-singer style.

While Aiko is often featured in the media for her thoughts on romance and fashion, when her music is covered, it's often focused solely on the lyrics, though her melodies and chord progressions also reveal extraordinary qualities.

During her "Love Like Pop" live tour series, she would improvise songs using keywords from the audience, showcasing her versatility as a melody maker . In 2020, in response to a request from Takashi Okamura (Ninety-Nine), she created the song "White Peach" on the spot. She shared it on her Twitter account, proving that her sense of creativity was still sharp.

Aiko has absorbed various genres from both Western and Japanese music, and according to her producer, the genre of her songs changes depending on the period of creation.

For those familiar with music theory, Aiko's songs may feel unusual in terms of chord progressions before the arrangement and chorus are added. It is often said that she intentionally uses strange chord progressions and melodies, which sometimes causes discomfort during the demo stages. Despite this, she has never thought that her songs are strange.

This approach began when she was surprised by the many rules in music school. She wanted to make music freely, as the songs she sang as a child felt more liberated. Her producer advised her not to memorize technical jargon but to communicate the sounds she hears in her head. Thus, she has adhered to a composition method that is free from logical thinking about chords. Even if the song's original form seems odd, she always manages to turn it into a pop song.

=== Songwriting process ===
Aiko is a "lyric-first" songwriter, and begins her songwriting with writing the lyrics first, then adding the melody. Often, the words won't fit into the melody line exactly, and she sometimes has to adjust them to make it work. As she writes the lyrics, a rough sense of the rhythm and phrasing starts to form in her mind. As she imagines it, the verses, bridge, and chorus naturally take shape. The most important part of the process is the phrasing, as the rise and fall of the lyrics transform directly into emotional expression through the melody.

She then composes the music on an electronic piano with her eyes closed, and randomly presses keys to start creating the song. As she creates more songs, they tend to become similar, but this helps prevent repetition. Once the basic structure of the song is complete, she plays it for her long-time producer, conveying the nuances of the words to guide the sound and arrangement. The producer then communicates the specifics of the arrangement to the arranger, and the three of them work together to complete the song. Since she works on the piano, she gives specific instructions for the keyboard parts.

For vocal takes, she freely sings during recording, and the producer selects the best take. Even when singing the same song, the melody changes slightly each time. Rather than worrying about whether it's pitch-perfect, she trusts the producer to choose the take that conveys the most emotion.

=== Fan community in Japan ===
In 2005, Aiko ranked No. 1 overall in the Oricon Favorite Artists Ranking. By demographic, she placed second among teenage girls, fourth among teenage boys, first among women in their 20s, and third among men in their 20s. She ranked third overall in the 30s age group and 14th in the 40s age group, indicating broad recognition across generations, with particularly strong support from women in their teens and 20s. She again ranked No. 1 overall in 2006, followed by No. 4 in 2007, No. 3 in 2008, No. 7 in 2009, and No. 5 in 2010.

=== Hobbies and preferences ===
Her favorite sports are swimming and volleyball; she took swimming lessons from childhood alongside piano lessons, while volleyball was a temporary yet active involvement through a school club. She is also skilled at drawing, having provided illustrations for tour merchandise and for cover artwork of her single such as Sakura no Toki and DECADE.

Aiko is an avid manga reader and often introduces her favorite works in magazines and tour pamphlets. These pamphlets have also included original illustrations contributed by manga artists. Since receiving a radio cassette player as a Christmas present in elementary school, she has also been a dedicated radio listener.

=== Favorite and disliked food ===
Likes: umeboshi (pickled plums), karashi mentaiko (spicy cod roe), yam.

Dislikes: bamboo shoots, eggplant, mitarashi dango.

=== Personal relationships ===
Yuka – Originally a devoted fan of Aiko. When Aiko appeared on the Waratte Iitomo! "Telephone Shocking" segment, she introduced Yuka on the program.

KAN – Considered one of Aiko's greatest artistic influences. In 2004, they performed "Kabutomushi" together at Act Against AIDS Live in Osaka. Aiko has also appeared as a guest on KAN's radio programs and concerts. She later joined the memorial project unit KAN with His Friends.

Keisuke Kuwata (Southern All Stars) – They have frequently appeared together on programs such as Music Station (TV Asahi). Both artists have publicly covered each other's songs and expressed mutual admiration. When Kadokawa Shoten published a special feature on Aiko in 2014, Kuwata contributed a special essay.

Sheena Ringo – As noted earlier, the two have known each other since before their major-label debuts.

Porno Graffitti – They became acquainted when the band moved from their hometown to work in Osaka. Their relationship deepened after co-hosting radio programs, eventually forming the unit "Jaken 4 Kyoudai". Subsequent albums list each other in their "Special Thanks" sections ("Aiko" in Porno Graffitti's releases, and "Porno Graffitti" in Aiko's releases).

Hiro Terahei – Has known her since before her debut. Aiko appeared on his radio program with each new CD release.

Shinya Arino – Aiko was a fan and followed him enthusiastically during high school.

Shinseido Machida (Record Store) – Two Shinseido stores—Lumine Machida and Machida Tokyu Twins—were widely regarded as "sacred place" for Aiko fans. Each location featured a dedicated Aiko corner, Aikodou (愛子堂, aikodou), given by Aiko herself. Some key characteristics are:

- A permanent "Aiko" genre section existed alongside standard J-POP categories.
- The Lumine Machida store closed on 31 July 2013, and relocated to Machida Tokyu Twins on 6 August 2013. The Twins store later closed on 30 July 2014.
- Store staff members were appointed as "Aikodou (愛子堂, aikodou) managers," a role passed down through generations. additionally, all major-label singles, albums, and DVDs were available for purchase.
- A message box allowed fans to send notes directly to Aiko, which staff delivered to her; Aiko once shared a photo on her official site showing herself reading these messages.
- The store was one of the few places where fans could listen to her independent-era recordings.
- After relocation to Tokyu Twins, the Aiko section expanded in size, and a handwritten autograph from Aiko celebrating the reopening was displayed.

== Concerts and live events ==
Aiko's live events and concert tours can be broadly categorized into three main types. First is the Love Like Pop tour, which primarily follows the release of an album after her major debut. Initially held in live houses, the tour later expanded to larger venues such as concert halls following her rise in popularity. Occasionally, large-scale concerts at arena-class venues such as the Nippon Budokan, Osaka-jo Hall, and Yokohama Arena feature "additional performances," which are not simply extra dates but often include substantial changes in the setlist and stage production to accommodate the larger venues.

The second type is the Love Like Rock tour, which began in 2002 and visits live houses nationwide. This tour is characterized by its rock-inspired atmosphere in terms of song selection, composition, and costume choices. Despite her status as a top artist, Aiko maintains a bold and aggressive approach, continuing to serve her fans with a spirit of humility and passion.

The third type is the Love Like Aloha tour, an occasional outdoor concert with no entrance fee. It consistently attracts 20,000 to 30,000 attendees despite usually being announced only a week in advance. This surprise event has become an annual late summer tradition for fans. The first event was held on 30 August 2003, at the western beach of Enoshima, Kanagawa, and subsequent events have been held in Chigasaki at Southern Beach on the same date in 2006, 2008, 2012, 2015, 2018, and 2024. Additionally, Aiko holds fan club-exclusive concerts, such as BABY PEENATS Meeting.

=== Live performances ===
Aiko is known for her highly praised live performances, which are often limited in number, turning each concert into a "platinum ticket" event. Despite performing around 20 songs per concert, the shows often extend for over 3 hours due to long MC segments. Venues range from Zepp-class to concert halls, sometimes featuring catwalks or other elements that reflect her personal touch in the stage design. These concerts are also marked by handmade touches, such as original questionnaires and creatively designed tour merchandise, which stand out in contrast to the polished productions typical of top artists.

Her unique audience interactions during MCs, including her signature call-and-response chants like "Men! Women! And everyone else!" (男子!女子!そうでない人!, Danshi! Joshi! Sōdenai hito!) have also become popular, occasionally imitated by other artists. Additionally, Aiko has gained fame for collecting audience-suggested themes for impromptu solo performances. However, since the opening night of Love Like Pop Vol.20 on 8 June 2018, she has stopped performing these impromptu acoustic songs. Another notable characteristic is that, compared to other artists with similar career length and concert scale, Aiko's ticket prices remain relatively affordable.

=== Setlist ===
Aiko's setlists are often made up of songs she personally wants to perform at that moment. Even on album tours, not all songs from the album are guaranteed to be performed. Since Love Like Pop Vol.14, it has become common for two consecutive concert dates to feature almost entirely different sets. If the tour lasts a longer period, the setlist may change between the first and second halves, or the songs may be adjusted to reflect the season. As a result, a single tour can feature as many as four different setlists. However, the basic structure, such as the arrangement of fast and slow songs, has remained consistent over the years. In recent years, the usual encore has evolved into double or triple encores, often with unexpected songs added to the setlist. For example, at the final performance of Love Like Pop Vol.18 on 31 December 2015, at Osaka-jo Hall, after a countdown and double encore, Aiko performed an additional eight songs, totaling 33 tracks, and the concert lasted over four and a half hours.

== Shows ==
List of concerts showing date, city, venue and notes
Year	Title	Date & Venue	Notes
1998	Love Like Pop!	15 September, Esaka Muse Boomin Hall, Osaka	First solo concert
1999	Love Like Pop vol.2	28 May, Umeda HEAT BEAT, Osaka; 6 June, Shibuya O-nest, Tokyo	A live tour to promote the album Chiisa na Marui Koujitsu (小さな丸い好日)
1999	Love Like Pop vol.3	13 December, Bottom Line, Aichi; 15–16 December, Umeda HEAT BEAT, Osaka; 20 December, Shibuya ON AIR EAST, Tokyo	First Tokyo, Nagoya and Osaka tour

== Discography ==
- Chiisa na Marui Koujitsu (小さな丸い好日) (1999)
- Sakura no Ki no Shita (桜の木の下) (2000)
- Natsufuku (夏服) (2001)
- Aki Soba ni Iru yo (秋 そばにいるよ) (2002)
- Akatsuki no Love Letter (暁のラブレター) (2003)
- Yume no Naka no Massugu na Michi (夢の中のまっすぐな道) (2005)
- Kanojo (彼女) (2006)
- Himitsu (秘密) (2008)
- Baby (2010)
- Toki no Silhouette (時のシルエット) (2012)
- Awa no You na Ai Datta (泡のような愛だった) (2014)
- May Dream (2016)
- Shimetta Natsu no Hajimari (湿った夏の始まり) (2018)
- Doushitatte Tsutaerarenaikara (どうしたって伝えられないから) (2021)
- Ima no Futari o Otagai ga Miteru (今の二人をお互いが見てる) (2023)
- Zan Kokoro Zansho (2024)
- Saigo ni Atsui Hibi o Kuruwashiki Omoi de (最後に熱い日々を狂わしき想いで) (2026)

== Performances ==
Tours

- "Love Like Pop" (1998, 1999, 2000, 2001, 2002, 2004, 2005, 2006, 2008, 2009, 2010, 2011, 2012, 2013, 2014, 2015)
- College musical festivals (1999, 2003; 7 places in all)
- "Baby Peenats Meeting" (2001, 2004; fan club members only)
- "Love Like Rock" (2002, 2003, 2006, 2007, 2017 (fan club members only), 2009; no-seat concerts, 2011, 2013, 2015 at Zepp Tokyo)
- "Love Like Aloha" (Summer 2003, at Katase beach, Enoshima; Summer 2006 and 2008, at Southern Beach, Chigasaki, 2012 and 2015)

== Appearances ==
Shorts

- Japanese manga artist Yukari Ichijo based the character "Eiko", in Pride (2002–2010) on Aiko, and Aiko has several times expressed admiration for Ichijo.
- Aiko also sang the insert song "KissHug" for the movie Hana Yori Dango Final which premiered on 28 June 2008 and "Mukai Awase" for the 2010 comedy film My Darling is a Foreigner.

Radio Aiko has presented several regular radio programs, including local radio programmes in the Kansai area before she achieved widespread fame in July 1998.

- Count Down Kansai Top40 (FM Osaka, April 1996 – December 2001)
- Poppun Kingdom (MBS, April 1997 – ?)
- Young Town Music Max (MBS, October 1997 – September 1999)
- Baby Peanuts (FM Osaka, October 1998 – ?)
- Aiko's @llnightnippon.com (NBS, November 1999 – March 2003), containing the popular musical feature Sing! Aiko.

== Books ==
- "Aiko Bon" (2005) was the first official book about Aiko. The book contains her autobiography (in an interview style), photos, feature articles from monthly magazine GbMusicnet and liner notes by herself.

== Awards ==
Year	Type	Title
1996	Music Quest Japan Final	Excellence Prize – Himawari ni Nattara
2000	Teen's Music Festival Final	Teen's Grand Prize – Aitsu o Furimukaseru Hoho
2000	Saku ya Kono Hana Award, Music (Osaka city)	* This award is given to a person or an organisation who contributes to a promotion of Osaka culture.
2002	Metropolitan Action on Smoking or Health	Stop-smoking Grand Prize
2002	The Japan Gold Disc Award	Rock Album of the Year – Natsufuku
2004	The Japan Gold Disc Award	Rock & Pop Album of the Year – Akatsuki no Love Letter
2018	MTV VMAJ	Best Female Video -Japan-
2020	Space Shower Music Awards	BEST POP ARTIST
