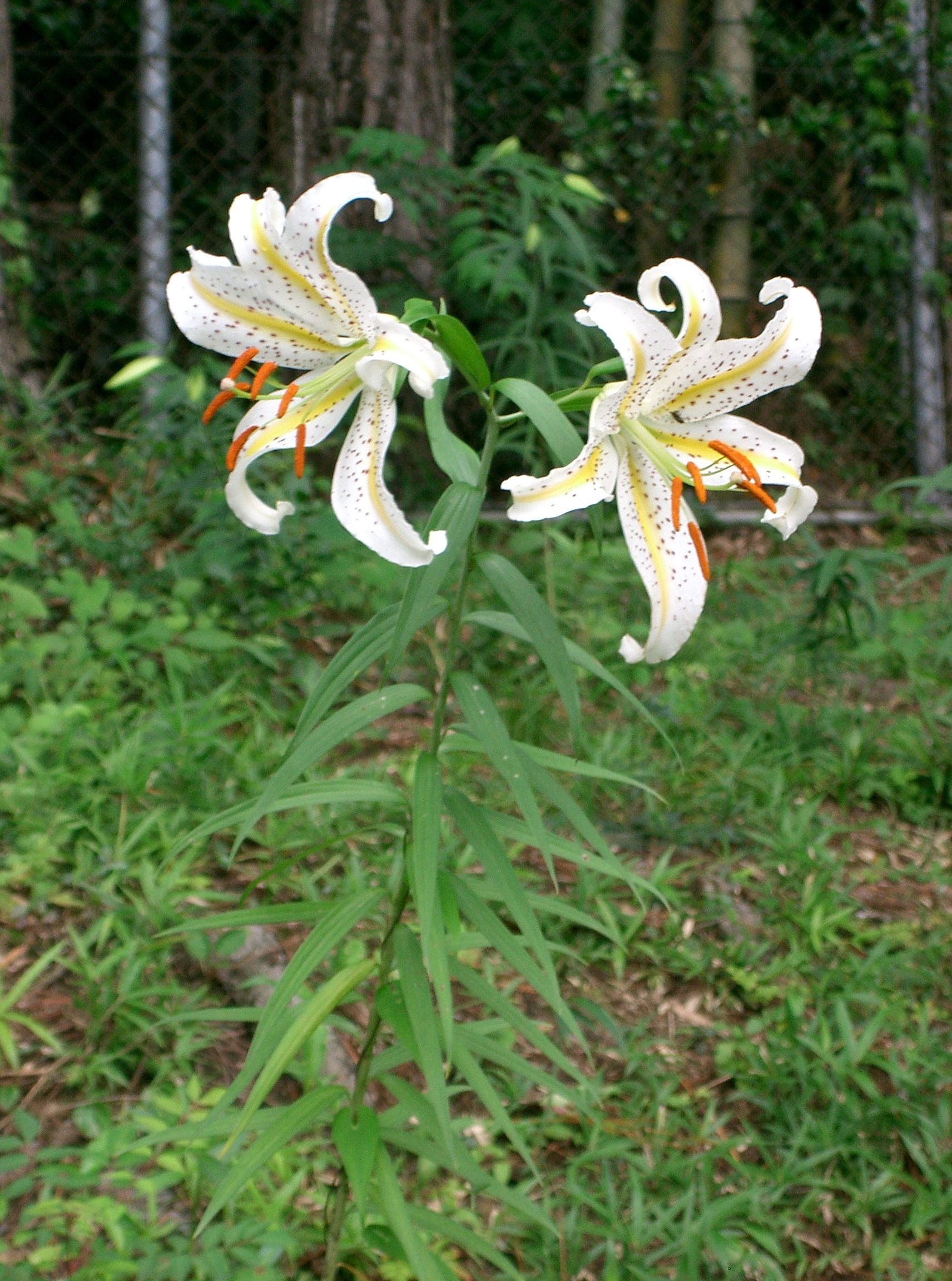

Scientific classification
- Kingdom: Plantae
- Clade: Embryophytes
- Clade: Tracheophytes
- Clade: Spermatophytes
- Clade: Angiosperms
- Clade: Monocots
- Order: Liliales
- Family: Liliaceae
- Subfamily: Lilioideae
- Genus: Lilium
- Species: L. auratum

Binomial name
- Lilium auratum Lindl.

= Lilium auratum =

Species of lily

Lilium auratum (山百合, yamayuri, literally "mountain lily") is one of the true lilies. It is native to Japan and is sometimes called the golden-rayed lily or the goldband lily.

== Description ==
The flower colour is typically white with gold radial markings and orange spots, but variations in flower colour and markings are known. For example, the variety platyphyllum which bears a gold stripe along the tepals but lacks spots. The strongly scented flowers are the largest of any lily species and the largest plants, which can reach 2.5 metres (8 ft), can carry up to twenty of these.

It has been used widely in breeding and many of the more spectacular modern cultivars are derived in part from this species.

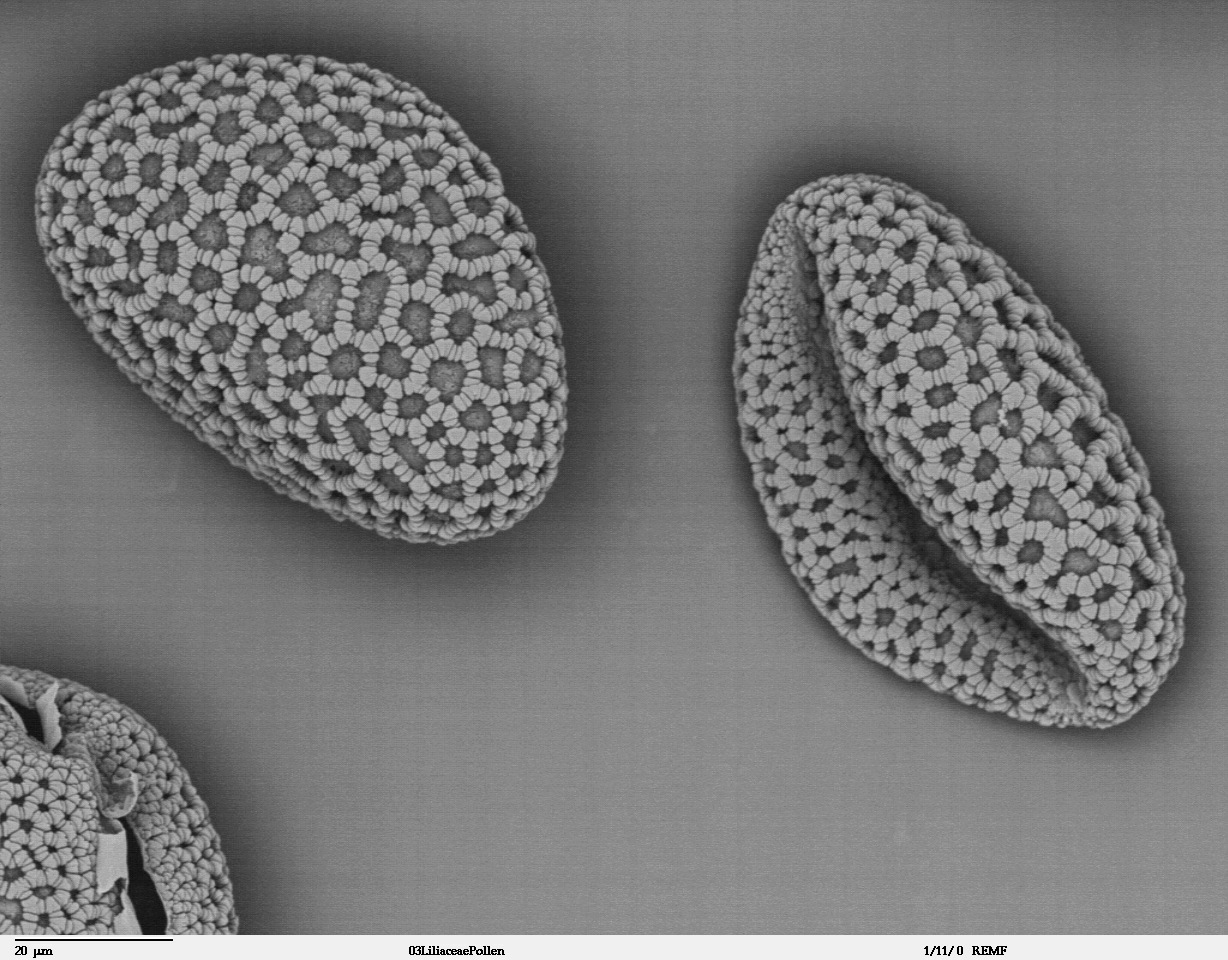
Lilium auratum var. auratum pollen

== Cultivation ==
This lily does well in plain or acidic soil; rich or fertilised soil will kill the plant. Bulbs should be planted in a hole three times their size in both depth and width in a well-drained area. The best position for this plant is one where its top will receive sunlight while its base remains shaded.

This lily can be cultivated by seed, but for faster reproduction scaling is recommended. Its life span (around 3 or 4 years) is significantly less than that of its descendants, so reproducing this plant is important for gardeners.

== Chemistry ==
L. auratum contains phenolic glycerides such as 1,2-O-diferuloylglycerol, 1-O-feruloyl-2-O-p-coumaroylglycerol, 1-O-p-coumaroyl-2-O-feruloylglycerol, 1-O-feruloylglycerol, 1,3-O-diferuloylglycerol, 1-O-feruloyl-3-O-p-coumaroylglycerol and 1-O-p-coumaroylglycerol.

== Export history ==
The Englishman who was the earliest collector of lily bulbs in Japan was arguably young John Gould Veitch of Veitch Nurseries, and in 1862 he sent to England the golden rayed lily, L. auratum, which became touted as the "aristocrat of lilies". It was allegedly in 1867 that a man named John Joshua Jarmain operating from Yokohama became the first commercial exporter of Japanese lilies, though the species of lily is not clarified. The mint exporter Samuel Cocking of Yokohama also exported lilies from the early 1800s, presumably of the L. auratum species, which is the local prefectural flower of Kanagawa Prefecture. Isaac Bunting, another purveyor of plants offered L. auratum for sale, as seen in his 1885 catalog.

== Edibility ==
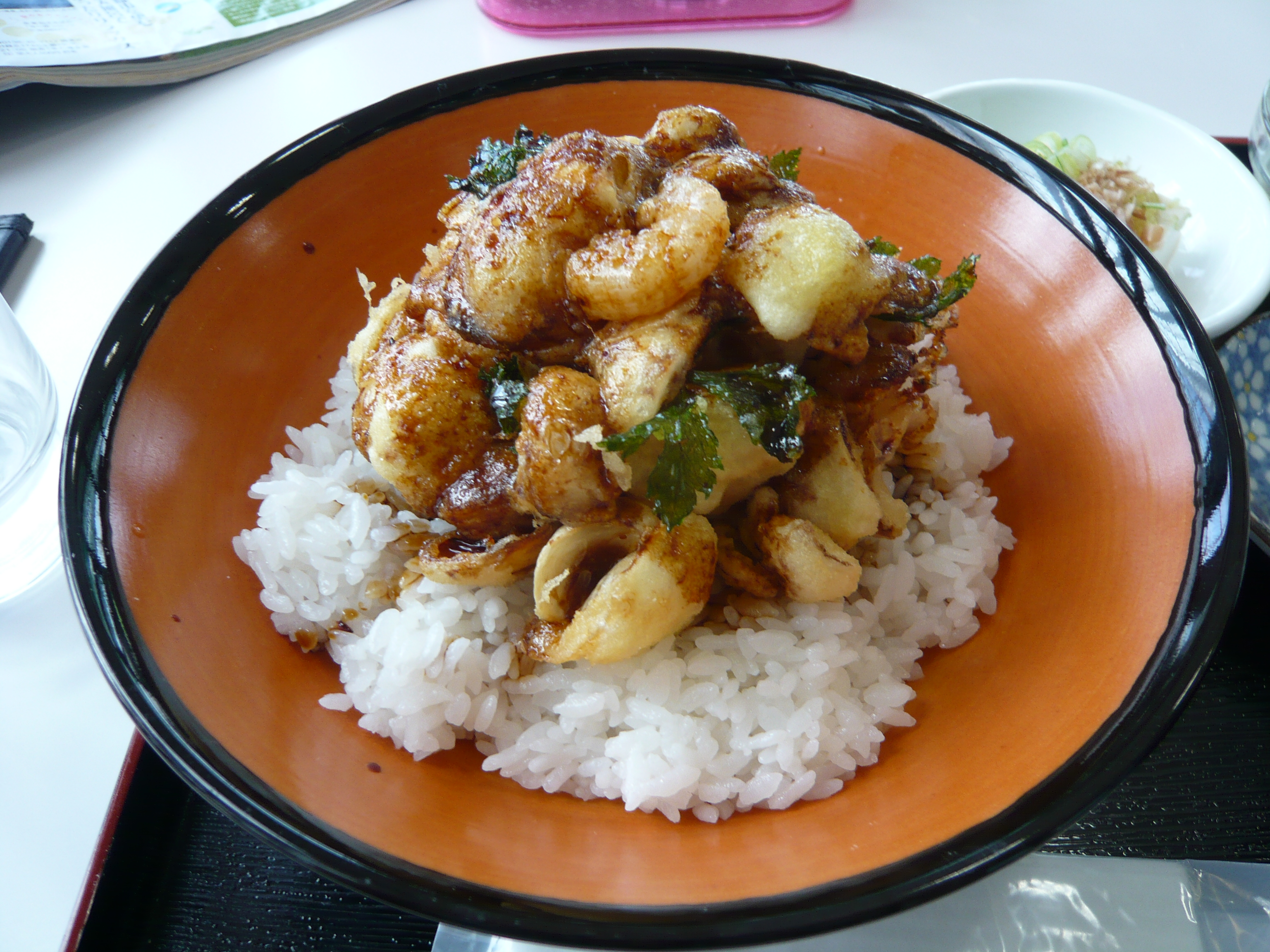
Japanese yurine-don, or rice with lily bulbs

L. auratum is one of several species traditionally eaten as lily bulb (yuri-ne) in Japan, usually saving the bulbs for eating until they have grown large. The bulb is still used as food, but while wild foraged L. auratum was formerly a major source entering the market, this has largely been displaced by farm-grown kooni-yuri or Lilium leichtlinii.

The bulbs are also eaten in Chinese cuisine.

== Toxicity ==
Any part of the Lilium species may exhibit toxicity to cats, but it is not noted among "lilies" of particular concern for felines according to a Japanese veterinary source. (Note: The five deadliest "lilies" are listed as :Lilium longiflorum, L. lancifolium, L. leichtlinii, Daylily (Hataya veterinary clinic))
