= Ruxin =

Ruxin is a surname. Notable people with the surname include:

- Josh Ruxin (born 1970), American businessman, academic, and writer
- Li Ruxin (born 1969), Chinese physicist
