= Rob Glaser =

American entrepreneur (born 1962)

- Born: Robert Denis Glaser; January 16, 1962 (age 64); New York City, New York, U.S.
- Education: Yale University (BS, MA)
- Occupations: business executive - founder and CEO of RealNetworks
- Spouse(s): Sarah Block (second marriage, m. 2000) Cori Durant (m. 2004)

Robert Denis Glaser (born January 16, 1962) is the founder of RealNetworks, which produces RealAudio, RealVideo, RealPlayer, and Helix, among other products and services. Before founding RealNetworks, he worked for Microsoft for ten years.

== Education and career ==
In 1983, Glaser graduated Yale University with an BS degree in Computer Science and an MA in economics.

In 1984, Glaser began work at Microsoft. In 1994, he founded Progressive Networks which became RealNetworks in 1997. Glaser served as CEO until 2010.

Since June 2010, Glaser has been a partner at global venture firm, Accel Partners, focusing on digital media technology, social media, and mobile service investments. He returned to RealNetworks again as interim CEO in 2012 and resumed the official title of CEO in 2014. In 2020 Glaser invested $10 million of his own money into the company to support its move into facial recognition technology.

== Other activities ==
On June 16, 2004, Glaser received the Music Visionary Award, along with EMI Vice Chairman David Munns, from the Music for Youth Foundation, and the United Jewish Appeal.

Glaser was the 22nd largest individual donor to 527 groups in the 2004 US election, donating over $2.2 million to pro-Democratic organizations. He was the leading creditor to Air America Radio, loaning at least $9.8 million according to its bankruptcy filing. In addition, along with economist Jeffrey Sachs and public health expert Josh Ruxin, Glaser founded the Access Project, an NGO dedicated to improving health care in Rwanda by increasing management capacity at health centers. In 1999, Glaser established the Glaser Progress Foundation, "to build a more just, sustainable and humane world". From 2011 to 2015, foundation assets have shrunk from $9 million to $5.7 million; annual grants have shrunk from $1.5 million to $267,000; overhead and expenses have grown slightly from $455,000 to $525,000. In 2016, he set up a web site (PutinTrump.org) to monitor and report then-candidate Donald Trump's connections to Vladimir Putin.
