= Enoshima Sea Candle =

Enoshima Sea Candle 江の島シーキャンドル
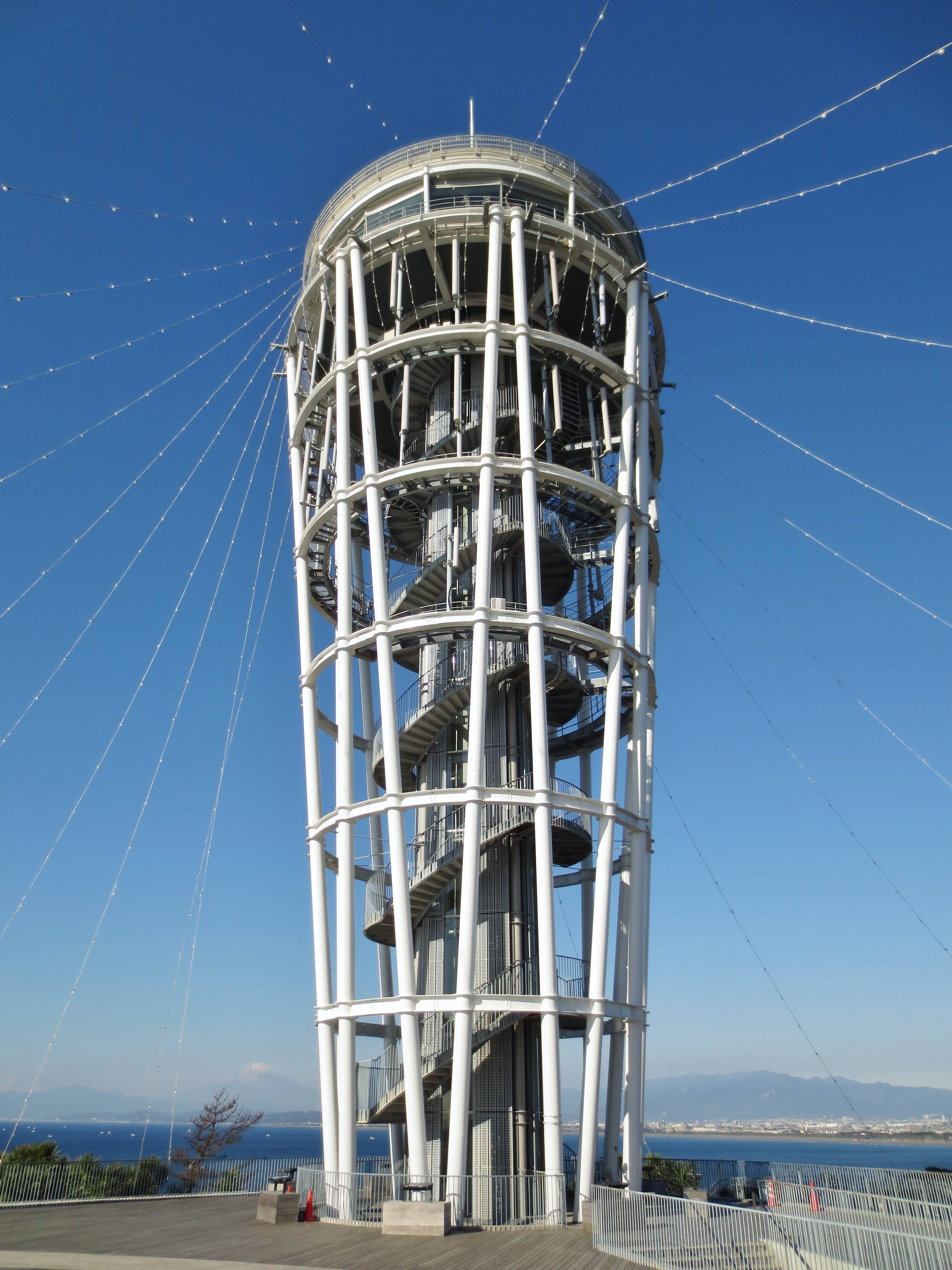
- Location: Enoshima, Samuel Cocking Garden, Fujisawa, Japan
- Coordinates: 35°17′59″N 139°28′42″E

Tower
- Constructed: 31 December 2002
- Built by: Shimizu Corporation
- Height: 60 m (200 ft)

Light
- Focal height: 107 m (351 ft)
- Intensity: 390,000 candela
- Range: 23 nmi (43 km; 26 mi)
- Characteristic: Fl W 10s
- Building details

General information
- Status: Tourist Attraction
- Location: 2 Chome-3-３番地２８ Enoshima, Fujisawa-shi, Kanagawa-ken 251-0036
- Completed: 31 December 2002

Height
- Observatory: 59.8m (119.6m above sea level)

The Enoshima Sea Candle (Japanese: 江の島シーキャンドル), also known as the Shonan Observatory Lighthouse, is an observation tower and lighthouse located in the Samuel Cocking Garden on the small tidal island of Enoshima in Fujisawa, Kanagawa, Japan. The tower has two observation decks, the primary indoor deck and a secondary outdoor deck. The primary deck can be accessed via a central lift or spiral staircase, while the outdoor deck can only be accessed by a second spiral staircase.

Completed in 2003, the Sea Candle was built to celebrate the 2002 centenary of the Enoshima Electric Railway. The Sea Candle was constructed next to the Enoshima lighthouse that was built in 1951. On New Year's Eve 2002, a ceremony took place to transfer the lighthouse duty, after which the old lighthouse was dismantled. The observation decks on the Sea Candle opened to the general public on 29 April 2003.

In 2004, the lighthouse was awarded a Good Design Award under the category Architecture and Environment Design – Environment Design.

== In popular culture ==
In the 2004 anime, Elfen Lied, the Enoshima Sea Candle is a key location for events of the series.

Netflix series Can This Love Be Translated? which follows the romance between interpreter Joo Ho-jin and actress Cha Mu-hee, was filmed in enoshima, using the backdrop of the tower.
