= Samuel Cocking Garden =

Botanical garden on the island of Enoshima in Japan

Coordinates: 35°17′59″N 139°28′42″E

The Samuel Cocking Garden (江の島サムエル・コッキング苑, Enoshima Samueru Kokkingu En), also known as the Enoshima Tropical Plants Garden, is a small botanical garden on the small island of Enoshima in Japan. The address is 2-3-28 Enoshima, Fujisawa, Kanagawa.

== History ==
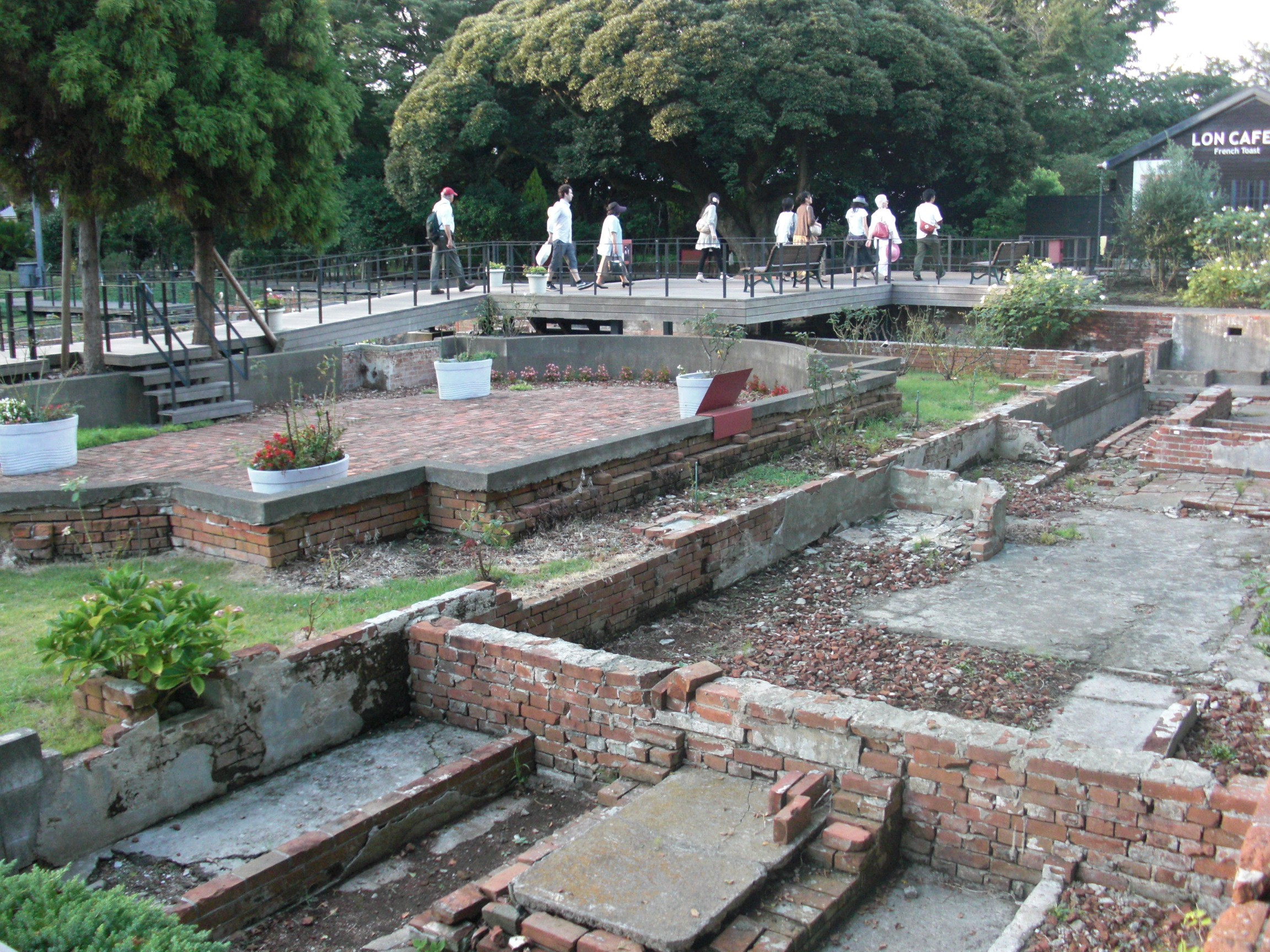
Samuel Cocking Garden

The garden was established in 1880 by British merchant Samuel Cocking (1842–1914) as the Enoshima Botanical Garden, and featured a greenhouse (660 m^{2}) in which he collected tropical plants.

This original greenhouse was destroyed in the 1923 Great Kantō earthquake. When in 1949 title passed to the city of Fujisawa, no trace of the greenhouse was found. However, in 2002, during reconstruction work, its brick foundation and original heating plant and boiler were discovered. In April 2003, a restored greenhouse was opened as part of the new garden, and as of 2004 had some 500,000 visitors per year.

== Layout ==
Garden features include camellia trees and the Enoshima Sea Candle, a large lookout tower (59.8 metres, about 200 feet. Mount Fuji can be seen from the top on a clear day.)

== See also ==
- List of botanical gardens in Japan

== References and external links ==
- BGCI entry
- Fujisawa City Tourist Information
