= Sing! Aiko =

Japanese music radio segment

"Sing! Aiko" (歌え！Aiko, Utae! Aiko) is a radio segment in Aiko's radio program Aiko's @llnightnippon.com, which aired from 1999 until 2003. When musical guests were invited to the program, Aiko would play the piano and cover the guests'—or others'—songs; sometimes, she sang her own songs with her guests. Rarely, Aiko would improvise a short song with a guest.

== Performed songs ==
Unless indicated, all songs are covered by Aiko.

=== 1999 ===
- Ami Suzuki (1999), "Our Days".
- SMAP (1999), "Fly".
- T.M.Revolution (1998), "Thunderbird".
- Porno Graffitti (1999), "Apollo" (アポロ).
- B'z (1992), "Itsuka no Merry Christmas" (A Christmas Day in Memories) in Friends.
- Original words by Josef Mohr, music by Franz Gruber (1818), "Silent Night", first performed in Austria. Sung the English version.
- Taiyō to Ciscomoon (1999), "Marui Taiyō" (丸い太陽, A Round Sun).
- "Santa Claus Is Coming to Town". Sung with Yuzu and Taiyō to Ciscomoon.

=== 2000 ===
- Yuzu (1999), "Itsuka" (いつか, Someday).
- Hana*hana (1999), "Ah, Yokatta" (あ～よかった, Ah, I Feel Fine). Sung with Hana*hana.
- Mr.Children (1996), "Hana" (花, Flowers).
- Masaharu Fukuyama (1999), "Squall".
- Yen Town Band (1996), "Swallowtail Butterfly".
- Spitz (1996), "Cherry" (チェリー).
- L'Arc-en-Ciel (1999), "Pieces".
- Yumi Matsutoya (1994), "Haru yo, Koi" (春よ、来い, Come on! Spring).
- Masayoshi Yamazaki (1997), "One More Time, One More Chance.
- Kinki Kids (2000), "Suki ni Natteku, Aishiteku (好きになってく 愛してく, More Like, More Love). Sung with Tsuyoshi Domoto.
- Kiroro (1999), "Suki na Hito" (好きな人, My Love). Sung with Kiroro.
- Iruka (1990), "Nagori Yuki" (なごり雪, Farewell Snow). Sung with Kiroro.
- Aiko's "Kabutomushi" (1999). Sung with Yuzu.
- Stevie Wonder (1996), "Isn't She Lovely?". Sung with Isa.
- SMAP (1998), "Yozora no Mukō" (夜空ノムコウ, Over the Night Sky). Sung with Yuka Kawamura.
- Akiko Kosaka (1988), "Anata" (あなた, You).
- Aiko & Spitz (2000). An impromptu song.
- Luna Sea (1998), "I for You". Sung with Luna Sea.
- The Love (1997), "Himawari Kanransha" (ひまわりの観覧車, A Sunflower-made Ferris Wheel). Sung with The Love.
- Aiko & Silva (2000), "Nuru Radio (ぬるラジオ, A Sloppy Radio Program). An impromptu song.
- Nana Kinomi and Hiroshi Itsuki (1991), "Izakaya" (居酒屋, Pub). Sung with Masaharu Fukuyama.
- SMAP (2000), "Lion Heart" (らいおんハート).

=== 2001 ===
- Aiko & Porno Graffiti (2001), "Yume no Onna" (夢の女ポルノ, Dream Girl). An impromptu song.
- Aiko & Tsuyoshi Domoto (2001), "Nijū Isseki no Yabo" (21世紀の野望, An Ambition in the 21st Century). An impromptu song.
- Yūzō Kayama (1988), "Kimi to Itsumademo" (君といつまでも, Forever With You). Sung with Fureai.
- Aiko & Gackt (2001), "Haru no Hagu, Chutchu" (春のハグチュッチュ, Hugging and Kissing During the Spring). An impromptu song.
- Carole King (1999), "So Far Away" in Tapestry. Sung with The Gospellers.
- Kirinji (2001), "Ame wa Mofu no Yō ni" (雨は毛布のように, Rain as a Blanket). Sung with Kirinji.
- Aiko & Chemistry (2001), "Aki no Hamokemi" (An Autumnal Harmony) with Chemistry. An impromptu song.
- Southern All Stars (1988), "Sha la la" (シャ・ラ・ラ). Sung with Yuzu.
- Aiko (2001), "Pikmin Single: Nurucom Version" (ピクミンジングル～ヌルコムバージョン). Parody of Strawberry Flower (2001), "Ai no Uta: Pikmin no Theme" (愛のうた～ピクミンのテーマ, Love Song: Theme of Pikmin).
- Sadistic Mika Band (1974), "Time Machine ni Onegai" (タイムマシンにおねがい, May I Ask a Favor, Time Machine).

=== 2002 ===
- Miyuki Nakajima (1988), "Jidai" (時代, Period). Sung with Kobukuro.
- Aiko & The Brilliant Green (2002), "Asoko no Dontsuki" (あそこのどんつき, At the End of the Street Over There). An impromptu song.
- Kome Kome Club (1992), "Kimi ga Iru Dake-de (君がいるだけで, Only Stays With You). Sung with Reo Tsuchiya.
- Every Little Thing (2001), "Fragile". Sung with Kaori Mochida.

=== 2003 ===
- Shikao Suga (2001), "Saka no Tochū" (坂の途中, On My Way to the Top of the Slope) in Sugarless. Sung with Shikao Suga.
