= Health Builders =

Rwanda based non profit organisation

- Founded: 2007
- Founders: Josh Ruxin
- Type: Non-Profit
- Purpose: Health systems strengthening
- Region served: Rwanda
- Key people: Nancy Reynolds (Chair of Board) Michel Musilikare (Executive Director)
- Website: www.healthbuilders.org

Health Builders is a Rwanda-based non-profit organization that uses systems-level interventions and infrastructure development to enable comprehensive primary health care for communities that need it.

Health Builders believes that the best way to improve health care is to address the structural challenges that prevent it from operating efficiently. Its goal is to provide health facilities with the management frameworks, strong infrastructure and basic resources to operate efficiently and become sustainable.

Health Builders works with an exit strategy in mind. It helps communities to build their own health systems, providing the knowledge, materials and technical assistance to provide primary care. In doing so, Health Builders aims to not only ensure locally managed health care, but also give local communities an opportunity to prosper.

== History ==
Health Builders' work began in 2007 by Josh Ruxin and was originally under the name Rwanda Works before changing it to Health Builders in 2013. The organization was created on the premise that by applying efficiency-focused business principles to health problems, resources could be maximized, people would be healthier, and poor economies would begin to thrive.

Since its inception, Health Builders has partnered with the Government of Rwanda and other local partners to improve Rwanda's public health system through hands-on technical assistance, supportive supervision, and management training to public health facilities in need.

In 2008, Health Builders expanded its services to include infrastructural development and technological implementation. Health Builders saw how many public health facilities needed basic facilities like stable walls and roofs, sources of clean water or reliable electricity. It considered these resources critical to health centers' success and, in response, began to provide them alongside its management services.

Today, Health Builders through its partners has fortified primary care services for 1 million people across Rwanda and provided health care access to 186,000 people formerly without it.

== Work ==
Health Builders’ interventions are divided into three categories: Management, Infrastructure and Technology.

=== Management ===
Health Builders’ management work is designed to address the specific constraints faced by each health facility (e.g., limited power supply, staff with limited education and experience, inadequate infrastructure). In partnership with health center staff and local communities, Health Builders develops and implements management models that fit the facility’s needs and overcome specific operational challenges. Once the systems are fully functional, Health Builders withdraws, providing only monthly or quarterly assessments of the programs, and support upon request.

Its six key domains of management intervention include:

- Human Resources & Planning
- Pharmacy Logistics
- Infrastructure
- Data Management & IT Systems
- Financial Management
- Quality of Clinical Management

=== Infrastructure ===
By developing infrastructure, Health Builders seeks to ensure that every community has access to a safe and permanent local health facility that offers a full range of services, including HIV prevention and treatment programs, tuberculosis treatment, family planning, and maternal and child health care. Health Builders fills infrastructure gaps by initiating and overseeing the construction of modern health centers where they do not exist, or where existing facilities are not functional. Once constructed, ownership of the new facility is given to the national government to ensure sustainability.

To date, Health Builders has built six health centers, two maternity wards, and provided solar power to facilities that remain off the grid. A seventh health center is currently under construction in Rubavu district in the Western province.

Each new health center serves a catchment population of approximately 25,000 people, though thousands more travel by foot, bike, and bus from other districts to seek the health care those facilities offer.

=== Technology ===
By implementing basic technologies in three key categories, Health Builders has improved care delivery and health outcomes for multiple resource-limited communities.

==== Maternal and Child Health ====
Many countries continue to struggle with maternal and neonatal mortality, malnutrition, and stunting. Health Builders worked in collaboration with the Rwandan Ministry of Health, UNICEF, and the GE Foundation, to implement RapidSMS ‒ a tool that uses mobile text messaging to track health metrics among pregnant women and children under the age of two ‒ in Rwanda. Health Builders also seeks to improve maternal and child health through its management interventions, targeted approaches to the referral system, and the use of case-based training for healthcare providers.

==== Safe Water ====
Health Builders partners with the Center for Global Safe Water at Emory University and the GE Foundation to provide health facilities with high-volume water purification systems. As a result, those facilities can produce purified water for themselves and their surrounding communities. Health Builders currently works with clean water projects in 10 health centers located in the Bugesera and Musanze districts of Rwanda.

==== Oxygen ====
Oxygen is a WHO essential drug, noted for reducing infant mortality due to asphyxia, among other life-threatening conditions.

Health Builders has partnered with the GE Foundation and the Government of Rwanda to install a large-scale oxygen plant at one district hospital in Rwanda, complete with a distribution system that would allow the hospital to sell oxygen to surrounding facilities at affordable prices.

== See also ==
- Rwanda
- Government of Rwanda
