= Sakura no Ki no Shita =

Studio album by Aiko
- Released: March 1, 2000
- Studios: Hitokuchizaka Studio; Free Studio Yotsuya; Great Studio Yokohama
- Genre: J-Pop
- Length: 52:38
- Label: Pony Canyon
- Producers: aiko, Yukio Hiasa, Masanori Shimada

Aiko chronology
Chiisana Marui Kojitsu (1999)	Sakura no Ki no Shita (2000)	Natsufuku (2001)

Singles from Sakura no Ki no Shita
- 1. "Hanabi" Released: August 4, 1999; 2. "Kabutomushi" Released: November 17, 1999; 3. "Sakura no Toki" Released: February 17, 2000

Sakura no Ki no Shita (桜の木の下) is the second studio album by Japanese singer Aiko, released on March 1, 2000. It reached #1 on Oricon and remained on the charts for 69 weeks. It's composition is a fusion of jazz, rock and j-pop.

== Singles ==
Three singles were released from the Album, "Hanabi", released on August 4, 1999, would peak at number 10 and remain for 20 weeks. It would be used as the ending theme for the TV Asahi series, "Geki Maji!! Teen no Honne".

"Kabutomushi", released on November 17, 1999, reached number 8 and stayed for 15 weeks. It was used as the outro for Fuji TV variety program, "Jobireba?"

It's final single, "Sakura no Toki", released on February 17, 2000, reached number 12 and remained for 8 weeks.

== Release and promotion ==
"Sakura no Ki no Shita" was a commercial success, reaching at number one on the charts and being certified triple platinum by the RIAJ. It won at the 2001 Japan Gold Disc Award for "Rock Album of the Year".

Aiko would perform at the 51st NHK Kohaku Uta Gassen, where she sung "Boyfriend", it would also mark her first performance on the show.

== Track listing ==
All tracks are written by aiko, arranged by Masanori Shimada.

CD
No.	Title	Length
1.	"Ai no Yamai (愛の病, Lovesickness)"	4:17
2.	"Hanabi (花火, Fireworks)"	4:38
3.	"Sakura no Toki (桜の時, Cherry Blossoms Season)"	4:24
4.	"Okusuri (お薬, Medicine For Brokenhearted)"	5:47
5.	"Futari no Katachi (二人の形, Lovers Form)"	5:48
6.	"Momoiro (桃色, Pink Heart)"	4:37
7.	"Waruguchi (悪口, Say Bad Thing About Him)"	3:54
8.	"Kizuato (傷跡, Scar)"	4:04
9.	"Power of Love"	5:00
10.	"Kabutomushi (カブトムシ, Beetle)"	5:10
11.	"Ren'ai Junkie (恋愛ジャンキー, Love Junkie)" (bonus track)

== Charts ==
Chart performance for Sakura no Ki no Shita
Chart (2009)	Peak position
Japanese Albums (Oricon)	2

Year-end chart performance for Sakura no Ki no Shita
Chart (2009)	Position
Japanese Albums (Oricon)	10

== Certifications ==
Certifications and sales for Hocus Pocus
Region	Certification	Certified units/sales
Japan (RIAJ)	3x Platinum	1,200,000

== Release history ==
Date	Edition(s)	Formats	Label	Ref.
March 1, 2000	Standard	CD	Pony Canyon	
May 25, 2012	Standard	Digital Download	Pony Canyon	

== Personnel ==
Taken from CD Booklet:

- aiko: Vocals (All Tracks)
- Masanori Shimada: Piano (#1-6, 8, 10, 11), Hammond (#1, 2, 3, 5, 8, 9), Guitars (#3, 6), Wurlitzer (#7), Programming (#1, 2, 4, 5, 6, 9, 10, 11)
- Tomoyasu Kawamura: Drums (#1)
- Sting Miyamoto: Bass (#1, 3, 4, 5, 9)
- Yoshiaki Kano: Guitars (#1, 2, 5, 6, 9, 10, 11)
- Tomohiro Yahiro: Percussion (#1, 3, 4, 8)
- Takahiko Obata: Drums (#2, 11)
- Kenji Sato: Bass (#2, 11)
- Yasuo Sano: Drums (#3, 4, 8)
- Susumu Nagata: Guitars (#3, 4)
- Toshiya Matsunaga: Drums (#5, 6, 9, 10)
- Takemi Kosaka & Hideaki Nakaji: Trombone (#5, 9)
- Kayoko Kimura and Kazuhiko Kondo: Tenor Sax (#5, 9)
- Kiyofumi Onoda: Bass (#6)
- Yuki Komazawa: Pedal Steel Guitar (#7)
- Masayoshi Furukawa: Acoustic Guitar (#7)
- Bakabon Suzuki: Wood Bass (#8)
- Masahiro Ogura: Acoustic Guitar (#8)
- Tatsuya Shimojimi & Mikio Saito: Trumpet (#9)
- The Hand Clappers (gumby, The Man Who Makes Wishes, Tara, The Devoted Husband, Dancer): Hand Claps (#9)
- Kenji Ueda: Bass (#10)
