= Access Project =

The Access Project
- Founded: 2002
- Type: Public Health Non-profit
- Location: Kigali, Rwanda
- Region served: Rwanda
- Key people: Josh Ruxin, Jeffrey Sachs
- Website: www.theaccessproject.com

The Access Project is a non-profit organization dedicated to increasing the quality and accessibility of health care in Rwanda. Founded in 2002 by public health expert Josh Ruxin and economist Jeffrey Sachs, the organization provides technical and operational assistance to improve the management capacity of rural health centers, with a focus on maternal and child health.

Columbia University's Earth Institute initiative also builds new health centers in partnership with the Rwanda Ministry of Health (MOH) and led the country's first neglected tropical diseases (NTD) control program.

== Approach ==
The Access Project's approach is to apply private sector principles to the management of health centers across Rwanda. Through hands-on trainings and support, the organization seeks to make health centers efficient, accountable, and self-sustaining. Interventions focus on eight "management domains," from planning and coordination to drug procurement and financial management. In places where infrastructure does not exist or is beyond repair, Access works with the MOH to build new health centers. Together with the MOH, Access has built six health centers in Gashora, Gataraga, Kintobo, Juru, Ngeruka, and Nyarugenge.

== Funders ==
Seed funded by Rob Glaser, the CEO of Real Networks and a former Microsoft executive, and his Glaser Progress Foundation, the Access Project has also received funding from the GE Foundation, the MAC AIDS Fund, and the Schmidt Family Foundation. In addition, Access has been funded by Pfizer, the MAIA Foundation, the Legatum Foundation, and the Garth Brooks Teammates for Kids Foundation.
