= Samuel Cocking =

British businessman

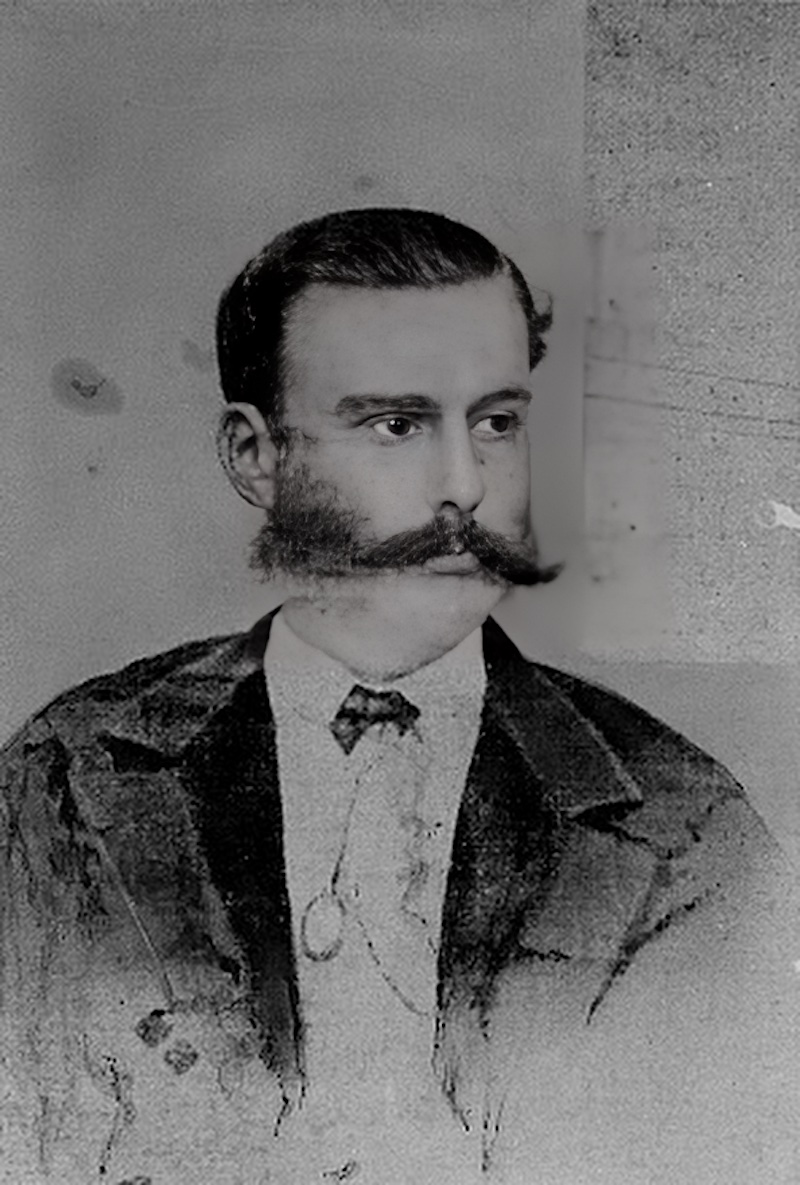
Samuel Cocking.

Samuel Cocking (19 March 1845 in Camberwell London – 26 February 1914 in Yokohama, Japan) was a merchant in Yokohama arriving in 1869, shortly after the “Opening of Japan”. Although he was born in Ireland, he moved with his parents to Australia at a young age and grew up mostly in Melbourne. In Japan he is known for the large greenhouse (660 m^{2} (7,100 sq ft)) and gardens that he developed in Enoshima that bears his name.

He married Miyata Riki in 1872. Although Cocking and Miyata Riki did not have any children of their own, they adopted Miyata Riki's niece after her mother died at a young age. Cocking is buried in the Miyata family plot in a Buddhist cemetery in Yokohama, which was unusual for foreigners living in Japan at that time. Most foreigners (including Cocking's younger sister Florence who died shortly after joining her brother in Japan) were interred at the foreigners cemetery in Yokohama.

His company, “Cocking & Co” specialized in trading Japanese curios, art and antiques as well as importing chemicals, drugs, scientific and laboratory apparatus. He imported carbolic acid (phenol) which was used as a disinfectant, particularly against cholera. It is noted during one cholera outbreak he distributed his stock of carbolic acid free of charge. He exported peppermint oil – refined from peppermint grown in Yamagata prefecture. He is credited for introducing soap, bicycles, the electric lightbulb to Japan. He was also heavily involved in the fledgling photographic industry in Japan, importing photographic materials and chemicals and organizing the first photographic society in Japan. He also helped the foundation of Konishi Honten, a photographic store that would become Konica.

In 1880, he purchased (in his wife's name) the highlands, including derelict Buddhist shrines, on the island of Enoshima and began building the botanical gardens and a villa. The State Shinto 'Abolish the Buddha. Destroy Sakyamuni' policy Haibutsu kishaku (廃仏毀釈) of the new Meiji government had made the land available.

It was during the years of anti-Buddhist sentiment in Japan that Cocking was heavily involved in the Japanese curios trade. One famous incident involved Cocking being offered the Kamakura Daibutsu for 'a song'. He refused to buy the Daibutsu – no doubt feeling it had too much cultural importance to Japan and should remain in the country.

In 1887, he added a power plant (which was later the origin of the Yokohama Cooperative Electric Light Company). His garden is now operated by the city of Fujisawa as the Samuel Cocking Garden renamed after remains of Cocking's greenhouse were rediscovered during renovation work on the lighthouse and gardens.
