= Enoshima =

Offshore island of Fujisawa, Japan

Native name: 江の島
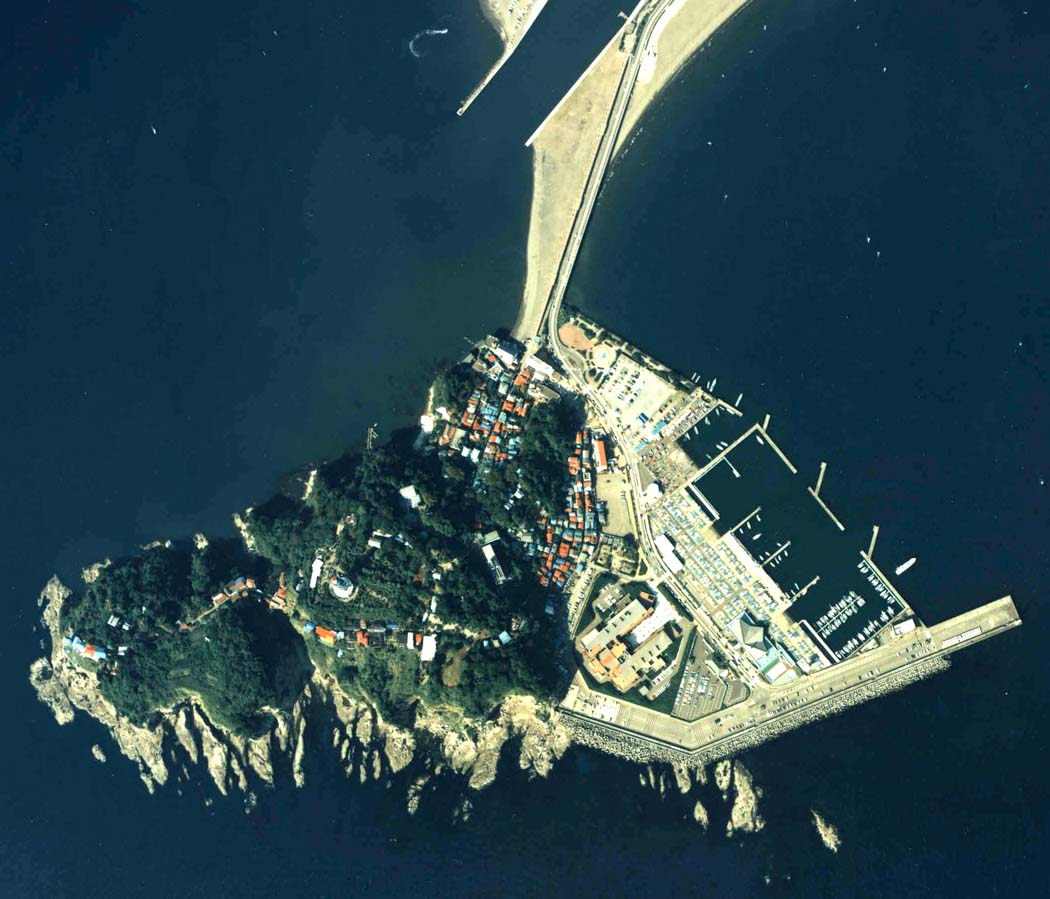
- A 1988 aerial image of Enoshima
- Interactive map of Enoshima

Geography
- Coordinates: 35°17′59″N 139°28′49″E
- Archipelago: Japanese archipelago

Administration
- Japan

Demographics
- Ethnic groups: Japanese

Additional information
- Time zone: Japan Standard Time (UTC+9)

Enoshima (Japanese: 江の島) is a small offshore island, about 4 km (2.5 mi) in circumference, at the mouth of the Katase River which flows into the Sagami Bay of Kanagawa Prefecture, Japan. Administratively, Enoshima is part of the mainland city of Fujisawa, and is linked to the Katase section of that city by a 389-metre-long (1,276 ft) bridge. Home to some of the closest sandy beaches to Tokyo and Yokohama, the island and adjacent coastline are the hub of a local resort area.

== History ==
=== Classical era ===
Benzaiten, the goddess of music and entertainment, is enshrined on the island. The island in its entirety is dedicated to the goddess, who is said to have caused it to rise from the bottom of the sea in the sixth century. The island is the scene of the Enoshima Engi, a history of shrines on Enoshima written by the Japanese Buddhist monk Kōkei in 1047 AD.

=== Modern era ===
In 1880, after the Shinto and Buddhism separation order of the new Meiji government had made the land available, much of the uplands was purchased by Samuel Cocking, a British merchant, in his Japanese wife's name. He developed a power plant and extensive botanical gardens including a very large greenhouse. Although the original greenhouse was destroyed in the 1923 Great Kantō earthquake, the botanical garden (now the Samuel Cocking Garden) remains an attraction with over half a million visitors a year.

Gallery

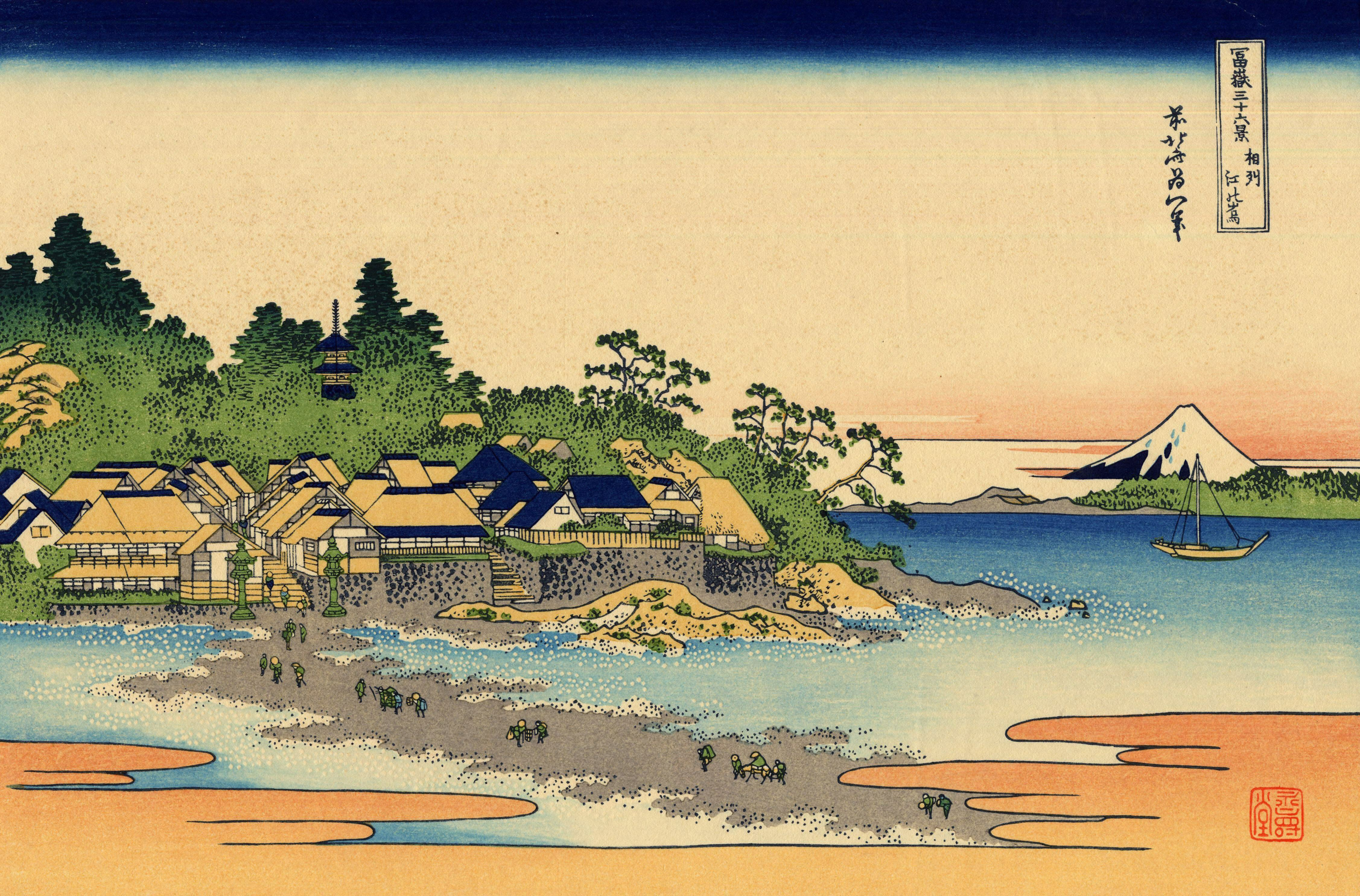
"Enoshima in the Sagami Province" by Hokusai (part of the series Thirty-six Views of Mount Fuji), circa 1830

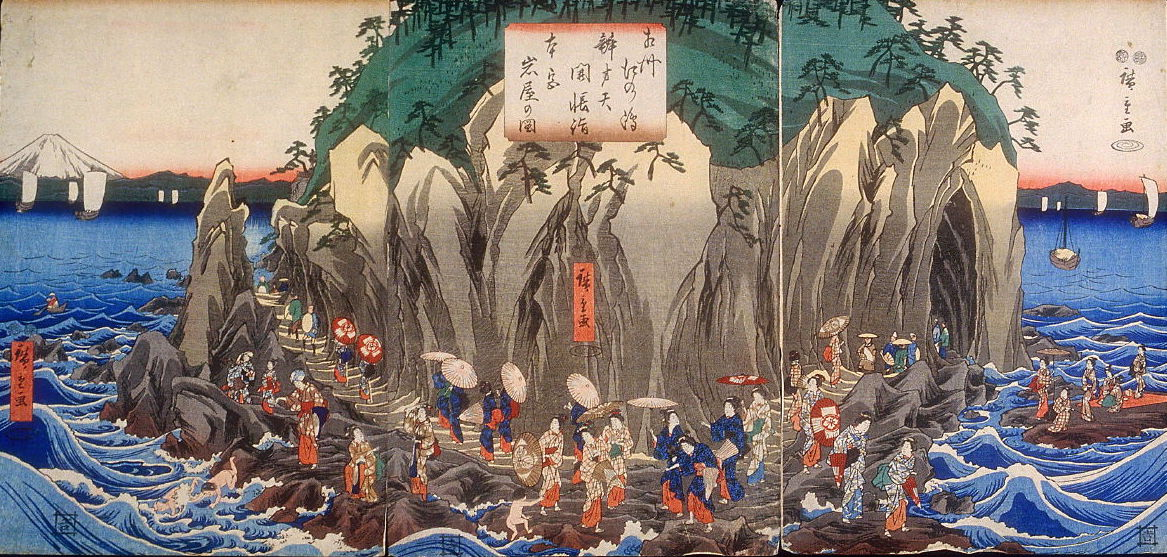
Pilgrimage to the Cave Shrine of Benzaiten by Hiroshige Ando (c. 1850)

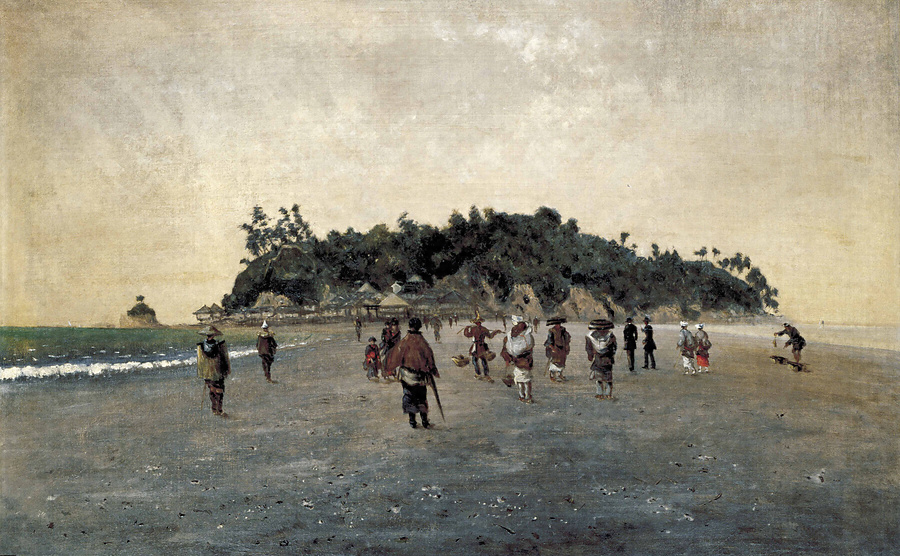
Enoshima by Yuichi Takahashi. Between 1876 and 77.

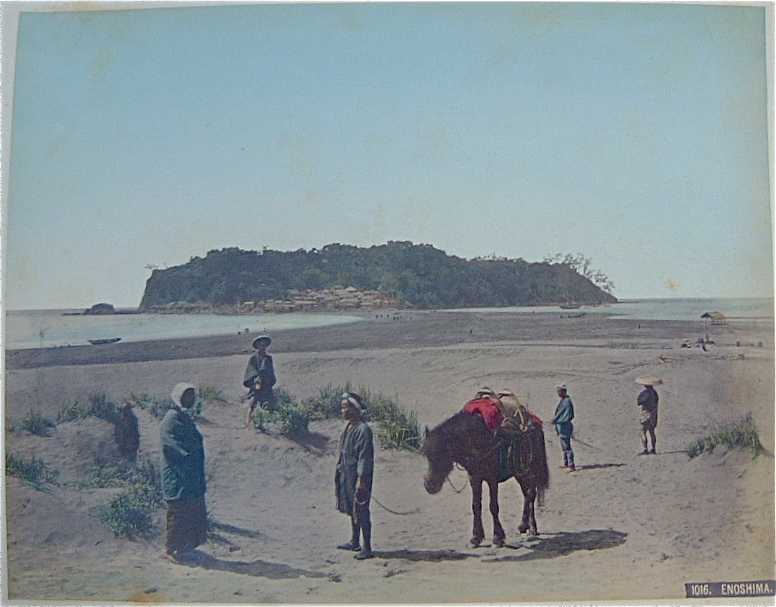
Photograph by Kimbei Kusakabe. 1890s.

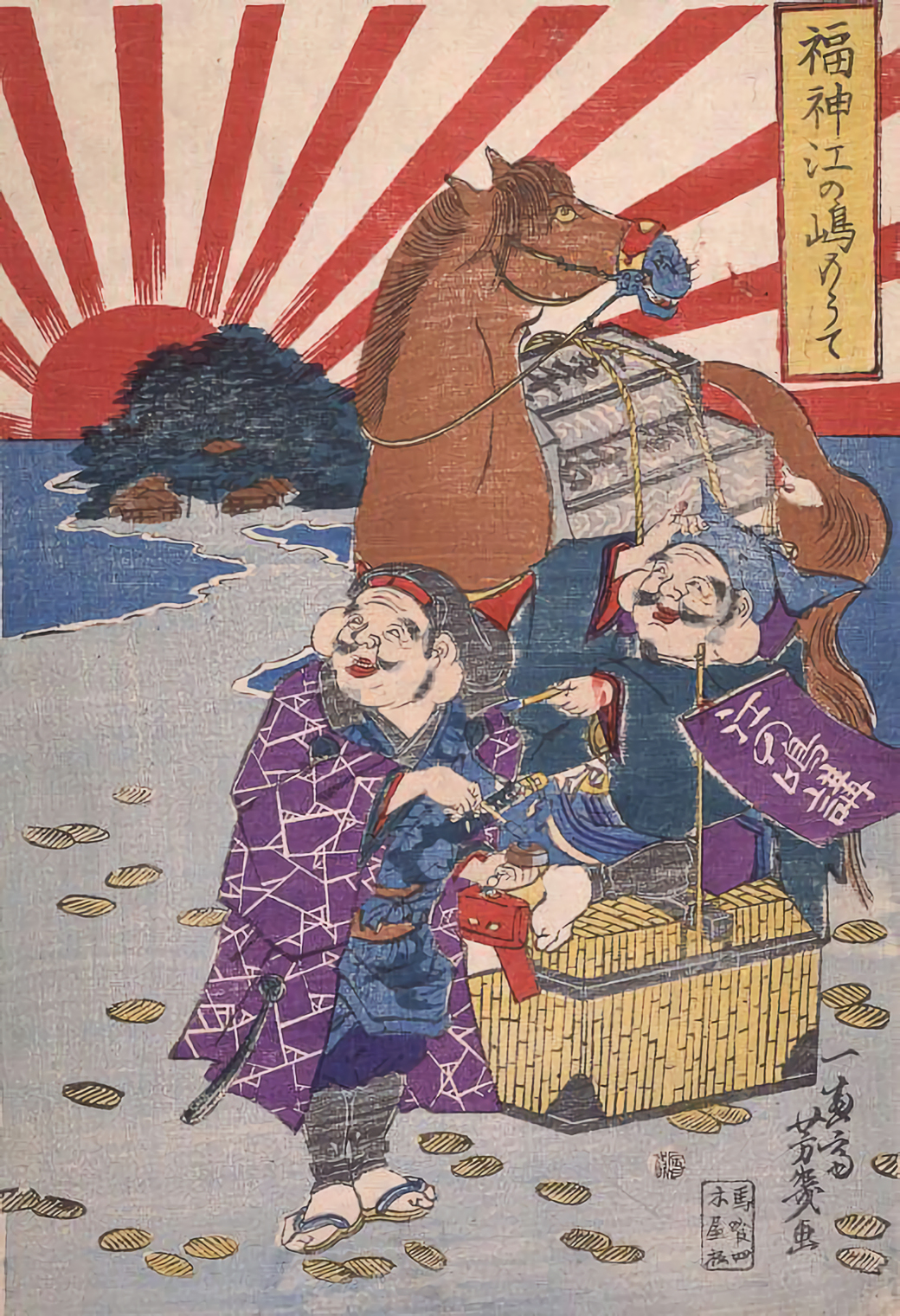
Lucky Gods' visit to Enoshima (1869)

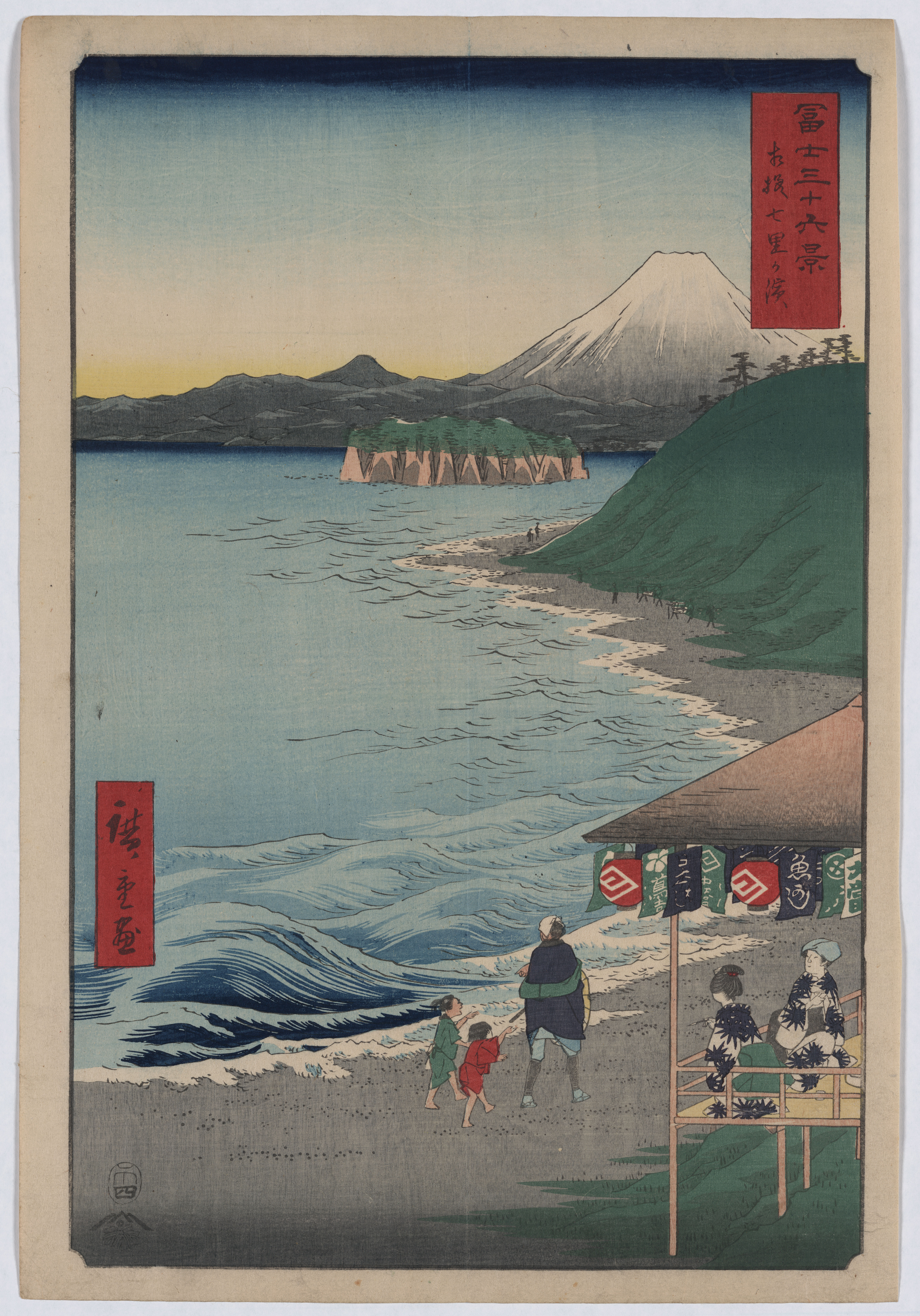
The Seven Ri Beach

=== Contemporary era ===
Enoshima is now the center of Shōnan, a resort area along the coast of Sagami Bay.

== Food ==
- Various forms of rice cracker, including those of octopus ("Maruyaki Tako Senbei"), shrimp, and whitebait at Asahi Honten

== Transportation ==
Enoshima is served by three nearby railway stations: Katase-Enoshima Terminus on the Odakyū Enoshima Line, Enoshima Station on the Enoshima Electric Railway ("Enoden"), and Shōnan-Enoshima Station on the Shonan Monorail.

== Features ==
- Enoshima Illuminations - A large-scale light show that runs from December through the end of February. The show is free, but admission to the Samuel Cocking Garden is required.
- Enoshima Sea Candle - located within the Samuel Cocking Garden.
- Enoshima Shrine
- Iwaya Caves - were formed by the erosion of waves in ancient times. It has also been a place for Buddhist monks to train. The Iwaya caves consists of the First Cave (153 m (502 ft) in length) and the Second Cave (56 m (184 ft) in length). These caves can be entered by purchasing a ticket.
- Lover's Hill/Bell of Ryuren - A romantic place where lovers post messages with padlocks, a mini-version of the love locks in Paris.
- Luminous Way - A set of three illuminated escalators which take visitors from the base of the Enoshima Shrine to the Samuel Cocking Garden, bypassing a series of long and steep stairways. Fees required.
- Samuel Cocking Garden - located at the island's summit.
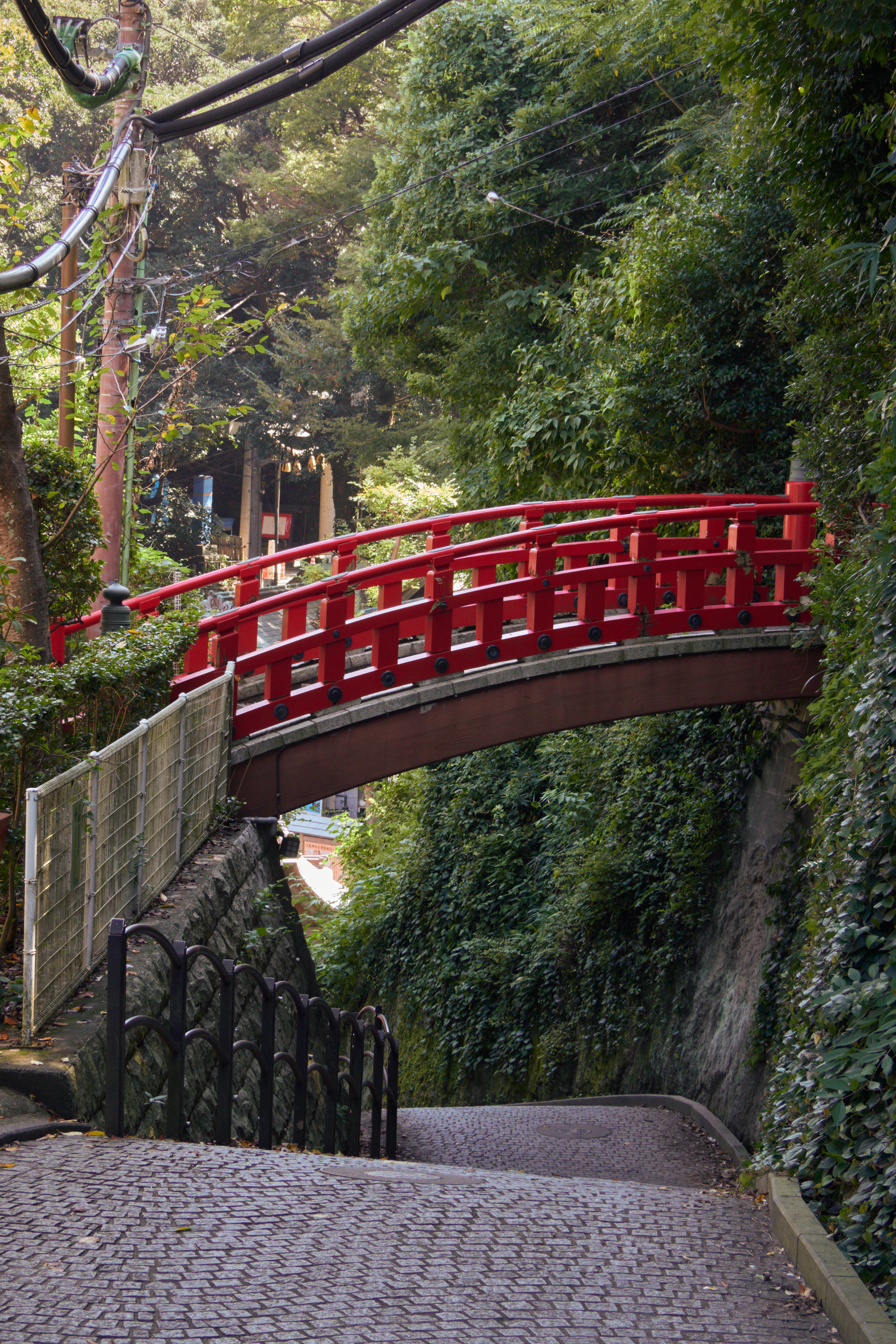
A red arched bridge over a ravine at Enoshima.

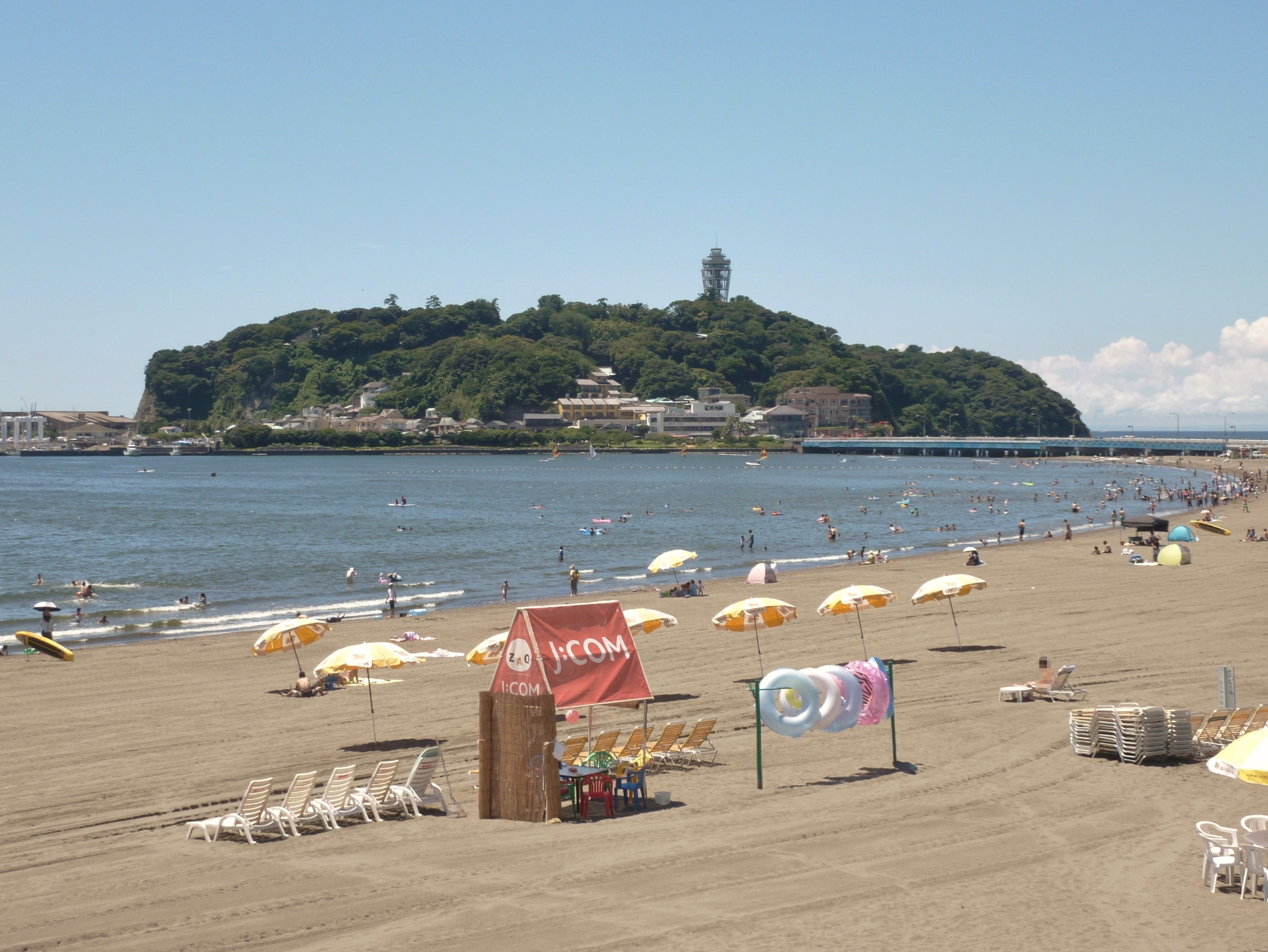
Enoshima

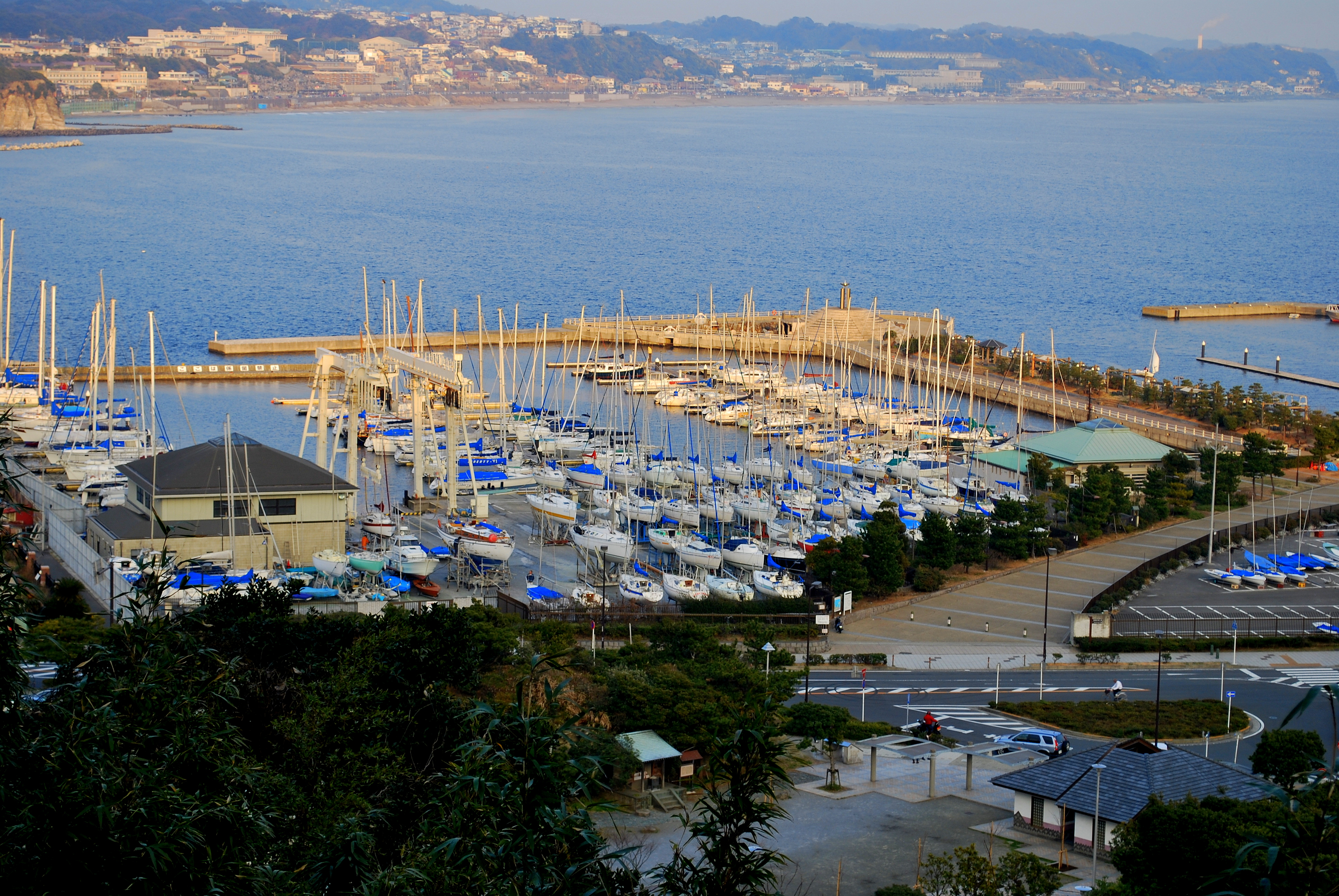
Enoshima yacht harbor

Various scenes of the island, 2022

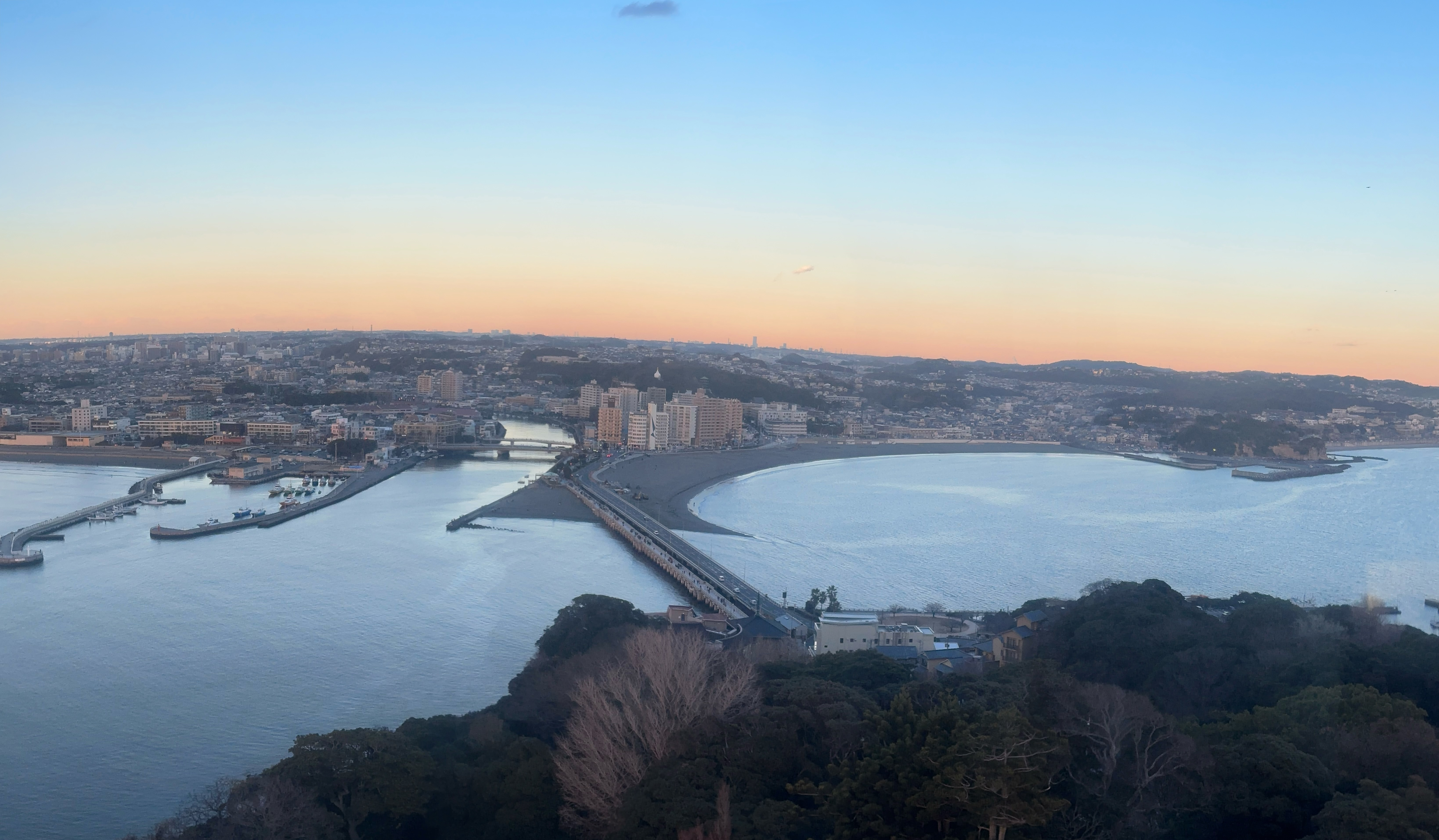
Looking towards Fujisawa from Enoshima Sea Candle

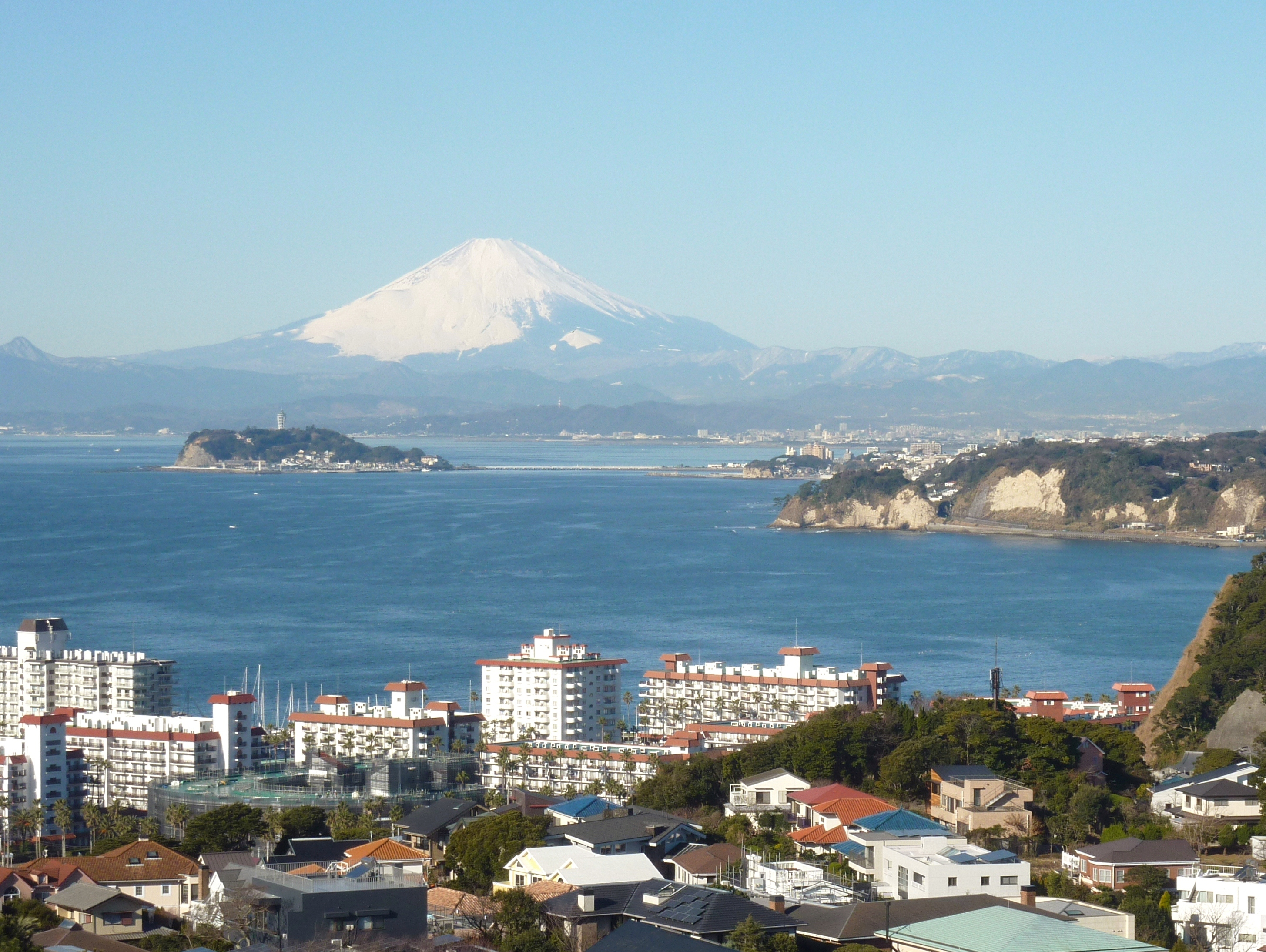
Viewed from Miura Peninsula.

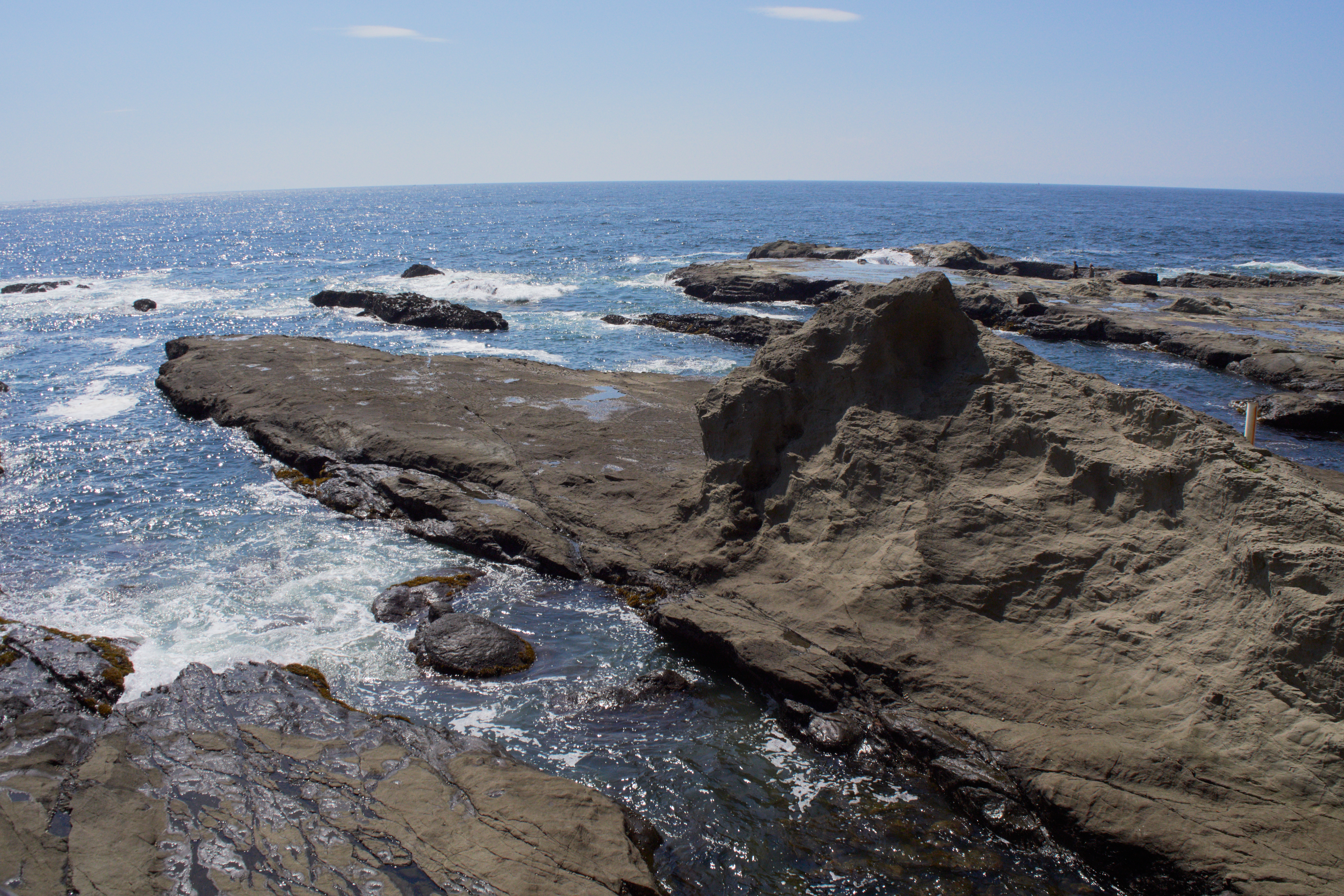
Rocky coastline at Enoshima.

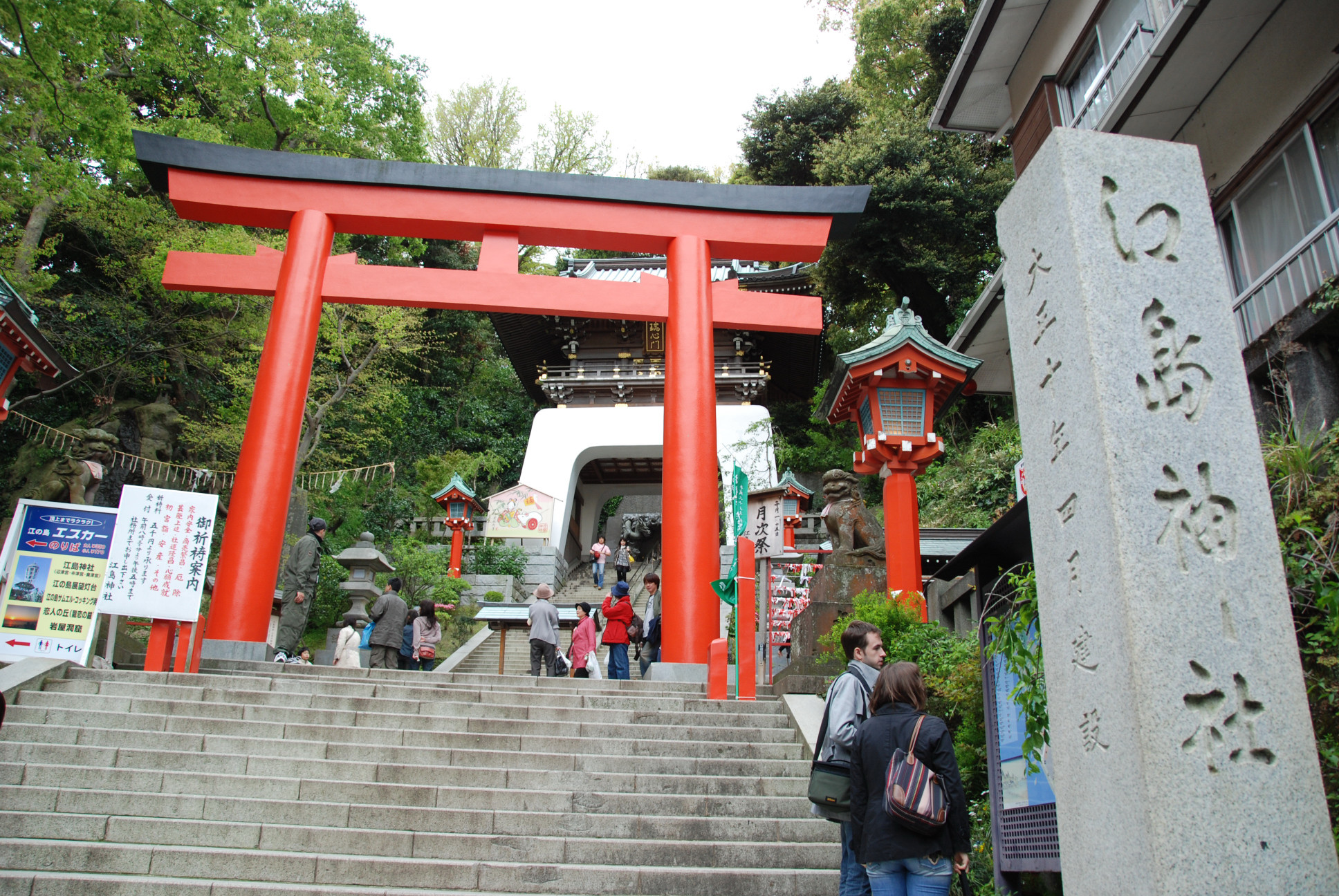
Enoshima Shrine

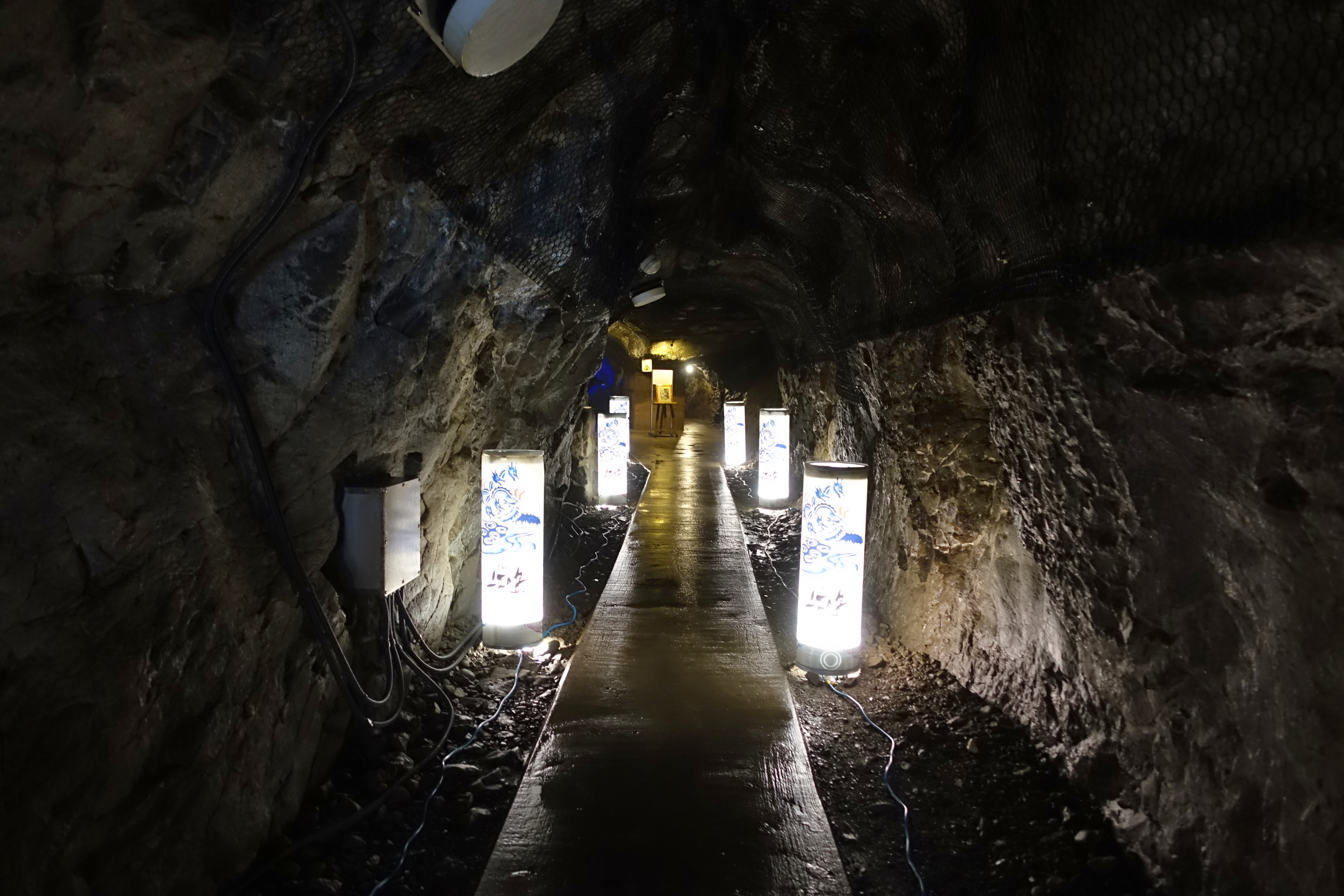
Iwaya Caves

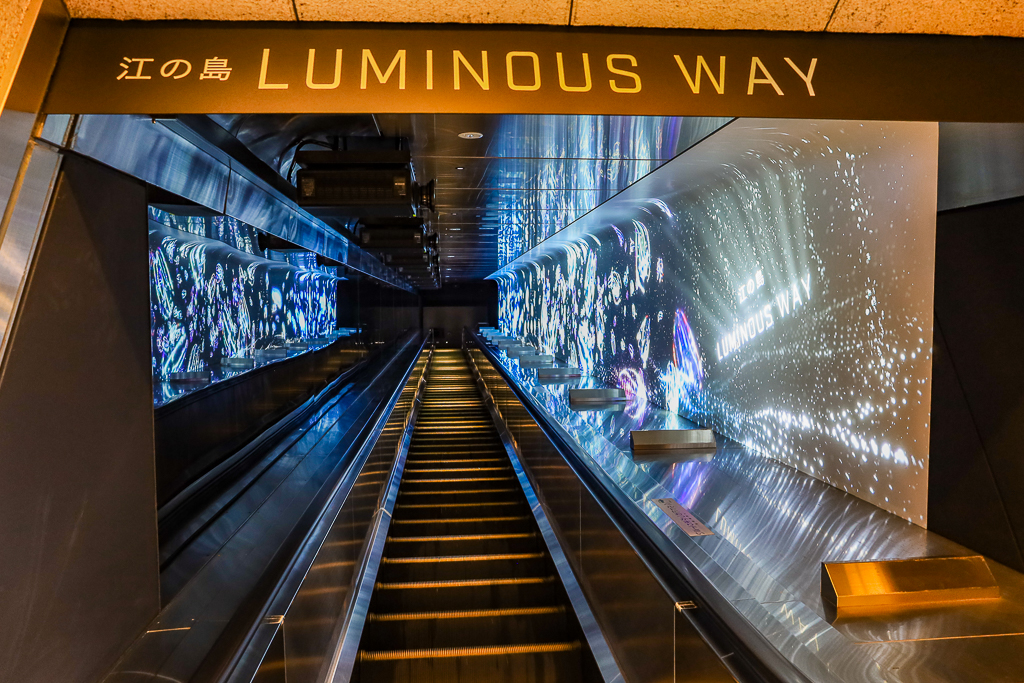
Luminous Way - The first of a set of 3 escalators

== Sport ==
Enoshima was the Olympic harbor for the 1964 Summer Olympics. Enoshima was also used as the sailing venue for the 2020 Summer Olympics.

== Accessibility ==
While the bridge and town area of Enoshima are wheelchair accessible, anything past the main gate of the shrine (including the observation tower, caves, etc.) is inaccessible to those with mobility difficulties.
