= Josh Ruxin =

American businessman

Josh Ruxin (born June 15, 1970) is an American businessman, academic, and writer. As a businessman, he is co-founder and Executive Chairman of GoodLife Pharmacy, an East Africa–based pharmaceuticals chain in Kenya and Uganda, founder of the Rwandan Health Builders non-profit, and owner of Heaven Restaurant & Boutique Hotel, also in Rwanda.

He was the Truman Scholar for Connecticut, 1990; a Fulbright scholar to Bolivia in 1992; and a Marshall Scholar in 1994. Formerly, Ruxin was on faculty as an assistant clinical professor of public health at the Mailman School of Public Health at Columbia University.

He is the author of A Thousand Hills to Heaven: Love, Hope, and a Restaurant in Rwanda which the New York Times describes as "an absorbing and affecting narrative, documenting both victories and setbacks."

== Personal life ==
Ruxin was born on June 15, 1970, in Cleveland, Ohio. He has lived in East Africa with his wife and three children. In 2008, Ruxin and his wife Alissa opened Heaven Restaurant & Boutique Hotel in the Kiyovu neighborhood of Kigali.

== Professional background ==
In 2013, Ruxin founded Goodlife Pharmacy, an East Africa based pharmaceuticals chain with over 30 stores in Kenya and Uganda. He currently serves as the Executive Chairman of Goodlife. The company provides pharmaceuticals to customers across the region from convenient locations – with a total reach of 1.2 million people. It has plans to expand to more than 100 locations in the East African region.

Ruxin founded Health Builders, an international health NGO that applies business principles to health problems by providing technical management assistance to rural health centers in Rwanda, and served as the organization's director until 2015. He also directed The Access Project, founded the Neglected Tropical Disease Control Project, and founded and directed the Millennium Villages Project in Rwanda.

Ruxin was on faculty as an assistant clinical professor of public health at the Mailman School of Public Health at Columbia University. In 1999, he co-founded and served as a vice president of OTF Group, Inc, a strategy consulting firm. He was also the Truman Scholar for Connecticut, 1990; a Fulbright Scholar to Bolivia in 1992; and a Marshall Scholar in 1994.

He also serves on the board of directors of FilmAid International and Generation Rwanda and is a faculty member at the Clergy Leadership Project. Ruxin serves on the board of www.kepler.org.

== Published works ==
- Ruxin, Josh. A Thousand Hills to Heaven: Love, Hope, and a Restaurant in Rwanda. New York: Little, Brown and Company, 2013.
- Ruxin, Josh; Antoinette Habinshuti. "Crowd control in Rwanda", Nature 474: 572–573, June 30, 2011.
- Ruxin, Josh, et al. "Emerging consensus in HIV/AIDS, malaria, tuberculosis, and access to essential medicines", Lancet, 365:618-21, 2005.
- Ruxin, Josh, Agnes Binagwaho and Paul A. Wilson. "Combating AIDS in the Developing World." Earthscan, 2005.

== See also ==
- Health Builders
- Goodlife Pharmacy
