= 2026 UCI BMX Racing World Cup =

- Sport: BMX racing
- Hosts: (France) Sarrians (Netherlands) Papendal (China) Beijing (China) Zhangjiakou (United States) Sarasota
- Duration: 6 June – 1 November
- Men Elite: (gold) (Netherlands) Jaymio Brink; (silver) (France) Arthur Pilard; (bronze) (France) Jérémy Rencurel
- Women Elite: (gold) (Netherlands) Laura Smulders; (silver) (United Kingdom) Bethany Shriever; (bronze) (Switzerland) Zoe Claessens
- Men Under 23: (gold) (France) Clément Rocherieux; (silver) (France) Pierre Geisse; (bronze) (France) Matteo Faure
- Women Under 23: (gold) (United Kingdom) Freia Challis; (silver) (United States) Derin Merten; (bronze) (Australia) Isabella Schramm

Seasons
- ← 2025 2027 →

The 2026 UCI BMX Racing World Cup is the annual edition of the UCI BMX Racing World Cup in the Olympic bmx racing event, governed by the UCI.

== Calendar ==
The calendar for the 2026 UCI BMX Racing World Cup include 5 stages (10 rounds).

Date	Location	Ref.
6–7 June	Sarrians, France	
13–14 June	Papendal, Netherlands	
2–3 October	Beijing, China	
10–11 October	Zhangjiakou, China	
31 October –1 November	Sarasota, United States	

== Results ==
=== Men's elite ===
Stage	Venue	1st place, gold medalist(s)	2nd place, silver medalist(s)	3rd place, bronze medalist(s)
1	(France) Sarrians	Jaymio Brink (NED)	Diego Arboleda (COL)	Sylvain André (FRA)
2	(France) Sarrians	Diego Arboleda (COL)	Eddy Clerté (FRA)	Cameron Wood (USA)
3	(Netherlands) Papendal	Loris Aeberhard (SUI)	Jaymio Brink (NED)	Cameron Wood (USA)
4	(Netherlands) Papendal	Loris Aeberhard (SUI)	Jaymio Brink (NED)	Eddy Clerté (FRA)
5	(China) Beijing	Arthur Pilard (FRA)	Evan Oliveira (FRA)	Joshua Jolly (AUS)
6	(China) Beijing	Joshua Jolly (AUS)	Jérémy Rencurel (FRA)	Filib Steiner (SUI)
7	(China) Zhangjiakou	Joshua Jolly (AUS)	Juan Velasquez Carmona (COL)	Casper Pipers (NED)
8	(China) Zhangjiakou	Cédric Butti (SUI)	Mark Lüthi (SUI)	Filib Steiner (SUI)
9	(United States) Sarasota	Leo Garoyan (FRA)	Juan Naranjo (COL)	Carlos Ramirez Yepes (COL)
10	(United States) Sarasota	Jérémy Rencurel (FRA)	Evan Oliveira (FRA)	Mateo Carmona Garcia (COL)

=== Women's elite ===
Stage	Venue	1st place, gold medalist(s)	2nd place, silver medalist(s)	3rd place, bronze medalist(s)
1	(France) Sarrians	Molly Simpson (CAN)	Malene Kejlstrup (DEN)	Saya Sakakibara (AUS)
2	(France) Sarrians	Saya Sakakibara (AUS)	Molly Simpson (CAN)	Michelle Wissing (NED)
3	(Netherlands) Papendal	Laura Smulders (NED)	Molly Simpson (CAN)	Beth Shriever (GBR)
4	(Netherlands) Papendal	Beth Shriever (GBR)	Saya Sakakibara (AUS)	Molly Simpson (CAN)
5	(China) Beijing	Laura Smulders (NED)	Bethany Shriever (GBR)	Sienna Pal (AUS)
6	(China) Beijing	Zoe Claessens (SUI)	Molly Simpson (CAN)	Laura Smulders (NED)
7	(China) Zhangjiakou	Bethany Shriever (GBR)	Leila Walker (NZL)	Zoe Claessens (SUI)
8	(China) Zhangjiakou	Laura Smulders (NED)	Bethany Shriever (GBR)	Teya Rufus (AUS)
9	(United States) Sarasota	Bethany Shriever (GBR)	Laura Smulders (NED)	Molly Simpson (CAN)
10	(United States) Sarasota	Zoe Claessens (SUI)	Laura Smulders (NED)	Leila Walker (NZL)

=== Men under 23 ===
Stage	Venue	1st place, gold medalist(s)	2nd place, silver medalist(s)	3rd place, bronze medalist(s)
1	(France) Sarrians	Léo Le Bougeant (FRA)	Joshua Jolly (AUS)	Clément Rocherieux (FRA)
2	(France) Sarrians	Clément Rocherieux (FRA)	Léo Le Bougeant (FRA)	Mathis Jacquet (FRA)
3	(Netherlands) Papendal	Mathis Jacquet (FRA)	Jesse de Veer (NED)	Clément Rocherieux (FRA)
4	(Netherlands) Papendal	Joshua Jolly (AUS)	Mark Lüthi (SUI)	Seal Nünlist (SUI)
5	(China) Beijing	Clément Rocherieux (FRA)	Matteo Faure (FRA)	Alexandre Emmel (SUI)
6	(China) Beijing	Mathis Jacquet (FRA)	Clément Rocherieux (FRA)	Mark Lüthi (SUI)
7	(China) Zhangjiakou	Pierre Geisse (FRA)	Clément Rocherieux (FRA)	Tommy Bruney (USA)
8	(China) Zhangjiakou	Pierre Geisse (FRA)	Clément Rocherieux (FRA)	Mathis Jacquet (FRA)
9	(United States) Sarasota	Matteo Faure (FRA)	Titouan Faure (FRA)	Pierre Geisse (FRA)
10	(United States) Sarasota	Matteo Faure (FRA)	Titouan Faure (FRA)	Yorgi Piccart (BEL)

=== Women under 23 ===
Stage	Venue	1st place, gold medalist(s)	2nd place, silver medalist(s)	3rd place, bronze medalist(s)
1	(France) Sarrians	Freia Challis (GBR)	Isabella Schramm (AUS)	Robyn Gommers (BEL)
2	(France) Sarrians	Renske van Santvoort (NED)	Laura Mougey (FRA)	Freia Challis (GBR)
3	(Netherlands) Papendal	Sabina Košárková (CZE)	Alexis Alden (USA)	Lissi van Schijndel (NED)
4	(Netherlands) Papendal	Renske van Santvoort (NED)	Lily Greenough (NZL)	Sabina Košárková (CZE)
5	(China) Beijing	Freia Challis (GBR)	Maya Savina (AIN)	Lily Greenough (NZL)
6	(China) Beijing	Freia Challis (GBR)	Lily Greenough (NZL)	Derin Merten (USA)
7	(China) Zhangjiakou	Freia Challis (GBR)	Derin Merten (USA)	Isabella Schramm (AUS)
8	(China) Zhangjiakou	Freia Challis (GBR)	Derin Merten (USA)	Isabella Schramm (AUS)
9	(United States) Sarasota	Freia Challis (GBR)	Derin Merten (USA)	Aleksandra Simashkina (AIN)
10	(United States) Sarasota	Freia Challis (GBR)	Derin Merten (USA)	Maya Savina (AIN)

== Standings ==
=== Men elite ===
Pos.	Racer	Points
1	(Netherlands) Jaymio Brink	2150
2	(France) Arthur Pilard	2040
3	(France) Jérémy Rencurel	1873
4	(Switzerland) Cédric Butti	1809
5	(Switzerland) Loris Aeberhard	1792
6	(France) Leo Garoyan	1784
7	(Australia) Joshua Jolly	1735
8	(France) Evan Oliveira	1728
9	(France) Mathis Ragot Richard	1712
10	(United States) Cameron Wood	1505

=== Women elite ===
Pos.	Racer	Points
1	(Netherlands) Laura Smulders	3721
2	(United Kingdom) Bethany Shriever	3623
3	(Switzerland) Zoe Claessens	3199
4	(Canada) Molly Simpson	3028
5	(Switzerland) Nadine Aeberhard	2318
6	(New Zealand) Leila Walker	2137
7	(Australia) Teya Rufus	1795
8	(Netherlands) Michelle Wissing	1646
9	(Netherlands) Merel Smulders	1500
10	(Australia) Saya Sakakibara	1416

=== Men Under 23 ===
Pos.	Racer	Points
1	(France) Clément Rocherieux	1229
2	(France) Pierre Geisse	869
3	(France) Matteo Faure	865
4	(France) Mathis Jacquet	856
5	(United States) Tommy Bruney	672
6	(Switzerland) Alexandre Emmel	599
7	(Belgium) Yorgi Piccart	531
8	(Switzerland) Mark Lüthi	477
9	(Australia) Joshua Jolly	422
10	(Denmark) Jonas Idskov	352

=== Women Under 23 ===
Pos.	Racer	Points
1	(United Kingdom) Freia Challis	1334
2	(United States) Derin Merten	747
3	(Australia) Isabella Schramm	700
4	(Individual Neutral Athletes) Maya Savina	672
5	(New Zealand) Lily Greenough	645
6	(Individual Neutral Athletes) Sofia Sitnikova-Rykhlitskaya	620
7	(Netherlands) Renske van Santvoort	477
8	(Individual Neutral Athletes) Alexandra Simashkina	416
9	(France) Laura Mougey	397
10	(Czech Republic) Sabina Košárková	392

== Medal summary ==
Ranking by round

Rank	Nation	Gold	Silver	Bronze	Total
1	France (FRA)	12	12	7	31
2	Great Britain (GBR)	10	2	2	14
3	Netherlands (NED)	6	5	4	15
4	Switzerland (SUI)	5	2	6	13
5	Australia (AUS)	4	3	6	13
6	Canada (CAN)	1	3	2	6
6	Colombia (COL)	1	3	2	6
8	Czech Republic (CZE)	1	0	1	2
9	United States (USA)	0	5	4	9
10	New Zealand (NZL)	0	3	2	5
11	Individual Neutral Athletes (AIN)	0	1	2	3
12	Denmark (DEN)	0	1	0	1
13	Belgium (BEL)	0	0	2	2
Totals (13 entries)		40	40	40	120
