= 2023 UCI BMX Racing World Cup =

- Sport: BMX racing
- Hosts: (Turkey) Sakarya (Netherlands) Papendal (France) Sarrians (Argentina) Santiago del Estero (2 times)
- Duration: 3 June – 14 October
- Men Elite: (gold) (France) Romain Mahieu; (silver) (France) Joris Daudet; (bronze) (Colombia) Diego Arboleda
- Women Elite: (gold) (Australia) Saya Sakakibara; (silver) (United Kingdom) Beth Shriever; (bronze) (Netherlands) Laura Smulders
- Men Under 23: (gold) (New Zealand) Rico Bearman; (silver) (France) Matéo Colsenet; (bronze) (Argentina) Thomas Maturano
- Women Under 23: (gold) (France) Tessa Martinez; (silver) (Latvia) Veronika Stūriška; (bronze) (United States) Ava Corley

Seasons
- ← 2022 2024 →

The 2023 UCI BMX Racing World Cup is the annual edition of the UCI BMX Racing World Cup in the Olympic bmx racing event, governed by the UCI.

== Calendar ==
The calendar for the 2023 UCI BMX Racing World Cup include 5 stages (10 rounds).

Date	Location	Ref.
3–4 June	Sakarya, Turkey	
24–25 June	Papendal, Netherlands	
23–24 September	Sarrians, France	
7–8 October	Santiago del Estero, Argentina	
13–14 October	Santiago del Estero, Argentina	

== Results ==
=== Men's elite ===
Stage	Venue	1st place, gold medalist(s)	2nd place, silver medalist(s)	3rd place, bronze medalist(s)
1	(Turkey) Sakarya	Romain Mahieu (FRA)	Diego Arboleda (COL)	Joris Daudet (FRA)
2	(Turkey) Sakarya	Joris Daudet (FRA)	Romain Mahieu (FRA)	Izaac Kennedy (AUS)
3	(Netherlands) Papendal	Romain Mahieu (FRA)	Arthur Pilard (FRA)	Diego Arboleda (COL)
4	(Netherlands) Papendal	Joris Daudet (FRA)	Sylvain André (FRA)	Mateo Carmona (COL)
5	(France) Sarrians	Cancelled due to strong wind		
6	(France) Sarrians	Joris Daudet (FRA)	Sylvain André (FRA)	Jérémy Rencurel (FRA)
7	(Argentina) Santiago del Estero	Romain Mahieu (FRA)	Joris Daudet (FRA)	Nicolás Torres (ARG)
8	(Argentina) Santiago del Estero	Romain Mahieu (FRA)	Cameron Wood (USA)	Simon Marquart (SUI)
9	(Argentina) Santiago del Estero	Cameron Wood (USA)	Romain Mahieu (FRA)	Bodi Turner (AUS)
10	(Argentina) Santiago del Estero	Romain Mahieu (FRA)	Niek Kimmann (NED)	Quillan Isidore (GBR)

=== Women's elite ===
Stage	Venue	1st place, gold medalist(s)	2nd place, silver medalist(s)	3rd place, bronze medalist(s)
1	(Turkey) Sakarya	Beth Shriever (GBR)	Zoé Claessens (SUI)	Alise Willoughby (USA)
2	(Turkey) Sakarya	Beth Shriever (GBR)	Alise Willoughby (USA)	Laura Smulders (NED)
3	(Netherlands) Papendal	Saya Sakakibara (AUS)	Laura Smulders (NED)	Merel Smulders (NED)
4	(Netherlands) Papendal	Beth Shriever (GBR)	Saya Sakakibara (AUS)	Alise Willoughby (USA)
5	(France) Sarrians	Cancelled due to strong wind		
6	(France) Sarrians	Saya Sakakibara (AUS)	Zoé Claessens (SUI)	Merel Smulders (NED)
7	(Argentina) Santiago del Estero	Beth Shriever (GBR)	Saya Sakakibara (AUS)	Felicia Stancil (USA)
8	(Argentina) Santiago del Estero	Saya Sakakibara (AUS)	Beth Shriever (GBR)	Axelle Étienne (FRA)
9	(Argentina) Santiago del Estero	Saya Sakakibara (AUS)	Laura Smulders (NED)	Felicia Stancil (USA)
10	(Argentina) Santiago del Estero	Saya Sakakibara (AUS)	Merel Smulders (NED)	Alise Willoughby (USA)

=== Men under 23 ===
Stage	Venue	1st place, gold medalist(s)	2nd place, silver medalist(s)	3rd place, bronze medalist(s)
1	(Turkey) Sakarya	Rico Bearman (NZL)	Marek Neužil (CZE)	Filib Steiner (SUI)
2	(Turkey) Sakarya	Rico Bearman (NZL)	Hugo Marszałek (FRA)	Callum Russell (GBR)
3	(Netherlands) Papendal	Rico Bearman (NZL)	Matéo Colsenet (FRA)	Tim Goossens (NED)
4	(Netherlands) Papendal	Rico Bearman (NZL)	Yuichi Masuda (JPN)	Casper Pipers (NED)
5	(France) Sarrians	Cancelled due to strong wind		
6	(France) Sarrians	Kip Stauffacher (SUI)	Matéo Colsenet (FRA)	Mathis Jacquet (FRA)
7	(Argentina) Santiago del Estero	Thomas Maturano (ARG)	Rico Bearman (NZL)	Matéo Colsenet (FRA)
8	(Argentina) Santiago del Estero	Matéo Colsenet (FRA)	Thomas Maturano (ARG)	Marek Neužil (CZE)
9	(Argentina) Santiago del Estero	Rico Bearman (NZL)	Tim Goossens (NED)	Thomas Maturano (ARG)
10	(Argentina) Santiago del Estero	Rico Bearman (NZL)	Matéo Colsenet (FRA)	Tim Goossens (NED)

=== Women under 23 ===
Stage	Venue	1st place, gold medalist(s)	2nd place, silver medalist(s)	3rd place, bronze medalist(s)
1	(Turkey) Sakarya	Tessa Martinez (FRA)	Zoé Hapka (FRA)	Michelle Wissing (NED)
2	(Turkey) Sakarya	Tessa Martinez (FRA)	Francesca Cingolani (ITA)	McKenzie Gayheart (USA)
3	(Netherlands) Papendal	Veronika Stūriška (LAT)	Tessa Martinez (FRA)	Megan Williams (NZL)
4	(Netherlands) Papendal	Veronika Stūriška (LAT)	Tessa Martinez (FRA)	Aiko Gommers (BEL)
5	(France) Sarrians	Cancelled due to strong wind		
6	(France) Sarrians	Michelle Wissing (NED)	Renske van Santvoort (NED)	Aiko Gommers (BEL)
7	(Argentina) Santiago del Estero	Ava Corley (USA)	Veronika Stūriška (LAT)	Emily Hutt (GBR)
8	(Argentina) Santiago del Estero	Tessa Martinez (FRA)	Isabell May (AUS)	McKenzie Gayheart (USA)
9	(Argentina) Santiago del Estero	Ava Corley (USA)	Sharid Fayad (COL)	Aiko Gommers (BEL)
10	(Argentina) Santiago del Estero	Ava Corley (USA)	Sharid Fayad (COL)	Mariana Agudelo (COL)

== Standings ==
Standings after round 10 in Santiago del Estero

=== Men elite ===
Pos.	Racer	Points
1	Romain Mahieu (FRA)	3543
2	Joris Daudet (FRA)	3094
3	Diego Arboleda (COL)	2159
4	Niek Kimmann (NED)	1763
5	Simon Marquart (SUI)	1589
6	Carlos Ramírez (COL)	1581
7	Jérémy Rencurel (FRA)	1522
8	Sylvain André (FRA)	1464
9	Mateo Carmona (COL)	1396
10	Quillan Isidore (GBR)	1363

=== Women elite ===
Pos.	Racer	Points
1	Saya Sakakibara (AUS)	3775
2	Beth Shriever (GBR)	3044
3	Laura Smulders (NED)	2680
4	Alise Willoughby (USA)	2480
5	Merel Smulders (NED)	2334
6	Zoé Claessens (SUI)	2035
7	Molly Simpson (CAN)	1914
8	Felicia Stancil (USA)	1771
9	Mariana Pajón (COL)	1764
10	Gabriela Bolle (COL)	1328

=== Men Under 23 ===
Pos.	Racer	Points
1	Rico Bearman (NZL)	1288
2	Matéo Colsenet (FRA)	956
3	Thomas Maturano (ARG)	599
4	Tim Goossens (NED)	583
5	Callum Russell (GBR)	494
6	Casper Pipers (NED)	485
7	Hugo Marszałek (FRA)	482
8	Marco Radaelli (ITA)	447
9	Marek Neužil (CZE)	416
10	Federico Capello (ARG)	390

=== Women Under 23 ===
Pos.	Racer	Points
1	Tessa Martinez (FRA)	976
2	Veronika Stūriška (LAT)	862
3	Ava Corley (USA)	787
4	Michelle Wissing (NED)	649
5	Sharid Fayad (COL)	640
6	Emily Hutt (GBR)	614
7	Aiko Gommers (BEL)	588
8	Megan Williams (NZL)	584
9	Mckenzie Gayheart (USA)	548
10	Valerie Vossen (BEL)	412

== Medal summary ==
Ranking by round

Rank	Nation	Gold	Silver	Bronze	Total
1	France (FRA)	12	13	5	30
2	New Zealand (NZL)	6	1	1	8
3	Australia (AUS)	5	3	2	10
4	United States (USA)	4	2	7	13
5	Great Britain (GBR)	4	1	3	8
6	Latvia (LAT)	2	1	0	3
7	Netherlands (NED)	1	6	7	14
8	Switzerland (SUI)	1	2	2	5
9	Argentina (ARG)	1	1	2	4
10	Colombia (COL)	0	3	3	6
11	Czech Republic (CZE)	0	1	1	2
12	Italy (ITA)	0	1	0	1
12	Japan (JPN)	0	1	0	1
14	Belgium (BEL)	0	0	3	3
Totals (14 entries)		36	36	36	108
