= 2019 in cycle sport =

The 2019 in cycling results is given as follows:

== Cycle ball ==
=== International indoor cycling events ===
- May 31 & June 1: 2019 UEC Junior Indoor Cycling European Championships in (France) Geispolsheim
  - Junior Women's winner: (Austria) Lorena Schneider
  - Junior Pair winners: Germany (Alexander Brandl & Andreas Steger) (m) / Germany (Anika Papok & Anna-Sophia von Schneyder) (f)
  - Junior Act 4 winners: Switzerland (Valerie Unternährer, Tina Schönenberger, Selina Niedermann, & Stefanie Haas)
  - Junior Cycle Ball winners: Switzerland (Timon Fröhlich & Yannick Fröhlich)
- September 21: 2019 UEC U23 Cycle-Ball European Championships in (Germany) Wiesbaden-Naurod
- December 6 – 8: 2019 UCI Indoor Cycling World Championships (Artistic & Cycle-ball) in (Switzerland) Basel

=== 2019 Artistic Cycling World Cup ===
- March 9: ACWC #1 in (Czech Republic) Prague
  - Elite Single Artistic Cycling winners: (Germany) Lukas Kohl (m) / (Germany) Milena Slupina (f)
  - Women's Elite Pair Artistic Cycling winners: Germany (Sophie-Marie Nattmann & Caroline Wurth)
  - Mixed Elite Pair Artistic Cycling winners: Germany (Serafin Schefold & Max Hanselmann)
  - Mixed Elite Artistic Cycling ACT4 winners: Germany (Ramona Ressel, Julia Dörner, Annamaria Milo, & Anna-Lena Vollbrecht)
- May 25: ACWC #2 in (Belgium) Merelbeke
  - Elite Single Artistic Cycling winners: (Germany) Lukas Kohl (m) / (Germany) Milena Slupina (f)
  - Women's Elite Pair Artistic Cycling winners: Germany (Selina Marquardt & Helen Vordermeier)
  - Mixed Elite Pair Artistic Cycling winners: Germany (Patrick Tisch & Nina Stapf)
  - Mixed Elite Artistic Cycling ACT4 winners: Germany (Lukas Kayko, Roxanne Ludwig, Vanessa Wörner, & Eva Zimmermann)
- August 10: ACWC #3 in (Hungary) Bokod
- November 30: ACWC #4 (final) in (Germany) Erlenbach

=== 2019 Cycle-Ball World Cup ===
- January 19: CBWC #1 in (Germany) Klein-Gerau
  - Winners: Austria (Markus Bröll & Patrick Schnetzer)
- April 6: CBWC #2 in (Germany) Ailingen
  - Winners: Austria (Markus Bröll & Patrick Schnetzer)
- April 27: CBWC #3 in Albungen
  - Winners: Germany (André Kopp & Raphael Kopp)
- May 18: CBWC #4 in Mücheln
  - Winners: Germany (Eric Haedicke & Max Rückschloß)
- August 31: CBWC #5 in (Germany) Grosskoschen
  - Winners: Austria (Markus Bröll & Patrick Schnetzer)
- September 28: CBWC #6 in (Germany) Niedermehnen
  - Winners: Austria (Markus Bröll & Patrick Schnetzer)
- October 12: CBWC #7 in (Switzerland) St. Gallen
  - Winners: Germany (Bernd Mlady & Gerhard Mlady)
- November 2: CBWC #8 in (Austria) Höchst
- January 18, 2020: CBWC #9 (final) in (Switzerland) Möhlin

== Cycling – BMX ==
=== 2020 Summer Olympics ===
- October 12 & 13: Tokyo 2020 Test Event at the Olympic BMX Course in (Japan) Tokyo at Ariake Urban Sports Park
  - Elite winners: (France) Romain Mahieu (m) / (Australia) Saya Sakakibara (f)
  - Women's Junior winner: (Switzerland) Zoe Claessens

=== International BMX events ===
- January 19: 2019 Oceania BMX Continental Championships in (New Zealand) Te Awamutu
  - Elite winners: (Australia) Kai Sakakibara (m) / (Australia) Saya Sakakibara (f)
  - Junior winners: (New Zealand) Tasman Wakelin (m) / (New Zealand) Jessie Smith (f)
- July 13 & 14: 2019 UEC Juniors & Elite European Championships and European Challenge in (Latvia) Valmiera
  - Elite winners: (Netherlands) Niek Kimmann (m) / (Netherlands) Laura Smulders (f)
  - Junior winners: (United Kingdom) Ross Cullen (m) / (Switzerland) Zoe Claessens (f)
- July 23 – 28: 2019 UCI BMX World Championships in (Belgium) Heusden-Zolder
  - Elite winners: (Netherlands) Twan van Gendt (m) / (United States) Alise Willoughby (f)
  - Junior winners: (France) Tatyan Lui-Hin Tsan (m) / (New Zealand) Jessie Smith (f)

=== 2019 UCI BMX Supercross World Cup ===
- April 27 & 28: SCWC #1 & #2 in (United Kingdom) Manchester
  - Men's Elite winners: (France) Joris Daudet (#1) / (United Kingdom) Kye Whyte(#2)
  - Women's Elite winners: (Denmark) Simone Christensen (#1) / (France) Manon Valentino (#2)
- May 11 & 12: SCWC #3 & #4 in (Netherlands) Papendal
  - Men's Elite winner: (Netherlands) Niek Kimmann (2 times)
  - Women's Elite winners: (Netherlands) Judy Baauw (#1) / (Netherlands) Laura Smulders (#2)
- June 8 & 9: SCWC #5 & #6 in (France) Saint-Quentin-en-Yvelines
  - Men's Elite winner: (Netherlands) Niek Kimmann (2 times)
  - Women's Elite winners: (Netherlands) Laura Smulders (#1) / (France) Manon Valentino (#2)
- September 13 & 14: SCWC #7 & #8 in (United States) Rock Hill
  - Men's Elite winners: (United States) Corben Sharrah (#1) / (Netherlands) Niek Kimmann (#2)
  - Women's Elite winner: (Netherlands) Laura Smulders (2 times)
- September 28 & 29: SCWC #9 & #10 (final) in (Argentina) Santiago del Estero
  - Men's Elite winners: (Argentina) Gonzalo Molina (#1) / (Netherlands) Niek Kimmann (#2)
  - Women's Elite winner: (Netherlands) Laura Smulders (2 times)

=== 2019 UEC BMX European Cup ===
- March 30 & 31: UEC BMX #1 & #2 in (Italy) Verona
  - Elite winners: (Netherlands) Niek Kimmann (m; 2 times) / (Netherlands) Laura Smulders (f; 2 times)
  - Men's Junior winner: (Netherlands) Bart van Bemmelen (2 times)
  - Women's Junior winners: (Switzerland) Zoe Claessens (#1) / (Switzerland) Nadine Aeberhard (#2)
- April 20 & 21: UEC BMX #3 & #4 in (Belgium) Heusden-Zolder
  - Men's Elite winners: (Netherlands) Dave van der Burg (#1) / (Netherlands) Joris Harmsen (#2)
  - Women's Elite winner: (Netherlands) Laura Smulders (f; 2 times)
  - Men's Junior winners: (United Kingdom) Ross Cullen (#1) / (Latvia) Edvards Glazers (#2)
  - Women's Junior winners: (New Zealand) Jessie Smith (#1) / (Switzerland) Zoe Claessens (#2)
- May 4 & 5: UEC BMX #5 & #6 in (Norway) Rade
  - Men's Elite winners: (France) Eddy Clerte (#1) / (Norway) Tore Navrestad (#2)
  - Women's Elite winners: (Brazil) Paola Reis Santos (#1) / (New Zealand) Rebecca Petch (#2)
  - Men's Junior winners: (Italy) Federico de Vecchi (#1) / (France) Robin Genestroni (#2)
  - Women's Junior winner: (Denmark) Malene Kejlstrup Sørensen (2 times)
- May 25 & 26: UEC BMX #7 & #8 in (France) Sarrians
  - Men's Elite winner: (France) Sylvain André (2 times)
  - Women's Elite winners: (Australia) Saya Sakakibara (#1) / (France) Manon Valentino (#2)
  - Men's Junior winners: (United Kingdom) Ryan Martin (#1) / (Netherlands) Bart van Bemmelen (#2)
  - Women's Junior winners: (Switzerland) Zoe Claessens (#1) / (New Zealand) Jessie Smith (#2)
- August 31 & September 1: UEC BMX #9 & #10 (final) in (Belgium) Peer
  - Men's Elite winners: (Netherlands) Joris Harmsen (#1) / (United Kingdom) Quillan Isidore (#2)
  - Women's Elite winners: (Netherlands) Merel Smulders (#1) / (Switzerland) Christelle Boivin (#2)
  - Men's Junior winners: (Latvia) Edvards Glazers (#1) / (Netherlands) Bart van Bemmelen (#2)
  - Women's Junior winners: (Switzerland) Zoe Claessens (#1) / (Denmark) Malene Kejlstrup Sørensen (#2)

=== 2019 UCI BMX Freestyle World Cup ===
- April 19 – 21: BMX FWC #1 in (Japan) Hiroshima
  - Elite Park winners: (Australia) Brandon Loupos (m) / (United States) Hannah Roberts (f)
  - Elite Flatland winners: (Japan) Ryo Katagiri (m) / (Japan) Misaki Katagiri (f)
- May 29 – June 2: BMX FWC #2 in (France) Montpellier
  - Elite Park winners: (United States) Juatin Dowell (m) / (United States) Hannah Roberts (f)
  - Elite Flatland winners: (Czech Republic) Dominik Nekolný (m) / (Japan) Misaki Katagiri (f)
- October 31 – November 3: BMX FWC #3 in (China) Chengdu

== Cycling – Cyclo-cross ==
=== 2018–19 International Cyclo-cross events ===
- November 3 & 4, 2018: 2018 Pan American Cyclo-cross Championships in (Canada) Midland
  - Elite winners: (United States) Curtis White (m) / (Canada) Maghalie Rochette (f)
  - Men's Junior winner: (United States) Magnus Sheffield
  - U23 winners: (United States) Gage Hecht (m) / (United States) Clara Honsinger (f)
- November 3 & 4, 2018: 2018 UEC Cyclo-cross European Championships in (Netherlands) Rosmalen
  - Elite winners: (Netherlands) Mathieu van der Poel (m) / (Netherlands) Annemarie Worst (f)
  - Men's Junior winner: (Netherlands) Pim Ronhaar
  - U23 winners: (United Kingdom) Tom Pidcock (m) / (Netherlands) Ceylin del Carmen Alvarado (f)
- November 30 & December 1, 2018: 2018 UCI Masters Cyclo-cross World Championships in (Belgium) Mol
  - For detailed results, click here.
- February 2 & 3: 2019 UCI Cyclo-cross World Championships in (Denmark) Bogense
  - Elite winners: (Netherlands) Mathieu van der Poel (m) / (Belgium) Sanne Cant
  - Men's Junior winner: (United Kingdom) Ben Tulett
  - U23 winners: (United Kingdom) Tom Pidcock (m) / (Netherlands) Inge van der Heijden (f)

=== 2018–19 UCI Cyclo-cross World Cup ===
- September 23, 2018: CCWC #1 in (United States) Waterloo
  - Elite winners: (Belgium) Toon Aerts (m) / (Netherlands) Marianne Vos (f)
- September 29, 2018: CCWC #2 in (United States) Iowa City
  - Elite winners: (Belgium) Toon Aerts (m) / (United States) Kaitlin Keough (f)
- October 21, 2018: CCWC #3 in (Switzerland) Bern
  - Elite winners: (Netherlands) Mathieu van der Poel (m) / (Netherlands) Marianne Vos (f)
  - Men's Junior winner: (Belgium) Witse Meeussen
  - Men's U23 winner: (Belgium) Eli Iserbyt
- November 17, 2018: CCWC #4 in (Czech Republic) Tábor
  - Elite winners: (Netherlands) Mathieu van der Poel (m) / (Netherlands) Lucinda Brand (f)
  - Men's Junior winner: (Belgium) Witse Meeussen
  - Men's U23 winner: (United Kingdom) Tom Pidcock
- November 25, 2018: CCWC #5 in (Belgium) Koksijde
  - Elite winners: (Netherlands) Mathieu van der Poel (m) / (Netherlands) Denise Betsema (f)
  - Men's Junior winner: (Netherlands) Pim Ronhaar
  - Men's U23 winner: (United Kingdom) Tom Pidcock
- December 23, 2018: CCWC #6 in (Belgium) Namur
  - Elite winners: (Netherlands) Mathieu van der Poel (m) / (Netherlands) Lucinda Brand (f)
  - Men's Junior winner: (Belgium) Ryan Cortjens
  - Men's U23 winner: (United Kingdom) Tom Pidcock
- December 26, 2018: CCWC #7 in (Belgium) Heusden-Zolder
  - Elite winners: (Netherlands) Mathieu van der Poel (m) / (Netherlands) Marianne Vos (f)
  - Men's Junior winner: (Belgium) Ryan Cortjens
  - Men's U23 winner: (Belgium) Eli Iserbyt
- January 20: CCWC #8 in (France) Pontchâteau
  - Elite winners: (Belgium) Wout van Aert (m) / (Netherlands) Marianne Vos (f)
  - Men's Junior winner: (Belgium) Thibau Nys
  - Men's U23 winner: (United Kingdom) Tom Pidcock
- January 27: CCWC #9 (final) in (Netherlands) Hoogerheide
  - Elite winners: (Netherlands) Mathieu van der Poel (m) / (Netherlands) Lucinda Brand (f)
  - Men's Junior winner: (Belgium) Witse Meeussen
  - Men's U23 winner: (Belgium) Eli Iserbyt

=== 2018–19 Cyclo-cross Superprestige ===
- October 14, 2018: CCS #1 in (Netherlands) Gieten
  - Elite winners: (Netherlands) Mathieu van der Poel (m) / (Netherlands) Annemarie Worst (f)
  - Men's Junior winner: (Belgium) Witse Meeussen
- October 20, 2018: CCS #2 in (Belgium) Boom
  - Elite winners: (Netherlands) Mathieu van der Poel (m) / (Belgium) Kim van de Steene (f)
  - Men's Junior winner: (Belgium) Lennert Belmans
- October 28, 2018: CCS #3 in (Belgium) Oostkamp-Ruddervoorde
  - Elite winners: (Netherlands) Mathieu van der Poel (m) / (Netherlands) Marianne Vos (f)
  - Men's Junior winner: (Belgium) Witse Meeussen
- November 11, 2018: CCS #4 in (Belgium) Gavere
  - Elite winners: (Netherlands) Mathieu van der Poel (m) / (Italy) Alice Maria Arzuffi (f)
  - Men's Junior winner: (Belgium) Ryan Cortjens
- December 16, 2018: CCS #5 in (Belgium) Zonhoven
  - Elite winners: (Netherlands) Mathieu van der Poel (m) / (Belgium) Sanne Cant (f)
  - Men's Junior winner: (Belgium) Ryan Cortjens
- December 30, 2018: CCS #6 in (Belgium) Diegem
  - Elite winners: (Netherlands) Mathieu van der Poel (m) / (Belgium) Sanne Cant (f)
  - Men's Junior winner: (Belgium) Witse Meeussen
- February 10: CCS #7 in (Belgium) Hoogstraten
  - Elite winners: (Netherlands) Mathieu van der Poel (m) / (Belgium) Sanne Cant (f)
  - Men's Junior winner: (Belgium) Thibau Nys
- February 16: CCS #8 (final) in (Belgium) Middelkerke
  - Elite winners: (Netherlands) Mathieu van der Poel (m) / (Netherlands) Denise Betsema (f)
  - Men's Junior winner: (Belgium) Witse Meeussen

=== 2018–19 DVV Trophy ===
- November 10, 2018: DVV #1 in (Belgium) Niel
  - Elite winners: (Netherlands) Mathieu van der Poel (m) / (Belgium) Sanne Cant (f)
  - Men's Junior winner: (Belgium) Dante Coremans
  - Men's U23 winner: (United Kingdom) Ben Turner
- November 18, 2018: DVV #2 in (Belgium) Hamme
  - Elite winners: (Netherlands) Mathieu van der Poel (m) / (Netherlands) Annemarie Worst (f)
  - Men's Junior winner: (Belgium) Thibau Nys
  - Men's U23 winner: (Belgium) Timo Kielich
- December 15, 2018: DVV #3 in (Belgium) Antwerp
  - Elite winners: (Netherlands) Mathieu van der Poel (m) / (Netherlands) Denise Betsema (f)
  - Men's Junior winner: (Netherlands) Lars Boven
  - Men's U23 winner: (Belgium) Niels Vandeputte
- December 28, 2018: DVV #4 in (Belgium) Loenhout
  - Elite winners: (Netherlands) Mathieu van der Poel (m) / (Netherlands) Lucinda Brand (f)
  - Men's Junior winner: (Belgium) Ryan Cortjens
  - Men's U23 winner: (United Kingdom) Ben Turner
- January 1: DVV #5 in (Belgium) Baal
  - Elite winners: (Netherlands) Mathieu van der Poel (m) / (Switzerland) Jolanda Neff (f)
  - Men's Junior winner: (Belgium) Thibau Nys
  - Men's U23 winner: (United Kingdom) Ben Turner
- February 9: DVV #6 (final) in (Belgium) Lille
  - Elite winners: (Netherlands) Mathieu van der Poel (m) / (Belgium) Sanne Cant (f)
  - Men's Junior winner: (Belgium) Thibau Nys
  - Men's U23 winner: (United Kingdom) Tom Pidcock

== Cycling – Mountain Bike ==
=== 2020 Summer Olympics ===
- October 4 – 6: Tokyo 2020 Test Event – Cycling Mountain Bike in (Japan) Izu (Izu Mountain Bike Course)
  - Elite XCO winners: (Switzerland) Nino Schurter (m) / (Switzerland) Jolanda Neff (f)

=== International mountain biking events ===
- April 3 – 6: 2019 Pan American Mountain Bike Championships (XCO, XCE, & XCR) in Aguascalientes City
  - Elite XCO winners: (Canada) Raphaël Gagné (m) / (United States) Kate Courtney (f)
  - Elite XCE winners: (Colombia) Jhon Fredy Garzon Gonzalez (m) / (Mexico) Fatima Anahi Hijar Marin (f)
  - Mixed Elite XCO Relay winners: Mexico
  - Junior XCO winners: (Mexico) Adair Zabdiel Gutierrez Prieto (m) / (Mexico) Natalia Marie Torres Macouzet (f)
  - U23 XCO winners: (United States) Christopher Blevins (m) / (United States) Haley Batten (f)
- April 8 – 10: 2019 Oceania Mountain Bike Championships (XCO & DHI) in (Australia) Bright
  - Elite XCO winners: (New Zealand) Anton Cooper (m) / (Australia) Rebecca Ellen McConnell (f)
  - Elite Women's Downhill winner: (Australia) Sian A'Hern
  - Junior XCO winners: (Australia) Corey Smith (m) / (Australia) Zoe Cuthbert (f)
  - U23 XCO winners: (Australia) Matthew Dinham (m) / (Australia) Sarah Tucknott (f)
- May 4 & 5: 2019 European Mountain Bike Championships (DHI only) in (Portugal) Pampilhosa da Serra
  - Elite Downhill winners: (France) Baptiste Pierron (m) / (Switzerland) Camille Balanche (f)
- June 29: 2019 European Continental Championships (Ultra XCM only) in (Spain) Vielha e Mijaran-Val d'Aran
  - Elite XCM winners: (Spain) Llibert Mill Garcia (m) / (Spain) Ramona Gabriel Batalla (f)
- July 25 – 28: 2019 European Continental Championships (XCE, XCO, & XCR) in (Czech Republic) Brno
  - Elite XCO winners: (Netherlands) Mathieu van der Poel (m) / (Switzerland) Jolanda Neff (f)
  - Elite XCE winners: (France) Hugo Briatta (m) / (Italy) Gaia Tormena (f)
  - Mixed Elite XCO Relay winners: Switzerland
  - Junior XCO winners: (Belgium) Lukas Malezsewski (m) / (Switzerland) Jacqueline Schneebeli (f)
  - U23 XCO winners: (Romania) Vlad Dascalu (m) / (Switzerland) Sina Frei (f)
- August 1 & 2: 2019 UCI Mountain Bike World Championships (4X only) in (Italy) Val di Sole
  - 4X winners: (France) Romain Mayet (m) / (Czech Republic) Romana Labounková (f)
- August 28 – September 1: 2019 UCI Mountain Bike World Championships (XCO, XCR, & DHI) in (Canada) Mont-Sainte-Anne
  - Elite XCO winners: (Switzerland) Nino Schurter (m) / (France) Pauline Ferrand-Prévot (f)
  - Elite Mixed Team XC Relay winners: Switzerland
  - Elite E-MTB XC winners: (South Africa) Alan Hatherly (m) / (Switzerland) Nathalie Schneitter (f)
  - Elite Downhill winners: (France) Loïc Bruni (m) / (France) Myriam Nicole (f)
  - Junior XCO winners: (United Kingdom) Charlie Aldridge (m) / (Switzerland) Jacqueline Schneebeli (f)
  - U23 XCO winners: (Romania) Vlad Dascalu (m) / (Switzerland) Sina Frei (f)
  - Junior Downhill winners: (Australia) Kye A'Hern (m) / (Austria) Valentina Höll (f)
- September 21 & 22: 2019 UCI Mountain Bike Marathon World Championships in (Switzerland) Grächen
  - Elite winners: (Colombia) Héctor Leonardo Páez (m) / (France) Pauline Ferrand-Prévot (f)

=== 2019 UCI Mountain Bike World Cup ===
- April 27 & 28: MBWC #1 (DHI only) in (Slovenia) Maribor
  - Elite Downhill winners: (France) Loïc Bruni (m) / (United Kingdom) Tahnée Seagrave (f)
  - Junior Downhill winners: (France) Thibaut Daprela (m) / (Austria) Valentina Höll (f)
- May 18 & 19: MBWC #2 (XCO & XCC) in (Germany) Albstadt
  - Elite XCO winners: (Switzerland) Mathias Flückiger (m) / (United States) Kate Courtney (f)
  - Elite XCC winners: (Netherlands) Mathieu van der Poel (m) / (United States) Kate Courtney (f)
  - U23 XCO winners: (Switzerland) Filippo Colombo (m) / (Austria) Laura Stigger (f)
- May 25 & 26: MBWC #3 (XCO & XCC) in (Czech Republic) Nové Město na Moravě
  - Elite XCO winners: (Netherlands) Mathieu van der Poel (m) / (United States) Kate Courtney (f)
  - Elite XCC winners: (Netherlands) Mathieu van der Poel (m) / (United States) Chloe Woodruff (f)
  - U23 XCO winners: (Romania) Vlad Dascalu (m) / (United States) Haley Batten (f)
- June 1 & 2: MBWC #4 (DHI only) in (United Kingdom) Fort William
  - Elite Downhill winners: (France) Loris Vergier (m) / (Australia) Tracey Hannah (f)
  - Junior Downhill winners: (France) Thibaut Daprela (m) / (United States) Anna Newkirk (f)
- June 8 & 9: MBWC #5 (DHI only) in (Austria) Leogang
  - Elite Downhill winners: (France) Loïc Bruni (m) / (Australia) Tracey Hannah (f)
  - Junior Downhill winners: (France) Thibaut Daprela (m) / (Austria) Valentina Höll (f)
- July 6 & 7: MBWC #6 (XCO, XCC, & DHI) in (Andorra) Vallnord-Pal Arinsal
  - Elite XCO winners: (Switzerland) Nino Schurter (m) / (Netherlands) Anne Terpstra (f)
  - Elite XCC winners: (Brazil) Henrique Avancini (m) / (Switzerland) Jolanda Neff (f)
  - Elite Downhill winners: (France) Loïc Bruni (m) / (United Kingdom) Rachel Atherton (f)
  - U23 XCO winners: (Romania) Vlad Dascalu (m) / (Germany) Ronja Eibl (f)
  - Junior Downhill winners: (France) Matteo Iniguez (m) / (Austria) Valentina Höll (f)
- July 13 & 14: MBWC #7 (XCO, XCC, & DHI) in (France) Les Gets
  - Elite XCO winners: (Switzerland) Nino Schurter (m) / (United States) Kate Courtney (f)
  - Elite XCC winners: (Netherlands) Mathieu van der Poel (m) / (United States) Kate Courtney (f)
  - Elite Downhill winners: (France) Amaury Pierron (m) / (Australia) Tracey Hannah (f)
  - U23 XCO winners: (Romania) Vlad Dascalu (m) / (Germany) Ronja Eibl (f)
  - Junior Downhill winners: (France) Thibaut Daprela (m) / (Austria) Valentina Höll (f)
- August 3 & 4: MBWC #8 (XCO, XCC, & DHI) in (Italy) Val di Sole
  - Elite XCO winners: (Netherlands) Mathieu van der Poel (m) / (France) Pauline Ferrand-Prévot (f)
  - Elite XCC winners: (Netherlands) Mathieu van der Poel (m) / (Switzerland) Jolanda Neff (f)
  - Elite Downhill winners: (United Kingdom) Laurie Greenland (m) / (France) Marine Cabirou (f)
  - U23 XCO winners: (Romania) Vlad Dascalu (m) / (Germany) Ronja Eibl (f)
  - Junior Downhill winners: (New Zealand) Tuhoto-Ariki Pene (m) / (Norway) Mille Johnset (f)
- August 10 & 11: MBWC #9 (XCO, XCC, & DHI) in (Switzerland) Lenzerheide
  - Elite XCO winners: (Netherlands) Mathieu van der Poel (m) / (Sweden) Jenny Rissveds (f)
  - Elite XCC winners: (Netherlands) Mathieu van der Poel (m) / (France) Pauline Ferrand-Prévot (f)
  - Elite Downhill winners: (France) Amaury Pierron (m) / (France) Marine Cabirou (f)
  - U23 XCO winners: (Switzerland) Filippo Colombo (m) / (Italy) Martina Berta (f)
  - Junior Downhill winners: (Canada) Seth Sherlock (m) / (Austria) Valentina Höll (f)
- September 7 & 8: MBWC #10 (XCO, XCC, & DHI) (final) in (United States) Snowshoe Mountain
  - Elite XCO winners: (Switzerland) Lars Forster (m) / (France) Pauline Ferrand-Prévot (f)
  - Elite XCC winners: (Switzerland) Nino Schurter (m) / (Sweden) Jenny Rissveds (f)
  - Elite Downhill winners: (United Kingdom) Danny Hart (m) / (France) Marine Cabirou (f)
  - U23 XCO winners: (Switzerland) Filippo Colombo (m) / (United Kingdom) Evie Richards (f)
  - Junior Downhill winners: (France) Thibaut Daprela (m) / (Austria) Valentina Höll (f)

== Cycling – Para-cycling ==
- Note: For all the results for the events below, click here.
- January 14 – 19: Asian Para Cycling Championships 2019 (Track) in (Indonesia) Jakarta
- March 14 – 17: 2019 UCI Para-cycling Track World Championships in (Netherlands) Apeldoorn
- May 9 – 12: 2019 UCI Para-cycling Road World Cup #1 (Road) in (Italy) Corridonia
- May 16 – 19: 2019 UCI Para-cycling Road World Cup #2 (Road) in (Belgium) Ostend
- August 8 – 11: 2019 UCI Para-cycling Road World Cup #3 (Road) in (Canada) Baie-Comeau
- September 12 – 15: 2019 UCI Para-cycling Road World Championships in (Netherlands) Emmen

== Cycling – Road ==
=== 2019 Grand Tour events ===
- May 11 – June 2: 2019 Giro d'Italia
  - Winner: (Ecuador) Richard Carapaz (Movistar Team) (first Giro d'Italia win & first Grand Tour win)
- July 6 – 28: 2019 Tour de France
  - Winner: (Colombia) Egan Bernal (Team Ineos) (first Tour de France win & first Grand Tour win)
- August 24 – September 15: 2019 Vuelta a España
  - Winner: (Slovenia) Primož Roglič (Team Jumbo–Visma) (first Vuelta a España win & first Grand Tour win)

=== International road cycling events ===
- November 21 – 25, 2018: Africa Cup in Eritrea (part of the 2018–19 UCI season of events)
  - Road Race winners: (Eritrea) Sirak Tesfom (m) / (South Africa) Maroesjka Matthee (f)
  - ITT Race winners: (Eritrea) Sirak Tesfom (m) / (Eritrea) Adiam Tesfalem (f)
  - TTT Race winners: Eritrea (m) / Eritrea (f)
- March 15 – 17: 2019 Oceania Cycling Championships in Australia
  - ITT winners: (Australia) Ben Dyball (m) / (Australia) Kate Perry (f)
  - U23 ITT winners: (Australia) Liam Magennis (m) / (Australia) Sarah Gigante (f)
  - Junior ITT winners: (New Zealand) Finn Fisher-Black (m) / (Australia) Francesca Sewell (f)
  - Senior Road Race winners: (Australia) Ben Dyball (m) / (New Zealand) Sharlotte Lucas (f)
  - U23 Road Race winners: (Australia) Tyler Lindorff (m) / (Australia) Sarah Gigante (f)
  - Junior Road Race winners: (New Zealand) Finn Fisher-Black (m) / (New Zealand) Ella Wyllie (f)
- March 15 – 20: 2019 African Continental Road Cycling Championships in Bahir Dar
  - Senior Road Race winners: (Eritrea) Mekseb Debesay (m) / (Eritrea) Mossana Debesay (f)
  - Men's Junior Road Race winner: (Rwanda) Renus Byiza Uhiriwe
  - Senior ITT winners: (South Africa) Stefan de Bod (m) / (Ethiopia) Selam Amha Gerefiel (f)
  - Senior TTT winners: Eritrea (m) / Ethiopia (f)
  - Junior TTT winners: Ethiopia (m) / Ethiopia (f)
- April 13 & 14: 2019 Elite Road Central American Championships in Nicaragua
  - Road Race winners: (Guatemala) Manuel Rodas (m) / (Costa Rica) María José Vargas (f)
  - ITT winners: (Guatemala) Manuel Rodas (m) / (Costa Rica) Natalia Navarro Cerdas (f)
- April 23 – 28: 2019 Asian Cycling Championships in Uzbekistan
  - Senior and ITT winners: (Kazakhstan) Yevgeniy Gidich (Road) & (Kazakhstan) Daniil Fominykh (ITT) (m) / (Uzbekistan) Olga Zabelinskaya (ITT) and (Road Race)) (f)
  - Road Race U23 winners: (Iran) Mohammad Ganjkhanlou (f)
  - Junior Road Race winners: (Thailand) Tullatorn Sosalam (m) / (Hong Kong) Sze Wing Lee (f)
  - U23 ITT winners: (Kazakhstan) Yevgeniy Fedorov (m) / (Chinese Taipei) Chuang Ting-ting (f)
  - Men's Junior ITT winner: (Kazakhstan) Maxim Popugayev
- May 2 – 5: 2019 Pan American Road Cycling Championships in Mexico
  - Road Race winners: (Ecuador) Jefferson Cepeda (m) / (Mexico) Ariadna Gutiérrez (f)
  - Men's U23 Road Race winners: (Ecuador) Santiago Montenegro
  - ITT winners: (Colombia) Brandon Smith Rivera (m) / (United States) Leah Thomas (f)
  - U23 ITT winners: (Chile) Diego Ferreyra (m) / (Trinidad and Tobago) Teniel Campbell (f)
- August 7 – 11: 2019 European Road Championships in Alkmaar
  - Elite Road Race winners: (Italy) Elia Viviani (m) / (Netherlands) Amy Pieters (f)
  - Elite ITT winners: (Belgium) Remco Evenepoel (m) / (Netherlands) Ellen van Dijk (f)
  - Junior Road Race winners: (Ukraine) Andrii Ponomar (m) / (Netherlands) Ilse Pluimers (f)
  - Junior ITT winners: (Italy) Andrea Piccolo (m) / (Netherlands) Shirin van Anrooij (f)
  - U23 Road Race winners: (Italy) Alberto Dainese (m) / (Italy) Letizia Paternoster (f)
  - U23 ITT winners: (Denmark) Johan Price-Pejtersen (m) / (Germany) Hannah Ludwig (f)
  - Mixed Team Relay (TT) winners: The Netherlands
- September 22 – 29: 2019 UCI Road World Championships in (United Kingdom) Harrogate
  - Elite Road Race winners: (Denmark) Mads Pedersen (m) / (Netherlands) Annemiek van Vleuten (f)
  - Elite ITT winners: (Australia) Rohan Dennis (m) / (United States) Chloé Dygert Owen (f)
  - Mixed Relay winners: Netherlands
  - Junior Road Race winners: (United States) Quinn Simmons (m) / (United States) Megan Jastrab (f)
  - Junior ITT winners: (Italy) Antonio Tiberi (m) / (Russia) Aigul Gareeva (f)
  - Men's U23 Road Race winner: (Italy) Samuele Battistella
  - Men's U23 ITT winner: (Denmark) Mikkel Bjerg

=== 2019 UCI World Tour ===
- January 15 – 20: (Australia) 2019 Tour Down Under Winner: (South Africa) Daryl Impey (Mitchelton–Scott)
- January 27: (Australia) 2019 Cadel Evans Great Ocean Road Race Winner: (Italy) Elia Viviani (Deceuninck–Quick-Step)
- February 24 – March 2: (United Arab Emirates) 2019 UAE Tour Winner: (Slovenia) Primož Roglič (Team Jumbo–Visma)
- March 2: (Belgium) 2019 Omloop Het Nieuwsblad Winner: (Czech Republic) Zdeněk Štybar (Deceuninck–Quick-Step)
- March 9: (Italy) 2019 Strade Bianche Winner: (France) Julian Alaphilippe (Deceuninck–Quick-Step)
- March 10 – 17: (France) 2019 Paris–Nice Winner: (Colombia) Egan Bernal (Team Sky)
- March 13 – 19: (Italy) 2019 Tirreno–Adriatico Winner: (Slovenia) Primož Roglič (Team Jumbo–Visma)
- March 23: (Italy) 2019 Milan–San Remo Winner: (France) Julian Alaphilippe (Deceuninck–Quick-Step)
- March 25 – 31: (Spain) 2019 Volta a Catalunya Winner: (Colombia) Miguel Ángel López (Astana)
- March 27: (Belgium) 2019 Three Days of Bruges–De Panne Winner: (Netherlands) Dylan Groenewegen (Team Jumbo–Visma)
- March 29: (Belgium) 2019 E3 BinckBank Classic Winner: (Czech Republic) Zdeněk Štybar (Deceuninck–Quick-Step)
- March 31: (Belgium) 2019 Gent–Wevelgem Winner: (Norway) Alexander Kristoff (UAE Team Emirates)
- April 3: (Belgium) 2019 Dwars door Vlaanderen Winner: (Netherlands) Mathieu van der Poel (Corendon–Circus)
- April 7: (Belgium) 2019 Tour of Flanders Winner: (Italy) Alberto Bettiol (EF Education First)
- April 8 – 13: (Spain) 2019 Tour of the Basque Country Winner: (Spain) Ion Izagirre (Astana Pro Team)
- April 14: (France) 2019 Paris–Roubaix Winner: (Belgium) Philippe Gilbert (Deceuninck–Quick-Step)
- April 16 – 21: 2019 Presidential Tour of Turkey Winner: (Austria) Felix Großschartner (Bora–Hansgrohe)
- April 21: (Netherlands) 2019 Amstel Gold Race Winner: (Netherlands) Mathieu van der Poel (Corendon–Circus)
- April 24: (Belgium) 2019 La Flèche Wallonne Winner: (France) Julian Alaphilippe (Deceuninck–Quick-Step)
- April 28: (Belgium) 2019 Liège–Bastogne–Liège Winner: (Denmark) Jakob Fuglsang (Astana Pro Team)
- April 30 – May 5: (Switzerland) 2019 Tour de Romandie Winner: (Slovenia) Primož Roglič (Team Jumbo–Visma)
- May 1: (Germany) 2019 Eschborn–Frankfurt Winner: (Germany) Pascal Ackermann (Bora–Hansgrohe)
- May 12 – 18: (United States) 2019 Tour of California Winner: (Slovenia) Tadej Pogačar (UAE Team Emirates)
- June 9 – 16: (France) 2019 Critérium du Dauphiné Winner: (Denmark) Jakob Fuglsang (Astana Pro Team)
- June 15 – 23: (Switzerland) 2019 Tour de Suisse Winner: (Colombia) Egan Bernal (Team Ineos)
- August 3: (Spain) 2019 Clásica de San Sebastián Winner: (Belgium) Remco Evenepoel (Deceuninck–Quick-Step)
- August 3 – 9: (Poland) 2019 Tour de Pologne Winner: (Russia) Pavel Sivakov (Team Ineos)
- August 4: (United Kingdom) 2019 RideLondon–Surrey Classic Winner: (Italy) Elia Viviani (Deceuninck–Quick-Step)
- August 12 – 18: (Belgium) / (Netherlands) 2019 BinckBank Tour Winner: (Belgium) Laurens De Plus (Team Jumbo–Visma)
- August 25: (Germany) 2019 EuroEyes Cyclassics Winner: (Italy) Elia Viviani (Deceuninck–Quick-Step)
- September 1: 2019 Bretagne Classic Ouest–France Winner: (Belgium) Sep Vanmarcke (EF Education First Pro Cycling)
- September 13: (Canada) 2019 Grand Prix Cycliste de Québec Winner: (Australia) Michael Matthews (Team Sunweb)
- September 15: (Canada) 2019 Grand Prix Cycliste de Montréal Winner: (Belgium) Greg Van Avermaet (CCC Team)
- October 12: (Italy) 2019 Il Lombardia Winner: (Netherlands) Bauke Mollema (Trek–Segafredo)
- October 17 – 22: (China) 2019 Tour of Guangxi Winner: (Spain) Enric Mas (Deceuninck–Quick-Step)

=== 2019 UCI Women's World Tour ===
- March 9: (Italy) 2019 Strade Bianche Women Winner: (Netherlands) Annemiek van Vleuten (Mitchelton–Scott)
- March 17: (Netherlands) 2019 Ronde van Drenthe Winner: (Italy) Marta Bastianelli (Team Virtu Cycling Women)
- March 24: (Italy) 2019 Trofeo Alfredo Binda-Comune di Cittiglio Winner: (Netherlands) Marianne Vos (CCC Liv)
- March 28: (Belgium) 2019 Three Days of Bruges–De Panne Winner: (Netherlands) Kirsten Wild (WNT–Rotor Pro Cycling)
- March 31: (Belgium) 2019 Gent–Wevelgem Winner: (Netherlands) Kirsten Wild (WNT–Rotor Pro Cycling)
- April 7: (Belgium) 2019 Tour of Flanders for Women Winner: (Italy) Marta Bastianelli (Team Virtu Cycling Women)
- April 21: (Netherlands) 2019 Amstel Gold Race Winner: (Poland) Katarzyna Niewiadoma (Canyon–SRAM)
- April 24: (Belgium) 2019 Flèche Wallonne Winner: (Netherlands) Anna van der Breggen (Boels–Dolmans)
- April 28: (Belgium) 2019 Liège–Bastogne–Liège Winner: (Netherlands) Annemiek van Vleuten (Mitchelton–Scott)
- May 9 – 11: (China) 2019 Tour of Chongming Island Winner: (Netherlands) Lorena Wiebes (Parkhotel Valkenburg Cycling Team)
- May 16 – 18: (United States) 2019 Tour of California Winner: (Netherlands) Anna van der Breggen (Boels–Dolmans)
- May 22 – 25: (Spain) 2019 Emakumeen Euskal Bira Winner: (Italy) Elisa Longo Borghini (Trek–Segafredo)
- June 10 – 15: (United Kingdom) 2019 The Women's Tour Winner: (United Kingdom) Lizzie Deignan (Trek–Segafredo)
- July 5 – 14: (Italy) 2019 Giro Rosa Winner: (Netherlands) Annemiek van Vleuten (Mitchelton–Scott)
- July 19: 2019 La Course by Le Tour de France Winner: (Netherlands) Marianne Vos (CCC Liv)
- August 3: (United Kingdom) Prudential RideLondon Classique Winner: (Netherlands) Lorena Wiebes (Parkhotel Valkenburg Cycling Team)
- August 17: Postnord UCI WWT Vårgårda WestSweden TTT Winners: Team Trek–Segafredo
- August 18: 2019 Postnord UCI WWT Vårgårda West Sweden Winner: (Italy) Marta Bastianelli (Team Virtu Cycling Women)
- August 22 – 25: 2019 Ladies Tour of Norway Winner: (Netherlands) Marianne Vos (CCC Liv)
- August 31: (France) GP de Plouay – Lorient Agglomération Trophée WNT Winner: (Netherlands) Anna van der Breggen (Boels–Dolmans)
- September 3 – 8: (Netherlands) 2019 Holland Ladies Tour Winner: (Luxembourg) Christine Majerus (Boels–Dolmans)
- September 14 & 15: (Spain) 2019 Madrid Challenge by la Vuelta Winner: (Germany) Lisa Brennauer (WNT–Rotor Pro Cycling)
- October 22: (China) Tour of Guangxi Women's WorldTour race Winner: (Australia) Chloe Hosking (Alé–Cipollini)

== Cycling – Track ==
=== International track cycling events ===
- August 2 – 7, 2018: 2018 UEC European Track Championships in (United Kingdom) Glasgow
  - Netherlands won the gold medal tally. Germany won the overall medal tally.
- August 15 – 19, 2018: 2018 UCI Junior Track Cycling World Championships in (Switzerland) Aigle
  - Germany and Italy won 4 gold medals each. Australia, Poland, and Russia won 9 overall medals each.
- August 21 – 26, 2018: 2018 UEC European U23 & Junior Track Championships in (Switzerland) Aigle
  - Italy won the gold medal tally. Russia won the overall medal tally.
- August 29 – September 2, 2018: 2018 Pan American Track Cycling Championships in Aguascalientes City
  - United States won the gold medal tally. Mexico won the overall medal tally.
- October 6 – 13, 2018: 2018 UCI Masters Track Cycling World Championships in (United States) Los Angeles
  - For detailed results, click here.
  - For the complete results book (483 pages in .pdf form), click here.
- October 10 – 13, 2018: 2019 Oceania Track Championships in Adelaide
  - Australia won both the gold and overall medal tallies.
- January 9 – 13: 2019 Asian Track Championships in (Indonesia) Jakarta
  - South Korea and Japan won 6 gold medals each. South Korea won the overall medal tally.
- February 27 – March 3: 2019 UCI Track Cycling World Championships in (Poland) Pruszków
  - Netherlands and Australia won 6 gold medals each. The Netherlands won the overall medal tally.

=== 2018–19 UCI Track Cycling World Cup ===
- October 19 – 21, 2018: TCWC #1 in (France) Saint-Quentin-en-Yvelines
  - Keirin winners: (Japan) Yuta Wakimoto (m) / (Netherlands) Laurine van Riessen (f)
  - Madison winners: Denmark (Lasse Norman Hansen & Michael Mørkøv) (m) / Denmark (Amalie Dideriksen & Julie Leth) (f)
  - Omnium winners: (Spain) Albert Torres (m) / (Netherlands) Kirsten Wild (f)
  - Points Race winners: (Germany) Moritz Malcharek (m) / (Italy) Maria Giulia Confalonieri (f)
  - Scratch Race winners: (Austria) Stefan Matzner (m) / (Australia) Ashlee Ankudinoff (f)
  - Sprint winners: (Australia) Matthew Glaetzer (m) / (Hong Kong) Lee Wai Sze (f)
  - Men's Team Pursuit winners: Denmark (Julius Johansen, Lasse Norman Hansen, Rasmus Pedersen, & Casper von Folsach)
  - Men's Team Sprint winners: Netherlands (Roy van den Berg, Jeffrey Hoogland, & Sam Ligtlee)
  - Women's Team Pursuit winners: Australia (Kristina Clonan, Ashlee Ankudinoff, Georgia Baker, & Macey Stewart)
  - Women's Team Sprint winners: Russia (Gazprom–RusVelo Team) (Daria Shmeleva & Anastasia Voynova)
- October 26 – 28, 2018: TCWC #2 in (Canada) Milton, Ontario
  - Keirin winners: (United Kingdom) Jason Kenny (m) / (United States) Madalyn Godby (f)
  - Madison winners: Denmark (Casper von Folsach & Julius Johansen) (m) / Great Britain (Katie Archibald & Elinor Barker) (f)
  - Omnium winners: (France) Benjamin Thomas (m) / (United Kingdom) Laura Kenny (f)
  - Scratch Race winners: (Ukraine) Vitaliy Hryniv (m) / (Russia) Aleksandra Goncharova (f)
  - Sprint winners: (Australia) Matthew Glaetzer (m) / (Hong Kong) Lee Wai Sze (f)
  - Men's Team Pursuit winners: Denmark (Casper von Folsach, Lasse Norman Hansen, Julius Johansen, & Rasmus Pedersen)
  - Men's Team Sprint winners: Netherlands (Nils van 't Hoenderdaal, Harrie Lavreysen, & Jeffrey Hoogland)
  - Women's Team Pursuit winners: Great Britain (Laura Kenny, Katie Archibald, Elinor Barker, & Ellie Dickinson)
  - Women's Team Sprint winners: Australia (Kaarle McCulloch & Stephanie Morton)
- November 30 – December 2, 2018: TCWC #3 in (Germany) Berlin
  - Keirin winners: (Netherlands) Matthijs Büchli (m) / (Netherlands) Laurine van Riessen (f)
  - Madison winners: Denmark (Lasse Norman Hansen & Casper von Folsach) (m) / Great Britain (Laura Kenny & Emily Nelson) (f)
  - Omnium winners: (Australia) Sam Welsford (m) / (United Kingdom) Katie Archibald (f)
  - Sprint winners: (Australia) Matthew Glaetzer (m) / (Australia) Stephanie Morton (f)
  - Men's Team Pursuit winners: Australia (Alexander Porter, Sam Welsford, Leigh Howard, & Kelland O'Brien)
  - Women's Team Pursuit winners: Great Britain (Katie Archibald, Laura Kenny, Emily Nelson, & Emily Kay)
  - Men's Team Sprint winners: Netherlands (Nils van 't Hoenderdaal, Harrie Lavreysen, & Jeffrey Hoogland)
  - Women's Team Sprint winners: Russia (Gazprom–RusVelo Team) (Daria Shmeleva & Anastasia Voynova)
  - Men's 1 km Time Trial winner: (Germany) Joachim Eilers
  - Women's 500 m Time Trial winner: (Ukraine) Olena Starikova
- December 14 – 16, 2018: TCWC #4 in (United Kingdom) London
  - Keirin winners: (Netherlands) Matthijs Büchli (m) / (Australia) Stephanie Morton (f)
  - Madison winners: Denmark (Julius Johansen & Casper von Folsach) (m) / Great Britain (Katie Archibald & Laura Kenny) (f)
  - Omnium winners: (United Kingdom) Matthew Walls (m) / (Netherlands) Kirsten Wild (f)
  - Sprint winners: (Netherlands) Harrie Lavreysen (m) / (Australia) Stephanie Morton (f)
  - Men's Team Pursuit winners: Great Britain (Huub Wattbike Test Team) (John Archibald, Daniel Bigham, Ashton Lambie, & Jonathan Wale)
  - Women's Team Pursuit winners: Great Britain (Katie Archibald, Ellie Dickinson, Neah Evans, & Laura Kenny)
  - Men's Team Sprint winners: Netherlands (Roy van den Berg, Harrie Lavreysen, & Matthijs Büchli)
  - Women's Team Sprint winners: China (Lin Junhong & Zhong Tianshi)
- January 18 – 20: TCWC #5 in Cambridge
  - Keirin winners: (New Zealand) Eddie Dawkins (m) / (Hong Kong) Lee Wai Sze (f)
  - Madison winners: New Zealand (Campbell Stewart & Aaron Gate) (m) / Belgium (Jolien D'Hoore & Lotte Kopecky) (f)
  - Omnium winners: (Switzerland) Claudio Imhof (m) / (Australia) Annette Edmondson (f)
  - Scratch Race winners: (Greece) Christos Volikakis (m) / (Italy) Martina Fidanza (f)
  - Sprint winners: (Australia) Nathan Hart (m) / (Hong Kong) Lee Wai Sze (f)
  - Men's Team Pursuit winners: New Zealand (Regan Gough, Campbell Stewart, Jordan Kerby, & Nicholas Kergozou)
  - Men's Team Sprint winners: New Zealand (Ethan Mitchell, Sam Webster, & Eddie Dawkins)
  - Women's Team Pursuit winners: New Zealand (Racquel Sheath, Bryony Botha, Rushlee Buchanan, & Kirstie James)
  - Women's Team Sprint winners: China (Holy Brother Cycling Team) (SONG Chaoru & BAO Shanju)
- January 25 – 27: TCWC #6 (final) in Hong Kong
  - Keirin winners: (Netherlands) Theo Bos (m) / (Hong Kong) Lee Wai Sze (f)
  - Madison winners: New Zealand (Thomas Sexton & Campbell Stewart) (m) / Netherlands (Kirsten Wild & Amy Pieters) (f)
  - Omnium winners: (Australia) Cameron Meyer (m) / (Netherlands) Kirsten Wild (f)
  - Scratch Race winners: (China) GUO Liang (m) / (Italy) Martina Fidanza (f)
  - Sprint winners: (Australia) Thomas Clarke (m) / (Hong Kong) Lee Wai Sze (f)
  - Men's Team Pursuit winners: Italy (Liam Bertazzo, Francesco Lamon, Filippo Ganna, & Davide Plebani)
  - Men's Team Sprint winners: Australia (Matthew Richardson, Thomas Clarke, & James Brister)
  - Women's Team Pursuit winners: Italy (Elisa Balsamo, Letizia Paternoster, Martina Alzini, & Marta Cavalli)
  - Women's Team Sprint winners: China (Lin Junhong & Zhong Tianshi)

=== National cycling events ===
Terauchi Daikichi Memorial Cup in (Japan) Tachikawa, Tokyo

- December 28: 2019 Young Grand Prix
  - (Japan) Takaharu Matsumoto (y)
- December 29: 2019 Girls' Grand Prix
  - (Japan) Aoi Kodama (f)
- December 30: 2019 Keirin Grand Prix
  - (Japan) Shintaro Sato (m)

== Cycling – Trials ==
=== International Trial cycling events ===
- October 4 – 6: 2019 UCI Trials European Championships in (Italy) Barga
  - Men's 20" winners: (Germany) Dominik Oswald (Elite) / (United Kingdom) Charlie Rolls (Junior)
  - Men's 26" winners: (United Kingdom) Jack Carthy (Elite) / (Germany) Oliver Widmann (Junior)
  - Women's Elite Open winner: (Germany) Nina Reichenbach
- November 6 – 10: UCI Trials World Championships in (China) Chengdu
  - Men's Junior 20" winner: (United Kingdom) Charlie Rolls
  - Men's Junior 26" winner: (Germany) Oliver Widmann
  - Women's Elite Open winner: (Germany) Nina Reichenbach

=== 2019 UCI Trials World Cup ===
- July 5 – 7: Trials WC #1 in (Austria) Salzburg
  - Men's Elite 20" winner: (Spain) Alejandro Montalvo Milla
  - Men's Elite 26" winner: (United Kingdom) Jack Carthy
  - Women's Elite Open winner: (Spain) Vera Baron Rodriguez
- August 23 – 25: Trials WC #2 in (Italy) Val di Sole
  - Men's Elite 20" winner: (Austria) Thomas Pechhacker
  - Men's Elite 26" winner: (United Kingdom) Jack Carthy
  - Women's Elite Open winner: (Germany) Nina Reichenbach
- October 11 – 13: Trials WC #3 in (Italy) Barga
  - Men's Elite 20" winner: (Spain) Borja Conejos Vazquez
  - Men's Elite 26" winner: (United Kingdom) Jack Carthy
  - Women's Elite Open winner: (Spain) Vera Baron Rodriguez
