= 2022 UCI BMX Racing World Cup =

- Sport: BMX racing
- Hosts: (United Kingdom) Glasgow (Netherlands) Papendal (Colombia) Bogotá (2 times)
- Duration: 28 May – 2 October
- Men Elite: (gold) (France) Sylvain André; (silver) (United States) Cameron Wood; (bronze) (Australia) Izaac Kennedy
- Women Elite: (gold) (Netherlands) Laura Smulders; (silver) (Switzerland) Zoé Claessens; (bronze) (United Kingdom) Beth Shriever
- Men Under 23: (gold) (France) Léo Garoyan; (silver) (New Zealand) Rico Bearman; (bronze) (France) Tatyan Lui-Hin-Tsan
- Women Under 23: (gold) (Latvia) Veronika Stūriška; (silver) (Belgium) Aiko Gommers; (bronze) (Switzerland) Thalya Burford

Seasons
- ← 2021 2023 →

The 2022 UCI BMX Racing World Cup is the annual edition of the UCI BMX Racing World Cup in the Olympic bmx racing event, governed by the UCI.

== Calendar ==
The calendar for the 2022 UCI BMX Racing World Cup include 4 stages (8 rounds).

Date	Location	Ref.
28–29 May	Glasgow, United Kingdom	
11–12 June	Papendal, Netherlands	
24–25 September	Bogotá, Colombia	
1–2 October	Bogotá, Colombia	

== Results ==
=== Men's elite ===
Stage	Venue	1st place, gold medalist(s)	2nd place, silver medalist(s)	3rd place, bronze medalist(s)
1	(United Kingdom) Glasgow	Diego Arboleda (COL)	Sylvain André (FRA)	Kye Whyte (GBR)
2	(United Kingdom) Glasgow	Jérémy Rencurel (FRA)	Sylvain André (FRA)	Izaac Kennedy (AUS)
3	(Netherlands) Papendal	Sylvain André (FRA)	Jérémy Rencurel (FRA)	Izaac Kennedy (AUS)
4	(Netherlands) Papendal	Romain Mahieu (FRA)	Cameron Wood (USA)	Carlos Ramírez (COL)
5	(Colombia) Bogotá	Niek Kimmann (NED)	Cameron Wood (USA)	Sylvain André (FRA)
6	(Colombia) Bogotá	Cameron Wood (USA)	Joris Daudet (FRA)	Izaac Kennedy (AUS)
7	(Colombia) Bogotá	Joris Daudet (FRA)	Kye Whyte (GBR)	Alfredo Campo (ECU)
8	(Colombia) Bogotá	Joris Daudet (FRA)	Izaac Kennedy (AUS)	Cameron Wood (USA)

=== Women's elite ===
Stage	Venue	1st place, gold medalist(s)	2nd place, silver medalist(s)	3rd place, bronze medalist(s)
1	(United Kingdom) Glasgow	Laura Smulders (NED)	Zoé Claessens (SUI)	Judy Baauw (NED)
2	(United Kingdom) Glasgow	Laura Smulders (NED)	Beth Shriever (GBR)	Saya Sakakibara (AUS)
3	(Netherlands) Papendal	Zoé Claessens (SUI)	Laura Smulders (NED)	Felicia Stancil (USA)
4	(Netherlands) Papendal	Zoé Claessens (SUI)	Laura Smulders (NED)	Beth Shriever (GBR)
5	(Colombia) Bogotá	Beth Shriever (GBR)	Laura Smulders (NED)	Alise Willoughby (USA)
6	(Colombia) Bogotá	Laura Smulders (NED)	Alise Willoughby (USA)	Lauren Reynolds (AUS)
7	(Colombia) Bogotá	Laura Smulders (NED)	Alise Willoughby (USA)	Zoé Claessens (SUI)
8	(Colombia) Bogotá	Mariana Pajón (COL)	Merel Smulders (NED)	Zoé Claessens (SUI)

=== Men under 23 ===
Stage	Venue	1st place, gold medalist(s)	2nd place, silver medalist(s)	3rd place, bronze medalist(s)
1	(United Kingdom) Glasgow	Dylan Gobert (FRA)	Léo Garoyan (FRA)	Hugo Marszałek (FRA)
2	(United Kingdom) Glasgow	Rico Bearman (NZL)	Léo Garoyan (FRA)	Tatyan Lui-Hin-Tsan (FRA)
3	(Netherlands) Papendal	Léo Garoyan (FRA)	Dylan Gobert (FRA)	Magnus Dyhre (DEN)
4	(Netherlands) Papendal	Léo Garoyan (FRA)	Dylan Gobert (FRA)	Pierre Geisse (FRA)
5	(Colombia) Bogotá	Léo Garoyan (FRA)	Cristhian Castro (ECU)	Hugo Marszałek (FRA)
6	(Colombia) Bogotá	Mauricio Molina (CHI)	Tatyan Lui-Hin-Tsan (FRA)	Matéo Colsenet (FRA)
7	(Colombia) Bogotá	Léo Garoyan (FRA)	Asuma Nakai (JPN)	Tatyan Lui-Hin-Tsan (FRA)
8	(Colombia) Bogotá	Rico Bearman (NZL)	Mauricio Molina (CHI)	Asuma Nakai (JPN)

=== Women under 23 ===
Stage	Venue	1st place, gold medalist(s)	2nd place, silver medalist(s)	3rd place, bronze medalist(s)
1	(United Kingdom) Glasgow	Malene Kejlstrup (DEN)	Molly Simpson (CAN)	Thalya Burford (SUI)
2	(United Kingdom) Glasgow	Thalya Burford (SUI)	Aiko Gommers (BEL)	Kanami Tanno (JPN)
3	(Netherlands) Papendal	Thalya Burford (SUI)	Malene Kejlstrup (DEN)	Molly Simpson (CAN)
4	(Netherlands) Papendal	Molly Simpson (CAN)	Thalya Burford (SUI)	Malene Kejlstrup (DEN)
5	(Colombia) Bogotá	Veronika Stūriška (LAT)	McKenzie Gayheart (USA)	Emily Hutt (GBR)
6	(Colombia) Bogotá	Veronika Stūriška (LAT)	McKenzie Gayheart (USA)	Aiko Gommers (BEL)
7	(Colombia) Bogotá	Veronika Stūriška (LAT)	Leila Walker (NZL)	McKenzie Gayheart (USA)
8	(Colombia) Bogotá	Leila Walker (NZL)	Veronika Stūriška (LAT)	McKenzie Gayheart (USA)

== Standings ==
Standings after round 8 in Bogotá

=== Men elite ===
Pos.	Racer	Points
1	Sylvain André (FRA)	2537
2	Cameron Wood (USA)	2249
3	Izaac Kennedy (AUS)	2117
4	Kye Whyte (GBR)	1873
5	Jérémy Rencurel (FRA)	1839
6	Diego Arboleda (COL)	1704
7	Joris Daudet (FRA)	1565
8	Carlos Ramírez (COL)	1479
9	Romain Mayet (FRA)	1099
10	Cédric Butti (SUI)	1075

=== Women elite ===
Pos.	Racer	Points
1	Laura Smulders (NED)	3608
2	Zoé Claessens (SUI)	2858
3	Beth Shriever (GBR)	2181
4	Mariana Pajón (COL)	1640
5	Manon Veenstra (NED)	1588
6	Lauren Reynolds (AUS)	1514
7	Merel Smulders (NED)	1485
8	Camille Maire (FRA)	1424
9	Felicia Stancil (USA)	1297
10	Judy Baauw (NED)	1296

=== Men Under 23 ===
Pos.	Racer	Points
1	Léo Garoyan (FRA)	1063
2	Rico Bearman (NZL)	834
3	Tatyan Lui-Hin-Tsan (FRA)	733
4	Dylan Gobert (FRA)	701
5	Hugo Marszałek (FRA)	555
6	Mauricio Molina (CHI)	534
7	Asuma Nakai (JPN)	444
8	Cristhian Castro (ECU)	399
9	Magnus Dyhre (DEN)	363
10	Wannes Magdelijns (BEL)	325

=== Women Under 23 ===
Pos.	Racer	Points
1	Veronika Stūriška (LAT)	853
2	Aiko Gommers (BEL)	641
3	Thalya Burford (SUI)	594
4	Kanami Tanno (JPN)	573
5	Francesca Cingolani (ITA)	534
6	McKenzie Gayheart (USA)	528
7	Malene Kejlstrup (DEN)	486
8	Molly Simpson (CAN)	483
9	Leila Walker (NZL)	429
10	Emily Hutt (GBR)	415

== Medal summary ==
Ranking by round

Rank	Nation	Gold	Silver	Bronze	Total
1	France (FRA)	10	9	7	26
2	Netherlands (NED)	5	4	1	10
3	Switzerland (SUI)	4	2	3	9
4	Latvia (LAT)	3	1	0	4
4	New Zealand (NZL)	3	1	0	4
6	Colombia (COL)	2	0	1	3
7	United States (USA)	1	6	5	12
8	Great Britain (GBR)	1	2	3	6
9	Denmark (DEN)	1	1	2	4
10	Canada (CAN)	1	1	1	3
11	Chile (CHI)	1	1	0	2
12	Australia (AUS)	0	1	5	6
13	Japan (JPN)	0	1	2	3
14	Belgium (BEL)	0	1	1	2
14	Ecuador (ECU)	0	1	1	2
Totals (15 entries)		32	32	32	96
