= 2025 UCI BMX Racing World Cup =

- Sport: BMX racing
- Hosts: (France) Sarrians (Netherlands) Papendal (Argentina) Santiago del Estero
- Duration: 14 June – 21 September
- Men Elite: (gold) (France) Arthur Pilard; (silver) (France) Sylvain André; (bronze) (United States) Cameron Wood
- Women Elite: (gold) (Australia) Saya Sakakibara; (silver) (Netherlands) Laura Smulders; (bronze) (Canada) Molly Simpson
- Men Under 23: (gold) (Netherlands) Jason Noordam; (silver) (France) Mathis Jacquet; (bronze) (Australia) Joshua Jolly
- Women Under 23: (gold) (Netherlands) Michelle Wissing; (silver) (New Zealand) Lily Greenough; (bronze) (United Kingdom) Emily Hutt

Seasons
- ← 2024 2026 →

The 2025 UCI BMX Racing World Cup is the annual edition of the UCI BMX Racing World Cup in the Olympic BMX racing event, governed by the UCI.

== Calendar ==
The calendar for the 2025 UCI BMX Racing World Cup include 3 stages (6 rounds).

Date	Location	Ref.
14–15 June	Sarrians, France	
21–22 June	Papendal, Netherlands	
20–21 September	Santiago del Estero, Argentina	

== Results ==
=== Men's elite ===
Stage	Venue	1st place, gold medalist(s)	2nd place, silver medalist(s)	3rd place, bronze medalist(s)
1	(France) Sarrians	Arthur Pilard (FRA)	Izaac Kennedy (AUS)	Sylvain André (FRA)
2	(France) Sarrians	Sylvain André (FRA)	Arthur Pilard (FRA)	Izaac Kennedy (AUS)
3	(Netherlands) Papendal	Rico Bearman (NZL)	Mitchel Schotman (NED)	Sylvain André (FRA)
4	(Netherlands) Papendal	Ross Cullen (GBR)	Cameron Wood (USA)	Sylvain André (FRA)
5	(Argentina) Santiago del Estero	Arthur Pilard (FRA)	Gonzalo Molina (ARG)	Cameron Wood (USA)
6	(Argentina) Santiago del Estero	Arthur Pilard (FRA)	Eddy Clerté (FRA)	Gonzalo Molina (ARG)

=== Women's elite ===
Stage	Venue	1st place, gold medalist(s)	2nd place, silver medalist(s)	3rd place, bronze medalist(s)
1	(France) Sarrians	Zoé Claessens (SUI)	Saya Sakakibara (AUS)	Molly Simpson (CAN)
2	(France) Sarrians	Molly Simpson (CAN)	Beth Shriever (GBR)	Daleny Vaughn (USA)
3	(Netherlands) Papendal	Laura Smulders (NED)	Saya Sakakibara (AUS)	Zoé Claessens (SUI)
4	(Netherlands) Papendal	Beth Shriever (GBR)	Saya Sakakibara (AUS)	Molly Simpson (CAN)
5	(Argentina) Santiago del Estero	Saya Sakakibara (AUS)	Zoé Claessens (SUI)	Laura Smulders (NED)
6	(Argentina) Santiago del Estero	Saya Sakakibara (AUS)	Laura Smulders (NED)	Beth Shriever (GBR)

=== Men under 23 ===
Stage	Venue	1st place, gold medalist(s)	2nd place, silver medalist(s)	3rd place, bronze medalist(s)
1	(France) Sarrians	Jason Noordam (NED)	Alexis Pieczanowsky (FRA)	Jesse Asmus (AUS)
2	(France) Sarrians	Jason Noordam (NED)	Jesse Asmus (AUS)	Pierre Geisse (FRA)
3	(Netherlands) Papendal	Jason Noordam (NED)	Casper Pipers (NED)	Mathis Jacquet (FRA)
4	(Netherlands) Papendal	Joshua Jolly (AUS)	Jason Noordam (NED)	Casper Pipers (NED)
5	(Argentina) Santiago del Estero	Mathis Jacquet (FRA)	Federico Capello (ARG)	Jason Noordam (NED)
6	(Argentina) Santiago del Estero	Jason Noordam (NED)	Evan Oliviera (FRA)	Lucas Zimmermann (BRA)

=== Women under 23 ===
Stage	Venue	1st place, gold medalist(s)	2nd place, silver medalist(s)	3rd place, bronze medalist(s)
1	(France) Sarrians	Michelle Wissing (NED)	Marie Favrel (FRA)	Emily Hutt (GBR)
2	(France) Sarrians	Michelle Wissing (NED)	Emily Hutt (GBR)	Lily Greenough (NZL)
3	(Netherlands) Papendal	Michelle Wissing (NED)	Renske van Santvoort (NED)	Lily Greenough (NZL)
4	(Netherlands) Papendal	Michelle Wissing (NED)	Renske van Santvoort (NED)	Doménica Mora (ECU)
5	(Argentina) Santiago del Estero	Michelle Wissing (NED)	Lily Greenough (NZL)	Alexis Alden (USA)
6	(Argentina) Santiago del Estero	Aleksandra Simashkina (AIN)	Derin Merten (USA)	Francesca Cingolani (ITA)

== Standings ==
Standings after round 6 in Santiago del Estero.

=== Men elite ===
Pos.	Racer	Points
1	Arthur Pilard (FRA)	2358
2	Sylvain André (FRA)	2130
3	Cameron Wood (USA)	1723
4	Eddy Clerté (FRA)	1442
5	Rico Bearman (NZL)	1117
6	Gonzalo Molina (ARG)	1085
7	Simon Marquart (SUI)	982
8	Izaac Kennedy (AUS)	974
9	Ross Cullen (GBR)	865
10	Jaymio Brink (NED)	838

=== Women elite ===
Pos.	Racer	Points
1	Saya Sakakibara (AUS)	2563
2	Laura Smulders (NED)	2026
3	Molly Simpson (CAN)	1881
4	Zoé Claessens (SUI)	1859
5	Beth Shriever (GBR)	1777
6	Malene Kejlstrup (DEN)	1379
7	Daleny Vaughn (USA)	1156
8	Teya Rufus (AUS)	899
9	Payton Ridenour (USA)	857
10	Manon Veenstra (NED)	711

=== Men Under 23 ===
Pos.	Racer	Points
1	Jason Noordam (NED)	924
2	Mathis Jacquet (FRA)	513
3	Joshua Jolly (AUS)	367
4	Alexis Pieczanowsky (FRA)	354
5	Jesse Asmus (AUS)	281
6	Casper Pipers (NED)	264
7	Federico Capello (ARG)	263
8	Clément Rocherieux (FRA)	253
9	Tim Goossens (NED)	233
10	Pierre Geisse (FRA)	225

=== Women Under 23 ===
Pos.	Racer	Points
1	Michelle Wissing (NED)	915
2	Lily Greenough (NZL)	588
3	Emily Hutt (GBR)	494
4	Renske van Santvoort (NED)	435
5	Alexis Alden (USA)	416
6	Aleksandra Simashkina (AIN)	382
7	Marie Favrel (FRA)	365
8	Doménica Mora (ECU)	347
9	Derin Merten (USA)	332
10	Veronika Stūriška (LAT)	324

== Medal summary ==
Ranking by round

Rank	Nation	Gold	Silver	Bronze	Total
1	Netherlands (NED)	10	6	3	19
2	France (FRA)	5	5	5	15
3	Australia (AUS)	3	5	2	10
4	Great Britain (GBR)	2	2	2	6
5	New Zealand (NZL)	1	1	2	4
6	Switzerland (SUI)	1	1	1	3
7	Canada (CAN)	1	0	2	3
8	Individual Neutral Athletes (AIN)	1	0	0	1
9	United States (USA)	0	2	3	5
10	Argentina (ARG)	0	2	1	3
11	Brazil (BRA)	0	0	1	1
11	Ecuador (ECU)	0	0	1	1
11	Italy (ITA)	0	0	1	1
Totals (13 entries)		24	24	24	72
