= UCI BMX Racing World Cup =

UCI BMX Racing World Cup is a series of events for BMX racing (bicycle motocross) held under the regulations of the Union Cycliste Internationale (UCI), the sport's international governing body.

== Seasons ==
=== Men's Elite winners ===
Event	Gold	Points	Silver	Points	Bronze	Points
2003	Robert de Wilde (NED)	—N/a	Robbie Miranda (USA)	—N/a	Michal Prokop (CZE)	—N/a
2004	Derek Betcher (USA)	—N/a	Mike Day (USA)	—N/a	Michal Prokop (CZE)	—N/a
2005	Robert de Wilde (NED)	32 points	Randy Stumpfhauser (USA)	26 points	Cristian Becerine (ARG)	18 points
2006	Donny Robinson (USA)	31 points	Michal Prokop (CZE)	31 points	Mike Day (USA)	21 points
2007	Robert de Wilde (NED)	46 points	Donny Robinson (USA)	35 points	Damien Godet (FRA)	32 points
2008	Donny Robinson (USA)	63 points	David Herman (USA)	50 points	Kyle Bennett (USA)	46 points
2009	Sam Willoughby (AUS)	672 points	Ivo van der Putten (NED)	514 points	Donny Robinson (USA)	479 points
2010	Māris Štrombergs (LAT)	787 points	Sam Willoughby (AUS)	656 points	Connor Fields (USA)	586 points
2011	Joris Daudet (FRA)	631 points	Marc Willers (NZL)	504 points	Raymon van der Biezen (NED)	497 points
2012	Sam Willoughby (AUS)	743 points	Connor Fields (USA)	722 points	Twan van Gendt (NED)	512 points
2013	Connor Fields (USA)	790 points	Jelle van Gorkom (NED)	708 points	Liam Phillips (GBR)	605 points
2014	Liam Phillips (GBR)	710 points	Anthony Dean (AUS)	610 points	Twan van Gendt (NED)	570 points
2015	Liam Phillips (GBR)	865 points	Niek Kimmann (NED)	735 points	Amidou Mir (FRA)	610 points
2016	Corben Sharrah (USA)	855 points	David Graf (SUI)	600 points	Māris Štrombergs (LAT)	560 points
2017	Sylvain André (FRA)	645 points	Connor Fields (USA)	620 points	Tory Nyhaug (CAN)	535 points
2018	Niek Kimmann (NED)	975 points	Joris Daudet (FRA)	900 points	Sylvain André (FRA)	815 points
2019	Niek Kimmann (NED)	1180 points	Alfredo Campo (ECU)	890 points	David Graf (SUI)	820 points
2020	Connor Fields (USA)	400 points	Anthony Dean (AUS)	300 points	Carlos Ramírez (COL)	265 points
2021	Simon Marquart (SUI)	740 points	Carlos Ramírez (COL)	675 points	Joris Daudet (FRA)	640 points
2022	Sylvain André (FRA)	2537 points	Cameron Wood (USA)	2249 points	Izaac Kennedy (AUS)	2117 points
2023	Romain Mahieu (FRA)	3543 points	Joris Daudet (FRA)	3094 points	Diego Arboleda (COL)	2159 points
2024	Izaac Kennedy (AUS)	1787 points	Cédric Butti (SUI)	1764 points	Niek Kimmann (NED)	1456 points
2025	Arthur Pilard (FRA)	2358 points	Sylvain André (FRA)	2130 points	Cameron Wood (USA)	1723 points
2026	Jaymio Brink (NED)	2150 points	Arthur Pilard (FRA)	2040 points	Jérémy Rencurel (FRA)	1873 points

=== Men's U23 winners ===
Event	Gold	Points	Silver	Points	Bronze	Points
2021	Asuma Nakai (JPN)	810 points	Wannes Magdelijns (BEL)	500 points	Cristhian Castro (ECU)	485 points
2022	Léo Garoyan (FRA)	1063 points	Rico Bearman (NZL)	834 points	Tatyan Lui-Hin-Tsan (FRA)	733 points
2023	Rico Bearman (NZL)	1288 points	Matéo Colsenet (FRA)	956 points	Thomas Maturano (ARG)	599 points
2024	Oliver Moran (AUS)	719 points	Bennett Greenough (NZL)	622 points	Jesse Asmus (AUS)	527 points
2025	Jason Noordam (NED)	924 points	Mathis Jacquet (FRA)	513 points	Joshua Jolly (AUS)	367 points
2026	Clément Rocherieux (FRA)	1229 points	Pierre Geisse (FRA)	869 points	Matteo Faure (FRA)	865 points

=== Women's Elite winners ===
Event	Gold	Points	Silver	Points	Bronze	Points
2007	Laëtitia Le Corguillé (FRA)	30 points	Gabriela Díaz (ARG)	27 points	Sarah Walker (NZL)	24 points
2008	Arielle Martin (USA)	42 points	Laëtitia Le Corguillé (FRA)	31 points	Sarah Walker (NZL)	29 points
2009	Laëtitia Le Corguillé (FRA)	660 points	Eva Ailloud (FRA)	570 points	Arielle Martin (USA)	463 points
2010	Laëtitia Le Corguillé (FRA)	679 points	Caroline Buchanan (AUS)	512 points	Sarah Walker (NZL)	460 points
2011	Sarah Walker (NZL)	700 points	Magalie Pottier (FRA)	571 points	Mariana Pajón (COL)	527 points
2012	Caroline Buchanan (AUS)	780 points	Magalie Pottier (FRA)	587 points	Alise Willoughby (USA)	524 points
2013	Mariana Pajón (COL)	775 points	Arielle Martin (USA)	688 points	Laura Smulders (NED)	635 points
2014	Caroline Buchanan (AUS)	925 points	Mariana Pajón (COL)	760 points	Laura Smulders (NED)	725 points
2015	Mariana Pajón (COL)	965 points	Stefany Hernández (VEN)	875 points	Alise Willoughby (USA)	825 points
2016	Laura Smulders (NED)	985 points	Brooke Crain (USA)	750 points	Simone Christensen (DEN)	680 points
2017	Laura Smulders (NED)	790 points	Mariana Pajón (COL)	735 points	Simone Christensen (DEN)	650 points
2018	Laura Smulders (NED)	1080 points	Saya Sakakibara (AUS)	785 points	Judy Baauw (NED)	780 points
2019	Laura Smulders (NED)	1270 points	Felicia Stancil (USA)	925 points	Alise Willoughby (USA)	910 points
2020	Alise Willoughby (USA)	300 points	Saya Sakakibara (AUS)	230 points	Manon Valentino (FRA)	190 points
2021	Mariana Pajón (COL)	815 points	Laura Smulders (NED)	770 points	Felicia Stancil (USA)	705 points
2022	Laura Smulders (NED)	3608 points	Zoé Claessens (SUI)	2858 points	Beth Shriever (GBR)	2181 points
2023	Saya Sakakibara (AUS)	3775 points	Beth Shriever (GBR)	3044 points	Laura Smulders (NED)	2680 points
2024	Saya Sakakibara (AUS)	2860 points	Manon Veenstra (NED)	1996 points	Alise Willoughby (USA)	1880 points
2025	Saya Sakakibara (AUS)	2563 points	Laura Smulders (NED)	2026 points	Molly Simpson (CAN)	1881 points
2026	Laura Smulders (NED)	3721 points	Beth Shriever (GBR)	3623 points	Zoé Claessens (SUI)	3199 points

=== Women's U23 winners ===
Event	Gold	Points	Silver	Points	Bronze	Points
2021	Thalya Burford (SUI)	970 points	Léa Brindjonc (FRA)	710 points	Jui Yabuta (JPN)	480 points
2022	Veronika Stūriška (LAT)	853 points	Aiko Gommers (BEL)	641 points	Thalya Burford (SUI)	594 points
2023	Tessa Martinez (FRA)	976 points	Veronika Stūriška (LAT)	862 points	Ava Corley (USA)	787 points
2024	Teya Rufus (AUS)	849 points	Isabell May (AUS)	651 points	Veronika Stūriška (LAT)	428 points
2025	Michelle Wissing (NED)	915 points	Lily Greenough (NZL)	588 points	Emily Hutt (GBR)	494 points
2026	Freia Challis (GBR)	1334 points	Derin Merten (USA)	747 points	Isabella Schramm (AUS)	700 points

== Medal summary ==
Ranking by seasons (2003–2025)

Rank	Nation	Gold	Silver	Bronze	Total
1	Netherlands (NED)	12	6	8	26
2	France (FRA)	10	10	6	26
3	Australia (AUS)	10	7	3	20
4	United States (USA)	8	11	12	31
5	Colombia (COL)	3	3	3	9
6	New Zealand (NZL)	2	4	3	9
7	Switzerland (SUI)	2	3	2	7
8	Great Britain (GBR)	2	1	3	6
9	Latvia (LAT)	2	1	2	5
10	Japan (JPN)	1	0	1	2
11	Belgium (BEL)	0	2	0	2
12	Argentina (ARG)	0	1	2	3
12	Czech Republic (CZE)	0	1	2	3
14	Ecuador (ECU)	0	1	1	2
15	Venezuela (VEN)	0	1	0	1
16	Canada (CAN)	0	0	2	2
16	Denmark (DEN)	0	0	2	2
Totals (17 entries)		52	52	52	156

=== Riders ===
The following table shows the total number of all medals (By rounds 2003–2025).

==== Men's ====
Rank	Nation	Gold	Silver	Bronze	Total

==== Women's ====
Rank	Nation	Gold	Silver	Bronze	Total
1	(Netherlands) Laura Smulders	28	11	9	48
2	(Colombia) Mariana Pajón	14	8	6	28
3	(Australia) Saya Sakakibara	12	10	3	25
4	(Australia) Caroline Buchanan	10	3	2	15
5	(United Kingdom) Shanaze Reade	8	2	0	10
6	(United Kingdom) Beth Shriever	7	4	3	14
7	(France) Laëtitia Le Corguillé	7	4	2	13
8	(United States) Alise Willoughby	5	17	13	35
9	(Switzerland) Zoé Claessens	5	5	4	14
10	(New Zealand) Sarah Walker	4	4	2	10
