= 2025 UCI BMX World Championships =

Cycling championships in Copenhagen, Denmark

- Venue: Københavns BMX Klub
- Location: Amager, Copenhagen, Denmark
- Dates: 2 to 3 August 2025

The 2025 UCI BMX World Championships were held from 2 to 3 August 2025 in Copenhagen, Denmark.

== Medal summary ==
=== Elite events ===
Event	Gold		Silver		Bronze	
Men	Arthur Pilard; France	32.500	Izaac Kennedy; Australia	32.985 (+0.485)	Eddy Clerté; France	33.108 (+0.608)
Women	Beth Shriever; Great Britain	35.614	Saya Sakakibara; Australia	36.744 (+1.130)	Judy Baauw; Netherlands	37.223 (+1.609)

=== U23 events ===
Event	Gold		Silver		Bronze	
Men	Alexis Pieczanowsky; France	32.867	Joshua Jolly; Australia	33.541 (+0.674)	Jason Noordam; Netherlands	33.622 (+0.755)
Women	Michelle Wissing; Netherlands	37.378	Renske van Santvoort; Netherlands	37.998 (+0.620)	Marie Favrel; France	38.636 (+0.258)

=== Junior events ===
Event	Gold		Silver		Bronze	
Men	Evan Oliviera; France	34.015	Clément Rocherieux; France	34.405 (+0.390)	Lucas Zhou; Canada	35.597 (+1.582)
Women	Lily Greenough; New Zealand	38.130	Elsa Rendall Todd; Great Britain	38.401 (+0.271)	Alexis Alden; United States	39.470 (+1.340)

== Medal table ==
* Host nation (Denmark)

Rank	Nation	Gold	Silver	Bronze	Total
1	France	3	1	2	6
2	Netherlands	1	1	2	4
3	Great Britain	1	1	0	2
4	New Zealand	1	0	0	1
5	Australia	0	3	0	3
6	Canada	0	0	1	1
6	United States	0	0	1	1
Totals (7 entries)		6	6	6	18
