= Laëtitia Le Corguillé =

French cyclist

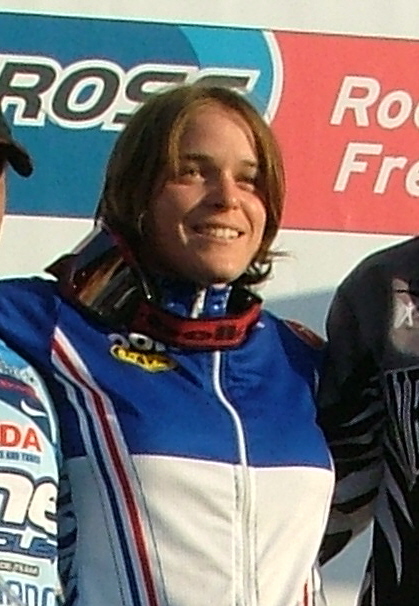

Personal information
- Full name: Laëtitia Le Corguillé
- Born: 29 July 1986 (age 40) Saint-Brieuc, France

Cycling career
- Sport: Cycling
- Discipline: BMX racing
- Role: Rider
Medal record
Women's BMX racing
Representing France
Event	1st	2nd	3rd
Olympic Games	0	1	0
World Championships	1	0	1
World Junior Championships	0	1	0
World Cup	3	1	0
World Cup rounds	7	4	2
Total	11	7	3
Olympic Games
Silver medal – second place	2008 Beijing	BMX racing
World Championships
Gold medal – first place	2006 São Paulo	BMX cruiser
Bronze medal – third place	2005 Paris	BMX racing
World Cup
Gold medal – first place	2007	BMX racing
Gold medal – first place	2009	BMX racing
Gold medal – first place	2010	BMX racing
Silver medal – second place	2008	BMX racing
World Junior Championships
Silver medal – second place	2004 Valkenswaard	BMX racing

Laëtitia Le Corguillé (born 29 July 1986 in Saint-Brieuc) is a French BMX racer and Olympic athlete who won the silver medal in BMX at the 2008 Beijing Olympic Games.

She began to cycle BMX bikes in 1991, following the example of her older brother Emeric Le Corguillé. In 2005, Le Courguillé joined the division of France BMX located in Aix-en-Provence to participate in an intensive training programme in advance of the 2008 Olympic Games. At the 2008 Games, the first time for BMX to be an Olympic sport, she took the silver medal behind her compatriot Anne-Caroline Chausson and ahead of British woman Shanaze Reade. At the 2012 Olympic Games, she finished fourth in the final.
