= 2023 UCI BMX World Championships =

- Location: (United Kingdom) Glasgow, Scotland
- Dates: 12 to 13 August 2023

The 2023 UCI BMX World Championships was held from 12 to 13 August 2023 in Glasgow, Scotland.

== Medal summary ==
=== Elite events ===
Event	Gold		Silver		Bronze	
Men	Romain Mahieu; France	33.189	Arthur Pilard; France	33.331	Joris Daudet; France	33.543
Women	Beth Shriever; Great Britain	36.577	Laura Smulders; Netherlands	36.957	Alise Willoughby; United States	37.336

=== U23 events ===
Event	Gold		Silver		Bronze	
Men	Filib Steiner; Switzerland	33.197	Mateo Colsenet; France	33.749	Rico Bearman; New Zealand	34.120
Women	Tessa Martinez; France	38.828	Emily Hutt; Great Britain	38.945	Megan Williams; New Zealand	39.064

=== Junior events ===
Event	Gold		Silver		Bronze	
Men	Thomas Maturano; Argentina	35.133	Federico Capello; Argentina	35.805	Tommaso Frizzarin; Italy	36.129
Women	Veronika Stūriška; Latvia	37.457	Sienna Pal; Australia	37.931	Ava Corley; United States	39.427

== Medal table ==
* Host nation (Great Britain)

Rank	Nation	Gold	Silver	Bronze	Total
1	France (FRA)	2	2	1	5
2	Argentina (ARG)	1	1	0	2
2	Great Britain (GBR)*	1	1	0	2
4	Latvia (LAT)	1	0	0	1
4	Switzerland (SUI)	1	0	0	1
6	Australia (AUS)	0	1	0	1
6	Netherlands (NED)	0	1	0	1
8	New Zealand (NZL)	0	0	2	2
8	United States (USA)	0	0	2	2
10	Italy (ITA)	0	0	1	1
Totals (10 entries)		6	6	6	18
