= Cameron Wood =

Cameron Wood may refer to:

- Cameron Wood (footballer)
- Cameron Wood (cyclist)
