= Amidou Mir =

French BMX rider (born 1995)

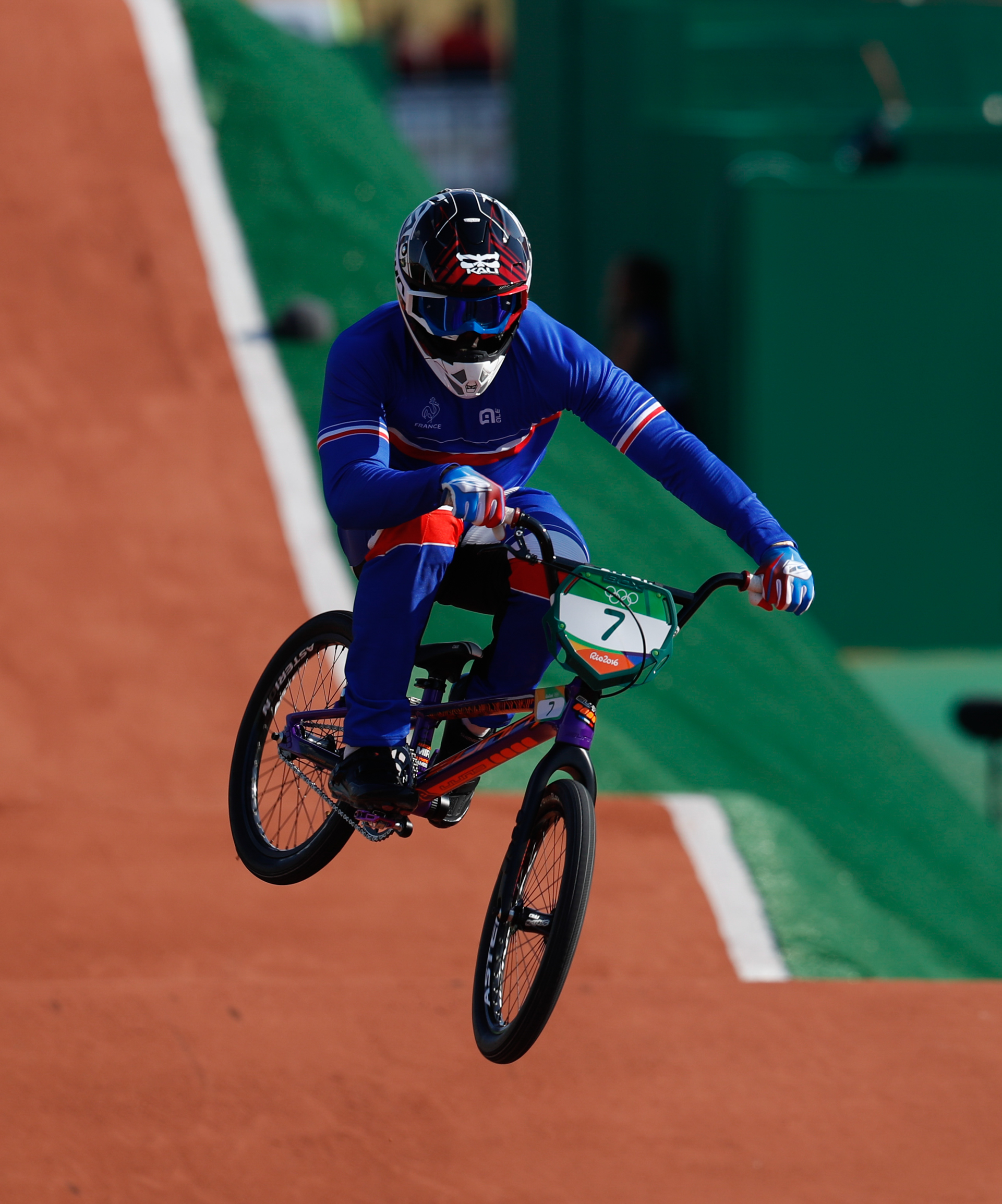
- Amidou Mir at the 2016 Olympics

Personal information
- Born: 1 January 1995 (age 31)

Cycling career
- Sport: Cycling
- Current team: France
- Discipline: BMX racing
- Role: Rider
Medal record
Men's BMX racing
Representing France
World Cup
Bronze medal – third place	2015	BMX racing

Amidou Mir (born 1 January 1995) is a French male BMX rider, representing his nation at international competitions. He competed in the time trial event at the 2015 UCI BMX World Championships, and won bronze at the 2015 UCI BMX Racing World Cup.
