= Arthur Pilard =

French BMX cyclist (born 1996)

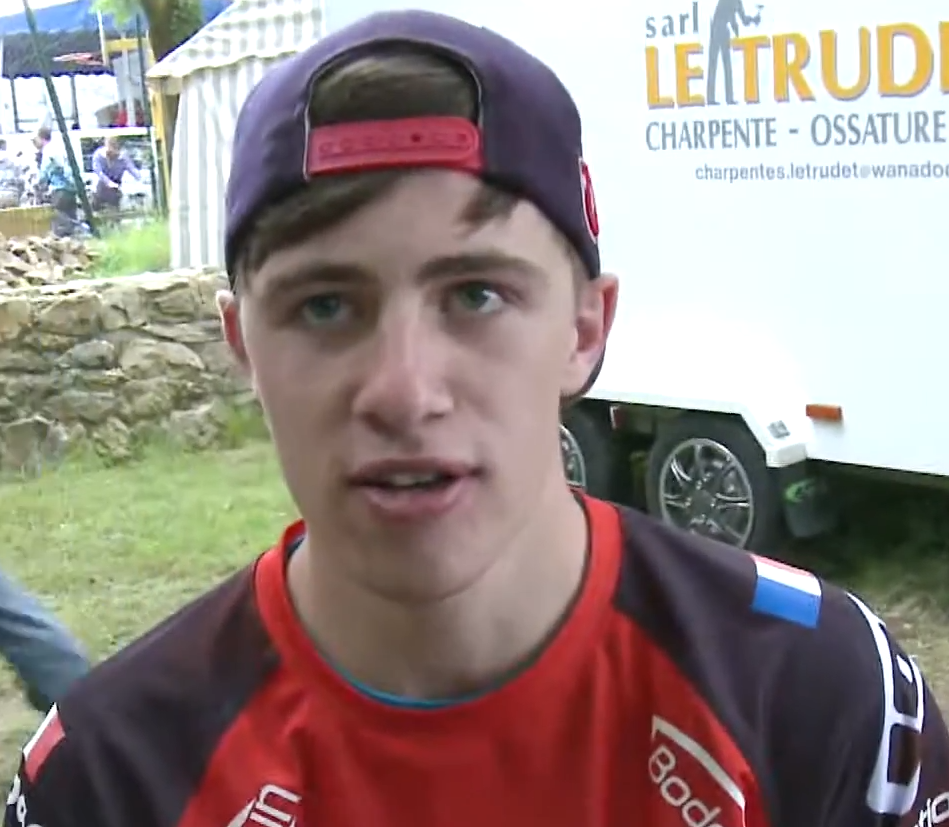
- Pilard in 2015

Personal information
- Born: 22 January 1996 (age 30) Vannes, France

Cycling career
- Sport: Cycling
- Current team: France
- Discipline: BMX racing
- Role: Rider
Medal record
Representing France
Men's BMX racing
World Championships
Gold medal – first place	2025 Copenhagen	BMX racing
Silver medal – second place	2023 Glasgow	BMX racing
World Cup
Gold medal – first place	2025	BMX racing
European Championships
Gold medal – first place	2024 Verona	BMX racing
Gold medal – first place	2021 Zolder	BMX racing
Silver medal – second place	2025 Valmiera	BMX racing

Arthur Pilard (born 22 January 1996) is a French cyclist who competes in BMX Racing. He was a gold medalist at the 2025 and silver medalist at the 2023 UCI BMX World Championships. He was also a gold medalist at the 2021 and 2024 European BMX Championships.

== Career ==
Born in Vannes, Brittany, he is a member of Saint-Brieuc BMX in Saint-Brieuc. He finished runner up in the Verona leg of the UCI BMX Racing World Cup in 2021. He won the 2021 European BMX Championships in Heusden-Zolder, Belgium and placed fifth overall in the 2021 World Championships. He ended the 2021 season with a second place at the French Championship. In early 2022, he reached the top of the UCI World Rankings.

He finished runner-up in Papendal at the third event in the 2023 UCI BMX Racing World Cup. He won the silver medal at the 2023 UCI BMX World Championships in Glasgow, Scotland, finishing 0.142 seconds behind the winner, his compatriot Romain Mahieu.

He won the gold medal at the 2024 European BMX Championships in Verona in June 2024. He was a silver medalist behind his compatriot Mathis Ragot Richard at the 2025 European BMX Championships in Valmiera, Latvia in July 2025. The following month, he won her first world title in Copenhagen at the 2025 UCI BMX World Championships.
