= Emily Hutt =

British BMX rider (born 2004)

Personal information
- Born: 12 August 2004 (age 22)

Cycling career
- Sport: Cycling
- Discipline: BMX racing
Medal record
Women's BMX racing
Representing Great Britain
World U23 Championships
Silver medal – second place	2023 Glasgow	BMX racing
Silver medal – second place	2024 Rock Hill	BMX racing
World Cup (U23)
Bronze medal – third place	2025	BMX racing
European U23 Championships
Silver medal – second place	2024 Verona	BMX racing

Emily Hutt (born 12 August 2004) is a British cyclist who competes in BMX Racing. She is a two-time silver medalist at the World U23 Championships.

== Early life ==
She started BMX racing at the age of three years—old at Runnymede and Hayes BMX racetracks near her home town Ashford, Surrey. The following year she began competing in U6 events. Whilst still in her teens she moved to Manchester to train with British Cycling and Olympic gold medalist Beth Shriever.

== Career ==
She was a silver medalist in the U23 race at the 2023 UCI BMX World Championships in Glasgow, Scotland. She finished sixth overall in the U23 standings in the 2023 UCI BMX Racing World Cup.

She was a silver medalist in the U23 race at the 2024 European BMX Championships in Verona. She was a silver medalist in the U23 race at the 2024 UCI BMX World Championships in Rock Hill, South Carolina. She finished fourth overall in the U23 standings for the 2024 UCI BMX Racing World Cup. She won the British national U23 title in July 2024. She was a travelling reserve for Great Britain at the 2024 Summer Olympics.

== Personal life ==
She has two siblings, Matt and Lucy, who also race BMX.
