= Rico Bearman =

New Zealand BMX rider (born 2003)

Personal information
- Born: 31 July 2003 (age 23) Auckland, New Zealand
- Height: 178 cm (5 ft 10 in)

Cycling career
- Sport: Cycling
- Discipline: BMX racing
Medal record
Men's BMX racing
Representing New Zealand
World U23 Championships
Bronze medal – third place	2023 Glasgow	BMX racing
World Cup (U23)
Gold medal – first place	2023	BMX racing
Silver medal – second place	2022	BMX racing

Rico Bearman (born 31 July 2003) is a BMX racer from New Zealand. The U23 World Cup winner in 2023, and New Zealand senior national champion in 2024, he was selected for the 2024 Summer Olympics.

== Career ==
=== Junior career ===
He won the bronze medal in the U23 category at the 2023 UCI Cycling World Championships in Glasgow, Scotland.

That year, he won the under-23 2023 UCI BMX Racing World Cup title in Santiago, Chile in October 2023. In doing so, he won six of the nine events in the World Cup programme.

=== Senior career ===
He made the step-up to senior racing in 2024. He clinched victory in the men's elite class at the 2024 New Zealand national championships in Havelock North in March 2024. He was selected for the senior New Zealand team for the UCI BMX World Championships in Rock Hill, South Carolina. After placing sixth in the final of the World Championships, he was subsequently named in the New Zealand team for the 2024 Summer Olympics in July 2024.

== Personal life ==
He is from North Harbour in New Zealand.
