= Bodi Turner =

Australian BMX rider

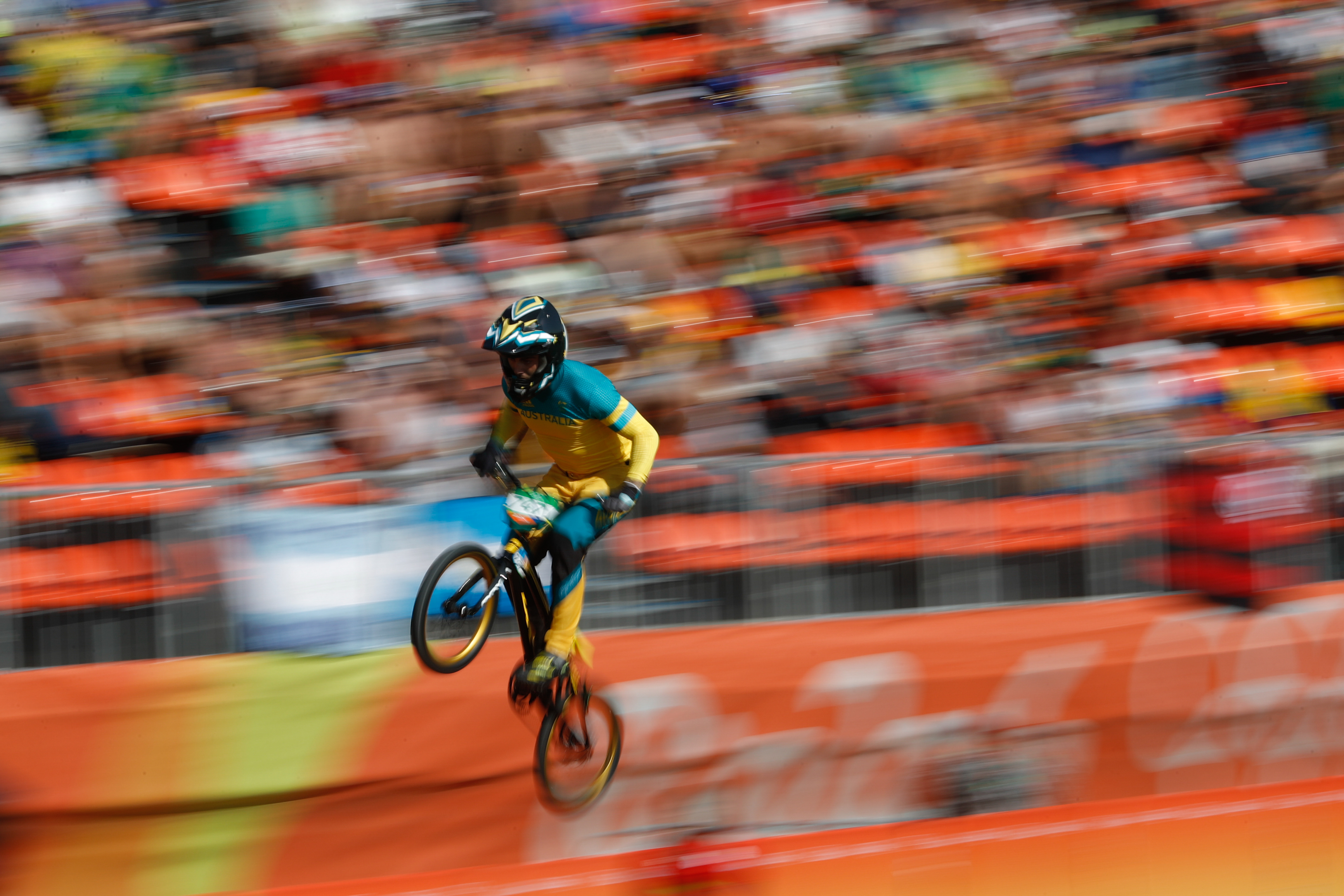

Personal information
- Born: 18 September 1994 (age 32) Melbourne, Victoria

Cycling career
- Sport: Cycling
- Current team: Australia
- Discipline: BMX racing
- Role: Rider

Bodi Turner (born 18 September 1994) is an Australian male BMX rider, representing his nation at international competition. He competed in the time trial event at the 2015 UCI BMX World Championships.

Turner was banned from competing by ASADA until 3 March 2019 for breaching Whereabouts rules. His Whereabouts violations were two missed tests and a filing failure in the period between November 2016 and August 2017.

== Career ==
Turner began riding BMX at the Eastfield BMX Club in Kilsyth at age four. He finished second in the 10 Boys category at the 2004 Australian BMX National Championships and won his class at the 2004 UCI BMX World Championships in the Netherlands.

He moved into senior competition in 2015, taking his first UCI BMX Supercross World Cup podium in Sweden and finishing 14th in the time trial at the 2015 UCI BMX World Championships. A semi-final appearance at the 2016 World Championships helped him qualify for the Rio 2016 Olympics, where he finished 20th overall after ranking 13th in the time trial.

In 2017 Turner recorded his career-best World Championships result, finishing 6th, and won that year's National Series round in Shepparton. He also won the Crankworx mountain bike event in Canada on debut. He returned to World Cup competition in 2020 and placed fourth at the 2021 Australian National Championships.

Turner's most successful period came in 2022–2023, with back-to-back Elite titles at both the Oceania BMX Championships and the Australian National Championships. He also placed second and third at the 2023 USA BMX Carolina Nationals, and took third in Round 9 of the 2023 UCI BMX Racing World Cup in Argentina.

A broken femur sustained in Round 2 of the 2024 UCI BMX World Cup in New Zealand ended his hopes of a second Olympic campaign that year. After roughly ten months of recovery, he returned to competition, winning the 2024 Victorian state championship and placing 7th in the Elite final and 5th in the Superclass final at the National Championships.
