= Aiko Gommers =

Belgian BMX racer

Personal information
- Born: 18 March 2004 (age 22)

Cycling career
- Sport: Cycling
- Discipline: BMX racing
Medal record
Women's BMX racing
Representing Belgium
World Cup (U23)
| Silver medal – second place | 2022 | BMX racing |
European Junior Championships
| Bronze medal – third place | 2022 Dessel | BMX racing |

Aiko Gommers (born 18 March 2004) is a Belgian BMX racer. She is the 2021 Red Bull BMX pump track world champion. She competed in the women's BMX racing event at the 2024 Summer Olympics.
