= Ailingen =

Coordinates: 47.6889°N 9.49583°E

Ailingen is the largest ortschaft (urban locality) of Friedrichshafen, Germany.

== History ==
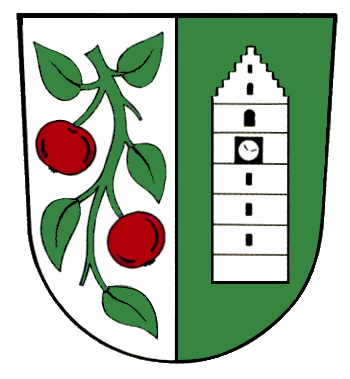
Coat of arms of the former Ailingen municipality

The place was first mentioned in documents in 771, as "villa Ailingas."
