= Diego Arboleda =

Colombian BMX rider (born 1996)

Personal information
- Full name: Diego Alejandro Arboleda Ospina
- Born: 16 August 1996 (age 30)

Cycling career
- Sport: Cycling
- Discipline: BMX racing
Medal record
Representing Colombia
Men's BMX racing
Event	1st	2nd	3rd
World Cup	0	0	1
World Cup rounds	3	3	2
Pan American Championships	5	0	1
CAC Games	2	0	0
South American Games	0	1	0
Bolivarian Games	2	0	1
Total	12	4	5
World Cup
Bronze medal – third place	2023	BMX racing
Pan American Championships
Gold medal – first place	2021 Lima	BMX racing
Gold medal – first place	2022 Santiago del Estero	BMX racing
Gold medal – first place	2024 Bogotá	BMX racing
Gold medal – first place	2025 Chillán	BMX racing
Gold medal – first place	2026 Bogotá	BMX racing
Bronze medal – third place	2019 Americana	BMX racing
Central American and Caribbean Games
Gold medal – first place	2023 San Salvador	BMX racing
Gold medal – first place	2026 Santo Domingo	BMX racing
South American Games
Silver medal – second place	2022 Asunción	BMX Racing
Bolivarian Games
Gold medal – first place	2017 Santa Marta	BMX time trial
Gold medal – first place	2022 Valledupar	BMX racing
Bronze medal – third place	2017 Santa Marta	BMX racing

Diego Alejandro Arboleda Ospina (born 16 August 1996) is a Colombian BMX racer. He won the bronze medal at the 2023 UCI BMX Racing World Cup and was selected for the 2024 Summer Olympics.

== Early and personal life ==
He is from Girardota in the Antioquia Department of Colombia. His brother Juan Pablo was also an international rider before training in medicine. The pair became interest in BMX when they were four years-old through a family friend, and received bikes as Christmas presents the following year. He also has a sister, Laura.

== Career ==
He had to have hip and femur surgery following a fall during training in 2018 and he left the race track at the 2019 Pan American Games in Lima, Peru on a stretcher following a bad race crash. Nevertheless, he returned to racing, and in 2021 he returned to Lima and won the BMX Pan American Championships.

In May 2022, he became the first Colombian man to lead the world rankings. He won the opening race of the 2022 UCI BMX Racing World Cup on 28 May 2022 in Glasgow, Scotland. He was a silver medalist at the 2022 South American Games in Asunción, Paraguay.

He won the bronze medal at the conclusion of the 2023 UCI BMX Racing World Cup.

He was selected to represent Colombia at the 2024 Summer Olympics in Paris. Racing at the Games, he made it through the preliminary round on 1 August 2024, to race in the semi finals.
