= Saya Sakakibara =

Australian cyclist (born 1999)

Saya Sakakibara OAM
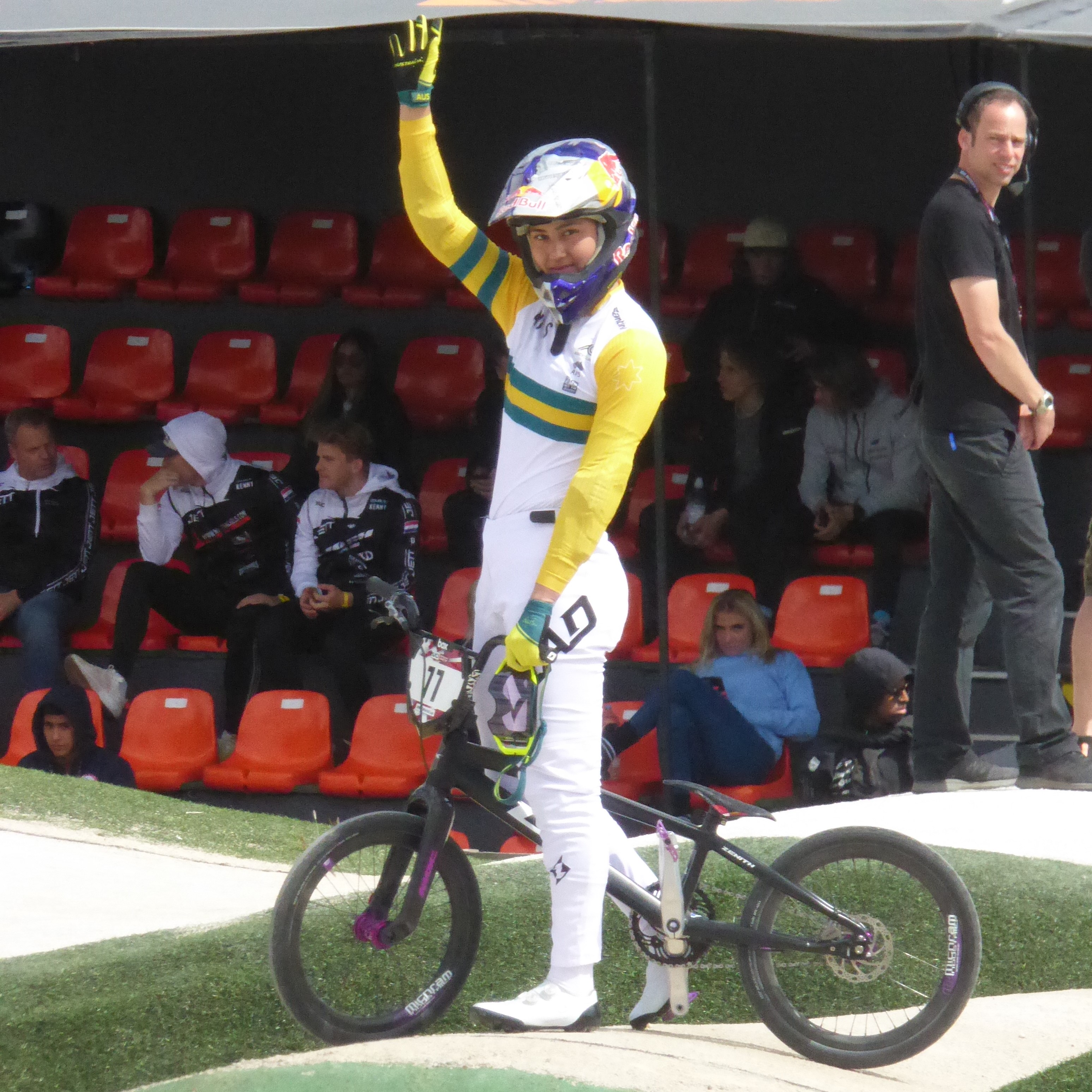
- Sakakibara in 2022

Personal information
- Born: 23 August 1999 (age 27) Gold Coast, Queensland, Australia

Cycling career
- Sport: Cycling
Medal record
Representing Australia
Women's BMX racing
| Event | 1st | 2nd | 3rd |
|---|---|---|---|
| Olympic Games | 1 | 0 | 0 |
| World Championships | 0 | 2 | 0 |
| World Junior Championships | 0 | 1 | 0 |
| World Cup | 3 | 2 | 0 |
| World Cup rounds | 12 | 10 | 3 |
| Oceania Championships | 2 | 0 | 0 |
| Oceania Junior Championships | 2 | 0 | 0 |
| Total | 20 | 15 | 3 |
Olympic Games
| Gold medal – first place | 2024 Paris | BMX racing |
World Championships
| Silver medal – second place | 2025 Copenhagen | BMX racing |
| Silver medal – second place | 2026 Brisbane | BMX racing |
World Cup
| Gold medal – first place | 2023 | BMX racing |
| Gold medal – first place | 2024 | BMX racing |
| Gold medal – first place | 2025 | BMX racing |
| Silver medal – second place | 2018 | BMX racing |
| Silver medal – second place | 2020 | BMX racing |
Oceania Championships
| Gold medal – first place | 2019 Te Awamutu | BMX racing |
| Gold medal – first place | 2023 Rotorua | BMX racing |
World Junior Championships
| Silver medal – second place | 2017 Rock Hill | BMX racing |
Oceania Junior Championships
| Gold medal – first place | 2016 Auckland | BMX racing |
| Gold medal – first place | 2017 Bathurst | BMX racing |

Saya Sakakibara (born 23 August 1999) is an Australian cyclist competing in BMX racing events.

== Early life ==
Sakakibara was born on the Gold Coast, Queensland, to a mother of Japanese heritage and a father of British citizenship. She started BMX racing at the age of four after watching her older brother Kai competing. The family moved to Sydney in 2007 and Sakakibara joined the South Illawarra BMX Club where her brother Kai was a member. She then began competing on the junior circuits and quickly rose through the ranks winning state and national titles.

== Personal life ==
Sakakibara is in a relationship with French BMX rider Romain Mahieu. She was the subject of ABC TV's Australian Story broadcast on 20 October 2025. Her autobiography Just Go: Turning fear into a superpower was published by Simon & Schuster on 28 October 2025.

== Career ==
Sakakibara has represented Australia at World Championship level. She won a silver medal in the Junior Elite BMX Supercross at the 2017 World Championships. She was awarded AusCycling's Female BMX Racing Rider of the Year in 2020. She was selected for the delayed 2020 Summer Olympics as part of the Australian team. She crashed in the semi-finals of the Olympics and did not qualify for the final.

She won the 2023 UCI BMX Racing World Cup and retained her title in Tulsa in 2024.

She won gold at the 2024 Summer Olympics in Paris. She was jointly awarded the Sir Hubert Opperman Trophy of 2024, along with Grace Brown, for the Australian cyclist of the year.

She won a silver medal the 2025 BMX World Championships in Denmark. She won her third World Cup in 2025 after winning the final two rounds in Argentina.

== Major results ==
2016
1st Junior Elite BMX Supercross National Championships
1st Junior Elite BMX Supercross Oceania Championships
2017
1st Junior Elite BMX Supercross National Championships
1st Junior Elite BMX Supercross Oceania Championships
2nd Junior Elite BMX Supercross World Championships
2018
6th Elite BMX Supercross World Championships
2019
1st Elite BMX Supercross Oceania Championships
1st Elite Tokyo 2020 BMX Test Event
7th Elite BMX Supercross World Championships
2021
1st Superclass Women BMX National Championships
2023
1st UCI BMX Racing World Cup
1st Oceania Championships
1st Elite BMX National Championships
2024
1st UCI BMX Racing World Cup
XXXIII Olympics (Paris 2024) Gold Medal Women's Cycling BMX Racing
2025
1st UCI BMX Racing World Cup
1st Elite BMX National Championships
2nd UCI BMX World Championships, Elite
2026
1st Elite BMX National Championships
2nd UCI BMX World Championships, Elite
