= Izaac Kennedy =

Australian cyclist (born 2000)

Personal information
- Born: 24 October 2000 (age 26) Gold Coast, Queensland Australia

Cycling career
- Sport: Cycling
Medal record
Men's BMX racing
Representing Australia
World Championships
Silver medal – second place	2025 Copenhagen	BMX racing
World Cup
Gold medal – first place	2024	BMX racing
Bronze medal – third place	2022	BMX racing
Oceania Junior Championships
Silver medal – second place	2017 Bathurst	BMX racing

Izaac Kennedy (born 24 October 2000) is an Australian cyclist competing in BMX Supercross events.

== Early life ==
Brought up in Queensland's Gold Coast, he started riding BMX bikes when he was three years-old at the Nerang BMX Club. By the time he was nine years-old he had won his firat first State Title and competed in his first World Title event, finishing fourth in his age group.

== Career ==
At the age of 18 years-old, Kennedy won the elite men's national title at the Australian national championships in 2019. He also finished on the podium in his first World Cup final, and reached the quarter finals of his debut World Championships. He retained his Australian national title in December 2021. In doing so, became the first back-to-back Australian champion for over twenty years. He would later reach the World Championship final for the first time, placing seventh overall.

In July 2023, Kennedy suffered a knee ligament injury in Nevada that ruled him out of racing for the rest of the season.

He returned for the first round of the 2024 UCI BMX Racing World Cup in New Zealand in February 2024. He then won the third round in Brisbane in February 2024. He subsequently clinched the overall UCI BMX Supercross World Cup title with two second places in Tulsa in April 2024.

In August 2025, he won the silver medal in Copenhagen, Denmark at the 2025 UCI BMX World Championships.

== Personal life ==
From the City of Gold Coast, his home track is in Nerang, Queensland.
