= Leila Walker =

New Zealand BMX rider (born 2005)

Personal information
- Born: 29 March 2005 (age 21) Hamilton, New Zealand
- Height: 175 cm (5 ft 9 in)

Cycling career
- Sport: Cycling
- Discipline: BMX racing

Leila Walker (born 29 March 2005) is a BMX racer from New Zealand. She became New Zealand national champion in 2024 and was selected for the 2024 Summer Olympics.

== Early life ==
She is from Cambridge, New Zealand. She started BMX, inspired by watching her cousins racing, when she was six years-old. She attended Cambridge Middle School and was a prolific winner at age-group level. She has won her sixth consecutive age-group world title in 2018 at the age of 13 years-old.

== Career ==
Walker won on her debut in the junior elite competition at the UCI BMX Racing World Cup round in Bogotá. She won her first elite women’s New Zealand national title in 2024.

Competing at the UCI BMX World Championships in Rock Hill, South Carolina, she finished seventh in the elite grand final, which earned a Paris Olympic Games qualification spot for New Zealand. She was subsequently selected for the 2024 Summer Olympics in July 2024.

== Personal life ==
She is not related to compatriot rider Sarah Walker.
