= Cameron Wood (cyclist) =

American professional BMX racer

Personal information
- Full name: Cameron Donald Wood
- Born: November 16, 2001 (age 24) Great Falls, Montana, U.S.

Cycling career
- Sport: Cycling
- Discipline: BMX racing
- Role: Rider
- Rider type: Elite Men
Medal record
Men's BMX racing
Representing United States
World Cup
Silver medal – second place	2022	BMX racing
Bronze medal – third place	2025	BMX racing
Pan American Games
Silver medal – second place	2023 Santiago	BMX racing

Cameron Donald Wood (born November 16, 2001) is an American BMX cyclist. He was a silver medalist at the 2023 Pan American Games.

== Early life ==
He is from Bozeman, Montana and began riding BMX when he was three years-old. He attended Bozeman High School before moving to Phoenix, Arizona at the age of 16 years-old.

== Career ==
He was a top Junior BMX racer in the United States in 2019, winning 17 National events.

He finished the 2022 UCI BMX Racing World Cup season second in the standings, incorporating four World Cup podiums and including a win in the World Cup event in Bogotá in September 2022.

He was a silver medalist at the 2023 Pan American Games in Santiago.

He was selected for the 2024 Summer Olympics.
