= Sylvain André =

French bicycle motocross rider

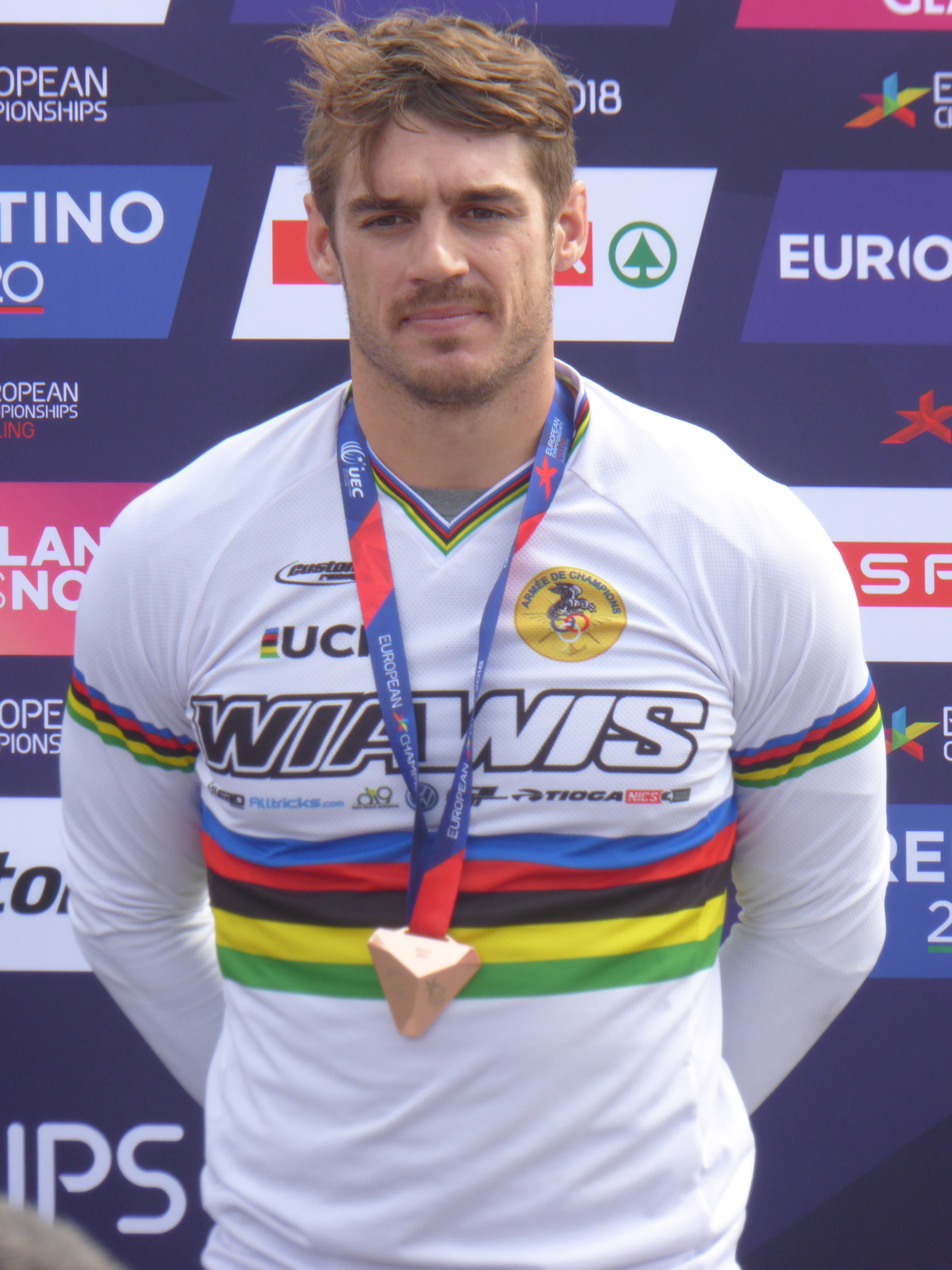
- André in 2018

Personal information
- Born: 14 October 1992 (age 34) Cavaillon, France

Cycling career
- Sport: Cycling
- Discipline: BMX racing
- Role: Rider
Medal record
Representing France
Men's BMX racing
Olympic Games
Silver medal – second place	2024 Paris	BMX racing
World Championships
Gold medal – first place	2018 Baku	BMX racing
Silver medal – second place	2017 Rock Hill	BMX racing
Silver medal – second place	2021 Arnhem	BMX racing
Bronze medal – third place	2019 Heusden-Zolder	BMX racing
Bronze medal – third place	2024 Rock Hill	BMX racing
World Cup
Gold medal – first place	2017	BMX racing
Gold medal – first place	2022	BMX racing
Silver medal – second place	2025	BMX racing
Bronze medal – third place	2018	BMX racing
European Championships
Bronze medal – third place	2025 Valmiera	BMX racing

Sylvain André (born 14 October 1992) is a French male BMX rider, representing his nation at international competitions. He competed in the time trial event at the 2015 UCI BMX World Championships. He won the silver medal at the 2024 Summer Olympics in the Men’s BMX racing event.
