= Jaymio Brink =

Dutch BMX rider (born 2004)

Personal information
- Born: 9 May 2004 (age 22)

Cycling career
- Sport: Cycling
- Discipline: BMX racing
Medal record
Men's BMX racing
Representing Netherlands
World Junior Championships
| Silver medal – second place | 2022 Nantes | BMX racing |

Jaymio Brink (born 9 May 2004) is a Dutch BMX racer. He was selected for the 2024 Summer Olympics.

== Career ==
From Arnhem, he started BMX racing at a young age and won his first age-group national title when he was ten years-old. In 2022, he became Dutch junior champion. He was a silver medalist in the junior race at the 2022 UCI BMX World Championships in Nantes.

He competed as an elite rider in 2023, skipping the U23 categories. He secured his first win as an elite rider on his debut race, in Tours, France in January 2023.

He was selected for the UCI BMX World Championships in Rock Hill, South Carolina in May 2024. He was also selected to make his Olympic debut at the 2024 Summer Olympics.

== Personal life ==
His father Dorus Brink was a BMX racer, and a multiple-time National, European, and World Champion. His mother and his grand parents also used to race.
