= Romain Mahieu =

French BMX cyclist

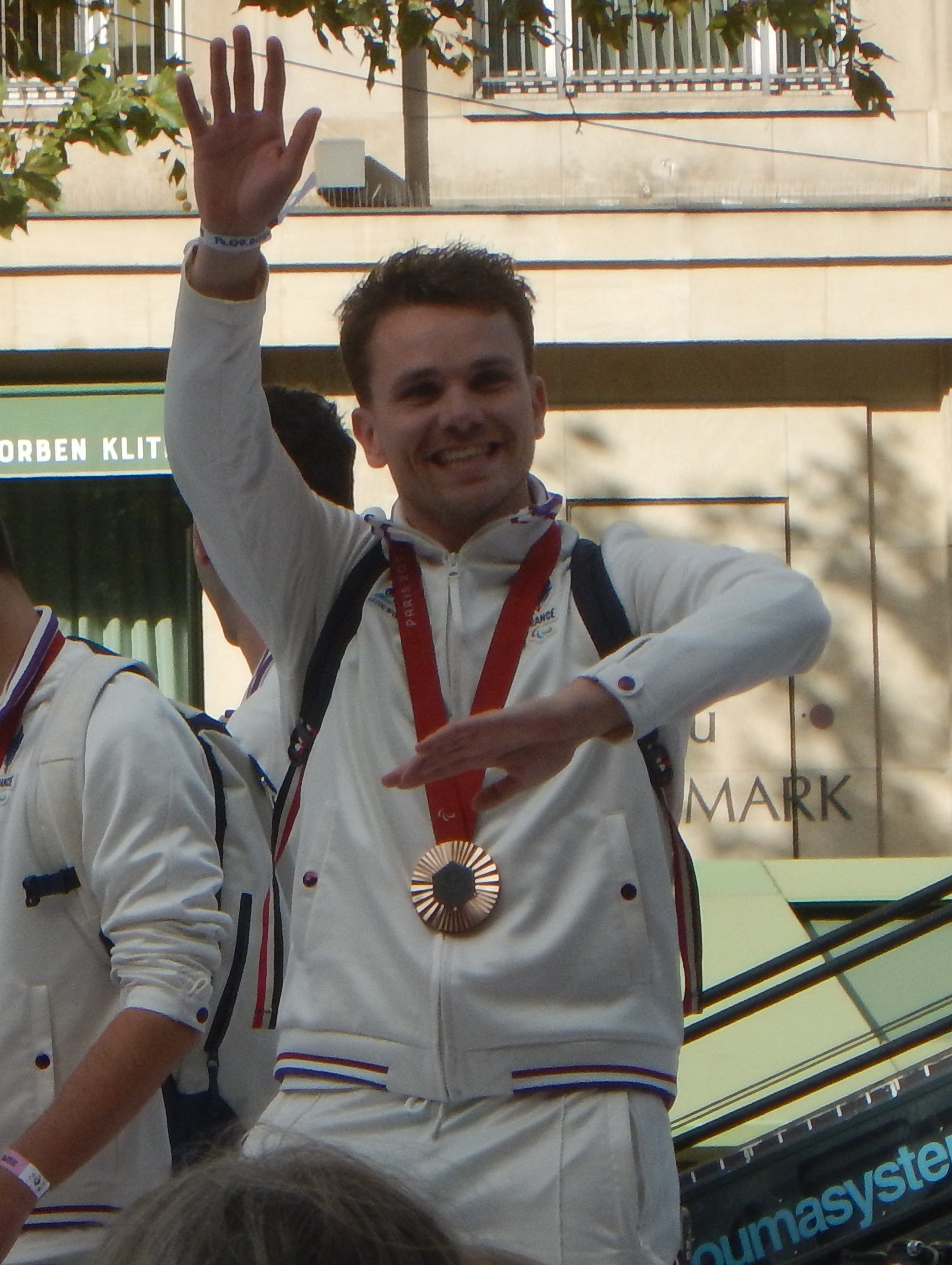
- Mahieu in 2024

Personal information
- Born: 17 February 1995 (age 31) Lille, France

Cycling career
- Sport: Cycling
- Current team: France
- Discipline: BMX racing
- Role: Rider
Medal record
Representing France
Men's BMX racing
Olympic Games
Bronze medal – third place	2024 Paris	BMX racing
World Championships
Gold medal – first place	2023 Glasgow	BMX racing
World Cup
Gold medal – first place	2023	BMX racing

Romain Mahieu (born 17 February 1995) is a French male BMX rider, representing his nation at international competitions. He won gold in the time trial event at the 2023 UCI BMX World Championships. He achieved a bronze medal at the 2024 Summer Olympics in the Men’s BMX racing event.
