= Jérémy Rencurel =

French BMX rider (born 1995)

Personal information
- Born: 13 April 1995 (age 31) Beaumont-sur-Oise, France
- Height: 181 cm (5 ft 11 in)

Sport
- Country: France
- Sport: Cycling
- Event: BMX racing
Medal record
Representing France
Men's BMX racing
European Championships
Silver medal – second place	2026 Sarrians	BMX racing

Jérémy Rencurel (born 13 April 1995) is a French BMX rider. He competed at the 2016 Summer Olympics in the men's BMX race, in which he was eliminated in the quarterfinals.
