= Sarrians =

- Commune
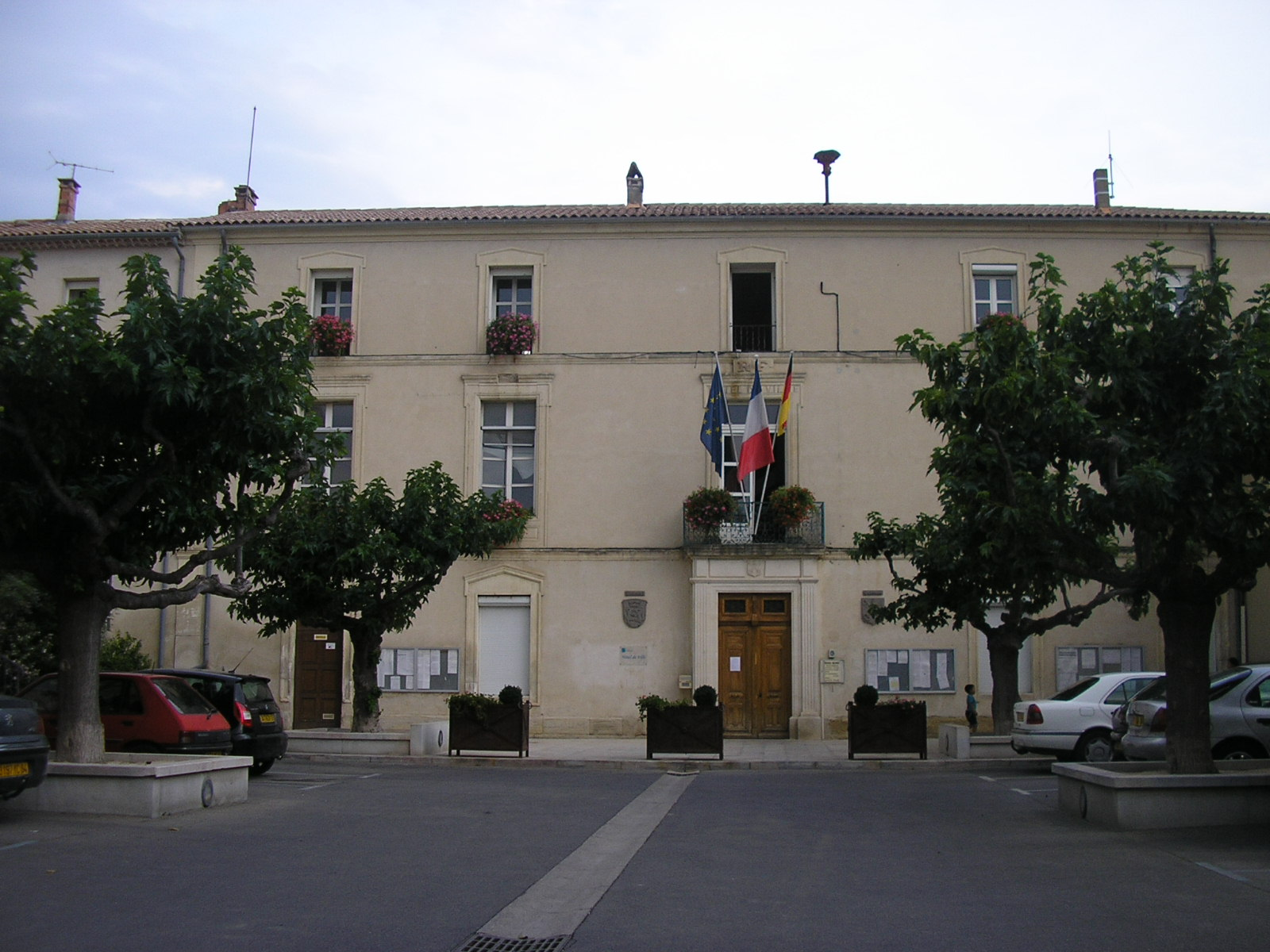
- Town hall

- Coat of arms
- Location of Sarrians
- Location within France Location within Provence-Alpes-Côte d'Azur
- Coordinates: 44°05′03″N 4°58′19″E
- Country: France
- Region: Provence-Alpes-Côte d'Azur
- Department: Vaucluse
- Arrondissement: Carpentras
- Canton: Monteux
- Intercommunality: CA Ventoux-Comtat Venaissin

Government
  - Mayor (2020–2026): Anne-Marie Bardet
- Area^{1}: 37.49 km^{2} (14.47 sq mi)
- Elevation: 36 m (118 ft)
- Highest elevation: 118 m (387 ft)
- Lowest elevation: 26 m (85 ft)
- Population (2023): 5,792
  - Density: 154.5/km^{2} (400.1/sq mi)
- Time zone: UTC+01:00 (CET)
  - Summer (DST): UTC+02:00 (CEST)
- INSEE/Postal code: 84122 /84260
- ^{1} French Land Register data, which excludes lakes, ponds, glaciers > 1 km^{2} (0.386 sq mi or 247 acres) and river estuaries.

Sarrians (French pronunciation: [saʁjɑ̃]; Occitan: Sarrian) is a commune in the Vaucluse department in the Provence-Alpes-Côte d'Azur region in southeastern France.

== Population ==
Historical population
| Year | Pop. | ±% p.a. |
|---|---|---|
| 1968 | 3,554 | — |
| 1975 | 4,052 | +1.89% |
| 1982 | 5,030 | +3.14% |
| 1990 | 5,094 | +0.16% |
| 1999 | 5,459 | +0.77% |
| 2007 | 5,705 | +0.55% |
| 2012 | 5,841 | +0.47% |
| 2017 | 6,065 | +0.76% |
| 2023 | 5,792 | −0.76% |
Source: INSEE

== Hominin remains ==
Several hominin bones, showing breakages due to sediment pressure, have been found nearby.

== See also ==
- Communes of the Vaucluse department
