= Cycling at the 2024 Summer Olympics – Men's BMX racing =

Men's BMX racing at the Games of the XXXIII Olympiad
- Olympic BMX cycling
- Venue: Vélodrome National de Saint-Quentin-en-Yvelines
- Date: 1–2 August 2024
- Winning time: 31.422 sec

Medalists
1st place, gold medalist(s)		Joris Daudet	France
2nd place, silver medalist(s)		Sylvain André	France
3rd place, bronze medalist(s)		Romain Mahieu	France

The men's BMX racing competition at the 2024 Summer Olympics took place on 1 and 2 August 2024 at the Vélodrome National de Saint-Quentin-en-Yvelines.

== Background ==
This was the 5th appearance of the event, which has been held at every Summer Olympics since BMX racing was added to the programme in 2008.

== Competition format ==
The competition was a three-round tournament, with quarterfinals, semifinals, and a final.

- Quarterfinals: three heats of eight cyclists each. Each heat had three runs, using a point-for-place system (one point for the winner of a run, two points for second, etc.), with the lowest points over the three runs winning. The best six cyclists in each heat (12 total) advanced to the semifinals, and the riders ranked 13–20 move to a last chance qualifier. In the last-chance qualifier, those eight riders race one time, and the top-four finishers advance to the semifinals, while the others cyclists were eliminated.
- Semifinals: two heats of eight cyclists each. Again there were three runs per heat, using the point-for-place system. The top four cyclists in each semifinal (eight total) advanced to the final; the others (eight cyclists) were eliminated. In both the quarterfinals and the semifinals, riders are reseeded for the next heat according to time. If two or more riders are equal in points at the end of three runs, the times will be used to break the tie.
- Final: one final of eight cyclists. There was only a single run.

== Schedule ==
The event took place over two consecutive days.

All times are Central European Time (UTC+2)

Date	Time	Round
1 August	20:00	Quarterfinals
1 August	22:05	Last chance race
2 August	20:00	Semifinals
2 August	21:35	Final

== Results ==
Q - qualified for the next round; DNF - did not finish

=== Quarter-finals ===
Rank	#	Name	Nation	1st run		2nd run		3rd run		Total	Notes
Rank	#	Name	Nation	Heat	Time	Heat	Time	Heat	Time	Total	Notes
1	3	Sylvain André	France	1	31.979 (2)	3	31.854 (1)	2	31.661 (1)	4	Q
2	100	Romain Mahieu	France	2	31.472 (1)	1	32.025 (3)	1	31.768 (1)	5	Q
3	1	Joris Daudet	France	1	31.692 (1)	2	31.463 (1)	1	32.299 (3)	5	Q
4	233	Kamren Larsen	United States	1	32.016 (3)	3	31.927 (2)	2	31.926 (4)	9	Q
5	12	Cameron Wood	United States	3	32.207 (1)	1	31.967 (2)	1	32.473 (4)	7	Q
6	10	Izaac Kennedy	Australia	1	32.750 (5)	2	31.878 (2)	3	31.835 (1)	8	Q
7	5	Alfredo Campo	Ecuador	3	32.773 (4)	1	31.893 (1)	3	32.612 (3)	8	Q
8	149	Cédric Butti	Switzerland	3	32.394 (3)	3	32.241 (3)	2	32.221 (4)	10	Q
9	70	Mateo Carmona	Colombia	2	32.389 (2)	2	46.500 (7)	3	32.108 (2)	11	Q
10	87	Kye Whyte	Great Britain	2	33.544 (5)	2	32.377 (3)	3	33.147 (4)	12	Q
11	741	Diego Arboleda	Colombia	1	32.835 (6)	1	32.798 (5)	1	32.187 (2)	13	Q
12	257	Pietro Bertagnoli	Italy	2	32.730 (3)	3	32.488 (4)	3	33.803 (7)	14	Q
13	248	Ruben Gommers	Belgium	3	33.254 (5)	3	32.566 (5)	1	32.663 (5)	15	q
14	6	Rico Bearman	New Zealand	1	33.090 (7)	3	33.058 (6)	2	32.093 (3)	16	q
15	192	Dave van der Burg	Netherlands	1	32.206 (4)	2	34.251 (6)	1	33.121 (6)	16	q
16	278	Carlos Ramírez	Colombia	3	32.248 (2)	1	33.110 (6)	3	1:13.918 (8)	16	q
17	239	Jaymio Brink	Netherlands	2	32.870 (4)	2	DNF	2	33.049 (5)	17	q
18	7	Mauricio Molina	Chile	2	33.752 (7)	2	33.615 (4)	2	33.153 (6)	17	q
19	179	Simon Marquart	Switzerland	2	33.557 (6)	1	32.545 (4)	2	33.288 (7)	17	q
20	236	Gonzalo Molina	Argentina	3	34.230 (7)	3	33.196 (7)	3	33.366 (5)	19	q
21	997	Philip Schaub	Germany	3	33.632 (6)	1	34.803 (8)	3	33.381 (6)	20	
22	266	Dean Reeves	Morocco	1	34.543 (8)	2	34.121 (5)	1	40.829 (7)	20	
23	260	Komet Sukprasert	Thailand	3	35.083 (8)	1	34.791 (7)	2	34.372 (8)	23	
24	996	Kristens Krīgers	Latvia	2	34.163 (8)	3	DNF	1	DNF	26	

=== Last chance race ===
Rank	#	Name	Time	Notes
1	6	Rico Bearman (NZL)	32.736	Q
2	179	Simon Marquart (SUI)	33.328	Q
3	7	Mauricio Molina (CHI)	33.881	Q
4	239	Jaymio Brink (NED)	34.253	Q
5	192	Dave van der Burg (NED)	34.818	
6	236	Gonzalo Molina (ARG)	35.097	
7	248	Ruben Gommers (BEL)	1:36.250	
8	278	Carlos Ramírez (COL)	DNF	

=== Semi-finals ===
==== Heat 1 ====
Rank	#	Name	1st run	2nd run	3rd run	Total	Notes
1	1	Joris Daudet (FRA)	31.752 (1)	32.855 (3)	31.489 (1)	5	Q
2	3	Sylvain André (FRA)	32.498 (2)	32.010 (1)	31.568 (2)	5	Q
3	70	Mateo Carmona (COL)	32.536 (3)	32.981 (3)	32.745 (4)	10	Q
4	12	Cameron Wood (USA)	32.640 (4)	34.028 (6)	32.096 (3)	13	Q
5	257	Pietro Bertagnoli (ITA)	33.051 (6)	32.454 (2)	32.920 (7)	15	
6	239	Jaymio Brink (NED)	33.313 (7)	55.688 (7)	32.336 (4)	18	
7	6	Rico Bearman (NZL)	33.382 (8)	33.298 (5)	32.626 (5)	18	
8	233	Kamren Larsen (USA)	32.671 (5)	DNF	33.197 (8)	21	

==== Heat 2 ====
Rank	#	Name	1st run	2nd run	3rd run	Total	Notes
1	100	Romain Mahieu (FRA)	31.631 (1)	31.649 (1)	31.767 (1)	3	Q
2	149	Cédric Butti (SUI)	32.375 (3)	32.731 (3)	32.201 (2)	8	Q
3	179	Simon Marquart (SUI)	32.459 (4)	32.153 (2)	32.343 (3)	9	Q
4	10	Izaac Kennedy (AUS)	31.985 (2)	33.107 (4)	32.934 (5)	11	Q
5	741	Diego Arboleda (COL)	33.405 (7)	33.362 (6)	32.799 (5)	18	
6	5	Alfredo Campo (ECU)	33.015 (6)	33.676 (6)	33.126 (6)	18	
7	87	Kye Whyte (GBR)	32.808 (5)	DNS	DNS	21	
8	7	Mauricio Molina (CHI)	DNF	DNS	DNS	24	

=== Final ===
Rank	#	Name	Time	Notes
1st place, gold medalist(s)	1	Joris Daudet (FRA)	31.422	
2nd place, silver medalist(s)	3	Sylvain André (FRA)	31.706	
3rd place, bronze medalist(s)	100	Romain Mahieu (FRA)	32.022	
4	149	Cédric Butti (SUI)	32.124	
5	12	Cameron Wood (USA)	32.446	
6	70	Mateo Carmona (COL)	33.166	
7	179	Simon Marquart (SUI)	44.914	
8	10	Izaac Kennedy (AUS)	DNF	
