= 2021 UCI BMX Racing World Cup =

- Sport: BMX racing
- Hosts: (Italy) Verona (Colombia) Bogotá (Turkey) Sakarya (2 times)
- Duration: 8 May – 31 October
- Men Elite: (gold) (Switzerland) Simon Marquart; (silver) (Colombia) Carlos Ramírez; (bronze) (France) Joris Daudet
- Women Elite: (gold) (Colombia) Mariana Pajón; (silver) (Netherlands) Laura Smulders; (bronze) (United States) Felicia Stancil
- Men Under 23: (gold) (Japan) Asuma Nakai; (silver) (Belgium) Wannes Magdelijns; (bronze) (Ecuador) Cristhian Castro
- Women Under 23: (gold) (Switzerland) Thalya Burford; (silver) (France) Léa Brindjonc; (bronze) (Japan) Jui Yabuta

Seasons
- ← 2020 2022 →

The 2021 UCI BMX Racing World Cup is the annual edition of the UCI BMX Racing World Cup in the Olympic bmx racing event, governed by the UCI. For the first time, the UCI BMX Racing World Cup includes events for both men and women in the under-23 category. The first four rounds award UCI points that count towards qualification for the 2020 Summer Olympics.

== Calendar ==
The calendar for the 2021 UCI BMX Racing World Cup include 4 stages (8 rounds).

Date	Location	Ref.
8–9 May	Verona, Italy	
29–30 May	Bogotá, Colombia	
23–24 October	Sakarya, Turkey	
30–31 October	Sakarya, Turkey	

== Results ==
=== Men's elite ===
Stage	Venue	1st place, gold medalist(s)	2nd place, silver medalist(s)	3rd place, bronze medalist(s)
1	(Italy) Verona	Simon Marquart (SUI)	Arthur Pilard (FRA)	Nicolás Torres (ARG)
2	(Italy) Verona	David Graf (SUI)	Simon Marquart (SUI)	Niek Kimmann (NED)
3	(Colombia) Bogotá	Joris Daudet (FRA)	Cédric Butti (SUI)	Helvijs Babris (LAT)
4	(Colombia) Bogotá	Joris Daudet (FRA)	Carlos Ramírez (COL)	Arthur Pilard (FRA)
5	(Turkey) Sakarya	Simon Marquart (SUI)	Joris Daudet (FRA)	Cédric Butti (SUI)
6	(Turkey) Sakarya	Carlos Ramírez (COL)	Romain Racine (FRA)	Aleksandr Katyshev (RUS)
7	(Turkey) Sakarya	Diego Arboleda (COL)	Vincent Pelluard (COL)	Carlos Ramírez (COL)
8	(Turkey) Sakarya	Simon Marquart (SUI)	Diego Arboleda (COL)	Joris Daudet (FRA)

=== Women's elite ===
Stage	Venue	1st place, gold medalist(s)	2nd place, silver medalist(s)	3rd place, bronze medalist(s)
1	(Italy) Verona	Judy Baauw (NED)	Merel Smulders (NED)	Sae Hatakeyama (JPN)
2	(Italy) Verona	Laura Smulders (NED)	Zoé Claessens (SUI)	Natalia Afremova (RUS)
3	(Colombia) Bogotá	Mariana Pajón (COL)	Gabriela Bolle (COL)	Natalia Afremova (RUS)
4	(Colombia) Bogotá	Mariana Pajón (COL)	Payton Ridenour (USA)	Natalia Afremova (RUS)
5	(Turkey) Sakarya	Felicia Stancil (USA)	Eliška Bartuňková (CZE)	Molly Simpson (CAN)
6	(Turkey) Sakarya	Laura Smulders (NED)	Felicia Stancil (USA)	Zoé Claessens (SUI)
7	(Turkey) Sakarya	Laura Smulders (NED)	Felicia Stancil (USA)	Mariana Pajón (COL)
8	(Turkey) Sakarya	Laura Smulders (NED)	Felicia Stancil (USA)	Mariana Pajón (COL)

=== Men under 23 ===
Stage	Venue	1st place, gold medalist(s)	2nd place, silver medalist(s)	3rd place, bronze medalist(s)
1	(Italy) Verona	Ynze Oegema (NED)	Einar Lindberg (SWE)	Wannes Magdelijns (BEL)
2	(Italy) Verona	Brian van Eeuwijk (NED)	Ynze Oegema (NED)	Pierre Geisse (FRA)
3	(Colombia) Bogotá	Asuma Nakai (JPN)	Cristhian Castro (ECU)	Daniel Castro (COL)
4	(Colombia) Bogotá	Asuma Nakai (JPN)	Juan Chaparro (COL)	Cristhian Castro (ECU)
5	(Turkey) Sakarya	Pietro Bertagnoli (ITA)	Asuma Nakai (JPN)	Tim Weiersmüller (SUI)
6	(Turkey) Sakarya	Loris Aeberhard (SUI)	Asuma Nakai (JPN)	Matéo Colsenet (FRA)
7	(Turkey) Sakarya	Pietro Bertagnoli (ITA)	Matéo Colsenet (FRA)	Mathijn Bogaert (BEL)
8	(Turkey) Sakarya	Asuma Nakai (JPN)	Giacomo Gargaglia (ITA)	Mathijn Bogaert (BEL)

=== Women under 23 ===
Stage	Venue	1st place, gold medalist(s)	2nd place, silver medalist(s)	3rd place, bronze medalist(s)
1	(Italy) Verona	Thalya Burford (SUI)	Michelle Wissing (NED)	Francesca Cingolani (ARG)
2	(Italy) Verona	Tessa Martinez (FRA)	Thalya Burford (SUI)	Léa Brindjonc (FRA)
3	(Colombia) Bogotá	Thalya Burford (SUI)	María Restrepo (COL)	Paola Parra (COL)
4	(Colombia) Bogotá	Thalya Burford (SUI)	María Restrepo (COL)	Ana Cadavid (COL)
5	(Turkey) Sakarya	Francesca Cingolani (ARG)	Jui Yabuta (JPN)	Léa Brindjonc (FRA)
6	(Turkey) Sakarya	Kanami Tanno (JPN)	Thalya Burford (SUI)	Léa Brindjonc (FRA)
7	(Turkey) Sakarya	Jui Yabuta (JPN)	Vineta Pētersone (LAT)	Léa Brindjonc (FRA)
8	(Turkey) Sakarya	Léa Brindjonc (FRA)	Vineta Pētersone (LAT)	Thalya Burford (SUI)

== Standings ==
=== Men elite ===
Pos.	Racer	Points
1	Simon Marquart (SUI)	740
2	Carlos Ramírez (COL)	675
3	Joris Daudet (FRA)	640
4	Vincent Pelluard (COL)	632
5	Cédric Butti (SUI)	595
6	Diego Arboleda (COL)	575
7	Arthur Pilard (FRA)	560
8	Romain Racine (FRA)	535
9	Romain Mahieu (FRA)	520
10	Giacomo Fantini (ITA)	440

=== Women elite ===
Pos.	Racer	Points
1	Mariana Pajón (COL)	815
2	Laura Smulders (NED)	770
3	Felicia Stancil (USA)	705
4	Natalia Afremova (RUS)	635
5	Payton Ridenour (USA)	600
6	Merel Smulders (NED)	550
7	Natalia Suvorova (RUS)	535
8	Zoé Claessens (SUI)	500
9	Molly Simpson (CAN)	485
10	Sae Hatakeyama (JPN)	470

=== Men Under 23 ===
Pos.	Racer	Points
1	Asuma Nakai (JPN)	810
2	Wannes Magdelijns (BEL)	500
3	Cristhian Castro (ECU)	485
4	Brian van Eeuwijk (NED)	435
5	Pietro Bertagnoli (ITA)	405
6	Matéo Colsenet (FRA)	385
7	Efrain Chamorro (ECU)	370
8	Pedro Benalcazar (ECU)	330
9	Mathijn Bogaert (BEL)	325
10	Einar Lindberg (SWE)	320

=== Women Under 23 ===
Pos.	Racer	Points
1	Thalya Burford (SUI)	970
2	Léa Brindjonc (FRA)	710
3	Jui Yabuta (JPN)	480
4	Francesca Cingolani (ARG)	435
5	Vineta Pētersone (LAT)	405
6	Kanami Tanno (JPN)	380
7	Doménica Mora (ECU)	365
8	Nadine Aeberhard (SUI)	330
9	Aiko Gommers (BEL)	290
10	Neneka Nishimura (JPN)	275

== Medal summary ==
Ranking by round

Rank	Nation	Gold	Silver	Bronze	Total
1	Switzerland (SUI)	8	5	4	17
2	Netherlands (NED)	7	3	1	11
3	Japan (JPN)	5	3	1	9
4	Colombia (COL)	4	7	6	17
5	France (FRA)	4	4	8	16
6	Italy (ITA)	2	1	0	3
7	United States (USA)	1	4	0	5
8	Argentina (ARG)	1	0	2	3
9	Latvia (LAT)	0	2	1	3
10	Ecuador (ECU)	0	1	1	2
11	Czech Republic (CZE)	0	1	0	1
11	Sweden (SWE)	0	1	0	1
13	Russia (RUS)	0	0	4	4
14	Belgium (BEL)	0	0	3	3
15	Canada (CAN)	0	0	1	1
Totals (15 entries)		32	32	32	96
