= 2024 UCI BMX Racing World Cup =

- Sport: BMX racing
- Hosts: (New Zealand) Rotorua (Australia) Brisbane (United States) Tulsa
- Duration: 10 February – 28 April
- Men Elite: (gold) (Australia) Izaac Kennedy; (silver) (Switzerland) Cédric Butti; (bronze) (Netherlands) Niek Kimmann
- Women Elite: (gold) (Australia) Saya Sakakibara; (silver) (Netherlands) Manon Veenstra; (bronze) (United States) Alise Willoughby
- Men Under 23: (gold) (Australia) Oliver Moran; (silver) (New Zealand) Bennett Greenough; (bronze) (Australia) Jesse Asmus
- Women Under 23: (gold) (Australia) Teya Rufus; (silver) (Australia) Isabell May; (bronze) (Latvia) Veronika Stūriška

Seasons
- ← 2023 2025 →

The 2024 UCI BMX Racing World Cup is the annual edition of the UCI BMX Racing World Cup in the Olympic bmx racing event, governed by the UCI.

== Calendar ==
The calendar for the 2024 UCI BMX Racing World Cup include 3 stages (6 rounds).

Date	Location	Ref.
10–11 February	Rotorua, New Zealand	
24–25 February	Brisbane, Australia	
27–28 April	Tulsa, United States	

== Results ==
=== Men's elite ===
Stage	Venue	1st place, gold medalist(s)	2nd place, silver medalist(s)	3rd place, bronze medalist(s)
1	(New Zealand) Rotorua	Romain Mahieu (FRA)	Joris Daudet (FRA)	Simon Marquart (SUI)
2	(New Zealand) Rotorua	Joris Daudet (FRA)	Cédric Butti (SUI)	Niek Kimmann (NED)
3	(Australia) Brisbane	Izaac Kennedy (AUS)	Ross Cullen (GBR)	Jeremy Smith (USA)
4	(Australia) Brisbane	Kye Whyte (GBR)	Cédric Butti (SUI)	Carlos Ramírez (COL)
5	(United States) Tulsa	Niek Kimmann (NED)	Izaac Kennedy (AUS)	Cédric Butti (SUI)
6	(United States) Tulsa	Niek Kimmann (NED)	Izaac Kennedy (AUS)	Kamren Larsen (USA)

=== Women's elite ===
Stage	Venue	1st place, gold medalist(s)	2nd place, silver medalist(s)	3rd place, bronze medalist(s)
1	(New Zealand) Rotorua	Saya Sakakibara (AUS)	Laura Smulders (NED)	Beth Shriever (GBR)
2	(New Zealand) Rotorua	Saya Sakakibara (AUS)	Beth Shriever (GBR)	Manon Veenstra (NED)
3	(Australia) Brisbane	Zoé Claessens (SUI)	Saya Sakakibara (AUS)	Manon Veenstra (NED)
4	(Australia) Brisbane	Zoé Claessens (SUI)	Saya Sakakibara (AUS)	Alise Willoughby (USA)
5	(United States) Tulsa	Saya Sakakibara (AUS)	Manon Veenstra (NED)	Alise Willoughby (USA)
6	(United States) Tulsa	Saya Sakakibara (AUS)	Alise Willoughby (USA)	Sienna Pal (AUS)

=== Men under 23 ===
Stage	Venue	1st place, gold medalist(s)	2nd place, silver medalist(s)	3rd place, bronze medalist(s)
1	(New Zealand) Rotorua	Jack Greenough (NZL)	Bennett Greenough (NZL)	Noah Elton (AUS)
2	(New Zealand) Rotorua	Bennett Greenough (NZL)	Oliver Moran (AUS)	Joshua Jolly (AUS)
3	(Australia) Brisbane	Jesse Asmus (AUS)	Oliver Moran (AUS)	Marco Radaelli (ITA)
4	(Australia) Brisbane	Oliver Moran (AUS)	Marcus Leth (DEN)	Bennett Greenough (NZL)
5	(United States) Tulsa	Jordan Callum (AUS)	Tasman Wakelin (NZL)	Joshua Jolly (AUS)
6	(United States) Tulsa	Oliver Moran (AUS)	Jesse Asmus (AUS)	Jordan Callum (AUS)

=== Women under 23 ===
Stage	Venue	1st place, gold medalist(s)	2nd place, silver medalist(s)	3rd place, bronze medalist(s)
1	(New Zealand) Rotorua	Teya Rufus (AUS)	Ava Corley (USA)	Jui Yabuta (JPN)
2	(New Zealand) Rotorua	Ava Corley (USA)	Isabell May (AUS)	Teya Rufus (AUS)
3	(Australia) Brisbane	Teya Rufus (AUS)	Isabell May (AUS)	Aiko Gommers (BEL)
4	(Australia) Brisbane	Teya Rufus (AUS)	Isabell May (AUS)	Emily Hutt (GBR)
5	(United States) Tulsa	Teya Rufus (AUS)	Grecia Cristodulo (BOL)	Valerie Vossen (BEL)
6	(United States) Tulsa	McKenzie Gayheart (USA)	Sabina Košárková (CZE)	Sharid Fayad (COL)

== Standings ==
Standings after round 6 in Tulsa.

=== Men elite ===
Pos.	Racer	Points
1	Izaac Kennedy (AUS)	1787
2	Cédric Butti (SUI)	1764
3	Niek Kimmann (NED)	1456
4	Kamren Larsen (USA)	1178
5	Simon Marquart (SUI)	1172
6	Carlos Ramírez (COL)	1143
7	Joris Daudet (FRA)	1104
8	Kye Whyte (GBR)	1026
9	Jérémy Rencurel (FRA)	948
10	Jeremy Smith (USA)	899

=== Women elite ===
Pos.	Racer	Points
1	Saya Sakakibara (AUS)	2860
2	Manon Veenstra (NED)	1996
3	Alise Willoughby (USA)	1880
4	Beth Shriever (GBR)	1488
5	Zoé Claessens (SUI)	1273
6	Molly Simpson (CAN)	1270
7	Felicia Stancil (USA)	1134
8	Merel Smulders (NED)	948
9	Lauren Reynolds (AUS)	947
10	Mariana Pajón (COL)	911

=== Men Under 23 ===
Pos.	Racer	Points
1	Oliver Moran (AUS)	719
2	Bennett Greenough (NZL)	622
3	Jesse Asmus (AUS)	527
4	Jordan Callum (AUS)	494
5	Joshua Jolly (AUS)	460
6	Federico Capello (ARG)	432
7	Jack Greenough (NZL)	420
8	James Williams (USA)	417
9	Marco Radaelli (ITA)	370
10	Marcus Leth (DEN)	306

=== Women Under 23 ===
Pos.	Racer	Points
1	Teya Rufus (AUS)	849
2	Isabell May (AUS)	651
3	Veronika Stūriška (LAT)	428
4	Emily Hutt (GBR)	422
5	Sabina Koŝárková (CZE)	379
6	Jui Yabuta (JPN)	325
7	Aiko Gommers (BEL)	321
8	Teigen Pascual (CAN)	312
9	Ava Corley (USA)	307
10	Mariane Beltrando (FRA)	235

== Medal summary ==
Ranking by round

Rank	Nation	Gold	Silver	Bronze	Total
1	Australia (AUS)	13	10	6	29
2	United States (USA)	2	2	4	8
3	Netherlands (NED)	2	2	3	7
4	Switzerland (SUI)	2	2	2	6
5	New Zealand (NZL)	2	2	1	5
6	France (FRA)	2	1	0	3
7	Great Britain (GBR)	1	2	2	5
8	Bolivia (BOL)	0	1	0	1
8	Czech Republic (CZE)	0	1	0	1
8	Denmark (DEN)	0	1	0	1
11	Belgium (BEL)	0	0	2	2
11	Colombia (COL)	0	0	2	2
13	Italy (ITA)	0	0	1	1
13	Japan (JPN)	0	0	1	1
Totals (14 entries)		24	24	24	72
