= Cycling at the 2019 Pan American Games – Men's BMX racing =

Men's BMX racing at the 2019 Pan American Games
- Venue: Circuito BMX
- Dates: August 8–9
- Competitors: 23 from 14 nations
- Winning time: 32.113

Medalists
| Gold medal | Alfredo Campo; Ecuador |
| Silver medal | Anderson Ezequiel de Souza Filho; Brazil |
| Bronze medal | Federico Villegas; Argentina |

The men's BMX racing competition of the cycling events at the 2019 Pan American Games was held on August 8 and August 9 at the Circuito BMX.

== Schedule ==
| Date | Time | Round |
|---|---|---|
| August 8, 2019 | 11:55 | Time Trials |
| August 9, 2019 | 11:00 | Quarterfinals |
| August 9, 2019 | 12:36 | Semifinals |
| August 9, 2019 | 14:05 | Final |

== Results ==
=== Time Trials ===
23 riders from 14 countries was started

| Rank | Name | Nation | Time |
|---|---|---|---|
| 1 | Diego Arboleda | Colombia | 33.153 |
| 2 | Gonzalo Molina | Argentina | 33.224 |
| 3 | Alfredo Campo | Ecuador | 33.153 |
| 4 | Anderson Ezequiel de Souza Filho | Brazil | 33.224 |
| 5 | James Palmer | Canada | 33.618 |
| 6 | Carlos Ramírez | Colombia | 33.690 |
| 7 | Renato Rezende | Brazil | 33.698 |
| 8 | Jefferson Milano | Venezuela | 33.775 |
| 9 | Federico Villegas | Argentina | 34.035 |
| 10 | Rubén García | Venezuela | 34.163 |
| 11 | Cameron Wood | United States | 34.600 |
| 12 | Emilio Falla | Ecuador | 34.779 |
| 13 | Hernán Godoy | Chile | 35.030 |
| 14 | Mauricio Molina | Chile | 35.286 |
| 15 | Feddison Flanders | Aruba | 35.435 |
| 16 | Jaime Quintanilla | Bolivia | 35.897 |
| 17 | Óscar Otero | Mexico | 36.550 |
| 18 | Igor Vaca | Bolivia | 36.790 |
| 19 | Cameron Bramer | United States | 36.814 |
| 20 | André Lacroix | Peru | 37.089 |
| 21 | Sergio Marroquín | Guatemala | 37.439 |
| 22 | Maikol Cordero | Costa Rica | 38.927 |
| 23 | Kevin Mireles | Mexico | 59.743 |

=== Quarterfinals ===
First 4 riders in each quarterfinal qualify to semifinal.

==== Quarterfinal 1 ====
| Rank | Name | Nation | Race 1 | Race 2 | Race 3 | Points | Notes |
|---|---|---|---|---|---|---|---|
| 1 | Diego Arboleda | Colombia | 33.391 (1) | 33.133 (1) | 32.759 (1) | 3 | Q |
| 2 | Federico Villegas | Argentina | 33.943 (2) | 33.604 (3) | 33.353 (2) | 7 | Q |
| 3 | Jefferson Milano | Venezuela | 34.308 (3) | 33.414 (2) | 33.363 (3) | 8 | Q |
| 4 | Jaime Quintanilla | Bolivia | 35.301 (4) | 35.110 (4) | 35.168 (4) | 12 | Q |
| 5 | Óscar Otero | Mexico | 36.304 (5) | 35.787 (5) | 35.207 (5) | 15 | |

==== Quarterfinal 2 ====
| Rank | Name | Nation | Race 1 | Race 2 | Race 3 | Points | Notes |
|---|---|---|---|---|---|---|---|
| 1 | Gonzalo Molina | Argentina | 33.870 (2) | 33.371 (1) | 33.156 (1) | 4 | Q |
| 2 | Renato Rezende | Brazil | 33.769 (1) | 33.639 (2) | 33.246 (2) | 5 | Q |
| 3 | Rubén García | Venezuela | 48.937 (4) | 34.565 (3) | 34.050 (3) | 10 | Q |
| 4 | Feddison Flanders | Aruba | 37.681 (3) | 35.650 (4) | 34.660 (4) | 11 | Q |
| 5 | Igor Vaca | Bolivia | 53.109 (5) | 36.965 (5) | 35.872 (5) | 15 | |
| 6 | Kevin Mireles | Mexico | 57.954 (6) | DNS (8) | DNS (8) | 22 | |

==== Quarterfinal 3 ====
| Rank | Name | Nation | Race 1 | Race 2 | Race 3 | Points | Notes |
|---|---|---|---|---|---|---|---|
| 1 | Alfredo Campo | Ecuador | 33.489 (1) | 33.400 (1) | 32.684 (1) | 3 | Q |
| 2 | Carlos Ramírez | Colombia | 33.574 (2) | 33.472 (2) | 33.250 (2) | 6 | Q |
| 3 | Mauricio Molina | Chile | 34.780 (4) | 34.487 (3) | 33.776 (3) | 10 | Q |
| 4 | Cameron Wood | United States | 33.950 (3) | 34.827 (4) | 34.173 (4) | 11 | Q |
| 5 | Cameron Bramer | United States | 36.329 (5) | 36.182 (5) | 35.775 (5) | 15 | |
| 6 | Maikol Cordero | Costa Rica | 37.145 (6) | 1:01.874 (6) | 37.755 (6) | 18 | |

==== Quarterfinal 4 ====
| Rank | Name | Nation | Race 1 | Race 2 | Race 3 | Points | Notes |
|---|---|---|---|---|---|---|---|
| 1 | James Palmer | Canada | 34.610 (1) | 33.648 (1) | 33.554 (1) | 3 | Q |
| 2 | Anderson Ezequiel de Souza Filho | Brazil | 34.724 (2) | 34.625 (3) | 33.795 (2) | 7 | Q |
| 3 | Emilio Falla | Ecuador | 35.110 (3) | 34.245 (2) | 34.308 (3) | 8 | Q |
| 4 | Hernán Godoy | Chile | 36.398 (4) | 36.050 (4) | 35.349 (4) | 12 | Q |
| 5 | Sergio Marroquín | Guatemala | 43.757 (5) | 48.860 (6) | 36.496 (5) | 16 | |
| 6 | André Lacroix | Peru | 2:08.297 (6) | 38.852 (5) | 38.919 (6) | 17 | |

=== Semifinals ===
First 4 riders in each semifinal qualify to final.

==== Semifinal 1 ====
| Rank | Name | Nation | Race 1 | Race 2 | Race 3 | Points | Notes |
|---|---|---|---|---|---|---|---|
| 1 | Alfredo Campo | Ecuador | 32.753 (1) | 32.710 (1) | 32.316 (1) | 3 | Q |
| 2 | Jefferson Milano | Venezuela | 33.182 (2) | 33.589 (5) | 32.783 (2) | 9 | Q |
| 3 | Renato Rezende | Brazil | 33.529 (4) | 32.996 (2) | 32.876 (3) | 9 | Q |
| 4 | Anderson Ezequiel de Souza Filho | Brazil | 33.392 (3) | 33.109 (3) | 33.198 (4) | 10 | Q |
| 5 | Diego Arboleda | Colombia | 33.558 (5) | 33.124 (4) | DNF (8) | 17 | |
| 6 | Mauricio Molina | Chile | 34.527 (7) | 34.031 (6) | 34.552 (5) | 18 | |
| 7 | Feddison Flanders | Aruba | 34.355 (6) | 34.707 (7) | 2:39.419(7) | 20 | |
| 8 | Hernán Godoy | Chile | 35.137 (8) | 35.477 (8) | 40.000 (6) | 22 | |

==== Semifinal 2 ====
| Rank | Name | Nation | Race 1 | Race 2 | Race 3 | Points | Notes |
|---|---|---|---|---|---|---|---|
| 1 | Gonzalo Molina | Argentina | 32.893 (1) | 32.961 (1) | 33.013 (2) | 4 | Q |
| 2 | Federico Villegas | Argentina | 32.955 (2) | 33.255 (3) | 32.999 (1) | 6 | Q |
| 3 | Carlos Ramírez | Colombia | 33.139 (3) | 33.142 (2) | 33.185 (3) | 8 | Q |
| 4 | James Palmer | Canada | 33.775 (4) | 33.765 (4) | 34.589 (4) | 12 | Q |
| 5 | Rubén García | Venezuela | 33.829 (5)) | 33.936 (5) | 51.331 (8) | 18 | |
| 6 | Emilio Falla | Ecuador | 54.780 (8) | 34.450 (6) | 34.641 (5) | 19 | |
| 7 | Jaime Quintanilla | Bolivia | 36.123 (6) | 36.045 (7) | 38.063 (7) | 20 | |
| 8 | Cameron Wood | United States | 36.438 (7) | 1:46.509 (8) | 35.618 (6) | 21 | |

=== Final ===
| Rank | Name | Nation | Time | Notes |
|---|---|---|---|---|
| 1st place, gold medalist(s) | Alfredo Campo | Ecuador | 32.113 | |
| 2nd place, silver medalist(s) | Anderson Ezequiel de Souza Filho | Brazil | 32.493 | |
| 3rd place, bronze medalist(s) | Federico Villegas | Argentina | 32.714 | |
| 4 | Renato Rezende | Brazil | 32.957 | |
| 5 | James Palmer | Canada | 33.389 | |
| | Jefferson Milano | Venezuela | DNF | |
| | Gonzalo Molina | Argentina | DNF | |
| | Carlos Ramírez | Colombia | DNF | |
