= Cycling at the 2023 Pan American Games – Men's BMX racing =

Men's BMX racing at the 2023 Pan American Games
- Venue: San Cristóbal Metropolitan Park
- Dates: October 21 - October 22
- Competitors: 20 from 10 nations
- Winning time: 31.810

Medalists
Gold medal	Kamren Larsen	United States
Silver medal	Cameron Wood	United States
Bronze medal	Carlos Ramírez	Colombia

The men's BMX racing competition of the cycling events at the 2023 Pan American Games was held from October 21 to 22 at the San Cristóbal Metropolitan Park in Santiago, Chile.

== Schedule ==
Date	Time	Round
October 21, 2023	11:55	Seeding Run
October 22, 2023	11:09	Quarterfinals - Run 1
October 22, 2023	11:39	Quarterfinals - Run 2
October 22, 2023	12:09	Quarterfinals - Run 3
October 22, 2023	12:54	Semifinals - Run 1
October 22, 2023	13:26	Semifinals - Run 2
October 22, 2023	13:52	Semifinals - Run 3
October 22, 2023	14:35	Final

== Results ==
=== Seeding run ===
20 riders from 10 countries was started:

Rank	Name	Nation	Time
1	Cameron Wood	United States	31.800
2	Diego Arboleda	Colombia	32.040
3	Gonzalo Molina	Argentina	32.260
4	Kamren Larsen	United States	32.650
5	Carlos Ramírez	Colombia	32.680
6	Emiliano de la Fuente	Argentina	32.750
7	Wilson Goyes	Ecuador	32.950
8	Pedro Santos	Brazil	33.010
9	Mauricio Molina	Chile	33.100
10	Ryan Tougas	Canada	33.120
11	Bruno Andrade	Brazil	33.130
12	Benjamín Vergara	Chile	33.150
13	Cristhian Castro	Ecuador	33.220
14	Curtis Krey	Canada	33.310
15	Jholman Sivira	Venezuela	33.760
16	José Mamani	Peru	34.250
17	Jefferson Milano	Venezuela	34.260
18	André Lacroix	Peru	34.740
19	Nicolás Arze	Bolivia	37.110
20	Sebastián Arze	Bolivia	37.340

=== Quarterfinals ===
First 4 riders in each quarterfinal qualify to semifinal.

==== Quarterfinal 1 ====
Rank	Name	Nation	Race 1	Race 2	Race 3	Total	Notes
1	Cameron Wood	United States	32.400 (1)	33.700 (1)	45.800 (5)	7	Q
2	Mauricio Molina	Chile	33.100 (2)	59.100 (5)	33.200 (1)	8	Q
2	Pedro Santos	Brazil	33.400 (3)	34.100 (2)	34.000 (3)	8	Q
4	Jefferson Milano	Venezuela	34.000 (4)	36.800 (3)	33.900 (2)	9	Q
5	José Mamani	Peru	34.400 (5)	44.500 (4)	37.000 (4)	13	

==== Quarterfinal 2 ====
Rank	Name	Nation	Race 1	Race 2	Race 3	Total	Notes
1	Diego Arboleda	Colombia	32.500 (1)	32.600 (1)	32.600 (1)	3	Q
2	Jholman Sivira	Venezuela	33.000 (2)	33.500 (4)	33.300 (2)	8	Q
2	Wilson Goyes	Ecuador	33.200 (3)	32.700 (2)	33.500 (3)	8	Q
4	Ryan Tougas	Canada	33.400 (4)	32.900 (3)	33.700 (4)	11	Q
5	André Lacroix	Peru	33.800 (5)	33.900 (5)	34.800 (5)	15	

==== Quarterfinal 3 ====
Rank	Name	Nation	Race 1	Race 2	Race 3	Total	Notes
1	Gonzalo Molina	Argentina	32.400 (1)	1:33.700 (5)	32.500 (1)	7	Q
1	Emiliano de la Fuente	Argentina	32.600 (2)	35.400 (3)	32.700 (2)	7	Q
1	Bruno Andrade	Brazil	33.200 (3)	33.900 (1)	32.800 (3)	7	Q
4	Curtis Krey	Canada	33.400 (4)	35.300 (2)	33.700 (4)	10	Q
5	Nicolás Arze	Bolivia	35.800 (5)	37.400 (4)	36.200 (5)	14	

==== Quarterfinal 4 ====
Rank	Name	Nation	Race 1	Race 2	Race 3	Total	Notes
1	Carlos Ramírez	Colombia	32.500 (1)	33.100 (2)	32.400 (1)	4	Q
2	Kamren Larsen	United States	32.700 (2)	32.400 (1)	33.000 (2)	5	Q
3	Benjamín Vergara	Chile	33.400 (3)	33.600 (3)	33.100 (3)	9	Q
4	Cristhian Castro	Ecuador	34.200 (4)	34.400 (4)	34.900 (4)	12	Q
5	Sebastián Arze	Bolivia	35.800 (5)	35.800 (5)	36.400 (5)	15	

=== Semifinals ===
First 4 riders in each semifinal qualify to final.

==== Semifinal 1 ====
Rank	Name	Nation	Race 1	Race 2	Race 3	Total	Notes
1	Cameron Wood	United States	32.000 (1)	32.200 (1)	32.200 (1)	3	Q
2	Emiliano de la Fuente	Argentina	32.700 (3)	32.700 (2)	32.400 (2)	7	Q
3	Carlos Ramírez	Colombia	32.300 (2)	32.760 (3)	32.600 (3)	8	Q
4	Benjamín Vergara	Chile	43.500 (5)	33.900 (4)	33.600 (5)	14	Q
5	Ryan Tougas	Canada	39.000 (4)	34.500 (5)	34.000 (6)	15	
6	Curtis Krey	Canada	47.100 (6)	34.580 (6)	33.400 (4)	16	
7	Pedro Santos	Brazil	52.300 (7)	35.100 (7)	34.400 (7)	21	
8	Jholman Sivira	Venezuela	DNF (8)	DNF (8)	54.300 (8)	24	

==== Semifinal 2 ====
Rank	Name	Nation	Race 1	Race 2	Race 3	Total	Notes
1	Diego Arboleda	Colombia	33.740 (4)	31.500 (1)	32.000 (1)	6	Q
2	Kamren Larsen	United States	32.900 (1)	31.700 (2)	33.000 (5)	8	Q
3	Gonzalo Molina	Argentina	33.810 (5)	32.100 (3)	32.400 (2)	10	Q
4	Mauricio Molina	Chile	33.700 (3)	32.810 (4)	32.530 (4)	11	Q
5	Wilson Goyes	Ecuador	33.100 (2)	33.400 (7)	32.520 (3)	12	
6	Cristhian Castro	Ecuador	33.860 (6)	33.200 (6)	33.400 (6)	18	
7	Bruno Andrade	Brazil	34.100 (7)	32.860 (5)	33.700 (7)	19	
8	Jefferson Milano	Venezuela	DNF (8)	DNF (8)	DNF (8)	24	

=== Final ===
Rank	Name	Nation	Time	Notes
1st place, gold medalist(s)	Kamren Larsen	United States	31.810	
2nd place, silver medalist(s)	Cameron Wood	United States	31.860	
3rd place, bronze medalist(s)	Carlos Ramírez	Colombia	32.400	
4	Diego Arboleda	Colombia	32.800	
5	Mauricio Molina	Chile	33.900	
6	Emiliano de la Fuente	Argentina	34.200	
7	Benjamín Vergara	Chile	1:10.000	
8	Gonzalo Molina	Argentina	1:44.800	
