= Mauricio Molina (disambiguation) =

Mauricio Molina (born 1980) is a Colombian former professional footballer.

Mauricio Molina may also refer to:

- Mauricio Molina Ahumada, Chilean historian
- Mauricio Molina (BMX rider), Chilean BMX racer
- Mauricio Molina Delgado, Costa Rican poet; see Costa Rican literature
- Mauricio Molina (golfer), Argentine golfer
