= Cycling at the 2026 South American Games =

Cycling competitions at the 2026 South American Games

- Venue: BMX Park & BMX Race (BMX); Circuito MTB (Mountain biking); Ruta 34 (road cycling); Invencible Velódromo (track cycling)
- Dates: September 14–23

Cycling competitions at the 2026 South American Games in Rosario, Santa Fe, and Rafaela, Argentina, are scheduled to be held between September 14 and 23. The BMX events will take place at BMX Park and BMX Race within Eco Parque. Also within Eco Parque, the track cycling events will take place at Invencible Velódromo. Mountain biking will take place at Circuito MTB while the road cycling events will be held at Ruta 34. All of these venues are located in Rafaela.

A total of 22 events will take place: 2 BMX freestyle, 2 BMX racing, 2 mountain biking, 4 road cycling, and 12 track cycling. The gold medallists for the mountain biking events as well as the winning NOCs in the individual sprint and omnium events will receive a quota for the 2027 Pan American Games cycling competitions. Additionally, the games will give points for the UCI Rankings, used in the qualifications for the BMX and road cycling events.

== Venue ==
(Argentina) Santa Fe
Invencible Velódromo
Capacity: 400

== Medal summary ==
=== Medal table ===
* Host nation (Argentina)

Rank	Nation	Gold	Silver	Bronze	Total
1	Colombia	12	4	2	18
2	Argentina*	4	4	10	18
3	Chile	3	6	1	10
4	Brazil	1	3	3	7
4	Venezuela	1	3	3	7
6	Uruguay	1	0	0	1
7	Ecuador	0	1	0	1
7	Paraguay	0	1	0	1
9	Peru	0	0	2	2
10	Bolivia	0	0	1	1
Totals (10 entries)		22	22	22	66

=== Medalists ===
==== BMX freestyle ====
Event	Gold		Silver		Bronze	
Men's individual	Luis Rincón; Colombia	96.00	Gustavo Oliveira; Brazil	94.67	Manuel Turone; Argentina	91.33
Women's individual	Eduarda Bordignon; Brazil	78.00	Macarena Perez Grasset; Chile	75.00	Lizsurley Villegas; Colombia	73.67

==== BMX racing ====
Event	Gold		Silver		Bronze	
Men's individual	Mateo Carmona; Colombia	31.804	Gonzalo Molina; Argentina	31.924	Jholman Sivira; Venezuela	32.769
Women's individual	Nicole Foronda; Colombia	3 pts	Doménica Mora; Ecuador	8 pts	Paola Reis; Brazil	10 pts

==== Mountain biking ====
Event	Gold		Silver		Bronze	
Men's cross-country	Joel Contreras; Argentina	1:24:27	Alex Malacarne; Brazil	1:24:37	Ulan Bastos Galinski; Brazil	1:26:00
Women's cross-country	Catalina Vidaurre; Chile	1:14:50	Florencia Monsálvez; Chile	1:16:02	Karen Olímpio; Brazil	1:16:19

==== Road cycling ====
Event	Gold		Silver		Bronze	
Men's time trial	Mateo Kalejman; Argentina	54:58.56	Walter Vargas; Colombia	55:27.48	Héctor Quintana; Chile	57:05.59
Men's road race	Guillermo Thomas Silva; Uruguay	3:32:19	Francisco Peñuela; Venezuela	3:32:32	Tomás Contte; Argentina	3:32:33
Women's time trial	Aranza Villalón; Chile	47:35.04	Agua Marina Espínola; Paraguay	47:47.59	Delfina Dibella; Argentina	48:26.52
Women's road race	Julieta Benedetti; Argentina	2:47:47	Lina Hernández; Colombia	2:47:47	Elizabeth Vásquez; Bolivia	2:47:47

==== Track cycling ====
===== Men =====
Event	Gold	Silver	Bronze
Men's individual sprint	Kevin Quintero; Colombia	Cristian Ortega; Colombia	Lucas Vilar; Argentina
Men's keirin	Cristian Ortega; Colombia	Lucas Vilar; Argentina	Juan Rodríguez; Argentina
Men's madison	Rubén Ramos; Marcos Méndez; Argentina	Diego Rojas; Jacob Decar; Chile	Hugo Ruiz; Robinson Ruiz; Peru
Men's omnium	Leangel Linarez; Venezuela	Lucca Marques; Brazil	Hugo Ruiz; Peru
Men's team sprint	Kevin Quintero; Cristian Ortega; Rubén Murillo; Colombia	Andrés Torres; Bladimir Alvarado; Yorber Teran; Venezuela	Lucas Vilar; Matías Murillo; Juan Rodríguez; Iñaki Serrano; Argentina
Men's team pursuit	Jacob Decar; Martín Mancilla; Luciano Carrizo; Diego Rojas; Chile	Juan Esteban Arango; Brayan Sánchez; Anderson Arboleda; Jordan Parra; Colombia	Tomás Moyano; Agustín Ferrari; Marcos Méndez; Rubén Ramos; Santiago Gruñeiro; Argentina

===== Women =====
Event	Gold	Silver	Bronze
Women's individual sprint	Stefany Cuadrado; Colombia	Daniela Colilef; Chile	Natalia Vera; Argentina
Women's keirin	Stefany Cuadrado; Colombia	Natalia Vera; Argentina	Juliana Gaviria; Colombia
Women's madison	Elizabeth Castaño; Lina Hernández; Colombia	Scarlet Cortés; Aranza Villalón; Chile	Maribel Aguirre; Abril Garzon; Argentina
Women's omnium	Lina Hernández; Colombia	Verónica Abreu; Venezuela	Julieta Benedetti; Argentina
Women's team sprint	Mariana Pajón; Juliana Gaviria; Stefany Cuadrado; Manuela Loaiza; Colombia	Guadalupe Díaz; Natalia Vera; Valentina Méndez; Argentina	Michell Manzi; Olviangel Castillo; Carliany Martínez; Venezuela
Women's team pursuit	Lina Hernández; Luciana Osorio; Camila Valbuena; Elizabeth Castaño; Colombia	Scarlet Cortés; Javiera Garrido; Aranza Villalón; Maite Ibarra; Chile	Verónica Abreu; María Daza; Fabiana Candelas; Shantal Zambrano; Venezuela

== Results ==
=== Men's BMX freestyle ===
Rank	Name	Nation	Run 1	Run 2	Score
1st place, gold medalist(s)	Luis Rincón	Colombia	90.00	96.00	96.00
2nd place, silver medalist(s)	Gustavo Oliveira	Brazil	94.67	7.00	94.67
3rd place, bronze medalist(s)	Manuel Turone	Argentina	91.33	25.67	91.33
4	José Manuel Cedano	Chile	13.33	88.67	88.67
5	Mateo Lluberas	Uruguay	85.67	10.33	85.67
6	Job Montañez	Peru	73.67	19.00	73.67
7	Edy Alviarez	Venezuela	54.00	20.33	54.00
8	Elías Medina	Paraguay	29.33	30.33	30.33

=== Women's BMX freestyle ===
Rank	Name	Nation	Run 1	Run 2	Score
1st place, gold medalist(s)	Eduarda Bordignon	Brazil	78.00	15.67	78.00
2nd place, silver medalist(s)	Macarena Perez Grasset	Chile	12.00	75.00	75.00
3rd place, bronze medalist(s)	Lizsurley Villegas	Colombia	73.67	72.83	73.67
4	Analía Zacarías	Argentina	45.33	44.67	45.33

=== Men's BMX racing ===
Seeding run

Rank	Name	Nation	Time	Notes
1	Diego Arboleda	Colombia	31.049	Q
2	Gonzalo Molina	Argentina	31.363	Q
3	Mateo Carmona	Colombia	31.567	Q
4	Pedro Santos	Brazil	31.640	Q
5	Federico Villegas	Argentina	31.816	Q
6	Wilson Goyes	Ecuador	32.196	Q
7	Jholman Sivira	Venezuela	32.794	Q
8	Benjamín Vergara	Chile	33.001	Q
9	Hernán Godoy	Chile	33.298	Q
10	Pedro Benalcazar	Ecuador	33.314	Q
11	André Lacroix	Peru	34.685	Q
12	Alejandro Koochoy	Peru	34.725	Q

Motos

Qualification Rule: Riders ranked 1-8 qualify for the Final; the remainder are eliminated.

Rank	Name	Nation	Run 1			Run 2			Run 3			Total Points	Notes
Rank	Name	Nation	Heat	Time	Pts	Heat	Time	Pts	Heat	Time	Pts	Total Points	Notes
1	Mateo Carmona	Colombia	2	31.941 (1)	1	1	32.057 (2)	1	2	31.856 (2)	1	3	Q
2	Diego Arboleda	Colombia	1	32.092 (3)	1	2	31.942 (1)	1	1	32.296 (4)	2	4	Q
3	Gonzalo Molina	Argentina	2	31.987 (2)	2	2	32.580 (4)	2	1	31.472 (1)	1	5	Q
4	Federico Villegas	Argentina	1	32.783 (5)	3	1	32.057 (2)	1	2	32.138 (3)	2	6	Q
5	Jholman Sivira	Venezuela	2	33.151 (6)	3	2	33.058 (7)	3	2	32.944 (5)	3	9	Q
6	Wilson Goyes	Ecuador	2	33.440 (8)	4	1	32.604 (5)	3	1	32.945 (6)	3	10	Q
7	Pedro Santos	Brazil	1	32.620 (4)	2	1	33.034 (6)	4	1	33.256 (7)	4	10	Q
8	Benjamín Vergara	Chile	1	33.313 (7)	4	2	33.656 (8)	4	1	34.532 (8)	4	12	Q
9	Hernán Godoy	Chile	1	34.638 (11)	6	2	34.276 (9)	5	1	35.328 (10)	5	16	
10	Pedro Benalcazar	Ecuador	2	33.512 (9)	5	1	34.828 (10)	5	2	36.342 (12)	6	16	
11	André Lacroix	Peru	2	34.656 (12)	6	1	35.405 (11)	6	2	34.886 (9)	5	17	
12	Alejandro Koochoy	Peru	1	34.165 (10)	5	2	35.590 (12)	6	1	36.108 (11)	6	17	

Final

Rank	Name	Nation	Time
1st place, gold medalist(s)	Mateo Carmona	Colombia	31.804
2nd place, silver medalist(s)	Gonzalo Molina	Argentina	31.924
3rd place, bronze medalist(s)	Jholman Sivira	Venezuela	32.769
4	Pedro Santos	Brazil	33.445
5	Diego Arboleda	Colombia	33.523
6	Wilson Goyes	Ecuador	33.857
7	Benjamín Vergara	Chile	34.427
8	Federico Villegas	Argentina	36.116

=== Women's BMX racing ===
Seeding run

Rank	Name	Nation	Time	Notes
1	Nicole Foronda	Colombia	36.822	Q
2	Agustina Cavalli	Argentina	37.368	Q
3	Agostina Ruarte	Argentina	37.739	Q
4	Paola Reis	Brazil	38.041	Q
5	Doménica Mora	Ecuador	44.654	Q

Motos

Rank	Name	Nation	Run 1		Run 2		Run 3		Total Points
Rank	Name	Nation	Time	Pts	Time	Pts	Time	Pts	Total Points
1st place, gold medalist(s)	Nicole Foronda	Colombia	36.487	1	36.633	1	37.383	1	3
2nd place, silver medalist(s)	Doménica Mora	Ecuador	37.484	2	38.400	3	38.514	3	7
3rd place, bronze medalist(s)	Paola Reis	Brazil	38.244	3	1:21.124	5	38.194	2	10
4	Agustina Cavalli	Argentina	38.250	4	37.957	2	39.995	5	11
5	Agostina Ruarte	Argentina	39.247	5	39.242	4	39.075	4	13

=== Men's cross country ===
Rank	Name	Nation	Time
1st place, gold medalist(s)	Joel Contreras	Argentina	1:24:27
2nd place, silver medalist(s)	Alex Malacarne	Brazil	1:24:37
3rd place, bronze medalist(s)	Ulan Bastos Galinski	Brazil	1:26:00
4	Iván López	Colombia	1:26:51
5	Jonathan Botero	Colombia	1:26:54
6	Ignacio Gallo	Chile	1:29:04
7	Alexis Quinteros	Ecuador	1:30:36
8	Patricio Farías	Chile	1:31:57
9	Max Loa	Peru	1:32:01
10	Frank Balcón	Peru	1:32:16
11	Eduardo Gelpes	Uruguay	1:32:24
	Agustín Durán	Argentina	DNF

=== Women's cross country ===
Rank	Name	Nation	Time
1st place, gold medalist(s)	Catalina Vidaurre	Chile	1:14:50
2nd place, silver medalist(s)	Florencia Monsálvez	Chile	1:16:02
3rd place, bronze medalist(s)	Karen Olimpio	Brazil	1:16:19
4	Raiza Goulão	Brazil	1:17:18
5	Lucía Miralles	Argentina	1:18:43
6	Gloria Garzón	Colombia	1:19:29
7	Agustina Apaza	Argentina	1:20:30
8	Ana María Roa	Colombia	1:21:18
9	Miryam Núñez	Ecuador	1:23:33
10	Michela Molina	Ecuador	1:24:18
	Mariana Rojas	Peru	LAP

=== Men's time trial ===
Rank	Name	Nation	Time
1st place, gold medalist(s)	Mateo Kalejman	Argentina	54:58.56
2nd place, silver medalist(s)	Walter Vargas	Colombia	55:27.48
3rd place, bronze medalist(s)	Héctor Quintana	Chile	57:05.59
4	Diego de Jesus	Brazil	57:08.33
5	Diego Rojas	Chile	57:14.39
6	Carlos Samudio	Panama	57:21.29
7	João Rossi	Brazil	58:11.70
8	Francisco Peñuela	Venezuela	59:14.90
9	Anderson Arboleda	Colombia	59:21.46
10	Bolívar Espionsa	Panama	1:00:02.14
11	Carlos Domínguez	Paraguay	1:03:14.99
12	Francisco Riveros	Paraguay	1:04:55.44
13	Leangel Linarez	Venezuela	1:05:26.20

=== Women's time trial ===
Rank	Name	Nation	Time
1st place, gold medalist(s)	Aranza Villalón	Chile	47:35.04
2nd place, silver medalist(s)	Agua Marina Espindola	Paraguay	47:47.59
3rd place, bronze medalist(s)	Delfina Dibella	Argentina	48:26.52
4	Diana Peñuela	Colombia	48:40.47
5	Catalina Soto	Chile	48:53.46
6	María Daza	Venezuela	49:48.67
7	Lina Hernández	Colombia	49:56.87
8	Tamires Radatz	Brazil	50:20.38
9	Ana Torres	Ecuador	50:37.12
10	Florencia Revetria	Uruguay	51:13.17
11	Wendy Ducreux	Panama	54:13.49
12	Noemy Atencio	Panama	55:34.33
	Mariana García	Uruguay	DNF
	Lilibeth Chacón	Venezuela	DNS

=== Men's road race ===
Rank	Name	Nation	Time	Behind
1st place, gold medalist(s)	Guillermo Thomas Silva	Uruguay	3:32:19	–
2nd place, silver medalist(s)	Francisco Peñuela	Venezuela	3:32:32	+0:13
3rd place, bronze medalist(s)	Tomás Contte	Argentina	3:32:33	+0:14
4	Jordan Parra	Colombia	3:32:41	+0:22
5	Leonardo Cobarrubia	Argentina	3:32:41	+0:22
6	Carlos Samudio	Panama	3:32:46	+0:27
7	Nicolás Gómez	Colombia	3:32:56	+0:37
8	Ciro Pérez	Uruguay	3:32:57	+0:38
9	Francisco Kotsakis	Chile	3:32:57	+0:38
10	Leangel Linarez	Venezuela	3:32:57	+0:38
11	Gerardo Tivani	Argentina	3:32:57	+0:38
12	Otavio Gonzeli	Brazil	3:32:57	+0:38
13	Facundo Ambrossi	Argentina	3:32:57	+0:38
14	Carlos Acuña	Paraguay	3:32:57	+0:38
15	Brayan Sánchez	Colombia	3:32:58	+0:39
16	Bredio Ruiz	Panama	3:32:58	+0:39
17	José Aramayo	Bolivia	3:32:58	+0:39
18	Robinson Ruiz	Peru	3:32:58	+0:39
19	Byron Guamá	Ecuador	3:32:58	+0:39
20	Cristóbal Baeza	Chile	3:32:58	+0:39
21	Alonso Gamero	Peru	3:32:58	+0:39
22	Alexis Quinteros	Ecuador	3:32:58	+0:39
23	Santiago Montenegro	Ecuador	3:32:58	+0:39
24	Dimas Robin	Peru	3:32:59	+0:40
25	Antonio Alfonso	Paraguay	3:32:59	+0:40
26	Kevin Navas	Ecuador	3:32:59	+0:40
27	David Rojas	Bolivia	3:32:59	+0:40
28	Tomás Quiroz	Chile	3:33:00	+0:41
29	Sandi Guerra	Panama	3:33:02	+0:43
30	Eduardo Moyata	Bolivia	3:33:02	+0:43
31	Mateo Duque	Argentina	3:33:09	+0:50
32	Alaín Quispe	Peru	3:33:09	+0:50
33	Jonathan Monges	Paraguay	3:33:36	+1:17
34	Randish Lorenzo	Panama	3:33:38	+1:19
35	Alex Strah	Panama	3:33:41	+1:22
36	Bolivar Espinosa	Panama	3:33:42	+1:23
37	Carlos Dominguez	Paraguay	3:33:46	+1:27
38	Luis Gómez	Venezuela	3:33:46	+1:27
39	Samuel Reikdal	Brazil	3:33:47	+1:28
40	Anderson Arboleda	Colombia	3:33:47	+1:28
41	Juan Esteban Arango	Colombia	3:33:48	+1:29
42	Francisco Riveros	Paraguay	3:33:57	+1:38
43	Héctor Quintano	Chile	3:33:58	+1:39
44	Luis Mora	Venezuela	3:35:19	+3:00
45	João Rossi	Brazil	3:38:23	+6:04
46	Miguel Peña	Venezuela	3:41:23	+9:04
	Franklin Chacón	Venezuela	DNF	
	Tomás Moyano	Argentina	DNF	
	Lucca Marques	Brazil	DNF	
	Kenny Ferrufino	Bolivia	DNF	
	Diego Rojas	Chile	DNF	
	Hugo Ruiz	Peru	DNF	
	André Gonzáles	Peru	DNF	
	Diego de Jesús	Brazil	DNF	

=== Women's road race ===
Rank	Name	Nation	Time	Behind
1st place, gold medalist(s)	Julieta Benedetti	Argentina	2:47:47	–
2nd place, silver medalist(s)	Lina Hernández	Colombia	2:47:47	+0
3rd place, bronze medalist(s)	Elizabeth Vásquez	Bolivia	2:47:47	+0
4	Tamires Radatz	Brazil	2:47:47	+0
5	Maribel Aguirre	Argentina	2:47:47	+0
6	Catalina Soto	Chile	2:47:47	+0
7	Verónica Abreu	Venezuela	2:47:48	+0:01
8	Paola Silva	Uruguay	2:47:48	+0:01
9	Florencia Revetria	Uruguay	2:47:48	+0:01
10	Sara Torrico	Bolivia	2:47:48	+0:01
11	Marcela Peñafiel	Ecuador	2:47:48	+0:01
12	Lilibeth Chacón	Venezuela	2:47:48	+0:01
13	Michela Molina	Ecuador	2:47:48	+0:01
14	Agua Marina Espindola	Paraguay	2:47:48	+0:01
15	Miryam Núñez	Ecuador	2:47:49	+0:02
16	Carolina Barbosa	Brazil	2:47:49	+0:02
17	Luciana Wynants	Uruguay	2:47:49	+0:02
18	Mariana Rojas	Peru	2:47:49	+0:02
19	Yarela González	Chile	2:47:50	+0:03
20	Juliana Londoño	Colombia	2:47:50	+0:03
21	Wendy Ducreux	Panama	2:47:50	+0:03
22	Mariana García	Uruguay	2:47:50	+0:03
23	Martina Torres	Chile	2:47:50	+0:03
24	Florencia Monsálvez	Chile	2:47:51	+0:04
25	Ludmila Mange	Argentina	2:47:51	+0:04
26	Nicolle Borges	Brazil	2:47:51	+0:04
27	Lívia Leozzi	Brazil	2:47:51	+0:04
28	María Latriglia	Colombia	2:47:51	+0:04
29	Alice Leite	Brazil	2:47:52	+0:05
30	Ana Torres	Ecuador	2:47:55	+0:08
31	Noemy Atencio	Panama	2:48:00	+0:13
32	Valentina Luna	Argentina	2:48:01	+0:14
33	Luciana Osorio	Colombia	2:48:04	+0:17
34	María Daza	Venezuela	2:48:05	+0:18
35	Abril Garzon	Argentina	2:48:07	+0:20
36	Sofia Martelli	Argentina	2:48:07	+0:20
37	Fabiana Candelas	Venezuela	2:48:15	+0:28
38	Camila Valbuena	Colombia	2:48:16	+0:29
39	Elizabeth Castaño	Colombia	2:48:16	+0:29
40	Shantal Zambrano	Venezuela	2:48:27	+0:40
41	Aranza Villalón	Chile	2:48:33	+0:46
42	Kaori Quispe	Peru	2:52:06	+4:19
43	Alejandra Huamaní	Peru	2:52:07	+4:20
	Flor Lewis	Peru	OTL	

=== Men's individual sprint ===
Qualification

Rank	Name	Nation	Time	Notes
1	Cristian Ortega	Colombia	9.657	Q
2	Kevin Quintero	Colombia	9.768	Q
3	Andrés Torres	Venezuela	9.854	Q
3	Lucas Vilar	Argentina	9.854	Q
5	Juan Rodríguez	Argentina	9.993	Q
6	Yorber Teran	Venezuela	10.019	Q
7	João da Silva	Brazil	10.130	Q
8	Francis Cachique	Peru	10.193	Q
9	Rubén Murillo	Colombia	10.282	Q
10	Roberto Castillo	Chile	10.382	Q
11	Bladimir Alvarado	Venezuela	10.420	Q
12	Matías Murillo	Argentina	10.446	Q
13	Camilo Palacios	Chile	10.600	Q
14	Vicente Araya	Chile	10.743	Q
15	Alexis Domínguez	Paraguay	10.894	Q
16	Isaías Melgarejo	Paraguay	10.898	Q
17	Xavi Wadilie	Suriname	10.903	
18	Luca Bogado	Paraguay	10.950	

1/8 Finals

Heat	Rank	Name	Nation	Result
1	1	Cristian Ortega	Colombia	Q
1	2	Isaías Melgarejo	Paraguay	+0.456
2	1	Kevin Quintero	Colombia	Q
2	2	Alexis Domínguez	Paraguay	+3.486
3	1	Andrés Torres	Venezuela	Q
3	2	Vicente Araya	Chile	+0.568
4	1	Lucas Vilar	Argentina	Q
4	2	Camilo Palacios	Chile	+0.018
5	1	Juan Rodríguez	Argentina	Q
5	2	Matías Murillo	Argentina	+0.249
6	1	Yorber Teran	Venezuela	Q
6	2	Bladimir Alvarado	Venezuela	+0.147
7	1	João da Silva	Brazil	Q
7	2	Roberto Castillo	Chile	+0.411
8	1	Rubén Murillo	Colombia	Q
8	2	Francis Cachique	Peru	+0.184

Quarterfinals

Heat	Rank	Name	Nation	Race 1	Race 2	Notes
1	1	Cristian Ortega	Colombia			Q
1	2	Rubén Murillo	Colombia	+0.452	+0.303	
2	1	Kevin Quintero	Colombia			Q
2	2	João da Silva	Brazil	+0.079	+0.139	
3	1	Yorber Teran	Venezuela			Q
3	2	Andrés Torres	Venezuela	+0.043	+0.110	
4	1	Lucas Vilar	Argentina			Q
4	2	Juan Rodríguez	Argentina	+0.134	+0.087	

Semifinals

Heat	Rank	Name	Nation	Race 1	Race 2	Notes
1	1	Cristian Ortega	Colombia			Q
1	2	Lucas Vilar	Argentina	+0.119	+0.018	
2	1	Kevin Quintero	Colombia			Q
3	1	Yorber Teran	Venezuela	+0.078	+6.914	

Finals

Rank	Name	Nation	Race 1	Race 2	Race 3
1st place, gold medalist(s)	Kevin Quintero	Colombia			
2nd place, silver medalist(s)	Cristian Ortega	Colombia	REL	+0.108	
3rd place, bronze medalist(s)	Lucas Vilar	Argentina	+0.003		
4	Yorber Teran	Venezuela		+0.028	+17.359

=== Men's keirin ===
First round

Rank	Name	Nation	Time Behind	Notes
Heat 1
1	Kevin Quintero	Colombia		Q
2	João da Silva	Brazil	+0.508	Q
3	Juan Rodríguez	Argentina	+0.540	Q
4	Vicente Araya	Chile	+0.571	
5	Bladimir Alvarado	Venezuela	+0.723	
6	Alexis Domínguez	Paraguay	+0.751	
Heat 2
1	Lucas Vilar	Argentina		Q
2	Andrés Torres	Venezuela	+0.112	Q
3	Cristian Ortega	Colombia	+0.156	Q
4	Francis Cachique	Peru	+0.295	
5	Camilo Palacios	Chile	+0.452	
6	Isaías Melgarejo	Paraguay	+0.859	
7	Xavi Wadilie	Suriname	+0.914	

Final for places 7-12

Rank	Name	Nation	Time Behind
1	Francis Cachique	Peru	
2	Camilo Palacios	Chile	+0.010
3	Bladimir Alvarado	Venezuela	+0.226
4	Isaías Melgarejo	Paraguay	+0.392
5	Vicente Araya	Chile	+0.428
6	Alexis Domínguez	Paraguay	+0.429

Final for Gold

Rank	Name	Nation	Time Behind
1st place, gold medalist(s)	Cristian Ortega	Colombia	
2nd place, silver medalist(s)	Lucas Vilar	Argentina	+0.097
3rd place, bronze medalist(s)	Juan Rodríguez	Argentina	+0.202
4	João da Silva	Brazil	+0.231
5	Kevin Quintero	Colombia	+8.981
6	Andrés Torres	Venezuela	REL

=== Men's madison ===
Rank	Name	Nation	Points	Notes
1st place, gold medalist(s)	Rubén Ramos; Marcos Méndez	Argentina	43	
2nd place, silver medalist(s)	Diego Rojas; Jacob Decar	Chile	31	
3rd place, bronze medalist(s)	Hugo Ruiz; Robinson Ruiz	Peru	31	
4	Jordan Parra; Juan Arango	Colombia	29	
5	Otávio Gonzeli; Samuel Reikdal	Brazil	28	
	Franklin Chacón; Miguel Peña	Venezuela	DNF	

=== Men's omnium ===
Rank	Name	Nation	Scratch	Tempo	Elimination	Points Race	Total
1st place, gold medalist(s)	Leangel Linarez	Venezuela	28	40	36	54	158
2nd place, silver medalist(s)	Lucca Marques	Brazil	34	36	32	35	137
3rd place, bronze medalist(s)	Hugo Ruiz	Peru	30	DNF	30	76	136
4	Juan Esteban Arango	Colombia	32	32	38	33	135
5	Jacob Decar	Chile	40	34	34	26	134
6	Tomás Moyano	Argentina	36	38	40	11	125
7	Carlos Dominguez	Paraguay	38	32	28	26	125
8	Alejandro Pita	Ecuador	26	28	26	-37	43

=== Men's team pursuit ===
Rank	Name	Nation	Qualifying			Final	
Rank	Name	Nation	Time	Rank	Notes	Time	Notes
1st place, gold medalist(s)	Jacob Decar; Martín Mancilla; Luciano Carrizo; Diego Rojas	Chile	3:56.973	1	QG		
2nd place, silver medalist(s)	Juan Esteban Arango; Brayan Sánchez; Anderson Arboleda; Jordan Parra	Colombia	4:01.717	2	QG	OVL	
3rd place, bronze medalist(s)	Tomás Moyano (F); Agustín Ferrari; Marcos Méndez; Rubén Ramos; Santiago Gruñeiro	Argentina	4:03.422	3	QB		
4	Miguel Peña; Franklin Chacón; Leangel Linarez; Luis Gómez	Venezuela	4:11.876	4	QB	OVL	

=== Men's team sprint ===
Rank	Name	Nation	Qualifying			Final	
Rank	Name	Nation	Time	Rank	Notes	Time	Notes
1st place, gold medalist(s)	Kevin Quintero; Cristian Ortega; Rubén Murillo	Colombia	44.248	1	QG	43.693	
2nd place, silver medalist(s)	Andrés Torres; Bladimir Alvarado; Yorber Teran	Venezuela	44.252	2	QG	43.813	
3rd place, bronze medalist(s)	Lucas Vilar; Matías Murillo; Juan Rodríguez; Iñaki Serrano (F)	Argentina	44.393	3	QB	44.758	
4	Vicente Araya; Roberto Castillo; Camilo Palacios	Chile	46.522	4	QB	46.595	
5	Isaías Melgarejo; Alexis Domínguez; Luca Bogado	Paraguay	48.279	5			

=== Women's individual sprint ===
Qualification

1st and 2nd riders qualify to 1/4. From 3 to 14 riders qualify for Repechage.

Rank	Name	Nation	Time	Notes
1	Stefany Cuadrado	Colombia	10.658	Q
2	Valentina Méndez	Argentina	11.000	Q
3	Juliana Gaviria	Colombia	11.028	Q
4	Natalia Vera	Argentina	11.042	Q
5	Michell Manzi	Venezuela	11.139	Q
6	Manuela Loaiza	Colombia	11.256	Q
7	Daniela Colilef	Chile	11.338	Q
8	Olviangel Castillo	Venezuela	11.454	Q
9	Ruth Perdomo	Ecuador	11.537	Q
10	Paula Molina	Chile	11.570	Q
11	Paola Muñoz	Chile	11.655	Q
12	Guadalupe Díaz	Argentina	11.725	Q
13	Carliany Martínez	Venezuela	11.792	Q
14	Luz Loayza	Peru	12.419	Q

Repechage

The winner of each heat q;alifies to the Q;arterfinals.

Heat	Rank	Name	Nation	Result
1	1	Juliana Gaviria	Colombia	Q
1	2	Luz Loayza	Peru	+0.591
2	1	Natalia Vera	Argentina	Q
2	2	Carliany Martínez	Venezuela	+0.113
3	1	Michell Manzi	Venezuela	Q
3	2	Guadalupe Díaz	Argentina	+0.487
4	1	Manuela Loaiza	Colombia	Q
4	2	Paola Muñoz	Chile	+0.098
5	1	Daniela Colilef	Chile	Q
5	2	Paula Molina	Chile	+0.143
6	1	Ruth Perdomo	Ecuador	Q
6	2	Olviangel Castillo	Venezuela	+0.615

Quarterfinals

Heat	Rank	Name	Nation	Race 1	Race 2	Race 3	Notes
1	1	Stefany Cuadrado	Colombia				Q
1	2	Ruth Perdomo	Ecuador	+0.436	+3.559		
2	1	Daniela Colilef	Chile		+0.198		Q
2	2	Valentina Méndez	Argentina	+0.113		+0.027	
3	1	Juliana Gaviria	Colombia				Q
3	2	Manuela Loaiza	Colombia	+0.067	+0.021		
4	1	Natalia Vera	Argentina				Q
4	2	Michell Manzi	Venezuela	+0.095	+0.158		

Semifinals

Heat	Rank	Name	Nation	Race 1	Race 2	Race 3	Notes
1	1	Stefany Cuadrado	Colombia				Q
1	2	Natalia Vera	Argentina	+0.188	+0.202		
2	1	Daniela Colilef	Chile	REL			Q
3	1	Juliana Gaviria	Colombia		+0.106	+0.169	

Finals

Rank	Name	Nation	Race 1	Race 2
1st place, gold medalist(s)	Stefany Cuadrado	Colombia		
2nd place, silver medalist(s)	Daniela Colilef	Chile	+7.654	+0.142
3rd place, bronze medalist(s)	Natalia Vera	Argentina		
4	Juliana Gaviria	Colombia	+1.703	+0.150

=== Women's keirin ===
First round

Rank	Name	Nation	Time Behind	Notes
Heat 1
1	Stefany Cuadrado	Colombia		Q
2	Valentina Méndez	Argentina	+0.730	Q
3	Carliany Martínez	Venezuela	+0.972	Q
4	Daniela Colilef	Chile	+1.043	
5	Ruth Perdomo	Ecuador	+2.212	
Heat 2
1	Juliana Gaviria	Colombia		Q
2	Michell Manzi	Venezuela	+0.101	Q
3	Natalia Vera	Argentina	+0.121	Q
4	Luz Loayza	Peru	+0.194	
5	Paula Molina	Chile	+0.215	

Final for places 7-12

Rank	Name	Nation	Time Behind
1	Daniela Colilef	Chile	
2	Ruth Perdomo	Ecuador	+0.202
3	Luz Loayza	Peru	+0.292
4	Paula Molina	Chile	+0.452

Final for Gold

Rank	Name	Nation	Time Behind
1st place, gold medalist(s)	Stefany Cuadrado	Colombia	
2nd place, silver medalist(s)	Natalia Vera	Argentina	+0.122
3rd place, bronze medalist(s)	Juliana Gaviria	Colombia	+0.415
4	Carliany Martínez	Venezuela	+0.514
5	Valentina Méndez	Argentina	+0.655
6	Michell Manzi	Venezuela	+0.776

=== Women's madison ===
Rank	Name	Nation	Points	Notes
1st place, gold medalist(s)	Elizabeth Castaño; Lina Hernández	Colombia	35	
2nd place, silver medalist(s)	Scarlet Cortés; Aranza Villalón	Chile	25	
3rd place, bronze medalist(s)	Maribel Aguirre; Abril Garzon	Argentina	14	
4	Paola Silva; Luciana Wynants	Uruguay	13	
5	Verónica Abreu; María Daza	Venezuela	6	
6	Alice Leite; Carolina Barbosa	Brazil	-34	

=== Women's omnium ===
Rank	Name	Nation	Scratch	Tempo	Elimination	Points Race	Total
1st place, gold medalist(s)	Lina Hernández	Colombia	40	40	40	36	156
2nd place, silver medalist(s)	Verónica Abreu	Venezuela	38	34	34	22	128
3rd place, bronze medalist(s)	Julieta Benedetti	Argentina	34	36	30	19	127
4	Paola Silva	Uruguay	30	30	36	24	120
5	Scarlet Cortés	Chile	36	38	32	10	116
6	Alejandra Huamaní	Peru	28	28	30	-12	74
	Nicolle Wendy	Brazil	32	32	DNS		DNF

=== Women's team pursuit ===
Rank	Name	Nation	Qualifying			Final	
Rank	Name	Nation	Time	Rank	Notes	Time	Notes
1st place, gold medalist(s)	Lina Hernández; Luciana Osorio; Camila Valbuena; Elizabeth Castaño	Colombia	4:28.146	1	QG	4:23.037	
2nd place, silver medalist(s)	Scarlet Cortés; Javiera Garrido; Aranza Villalón; Maite Ibarra	Chile	4:29.570	2	QG	4:24.734	
3rd place, bronze medalist(s)	Verónica Abreu; María Daza; Fabiana Candelas; Shantal Zambrano	Venezuela	4:35.192	4	QB	4:29.993	
4	Julieta Benedetti; Abril Garzon; Jennifer Francone; Maribel Aguirre	Argentina	4:35.081	3	QB	4:30.686	

=== Women's team sprint ===
Rank	Name	Nation	Qualifying			Final	
Rank	Name	Nation	Time	Rank	Notes	Time	Notes
1st place, gold medalist(s)	Mariana Pajón; Juliana Gaviria; Stefany Cuadrado; Manuela Loaiza (F)	Colombia	49.088	1	QG	48.263	
2nd place, silver medalist(s)	Guadalupe Díaz; Natalia Vera; Valentina Méndez	Argentina	49.662	2	QG	49.468	
3rd place, bronze medalist(s)	Michell Manzi; Olviangel Castillo; Carliany Martínez	Venezuela	50.203	4	QB	49.254	
4	Paula Molina; Daniela Colilef; Paola Muñoz	Chile	50.102	3	QB	50.276	
