= Philip Schaub =

German BMX racer

Personal information
- Born: 24 July 1997 (age 29) Germany

Cycling career
- Sport: Cycling
- Discipline: BMX racing

Philip Schaub (born 24 July 1997) is a German BMX racer. He competed in the men's BMX racing event at the 2024 Summer Olympics.
