= Paola Reis =

Brazilian BMX rider (born 1999)

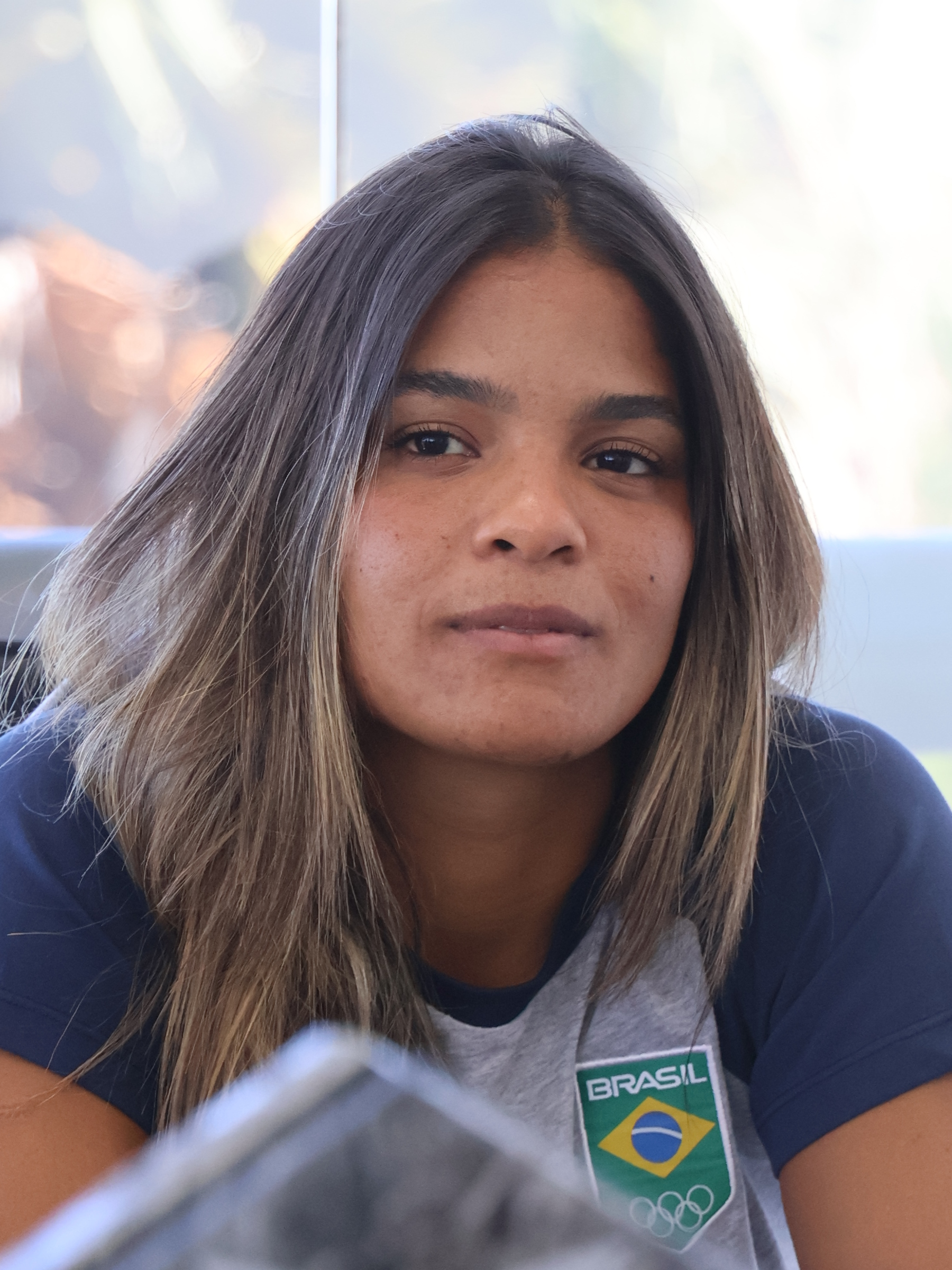

Personal information
- Born: 15 August 1999 (age 27)

Sport
- Country: Brazil
Medal record
Representing Brazil
Women's BMX racing
Event	1st	2nd	3rd
Pan American Games	0	1	0
Pan American Championships	2	1	0
South American Games	0	0	1
Pan American Junior Championships	2	0	0
Total	4	2	1
Pan American Games
Silver medal – second place	2019 Lima	BMX racing
Pan American Championships
Gold medal – first place	2023 Riobamba	BMX racing
Gold medal – first place	2025 Chillán	BMX racing
Silver medal – second place	2022 Santiago del Estero	BMX racing
South American Games
Bronze medal – third place	2026 Santa Fe	BMX racing
Pan American Junior Championships
Gold medal – first place	2016 Santiago del Estero	BMX racing
Gold medal – first place	2017 Santiago del Estero	BMX racing

Paola Reis (born 15 August 1999) is a Brazilian BMX rider.

Reis participated at the 2019 Pan American Games where she won a silver medal in the women's racing event.

In April 2021, Paola Reis became involved in a controversy with the Brazilian Cycling Confederation (CBC). She had failed to comply with the mandatory 14-day quarantine determined by the Brazilian Olympic Committee for Brazilians who embarked for the final training period before the World Cup stages that defined the Olympic quotas.
