= Manon Veenstra =

Dutch cyclist (born 1998)

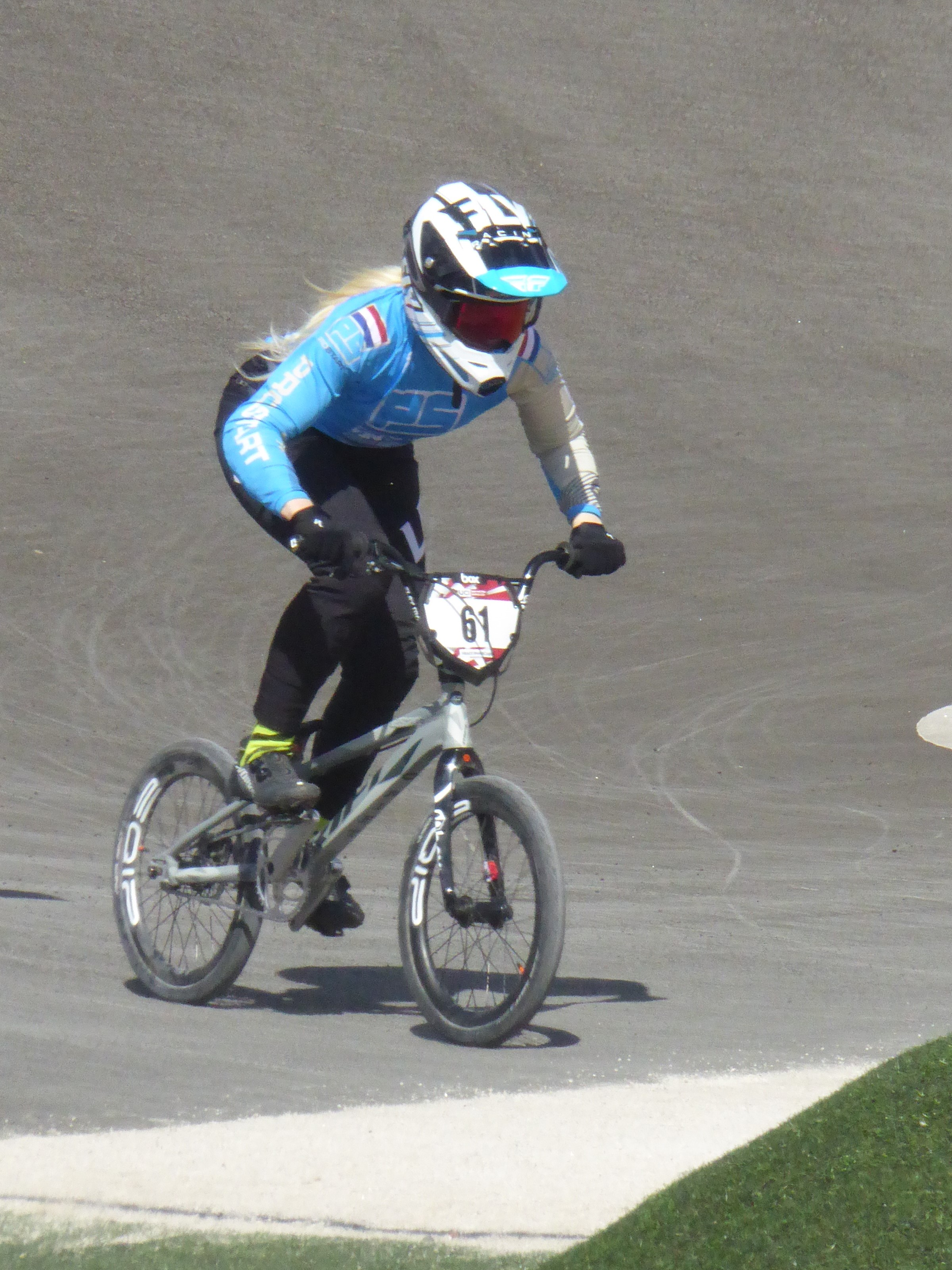
- Veenstra in 2022

Personal information
- Born: 6 July 1998 (age 28) Zwolle, Netherlands

Cycling career
- Sport: Cycling
- Discipline: BMX racing
Medal record
Women's BMX racing
Representing Netherlands
Event	1st	2nd	3rd
Olympic Games	0	1	0
World Cup	0	1	0
World Cup rounds	0	1	2
European Championships	0	0	1
Total	0	3	3
Olympic Games
Silver medal – second place	2024 Paris	BMX racing
World Cup
Silver medal – second place	2024	BMX racing
European Championships
Bronze medal – third place	2023 Besançon	BMX time trial (team)

Manon Veenstra (born 6 July 1998) is a Dutch BMX racer. She finished second at the 2024 UCI BMX Racing World Cup and won silver at the 2024 Summer Olympics.

== Early and personal life ==
She was born in Zwolle but grew up in Kerkenveld. She has trained in Papendal as well as New Zealand, and was stuck in New Zealand at the outset of the COVID-19 pandemic in 2020, unable to return. She has worked in health care with people with dementia and studied psychology via the Open University.

== Career ==
She competed for the Netherlands at the 2023 UCI Cycling World Championships in Glasgow, Scotland in August 2023.

Competing in the 2024 UCI BMX Racing World Cup in 2024, she won medals in Tulsa, United States, Brisbane, Australia and Rotorua, New Zealand in 2024.

She placed second overall in the 2024 World Cup standings and was selected for the 2024 Summer Olympics. Veenstra won the silver medal at the Olympic Games in Paris.
