= Anderson Ezequiel de Souza Filho =

Brazilian BMX rider

Personal information
- Born: 3 March 1996 (age 30) Varginha, Minas Gerais

Cycling career
- Sport: Cycling
- Current team: Brazil
- Discipline: BMX racing
- Role: Rider
Medal record
World Championships
Bronze medal – third place	2018 Baku	BMX racing
Pan American Games
Silver medal – second place	2019 Lima	BMX racing

Anderson Ezequiel De Souza Filho (born 3 March 1996) is a Brazilian male BMX rider, representing his nation at international competitions. He became the first rider of his country to win a World Championship medal with a bronze at the 2018 UCI BMX World Championships.
