= Ruben Gommers =

Belgian BMX racer

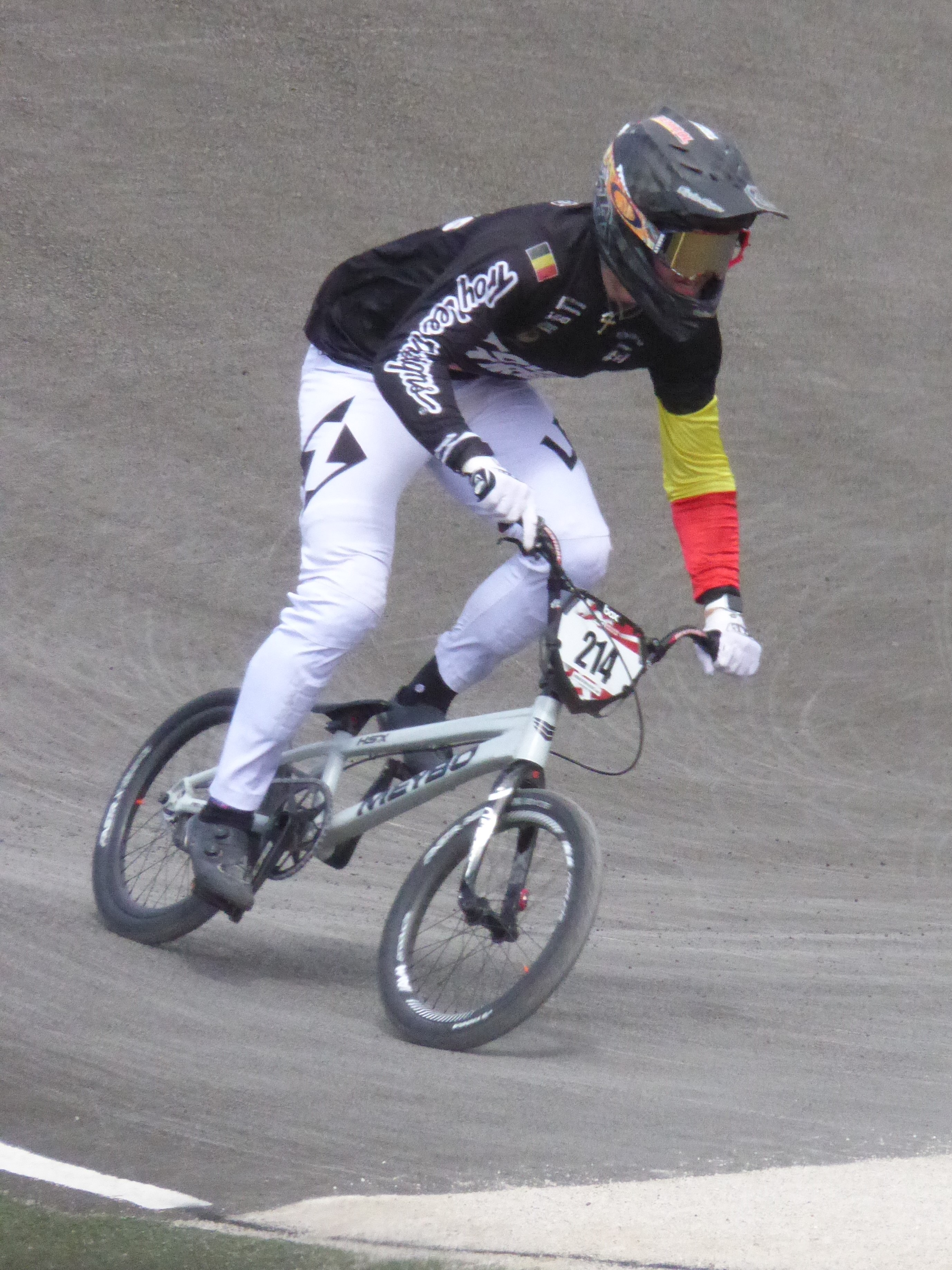
- Gommers in 2022

Personal information
- Born: 29 September 1998 (age 28) Wuustwezel, Belgium

Cycling career
- Sport: Cycling
- Discipline: BMX racing

Ruben Gommers (born 29 September 1998) is a Belgian BMX racer. He competed in the men's BMX racing event at the 2024 Summer Olympics.
