= James Palmer (cyclist) =

Canadian BMX cyclist

Personal information
- Born: November 3, 1994 (age 30); North Vancouver, British Columbia, Canada
- Height: 180 cm (5 ft 11 in)
- Weight: 81 kg (179 lb)

Sport
- Country: Canada
- Sport: Cycling
- Event: BMX

James Palmer (born November 3, 1994) is a Canadian cyclist in the BMX discipline.

== Career ==
Palmer has competed at five World Championships in 2014, 2015, 2016, 2017, 2018 and 2019, finishing 83rd, 36th, 20th, 16th, 27th, and 37th respectively. In 2019, Palmer competed at the 2019 Pan American Games, finishing in fifth place.

In July 2021, Palmer was named to Canada's 2020 Olympic team.
