= Mateo Carmona =

Colombian BMX rider (born 2001)

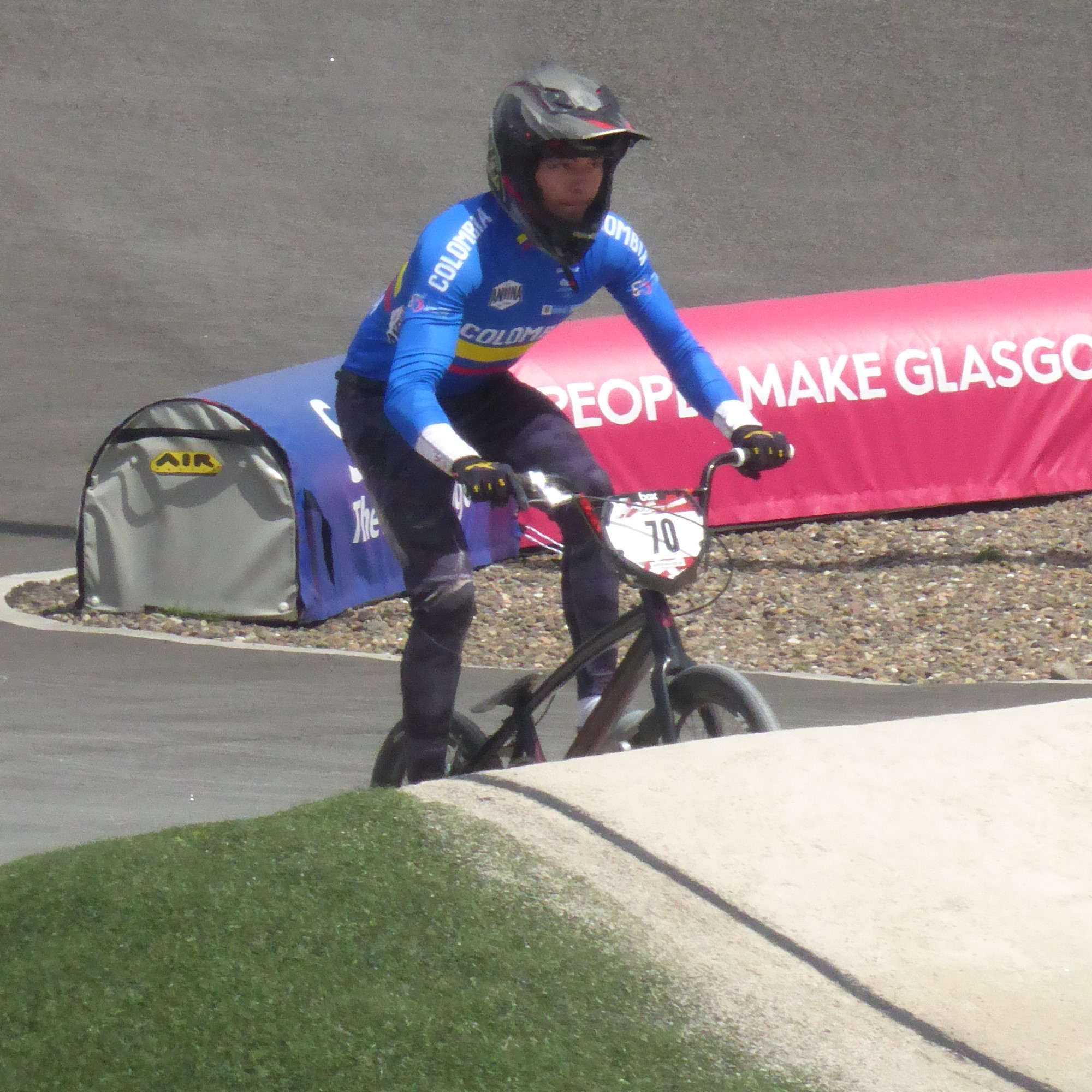
- Carmona in 2022

Personal information
- Full name: Mateo Carmona Garcia
- Born: 23 December 2001 (age 24)

Cycling career
- Sport: Cycling
- Discipline: BMX racing
Medal record
Representing Colombia
Men's BMX racing
Event	1st	2nd	3rd
World Cup rounds	0	0	1
Pan American Championships	0	0	1
South American Games	1	0	0
Junior Pan American Games	1	0	0
Pan American Junior Championships	1	0	0
Total	3	0	2
Pan American Championships
Bronze medal – third place	2026 Bogotá	BMX racing
South American Games
Gold medal – first place	2026 Santa Fe	BMX racing
Junior Pan American Games
Gold medal – first place	2021 Cali-Valle	BMX racing
Pan American Junior Championships
Gold medal – first place	2019 Americana	BMX racing

Mateo Carmona Garcia (born 23 December 2001) is a Colombian BMX racer. He competed at the 2024 Summer Olympics.

== Career ==
In 2021, he won the gold medal at the Junior Pan American Games, held in Cali, Colombia.

He was selected to represent Colombia at the 2024 Summer Olympics in Paris. Racing at the Games, he made it through the preliminary round on 1 August 2024, to race in the semi finals.

== Personal life ==
He is from the Antioquia Department of Colombia.
