= Kamren Larsen =

American professional BMX racer

Personal information
- Full name: Kamren Larsen
- Born: October 28, 1999 (age 26) Bakersfield, California, U.S.

Cycling career
- Sport: Cycling
- Current team: Answer/Jungle U/US
- Discipline: BMX racing
- Role: Rider
- Rider type: Elite Men
Medal record
Representing United States
Men's BMX racing
Event	1st	2nd	3rd
Pan American Games	1	0	0
Pan American Championships	1	0	0
USA Elite Men National Championship	1	1	0
Total	3	1	0
Pan American Games
Gold medal – first place	2023 Santiago	BMX racing
Pan American Championships
Gold medal – first place	2023 Riobamba	BMX racing
USA Elite Men National Championship
Gold medal – first place	2024 Rock Hill	BMX racing
Silver medal – second place	2021 Rock Hill	BMX racing

Kamren Larsen (/ˈkæmrən/ KAM-rən; born October 28, 1999) is an American racing cyclist who competes in BMX.

== Pro career ==
He finished 1st at the 2023 American Continental Championships in Riobamba Ecuador, nabbing his first career international win.

Larsen won Gold at the Cycling at the 2023 Pan American Games – Men's BMX racing on October 22, 2023 in Santiago, Chile. Larsen ran a 31.810 in the Men's final to hold off fellow American Cameron Wood and Columbian Carlos Ramírez. Larsen earns the US's 3rd Men's Elite BMX Gold Medal in the Pan American Games joining Jason Richardson (2007) & Connor Fields (2011).

== Olympics ==
On June 18, 2024, Larsen announced on the Today Show that he has been selected to represent the United States at the 2024 Olympic Games in Paris France.
