= Aleksandr Katyshev =

Russian BMX rider (born 1996)

Personal information
- Born: 2 January 1996 (age 30) Elista, Kalmykia, Soviet Union

Cycling career
- Sport: Cycling
- Current team: Russia
- Discipline: BMX racing
- Role: Rider

Aleksandr Katyshev (born 2 January 1996) is a Russian male BMX rider, representing his nation at international competitions. He competed in the time trial event at the 2015 UCI BMX World Championships.
