= Pietro Bertagnoli =

Italian BMX racer

Personal information
- Born: 22 August 1999 (age 27)

Cycling career
- Sport: Cycling
- Discipline: BMX racing

Pietro Bertagnoli (born 22 August 1999) is an Italian BMX racer. He competed in the men's BMX racing event at the 2024 Summer Olympics.
