= Natalia Afremova =

Russian cyclist

Personal information
- Full name: Natalia Mikhailovna Afremova
- Born: 14 November 1998 (age 27) Penza, Russia

Cycling career
- Sport: Cycling
- Discipline: BMX racing
- Role: Rider
Medal record
Representing Russia
Women's BMX racing
Event	1st	2nd	3rd
World Junior Championships	0	1	1
World Cup rounds	0	5	5
Total	0	6	6
World Junior Championships
Silver medal – second place	2016 Medellín	BMX racing
Bronze medal – third place	2015 Heusden-Zolder	BMX time trial

Natalia Mikhailovna Afremova (Russian: Наталья Михайловна Афремова; born 14 November 1998) is a Russian BMX racing cyclist.

She came fifth in the European championships in July 2021. She was selected in the Russian Olympic Committee team for the Cycling at the 2020 Summer Olympics – Women's BMX racing.
