= Jefferson Milano =

Venezuelan BMX rider (born 1995)

Personal information
- Full name: Jefferson Jordan Milano Durán
- Born: 21 November 1995 (age 30) Caracas, Venezuela
- Height: 1.85 m (6 ft 1 in)
- Weight: 85 kg (187 lb)

Sport
- Country: Venezuela
- Sport: Cycling
- Event: BMX racing
Medal record
Representing Venezuela
Men's BMX racing
Pan American Championships
Silver medal – second place	2018 Medellín	BMX racing
Central American and Caribbean Games
Gold medal – first place	2018 Barranquilla	BMX racing
Pan American Junior Championships
Bronze medal – third place	2012 Santa Cruz de la Sierra	BMX racing

Jefferson Jordan Milano Durán (Note: In this Spanish name, the first or paternal surname is Milano and the second or maternal family name is Durán.) (born 21 November 1995) is a Venezuelan cyclist. He represented Venezuela at the 2016 Summer Olympics in the Men's BMX event.

Milano won a gold medal at the 2018 Central American and Caribbean Games in the Men's BMX event. He represented Venezuela at the 2019 Pan American Games in the Men's BMX racing event.
