= Federico Villegas (BMX rider) =

Argentine cyclist

Personal information
- Born: 13 July 1994 (age 32)

Cycling career
- Sport: Cycling
- Current team: Argentina
- Discipline: BMX racing
- Role: Rider
Medal record
Pan American Games
Bronze medal – third place	2019 Lima	Men's BMX racing
South American Games
Silver medal – second place	2014 Santiago	Men's BMX

Federico Villegas (born 13 July 1994) is an Argentine male BMX rider, representing his nation at international competitions. He competed in the time trial event at the 2015 UCI BMX World Championships.
