= Cycling at the 2020 Summer Olympics – Qualification =

For the cycling competitions at the 2020 Summer Olympics (postponed to 2021 due to the COVID-19 pandemic), the following qualification systems are in place.

== Qualification summary ==
Nation	Road				Track												MTB		BMX				Total	
Nation	Men		Women		Men						Women						M	W	Men		Women		Q	R
Nation	RR	TT	RR	TT	TS	KE	SP	TP	OM	MD	TS	KE	SP	TP	OM	MD	M	W	RC	FR	RC	FR	Q	R
Algeria	2	1																					3	2
Argentina	1																	1	1				3	3
Australia	4	2	4	2	X	2	2	X	X	X		1	1	X	X	X	1	1	1	1	2	1	35	29
Austria	3	1	1						X	X							1	1					9	8
Azerbaijan	1																						1	1
Belarus	1		1	1					X						X								5	4
Belgium	5	2	3	1					X	X					X	X	1	1			1		18	15
Brazil																	2	1	1		1		5	5
Burkina Faso	1																						1	1
Canada	3	1	3	2		2	2	X		X		2	2	X	X		1	2	1		1		26	24
Chile			1														1					1	3	3
China	1		1			1	1				X	2	2				1	1					11	7
Colombia	5	1	1			1	1												2		1		12	10
Costa Rica	1		1																	1			3	3
Croatia	1																						1	1
Cuba			1																				1	1
Cyprus			1																				1	1
Czech Republic	3	1	1			1	1										1	1					9	7
Denmark	4	1	2	1				X	X	X					X	X	1	2			1		17	17
Ecuador	2	1																	1		1		5	4
Egypt															X								1	1
Eritrea	2	1	1																				4	3
Estonia	2	1																1					4	3
Ethiopia			1																				1	1
France	5	1	1	1	X	2	2		X	X		2	2	X	X	X	2	2	3	1	2		32	28
Germany	4	2	4	2	X	2	2	X	X	X	X	2	2	X		X	2	2			1	1	33	28
Great Britain	4	2	2	1	X	2	2	X	X	X		1	1	X	X	X	1	1	1	1	1	1	28	26
Greece	1								X								1						3	3
Guatemala	1																						1	1
Hong Kong	1											2	2		X	X							7	5
Hungary	1																1	1					3	3
Iran	1	1																					2	1
Ireland	3	1							X	X					X	X							8	7
Israel			1	1													1						3	2
Italy	5	2	4	1				X	X	X				X	X	X	3	1	1				23	24
Japan	2		2	1		2	2		X			1	1		X	X	1	1	1	1	1	1	20	16
Kazakhstan	3	1				1	1		X														7	5
Latvia	2	1																	1		1		5	4
Lithuania	1		1								X	2	2		X								8	5
Luxembourg	2		1	1																			4	3
Malaysia						2	2																4	2
Mexico	1		1	1							X	2	2		X		1	1					11	7
Morocco	1																						1	1
Namibia	1		1														1	1					4	4
Netherlands	5	1	4	2	X	2	2		X	X	X	2	2		X	X	2	2	3		3		36	28
New Zealand	2	2			X	2	2	X	X	X		2	2	X	X	X	1				1		21	19
Norway	4	1	2	1											X		1		1				11	9
Panama	1																						1	1
Paraguay			1																				1	1
Peru	1																						1	1
Poland	3	1	3	1	X	2	2		X	X	X	2	2		X	X	1	1					24	17
Portugal	2	2													X			1					6	4
Refugee Olympic Team		1		1																			2	2
Romania	1																1						2	2
ROC	3	1	1		X	2	2				X	2	2		X	X	1	1	1	1	2	1	24	18
Rwanda	1																						1	1
Slovakia	2	1																					3	2
Slovenia	4	1	1															1					7	6
South Africa	3	1	2	1		1	1		X			1	1				1	1	1				15	11
South Korea			1									1	1										3	2
Spain	5	1	2	1					X	X							2	1					14	12
Suriname						1	1																2	1
Sweden																		1					1	1
Switzerland	4	2	1	1				X	X	X							3	3	2		1	1	21	20
Chinese Taipei	1																						1	1
Thailand			1																				1	1
Trinidad and Tobago			1			2	2																5	3
Turkey	2																						2	2
Ukraine	1		1								X	2	2					1					8	5
United States	2	2	4	2					X	X		1	1	X	X	X	1	3	2	2	3	2	30	27
Uzbekistan	1		1																				2	2
Venezuela	1																			1			2	2
Total: 72 NOCs	130	41	67	26	8	30	30	8	20	16	8	30	30	8	21	16	38	38	24	9	24	9	631	530

Legend

- TS – Team sprint
- KE – Keirin
- SP – Sprint
- TP – Team pursuit
- OM – Omnium
- MD – Madison
- RR – Road race
- TT – Individual time trial
- RC – Race
- FR – Freestyle
- Q – Quotas
- R – Riders

=== Track cycling ===
Track cycling is done entirely through UCI nation rankings. The quotas per event are as follows:

- Team sprint – top 8 teams per gender
- Team pursuit – top 8 teams per gender
- Madison – all NOCs with a qualified team pursuit, in addition to the next 8 teams per gender (total of 16 teams)
- Omnium – NOCs directly qualifying for Madison, in addition to the next 12 (men) or 13 (women) (21 individuals)
- Sprint – NOCs qualifying in team sprint enter 2 individuals, in addition to the next 7 best-ranked in individual sprint, and the next 7 best-ranked in Keirin (total of 30 individuals)
- Keirin – NOCs qualifying in team sprint enter 2 individuals, in addition to the next 7 best-ranked in individual sprint, and the next 7 best-ranked in Keirin (total of 30 individuals)

=== Road cycling ===
Majority of the places in road cycling are attributed through the UCI nation rankings (122 for men, 62 for women), with special provisions for highly-ranked individuals whose nations do not make it. A small number of additional places are available through individual road race continental championships (2 men and 1 woman each for Africa, Americas, and Asia). Host nation Japan has obtained 2 guaranteed spots per gender in the road race. For the road time trial, the NOC must have qualified for the road race. The top 30 (men) or 15 (women) NOCs in the nation rankings may enter a time trial cyclist. The 2019 World Championships also afford 10 places per gender in the time trial. NOCs can have a maximum of 2 time trial entries if they qualify through each of those two methods.

=== Mountain biking ===
For mountain biking, 38 spots per gender are allocated. Thirty places will be allocated through the UCI nation rankings and three through continental championships with one each for Africa, Americas, and Asia. One spot per gender has been reserved for host nation Japan. The remaining four spots will be awarded to the top mountain bikers competing at the 2019 UCI World Championships, with two each in the elite and under-23, respectively.

=== BMX ===
In the BMX race, twenty-four spots are available for each gender, with one reserved for host nation Japan. Eighteen places will be awarded to the highest-ranked NOCs through the UCI qualification rankings, three through the UCI individual rankings, and the remaining two through the 2020 UCI World Championships. In the BMX freestyle events, nine spots are available for each gender, with one reserved for host nation Japan, six for the highest-ranked NOCs through the UCI rankings, and the remaining two for those competing at the 2019 UCI Urban Cycling World Championships.

== Timeline ==
The following is a timeline of the qualification events for the cycling events at the 2020 Summer Olympics.

Event	Date	Venue
Road
2019 African Continental Championships	March 15–20, 2019	Ethiopia
2019 Asian Continental Championships	April 27–28, 2019	(Uzbekistan) Tashkent
2019 Pan American Continental Championships	May 2–5, 2019	Mexico
2019 UCI Road World Championships	September 22–29, 2019	(United Kingdom) Harrogate
Establishment of the UCI World Rankings by Nations	October 22, 2019	—N/a
Track
Establishment of the UCI Olympic Track Ranking 2018–2020 (at end of 2020 UCI Track Cycling World Championships)	March 2, 2020	—N/a
Mountain biking
2019 Pan American Continental Championships	April 3–7, 2019	(Mexico) Aguascalientes
2019 African Continental Championships	April 12–14, 2019	(Namibia) Windhoek
2019 Asian Continental Championships	July 25–28, 2019	(Lebanon) Kfardebian
2019 UCI Mountain Bike World Championships	August 28 – September 1, 2019	(Canada) Mont-Sainte-Anne
Establishment of the UCI Olympic qualification ranking	May 18, 2021	—N/a
BMX
2019 UCI Urban Cycling World Championships	November 6–10, 2019	(China) Chengdu
UCI Individual Rankings (BMX race)	June 1, 2021	—N/a
Establishment of the UCI Rankings by Nation (BMX race)	June 1, 2021	—N/a
Establishment of the UCI Rankings by Nation (BMX freestyle)	June 8, 2021	—N/a

== Road cycling ==
=== Men's road race ===
Event	Ranking by nation	Qualified	Athletes per NOC
Host nation	—N/a	Japan	1
UCI World Ranking	1 to 6	Belgium; Italy; Netherlands; France; Colombia; Spain	5
UCI World Ranking	7 to 13	Slovenia; Germany; Australia; Denmark; Great Britain; Norway; Switzerland	4
UCI World Ranking	14 to 21	Austria; Poland; Ireland; ROC; South Africa; Kazakhstan; Canada; Czech Republic	3
UCI World Ranking	22 to 32	Ecuador; Portugal; Slovakia; Eritrea; United States; New Zealand; Estonia; Algeria; Luxembourg; Latvia; Turkey	2
UCI World Ranking	33 to 50	Belarus; Ukraine; Costa Rica; Greece; Romania; Iran; ~~Sweden~~; Hungary; Venezuela; Japan; Morocco; Azerbaijan; Lithuania; Rwanda; Mexico; Guatemala; Argentina; China	1
2019 African Championships	1 to 2	Namibia; Burkina Faso	1
2019 Asian Championships	1 to 2	Chinese Taipei; Uzbekistan	1
2019 Pan American Championships	1 to 2	Peru; Panama	1
Reallocation of unused quota	—N/a	Hong Kong; Croatia	1
Total			130

* Quota reduced by one to accommodate for the individual qualifiers

=== Men's individual time trial ===
Event	Ranking by nation	Qualified	Athletes per NOC
UCI World Ranking	1 to 30	Belgium; Italy; Netherlands; France; Colombia; Spain; Slovenia; Germany; Australia; Denmark; Great Britain; Norway; Switzerland; Austria; Poland; Ireland; ROC; South Africa; Kazakhstan; Canada; Czech Republic; Ecuador; Portugal; Slovakia; Eritrea; United States; New Zealand; ~~Estonia~~; Algeria; Iran**	1
2019 UCI Road World Championships	1 to 10	Australia; Belgium; Italy; New Zealand; Great Britain; United States; Estonia; Portugal; Germany; Switzerland	1
Invitational place	1	Ahmad Wais (EOR)	1
Reallocation of unused quota	—N/a	Latvia	1
Total			41

** Qualified as a continental representative

=== Women's road race ===
Event	Ranking by nation	Qualified	Athletes per NOC
Host nation	—N/a	Japan	1
UCI World Ranking	1 to 5	Netherlands; Italy; Germany; United States; Australia	4
UCI World Ranking	6 to 13	Belgium	3
UCI World Ranking	6 to 13	Denmark; Canada; Poland; Spain; Great Britain; Norway; South Africa	2*
UCI World Ranking	14 to 22	Luxembourg; France; Cuba; Mexico; Switzerland; Slovenia; Belarus; Japan; ROC	1*
UCI World Ranking	Individual top 100	Uzbekistan; Thailand; Trinidad and Tobago; Israel; ~~Finland~~; Cyprus; China; Austria; ~~Sweden~~; Colombia; Ukraine; Chile; Costa Rica; Czech Republic; Lithuania; Namibia; Eritrea	1
2019 African Championships	1	Ethiopia	1
2019 Asian Championships	1	South Korea	1
2019 Pan American Championships	1	Paraguay	1
Reallocation of unused quota	—N/a	Canada; Poland	1
Total			67

* Quota reduced by one to accommodate for the individual qualifiers

=== Women's individual time trial ===
Event	Ranking by nation	Qualified	Athletes per NOC
UCI World Ranking	1 to 15	Netherlands; Italy; Germany; United States; Australia; Belgium; Denmark; Canada; Poland; Spain; Great Britain; Norway; South Africa; Luxembourg; Japan**	1
2019 UCI Road World Championships	1 to 10	United States; Netherlands; Germany; Switzerland; Belarus; Australia; Canada; Israel; ~~Sweden~~; France	1
Invitational place	1	Masomah Ali Zada (EOR)	1
Reallocation of unused quota	—N/a	Mexico	1
Total			26

** Qualified as a continental representative

== Track cycling ==
Track cycling quotas were released by the UCI in March 2020.

=== Men's team sprint ===
Event	Ranking by Nation	Qualified NOC	Teams per NOC
2018–2020 Olympic track ranking	1 to 8	Australia; France; Germany; Great Britain; Netherlands; New Zealand; Poland; ROC	1
Total			8

=== Men's sprint ===
Event	Ranking by Nation	Qualified NOC	Athletes per NOC
NOCs qualified for team sprint	—	Australia; France; Germany; Great Britain; Netherlands; New Zealand; Poland; ROC	up to 2
2018–2020 Olympic track ranking	1 to 7	Canada; China; Japan; Malaysia; South Africa*; Suriname; Trinidad and Tobago	1
NOCs qualified for Keirin	—	Canada; Colombia; Czech Republic; Japan; Kazakhstan; Malaysia; Trinidad and Tobago	1
Total			30

* Qualified as a continental representative

=== Men's Keirin ===
Event	Ranking by Nation	Qualified NOC	Athletes per NOC
NOCs qualified for team sprint	—	Australia; France; Germany; Great Britain; Netherlands; New Zealand; Poland; ROC	up to 2
2018–2020 Olympic track ranking	1 to 7	Canada; Colombia; Czech Republic; Japan; Kazakhstan; Malaysia; Trinidad and Tobago	1
NOCs qualified for sprint	—	Canada; China; Japan; Malaysia; South Africa; Suriname; Trinidad and Tobago	1
Total			30

=== Men's team pursuit ===
Event	Ranking by Nation	Qualified NOC	Teams per NOC
2018–2020 Olympic track ranking	1 to 8	Australia; Canada; Denmark; Germany; Great Britain; Italy; New Zealand; Switzerland	1
Total			8

=== Men's Madison ===
Event	Ranking by Nation	Qualified NOC	Athletes per NOC
NOCs qualified for team pursuit	—	Australia; Canada; Denmark; Germany; Great Britain; Italy; New Zealand; Switzerland	1
2018–2020 Olympic track ranking	1 to 8	Austria; Belgium; Spain; France; Ireland; Poland; Netherlands; United States	1
Total			16

=== Men's Omnium ===
Event	Ranking by Nation	Qualified NOC	Athletes per NOC
NOCs directly qualified for Madison	—	Austria; Belgium; Spain; France; Ireland; Poland; Netherlands; United States	1
2018–2020 Olympic track ranking	1 to 12	Australia; Belarus; Denmark; Germany; Great Britain; Greece; Italy; Japan; Kazakhstan; New Zealand; South Africa*; Switzerland	1
Total			20

* Qualified as a continental representative

=== Women's team sprint ===
Event	Ranking by Nation	Qualified NOC	Teams per NOC
2018–2020 Olympic track ranking	1 to 8	~~Australia~~; China; Germany; Lithuania; Mexico; Netherlands; Poland; ROC	1
Reallocation of unused quota	—N/a	Ukraine	1
Total			8

=== Women's sprint ===
Event	Ranking by Nation	Qualified NOC	Athletes per NOC
NOCs qualified for team sprint	—	China; Germany; Lithuania; Mexico; Netherlands; Poland; ROC; Ukraine	up to 2
2018–2020 Olympic track ranking	1 to 7	Australia; Canada; France; Great Britain; Hong Kong; New Zealand; South Africa*	1
NOCs qualified for Keirin	—	Canada; France; Hong Kong; Japan; New Zealand; South Korea; United States	1
Total			30

* Qualified as a continental representative

=== Women's Keirin ===
Event	Ranking by Nation	Qualified NOC	Athletes per NOC
NOCs qualified for team sprint	—	China; Germany; Lithuania; Mexico; Netherlands; Poland; ROC; Ukraine	up to 2
2018–2020 Olympic track ranking	1 to 7	Canada; France; Hong Kong; Japan; New Zealand; South Korea; United States	1
NOCs qualified for sprint	—	Australia; Canada; France; Great Britain; Hong Kong; New Zealand; South Africa	1
Total			30

=== Women's team pursuit ===
Event	Ranking by Nation	Qualified NOC	Teams per NOC
2018–2020 Olympic track ranking	1 to 8	Australia; Canada; France; Germany; Great Britain; Italy; New Zealand; United States	1
Total			8

=== Women's Madison ===
Event	Ranking by Nation	Qualified NOC	Athletes per NOC
NOCs qualified for team pursuit	—	Australia; ~~Canada~~; France; Germany; Great Britain; Italy; New Zealand; United States	1
2018–2020 Olympic track ranking	1 to 8	Belgium; Denmark; Hong Kong; Ireland; Japan; Netherlands; Poland; ROC	1
Total			15

Cycling Canada declined to enter a team in the women's madison due to a lack of competitive experience in the event, and the event being prior to the omnium in the Olympic program.

=== Women's Omnium ===
Event	Ranking by Nation	Qualified NOC	Athletes per NOC
NOCs qualified for Madison	—	Belgium; Denmark; Hong Kong; Ireland; Japan; Netherlands; Poland; ROC	1
2018–2020 Olympic track ranking	1 to 13	Australia; Belarus; Canada; China; Egypt*; France; Great Britain; Italy; ~~Mexico~~; New Zealand; Norway; Portugal; United States	1
Rellocation	14	Lithuania	1
Total			21

* Qualified as a continental representative

== Mountain biking ==
Quotas were released in May 2021.

=== Men's cross-country race ===
Event	Ranking by nation	Qualified	Athletes per NOC
Host nation	—N/a	Japan	1
2020 UCI Olympic qualification ranking	1 to 2	Switzerland; Italy	3
2020 UCI Olympic qualification ranking	3 to 7	France; Brazil; Netherlands; Spain; Germany	2
2020 UCI Olympic qualification ranking	8 to 21	Czech Republic; Austria; Canada; Denmark; United States; Belgium; ROC; South Africa; New Zealand; Poland; Norway; Greece; Hungary; Romania	1
2019 African Championships	1	Namibia	1
2019 Pan American Championships	1	Mexico	1
2019 Asian Championships	1	China	1
2019 UCI Mountain Bike World Championships (elite)	1 to 2	Australia; Israel	1
2019 UCI Mountain Bike World Championships (under-23)	1 to 2	Chile; Great Britain	1
Total			38

=== Women's cross-country race ===
Event	Ranking by nation	Qualified	Athletes per NOC
Host nation	—N/a	Japan	1
2020 UCI Olympic qualification ranking	1 to 2	Switzerland; United States	3
2020 UCI Olympic qualification ranking	3 to 7	Netherlands; Canada; France; Denmark; Germany	2
2020 UCI Olympic qualification ranking	8 to 21	Great Britain; Italy; South Africa; Poland; Ukraine; Czech Republic; Belgium; Austria; Argentina; Estonia; Brazil; Hungary; Spain; Australia	1
2019 African Championships	1	Namibia	1
2019 Pan American Championships	1	Mexico	1
2019 Asian Championships	1	China	1
2019 UCI Mountain Bike World Championships (elite)	1 to 2	Slovenia; Sweden	1
2019 UCI Mountain Bike World Championships (under-23)	1 to 2	Portugal; ROC	1
Total			38

== BMX ==
Racing quotas were released on June 4, 2021.

=== Men's BMX race ===
Event	Ranking by nation	Qualified	Athletes per NOC
Host nation	—N/a	Japan	1
UCI Olympic qualification ranking	1 to 2	France; Netherlands	3
UCI Olympic qualification ranking	3 to 5	United States; Switzerland; Colombia	2
UCI Olympic qualification ranking	6 to 11	Australia; Great Britain; Argentina; Brazil; Ecuador; South Africa**	1
UCI BMX individual ranking	1 to 3	Norway; Canada; ROC	1
World Championship Re-Allocation	1 to 2	Italy; Latvia	1
Total			24

** Qualified as a continental representative

=== Women's BMX race ===
Event	Ranking by nation	Qualified	Athletes per NOC
Host nation	—N/a	Japan	1
UCI Olympic qualification ranking	1 to 2	Netherlands; United States	3
UCI Olympic qualification ranking	3 to 5	France; ROC; Australia	2
UCI Olympic qualification ranking	6 to 11	Colombia; Brazil; New Zealand; Denmark; Switzerland; Canada	1
UCI BMX individual ranking	1 to 3	Great Britain; Ecuador; Latvia	1
World Championship Re-Allocation	1 to 2	Belgium; Thailand	1
Total			24

** Qualified as a continental representative

=== Men's BMX freestyle ===
Event	Ranking by nation	Qualified	Athletes per NOC
Host nation	—N/a	Japan	1
UCI Olympic qualification ranking	1	United States	2
UCI Olympic qualification ranking	2 to 5	Australia; ROC; Great Britain; France	1
2019 UCI Urban Cycling World Championships	1 to 2	Venezuela; Costa Rica	1
Total			9

=== Women's BMX freestyle ===
Event	Ranking by nation	Qualified	Athletes per NOC
Host nation	—N/a	Japan	1
UCI Olympic qualification ranking	1	United States	2
UCI Olympic qualification ranking	2 to 5	Germany; Great Britain; Switzerland; ROC	1
2019 UCI Urban Cycling World Championship	1 to 2	Chile; Australia	1
Total			9
