= Simon Marquart =

Swiss BMX cyclist (born 1996)

Personal information
- Full name: Simon M. Marquart
- Born: 1 November 1996 (age 29) Zürich, Switzerland
- Height: 1.79 m (5 ft 10 in)

Cycling career
- Sport: Cycling
- Discipline: BMX racing
Medal record
Men's BMX racing
Representing Switzerland
World Championships
| Gold medal – first place | 2022 Nantes | BMX racing |
World Cup
| Gold medal – first place | 2021 | BMX racing |

Simon M. Marquart (born 1 November 1996) is a Swiss BMX cyclist.

In 2021 he became the first Swiss BMX racer to win a World Cup event when he won his maiden title at the season opener in Verona, Italy. He was selected in the Swiss team for the Cycling at the 2020 Summer Olympics – Men's BMX racing.

At the 2022 UCI BMX World Championships he finished 1st in the elite men's event.
