= Mauricio Molina (BMX rider) =

Chilean BMX racer (born 2001)

Personal information
- Full name: Mauricio Ignacio Molina Vergara
- Born: 23 August 2001 (age 25) Chile

Cycling career
- Sport: Cycling
- Discipline: BMX racing
Medal record
Men's BMX racing
Representing Chile
World Junior Championships
Bronze medal – third place	2018 Baku	BMX racing
Bolivarian Games
Silver medal – second place	2025 Lima-Ayacucho	BMX racing

Mauricio Molina Vergara (born 23 August 2001) is a Chilean BMX racer. He competed in the men's BMX racing event at the 2024 Summer Olympics.
