= Carlos Ramírez (BMX rider) =

Colombian cyclist (born 1994)

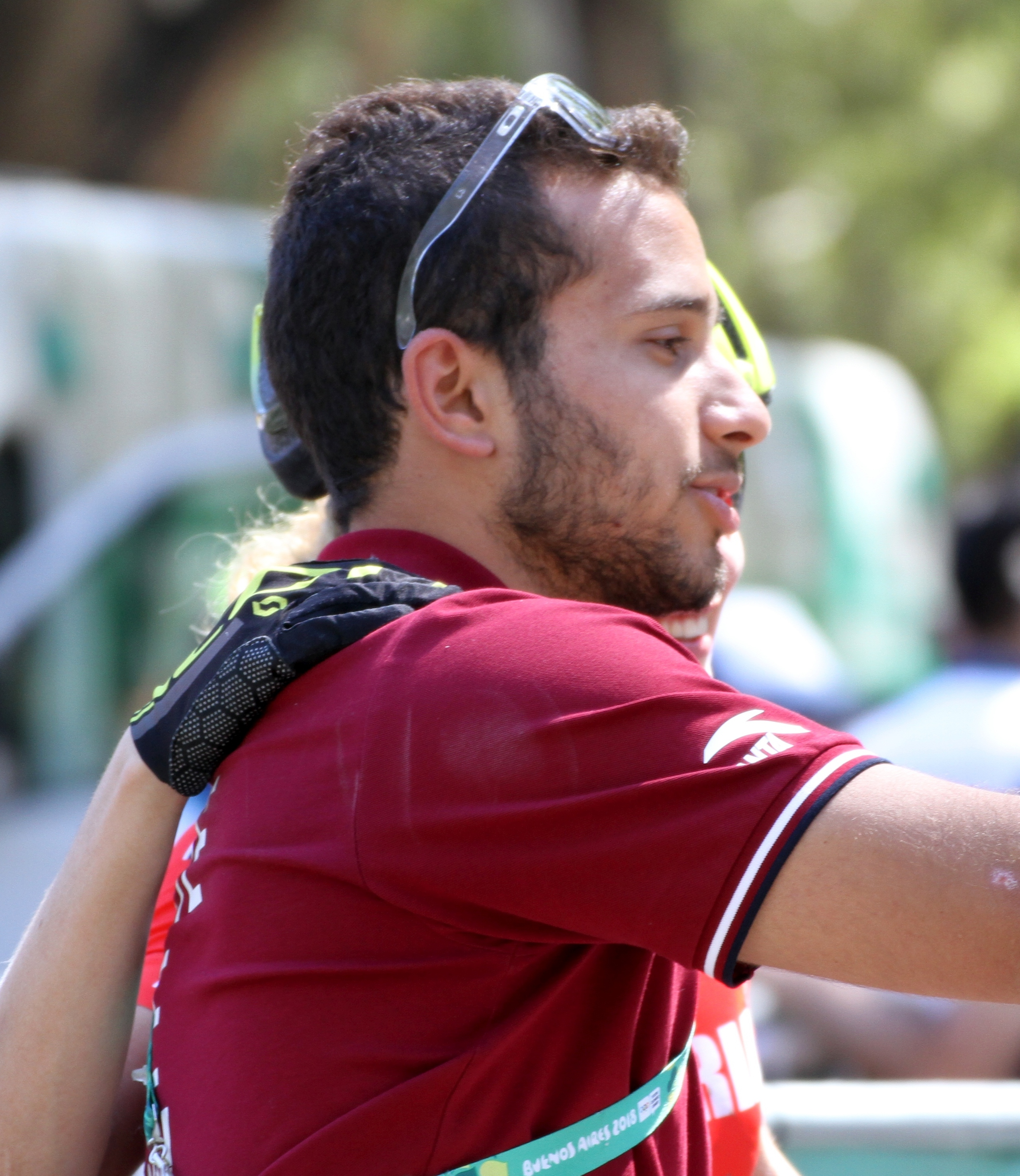
- Ramírez at the 2018 Youth Olympics

Personal information
- Full name: Carlos Alberto Ramírez Yepes
- Nickname: "The Little Magician"
- Born: 12 March 1994 (age 32) Medellín, Colombia
- Height: 1.78 m (5 ft 10 in)
- Weight: 65 kg (143 lb)

Cycling career
- Sport: Cycling
- Current team: Colombia
- Discipline: BMX racing
- Role: Rider
Medal record
Representing Colombia
Men's BMX racing
Event	1st	2nd	3rd
Olympic Games	0	0	2
World Junior Championships	1	1	0
World Cup	0	1	1
World Cup rounds	1	3	5
Pan American Games	0	0	1
Pan American Championships	0	3	0
CAC Games	1	2	0
South American Games	0	0	1
Bolivarian Games	1	2	0
Total	4	12	10
Olympic Games
Bronze medal – third place	2016 Rio de Janeiro	BMX racing
Bronze medal – third place	2020 Tokyo	BMX racing
World Cup
Silver medal – second place	2021	BMX racing
Bronze medal – third place	2020	BMX racing
Pan American Games
Bronze medal – third place	2023 Santiago	BMX racing
Pan American Championships
Silver medal – second place	2016 Santiago del Estero	BMX racing
Silver medal – second place	2023 Riobamba	BMX racing
Silver medal – second place	2026 Bogotá	BMX racing
Central American and Caribbean Games
Gold medal – first place	2014 Veracruz	BMX racing
Silver medal – second place	2018 Barranquilla	BMX racing
Silver medal – second place	2026 Santo Domingo	BMX racing
South American Games
Bronze medal – third place	2018 Cochabamba	BMX racing
Bolivarian Games
Gold medal – first place	2017 Santa Marta	BMX racing
Silver medal – second place	2013 Trujillo	BMX time trial
Silver medal – second place	2017 Santa Marta	BMX time trial
World Junior Championships
Gold medal – first place	2012 Birmingham	BMX racing
Silver medal – second place	2012 Birmingham	BMX time trial

Carlos Alberto Ramírez Yepes (born 12 March 1994) is a Colombian BMX rider. He earned a bronze medal in the BMX in the 2016 Rio Summer Olympics and another in the 2020 Tokyo Summer Olympics.

== Biography ==
Ramírez started cycling at around five years old at the initiative of his parents. When he first started BMX, he practised in the city of Medellín. His skill in BMX has earned him the nickname "The Little Magician" (El Pequeño Mago in Spanish). At eight years old, Ramírez won the July 2002 UCI BMX World Championship in Brazil.

In 2012, Ramírez finished first in the junior men's category of the BMX Cycling World Championship held in Birmingham, United Kingdom. He also obtained second place in the junior men's time trial modality.

In the 2016 Summer Olympic Games, Ramírez finished third in a photo finish, despite beginning the race in the last position. In the following Summer Olympics held in Tokyo, Ramírez won first place in the rankings for two days and won another Olympic bronze medal in the final.

The Mayor's Office of Bogotá changed the name of its BMX track in Parque El Salitre in Ramínez's honour.

== BMX World Championships ==
YEAR	COUNTRY	CITY	POSITION
2019	Belgium	Zolder	DNF (semifinals)
2018	Azerbaijan	Bakú	DNF (semifinals)
2017	United States	Rock Hill	Quarter finals
2016	Colombia	Medellín	8th
2015	Belgium	Zolder	Quarter finals
2014	Netherlands	Rotterdam	4th
2013	New Zealand	Auckland	DNF (quarter finals)
2012	England	Birmingham	Junior World Champion 2nd Junior Time Trial
2011	Denmark	Copenhague	4th place
2010	South Africa	Pietermaritzburg	2nd place/Runner-up
2009	Australia	Adelaida	3rd place
2008	China	Taiyuan	7th place
2007	Canada	Victoria	5th place
2006	Brazil	São Paulo	3rd place
2005	France	Paris	5th place
2004	Netherlands	Valkenswaard	8th place
2003	Australia	Perth	2nd place/Runner-up
2002	Brazil	Paulina	World Champion

== Best participations in BMX World Cups ==
Group of races in the Elite category, which allows athletes to maintain activity and competition during the Olympic cycles.

Summary of the best BMX World Cups - Carlos Ramírez
YEAR	COUNTRY	CITY	POSITION
2021	Colombia	Bogotá	Runner-up (2nd place)
2020	United States	Houston	Canceled due to the COVID-19 pandemic
2020	Australia	Shepparton	Runner-up (2nd place)
2020	Australia	Barthurs	4th
2017	Argentina	Santiago del Estero	Runner-up (2nd place)
2016	Netherlands	Papendal	3rd
2013	United States	Chula Vista	3rd
2012	Netherlands	Papendal	4th (Junior runner)

== UCI BMX individual historical ranking ==
YEAR	RANKING
2020	3rd
2019	14th
2018	4th
2017	10th
2016	2nd
2015	34th
2014	18th
2013	31st
2012	1st
2011	8th

== Gallery ==
Carlos Alberto Ramírez Yepes
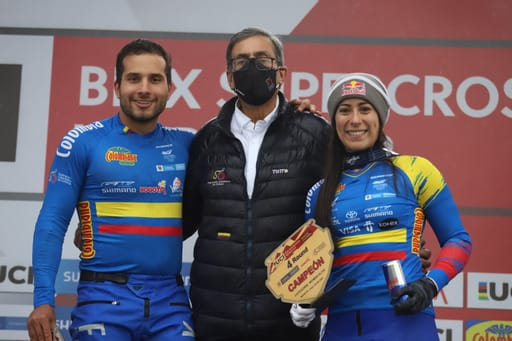
Ramírez on the podium of the Bogotá World BMX Championships.

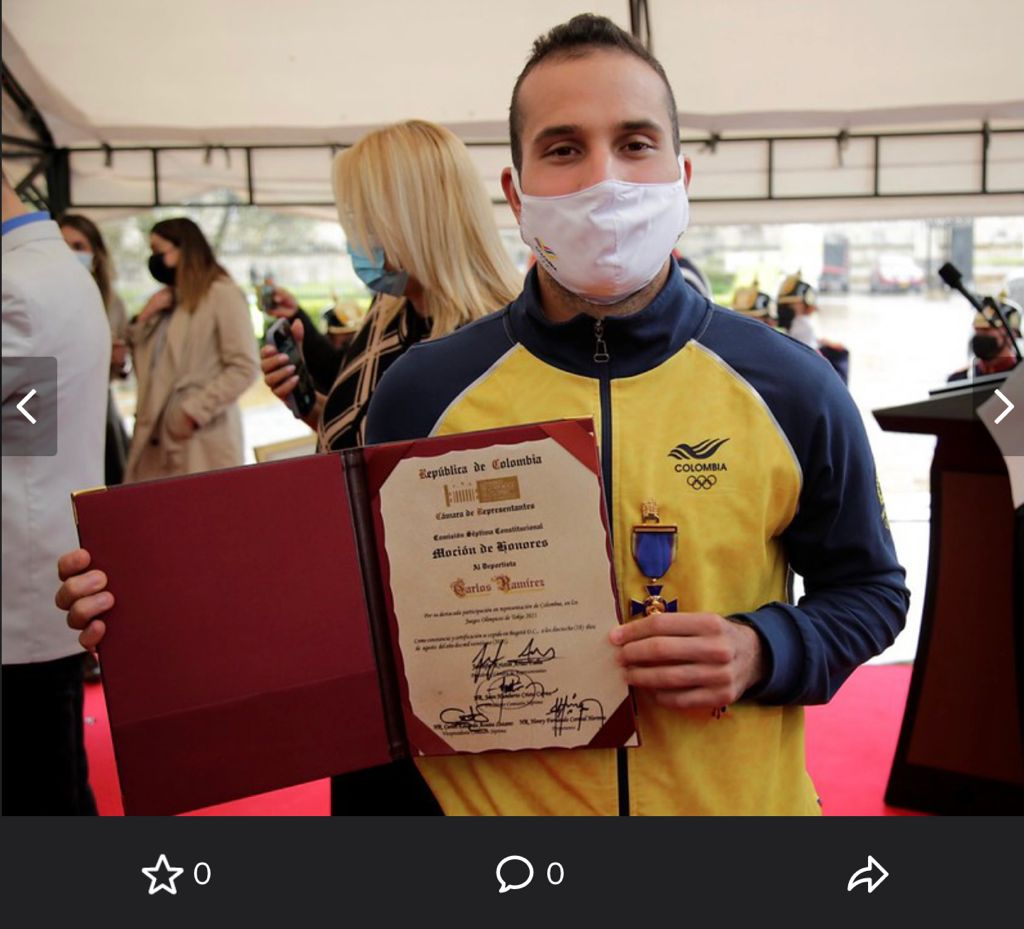
Ramírez receives a Motion of Honour with his respective decoration from the Colombian government.

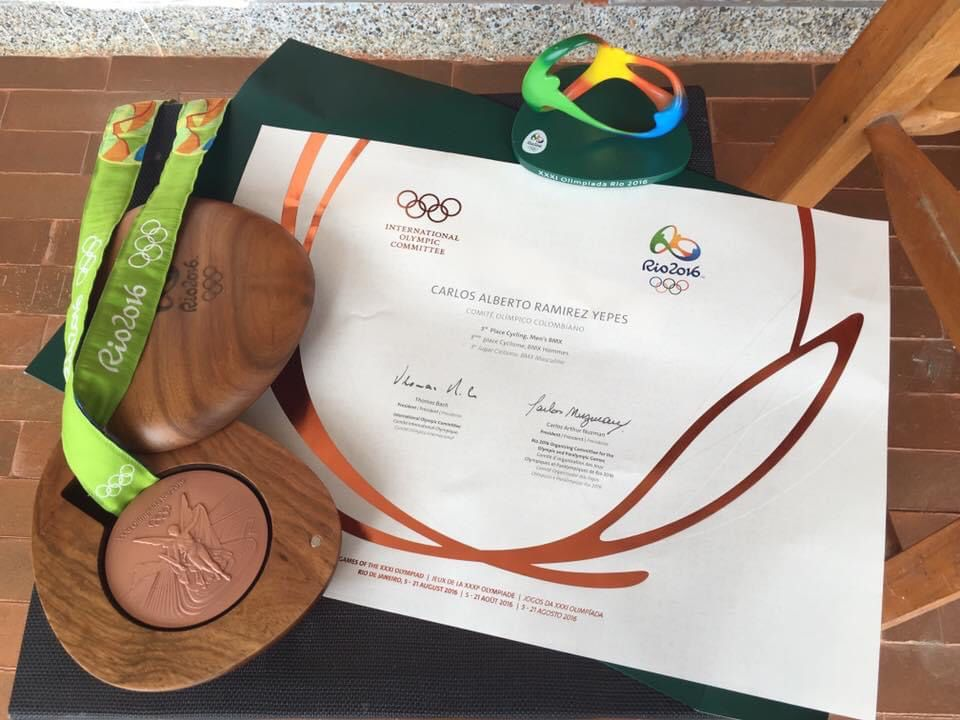
Ramírez's 2016 Summer Olympics bronze medal.

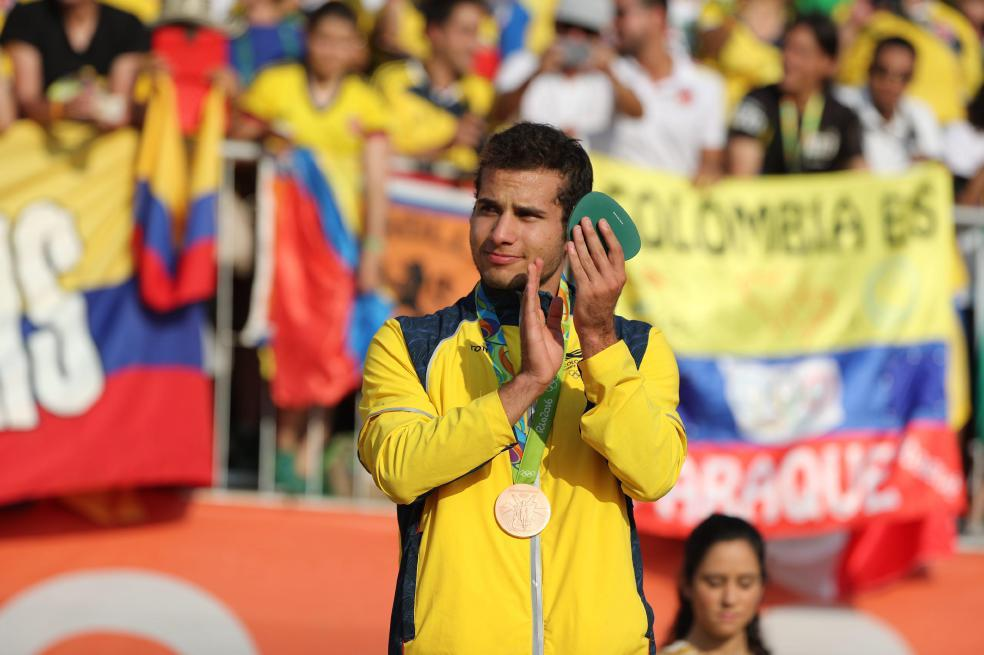
Ramírez in 2016.

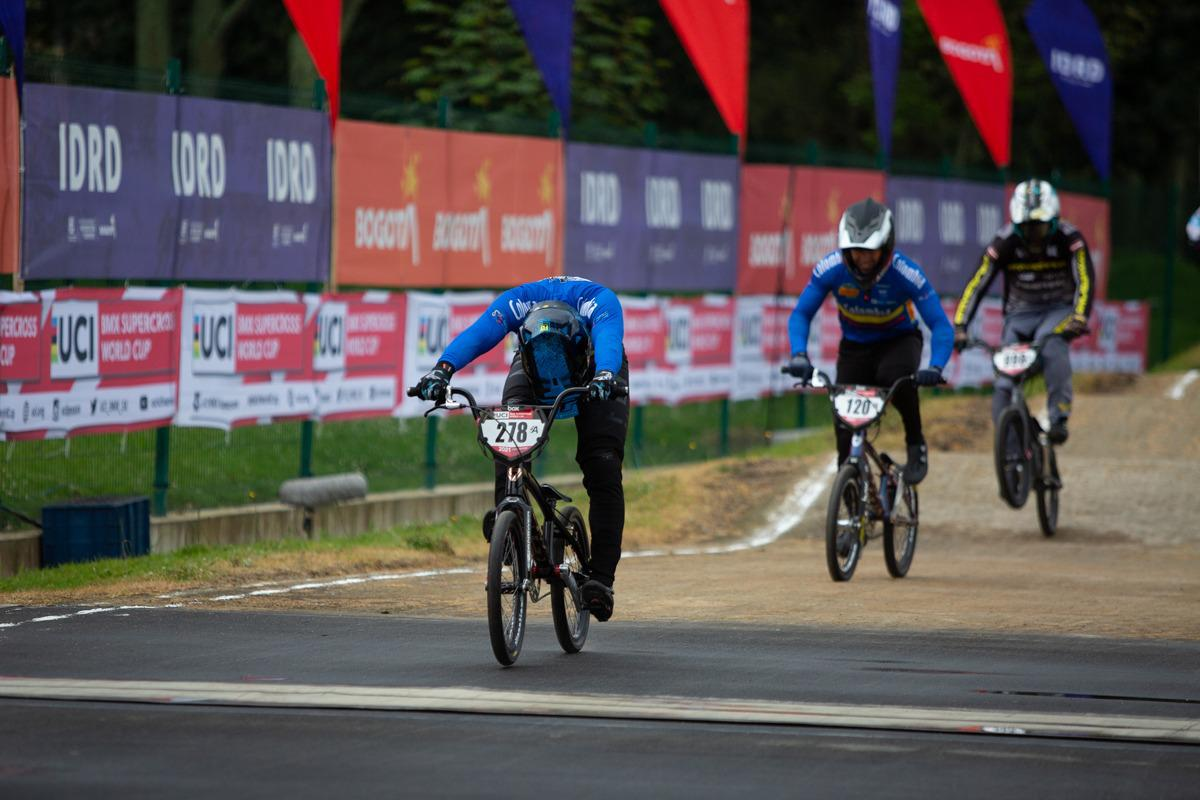
Ramínez racing at Bogotá.

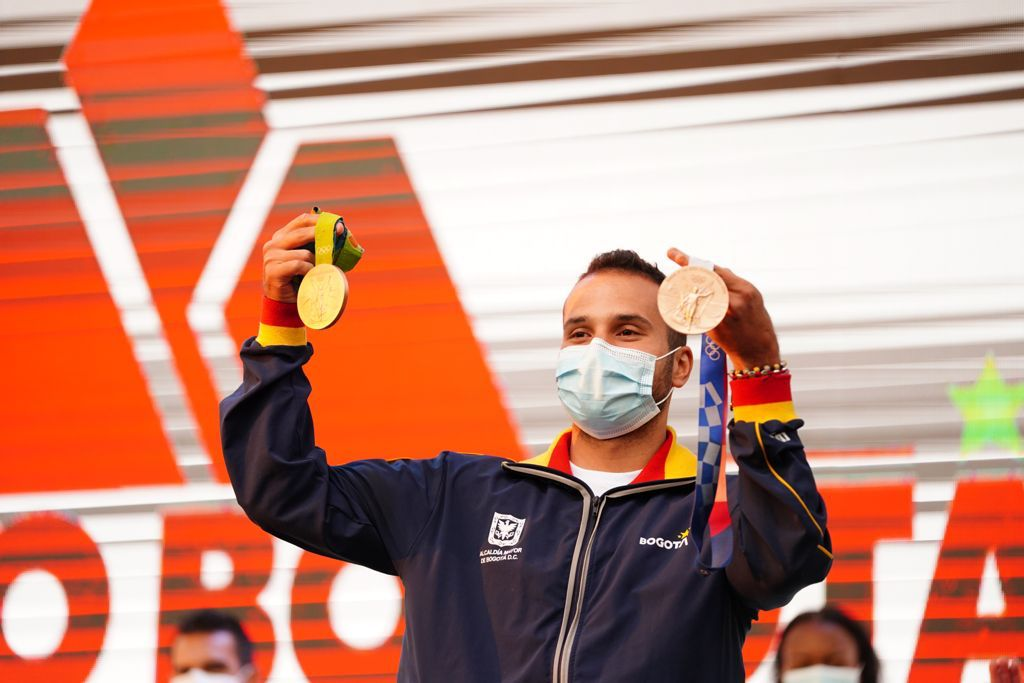
Ramírez with showing his medals at Bogotá.

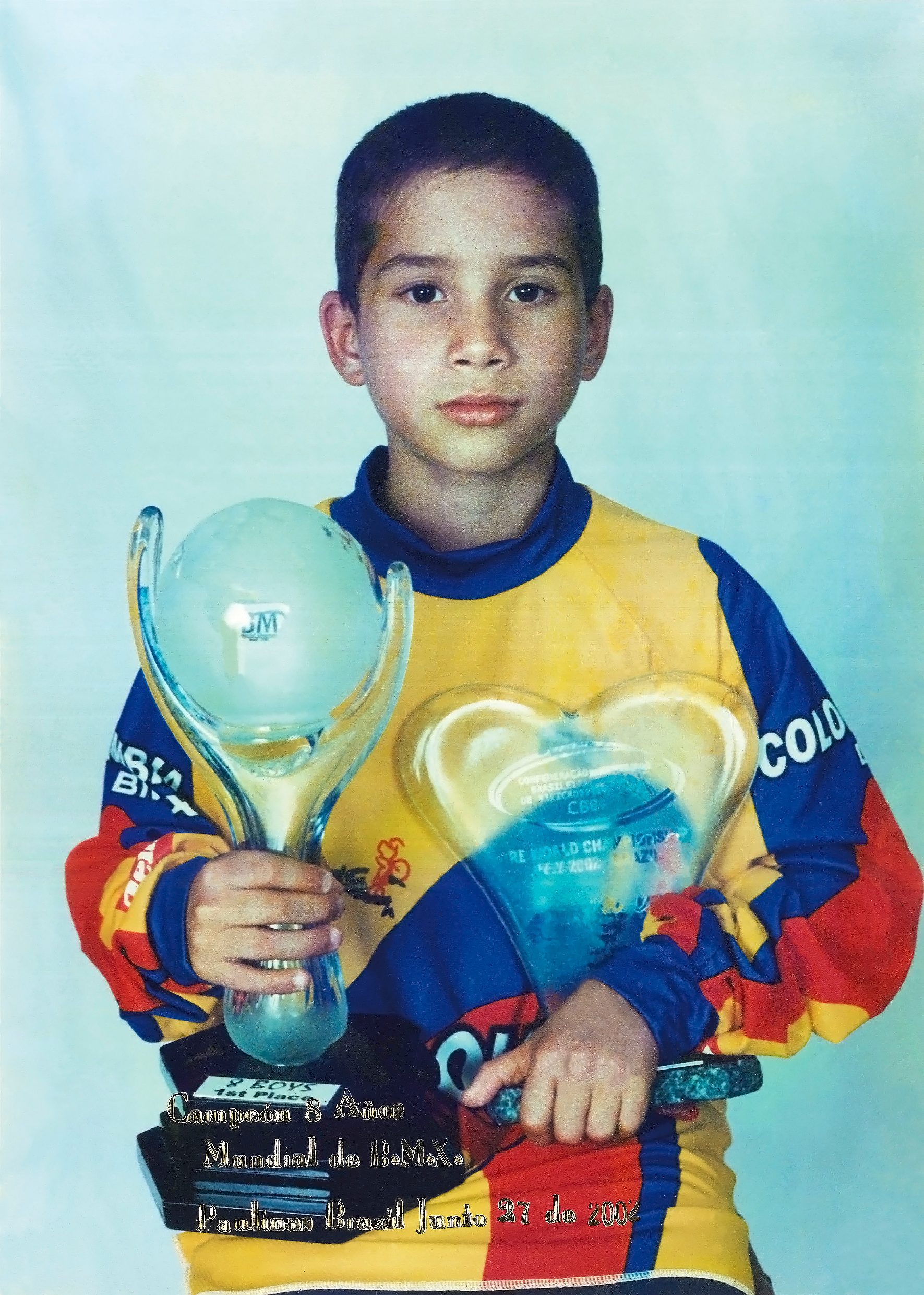
Ramínez in 2002 with his BMX World Championship trophy.
