= Cycling at the 2024 Summer Olympics – Women's BMX racing =

Women's BMX racing at the Games of the XXXIII Olympiad
- Olympic BMX cycling
- Venue: Vélodrome National de Saint-Quentin-en-Yvelines
- Date: 1–2 August 2024
- Competitors: 24 from 17 nations
- Winning time: 34.231 sec

Medalists
1st place, gold medalist(s)		Saya Sakakibara	Australia
2nd place, silver medalist(s)		Manon Veenstra	Netherlands
3rd place, bronze medalist(s)		Zoé Claessens	Switzerland

The women's BMX racing competition at the 2024 Summer Olympics took place on 1 and 2 August 2024 at the Vélodrome National de Saint-Quentin-en-Yvelines.

== Background ==
This will be the 5th appearance of the event, which has been held at every Summer Olympics since BMX racing was added to the programme in 2008.

== Qualification ==
A National Olympic Committee (NOC) could enter up to three qualified cyclists in the BMX race. Quota places are allocated to the NOC, which selects the cyclists. There were 24 quota places available, allocated as follows:

- UCI nation ranking (17 places): The top two NOCs each earn three places. NOCs ranked third to fifth each earn two places. NOCs ranked sixth through 10th each earn one place. Each continent was guaranteed one place.
- UCI elite individual ranking (three places): Outside Europe and Oceania, the highest-ranked NOC will secure a single quota place at the BMX continental championships for Africa, Asia, and the Americas.
- 2023 & 2024 World Championships (four place): The remaining four spots will be allocated to the top BMX riders competing at the 2023 UCI World Championships in Glasgow and at the 2024 Worlds in Rock Hill, South Carolina.
- Host place (one place): Host nation France was guaranteed one place.

== Competition format ==
The competition was a three-round tournament, with quarterfinals, semifinals, and a final. In each round, the cyclists raced around a 400 metres (1,300 ft) course with jumps and banked turns. The competition proceeded as follows:

- Quarterfinals: three heats of eight cyclists each. Each heat had three runs, using a point-for-place system (one point for the winner of a run, two points for second, etc.), with the lowest points over the three runs winning. The best six cyclists in each heat (12 total) advanced to the semifinals, and the riders ranked 13–20 move to a last chance qualifier. In the last-chance qualifier, those eight riders race one time, and the top-four finishers advance to the semifinals, while the others cyclists were eliminated.
- Semifinals: two heats of eight cyclists each. Again there were three runs per heat, using the point-for-place system. The top four cyclists in each semifinal (eight total) advanced to the final; the others (eight cyclists) were eliminated. In both the quarterfinals and the semifinals, riders are reseeded for the next heat according to time. If two or more riders are equal in points at the end of three runs, the times will be used to break the tie.
- Final: one final of eight cyclists. There was only a single run.

== Schedule ==
The event will take place over two consecutive days.

All times are Central European Time (UTC+2)

Date	Time	Round
1 August	20:20	Quarterfinals
1 August	22:15	Last chance race
2 August	20:15	Semifinals
2 August	21:50	Final

== Results ==
=== Quarterfinals ===
Rank	#	Name	Nation	1st run		2nd run		3rd run		Total	Notes
Rank	#	Name	Nation	Heat	Time	Heat	Time	Heat	Time	Total	Notes
1	77	Saya Sakakibara	Australia	1	34.549 (1)	1	34.376 (1)	1	34.515 (1)	3	Q
2	911	Beth Shriever	Great Britain	3	34.688 (2)	2	34.421 (2)	2	34.590 (2)	3	Q
3	11	Alise Willoughby	United States	2	35.459 (4)	3	35.033 (3)	3	35.483 (4)	3	Q
4	44	Molly Simpson	Canada	3	35.752 (5)	2	35.508 (6)	1	35.311 (3)	7	Q
5	61	Manon Veenstra	Netherlands	1	35.872 (6)	1	35.042 (4)	3	35.520 (5)	7	Q
6	110	Laura Smulders	Netherlands	1	35.076 (3)	3	35.728 (9)	3	35.792 (8)	8	Q
7	31	Daleny Vaughn	United States	2	36.099 (9)	3	36.482 (14)	2	36.360 (10)	8	Q
8	2	Zoé Claessens	Switzerland	3	36.018 (8)	2	35.423 (5)	2	36.393 (11)	8	Q
9	21	Lauren Reynolds	Australia	1	35.952 (7)	1	35.564 (7)	1	35.589 (6)	10	Q
10	22	Merel Smulders	Netherlands	1	36.137 (10)	3	35.760 (10)	3	35.649 (7)	11	Q
11	94	Nadine Aeberhard	Switzerland	3	36.588 (12)	1	35.654 (8)	2	37.099 (17)	15	Q
12	13	Axelle Étienne	France	3	36.354 (11)	2	1:00.895 (24)	1	36.050 (9)	16	Q
13	14	Gabriela Bolle	Colombia	3	38.211 (20)	2	37.266 (17)	2	36.593 (12	16	q
14	100	Mariana Pajón	Colombia	2	37.832 (19)	1	35.847 (11)	2	36.823 (14)	16	q
15	203	Paola Reis	Brazil	1	37.101 (14)	2	36.259 (12)	1	36.998 (15)	16	q
16	175	Malene Kejlstrup	Denmark	2	37.270 (16)	3	36.762 (15)	3	37.629 (20)	16	q
17	7	Leila Walker	New Zealand	2	36.974 (13)	1	36.288 (13)	1	38.347 (22)	17	q
18	218	Veronika Stūriška	Latvia	1	37.206 (15)	3	37.007 (16)	3	37.120 (18)	19	q
19	215	Aiko Gommers	Belgium	3	37.315 (17)	2	37.329 (18)	1	37.362 (19)	19	q
20	85	Sae Hatakeyama	Japan	1	DNF (24)	1	37.953 (19)	1	36.720 (13)	20	q
21	230	Alina Beck	Germany	2	38.371 (21)	3	39.874 (21)	3	37.017 (16)	20	
22	23	Felicia Stancil	United States	2	37.732 (18)	1	46.155 (23)	2	37.763 (21)	20	
23	101	Shanayah Howell	Aruba	3	39.325 (22)	3	38.889 (20)	2	39.492 (23)	23	
24	209	Miyanda Maseti	South Africa	2	43.011 (23)	2	42.401 (22)	3	43.210 (24)	23	

=== Last chance race ===
Rank	#	Name	Time	Notes
1	100	Mariana Pajón (COL)	36.015	Q
2	85	Sae Hatakeyama (JPN)	37.068	Q
3	14	Gabriela Bolle (COL)	37.373	Q
4	175	Malene Kejlstrup (DEN)	37.375	Q
5	215	Aiko Gommers (BEL)	37.819	
6	7	Leila Walker (NZL)	38.362	
7	203	Paola Reis (BRA)	2:14.343	
8	218	Veronika Stūriška (LAT)	2:15.767	

=== Semifinals ===
Rank	#	Name	1st run		2nd run		3rd run		Total	Notes
Rank	#	Name	Heat	Time	Heat	Time	Heat	Time	Total	Notes
1	77	Saya Sakakibara (AUS)	1	34.162 (1)	1	34.847 (1)	2	34.189 (1)	3	Q
2	911	Beth Shriever (GBR)	2	34.297 (1)	2	34.339 (1)	1	34.326 (1)	3	Q
3	61	Manon Veenstra (NED)	1	35.016 (3)	1	35.178 (2)	1	35.543 (4)	9	Q
4	110	Laura Smulders (NED)	1	36.165 (4)	2	35.128 (2)	2	35.610 (3)	9	Q
5	11	Alise Willoughby (USA)	1	34.892 (2)	2	36.624 (7)	1	34.833 (2)	11	Q
6	2	Zoé Claessens (SUI)	2	36.235 (5)	1	35.206 (3)	1	34.848 (3)	11	Q
7	44	Molly Simpson (CAN)	2	35.599 (2)	1	35.953 (4)	1	36.349 (5)	11	Q
8	13	Axelle Étienne (FRA)	1	37.202 (6)	2	36.244 (5)	2	36.413 (4)	15	Q
9	100	Mariana Pajón (COL)	1	36.802 (5)	2	35.649 (3)	2	40.796 (7)	15	
10	21	Lauren Reynolds (AUS)	2	35.814 (3)	2	35.917 (4)	2	52.185 (8)	15	
11	31	Daleny Vaughn (USA)	2	36.181 (4)	1	37.333 (6)	1	36.910 (6)	16	
12	22	Merel Smulders (NED)	2	REL	1	37.459 (7)	2	35.057 (2)	19	
13	94	Nadine Aeberhard (SUI)	1	DNF	2	36.334 (6)	2	36.517 (5)	19	
14	14	Gabriela Bolle (COL)	2	37.232 (6)	1	36.199 (5)	1	37.795 (8)	19	
15	175	Malene Kejlstrup (DEN)	1	37.493 (7)	1	37.861 (8)	2	37.454 (6)	21	
16	85	Sae Hatakeyama (JPN)	2	37.600 (7)	2	38.154 (8)	1	37.207 (7)	22	

=== Final ===
Rank	#	Name	Time	Notes
1st place, gold medalist(s)	77	Saya Sakakibara (AUS)	34.231	
2nd place, silver medalist(s)	61	Manon Veenstra (NED)	34.954	
3rd place, bronze medalist(s)	2	Zoé Claessens (SUI)	35.060	
4	110	Laura Smulders (NED)	35.745	
5	44	Molly Simpson (CAN)	35.833	
6	11	Alise Willoughby (USA)	36.171	
7	13	Axelle Étienne (FRA)	36.273	
8	911	Beth Shriever (GBR)	36.496	
