= Cycling at the 2020 Summer Olympics – Women's BMX racing =

Olympic cycling event

Women's BMX racing at the Games of the XXXII Olympiad
- Olympic BMX cycling
- Venue: Ariake Urban Sports Park
- Date: 29–30 July 2021
- Competitors: 24 from 17 nations
- Winning time: 44.358 s

Medalists
1st place, gold medalist(s)		Beth Shriever	Great Britain
2nd place, silver medalist(s)		Mariana Pajón	Colombia
3rd place, bronze medalist(s)		Merel Smulders	Netherlands

The women's BMX racing competition at the 2020 Summer Olympics took place on 29 and 30 July 2021 at the Ariake Urban Sports Park. 24 cyclists from 17 nations competed in the event.

== Background ==
This was the 4th appearance of the event, which has been held at every Summer Olympics since BMX racing was added to the programme in 2008.

The reigning Olympic champion was Mariana Pajón of Colombia, who also won gold in 2012, and the reigning (2019) World Champion was Alise Willoughby of the United States. Willoughby suffered a crash and did not qualify for the final.

A preview by Olympics.com noted the favourites as Pajón, Willoughby, Laura Smulders of the Netherlands (2018 World Champion), and Saya Sakakibara of Australia. Sakakibara also suffered a crash and did not qualify for the final.

== Qualification ==
A National Olympic Committee (NOC) could enter up to three qualified cyclists in the BMX race. Quota places are allocated to the NOC, which selects the cyclists. There were 24 quota places available, allocated as follows:

- UCI nation ranking (18 places): The top two NOCs each earn three places. NOCs ranked third to fifth each earn two places. NOCs ranked sixth through 11th each earn one place. Each continent was guaranteed one place.
- UCI elite individual ranking (three places): The three NOCs with the top individuals on this ranking, which have not yet earned any quota places, each earn one place.
- 2020 World Championships (two places): The top two NOCs at the 2020 UCI BMX World Championships, which have not yet earned any quota places, each earn one place. Because the 2020 World Championships were cancelled due to the COVID-19 pandemic, these places were reallocated to the UCI nation ranking.
- Host place (one place): Host nation Japan was guaranteed one place.

== Competition format ==
The competition was a three-round tournament, with quarterfinals, semifinals, and a final. The time-trial seeding run from previous Games was eliminated. In each round, the cyclists raced around a 400 metres (1,300 ft) course with jumps and banked turns. The competition proceeded as follows:

- Quarterfinals: four heats of six cyclists each. Each heat had three runs, using a point-for-place system (one point for the winner of a run, two points for second, etc.), with the lowest points over the three runs winning. The best four cyclists in each heat (16 total) advanced to the semifinals; the others (eight cyclists) were eliminated.
- Semifinals: two heats of eight cyclists each. Again there were three runs per heat, using the point-for-place system. The top four cyclists in each semifinal (eight total) advanced to the final; the others (eight cyclists) were eliminated.
- Final: one final of eight cyclists. There was only a single run.

== Schedule ==
The event took place over two consecutive days.

H	Heats	QF	Quarterfinals	SF	Semifinals	F	Finals

BMX, mountain biking and road cycling
Event↓/Date →	24 July	25 July	26 July	27 July	28 July	29 July	30 July		31 Jul	1 Aug
BMX Racing
Women's BMX racing						QF	SF	F		

== Results ==
=== Quarterfinals ===
==== Heat 1 ====
Rank	#	Name	1st run	2nd run	3rd run	Total	Notes
1	100	Mariana Pajón (COL)	45.659 (1)	45.576 (1)	46.118 (1)	3	Q
2	210	Simone Christensen (DEN)	46.299 (3)	45.576 (2)	46.542 (2)	7	Q
3	22	Merel Smulders (NED)	46.106 (2)	48.049 (3)	48.751 (5)	10	Q
4	91	Elke Vanhoof (BEL)	46.939 (4)	49.360 (5)	47.190 (3)	12	Q
5	215	Payton Ridenour (USA)	48.434 (5)	48.156 (4)	47.393 (4)	13	
6	213	Chutikan Kitwanitsathian (THA)	1:00.717 (6)	59.502 (6)	1:00.786 (6)	18	

==== Heat 2 ====
Rank	#	Name	1st run	2nd run	3rd run	Total	Notes
1	110	Laura Smulders (NED)	44.907 (2)	45.381 (1)	45.572 (1)	4	Q
2	6	Felicia Stancil (USA)	44.412 (1)	46.772 (2)	46.277 (2)	5	Q
3	3	Axelle Étienne (FRA)	45.270 (3)	47.405 (3)	47.524 (3)	9	Q
4	155	Drew Mechielsen (CAN)	47.393 (4)	48.246 (4)	49.128 (5)	13	Q
5	41	Natalia Suvorova (ROC)	48.318 (5)	49.120 (5)	48.266 (4)	14	
6	93	Priscilla Carnaval (BRA)	48.740 (6)	51.336 (6)	51.626 (6)	18	

==== Heat 3 ====
Rank	#	Name	1st run	2nd run	3rd run	Total	Notes
1	911	Beth Shriever (GBR)	45.268 (1)	44.660 (1)	44.924 (3)	5	Q
2	209	Zoé Claessens (SUI)	45.622 (2)	45.429 (3)	44.711 (2)	7	Q
3	21	Lauren Reynolds (AUS)	46.030 (3)	45.384 (2)	45.454 (4)	8	Q
4	88	Saya Sakakibara (AUS)	58.446 (6)	45.597 (4)	44.690 (1)	11	Q
5	971	Manon Valentino (FRA)	48.549 (5)	46.945 (5)	47.091 (5)	15	
6	212	Vineta Pētersone (LAT)	48.043 (4)	47.875 (6)	47.321 (6)	16	

==== Heat 4 ====
Rank	#	Name	1st run	2nd run	3rd run	Total	Notes
1	1	Alise Willoughby (USA)	46.703 (1)	47.741 (1)	45.410 (1)	3	Q
2	4	Judy Baauw (NED)	49.797 (2)	48.220 (2)	47.503 (3)	7	Q
3	308	Rebecca Petch (NZL)	2:01.322 (5)	48.508 (3)	46.823 (2)	10	Q
4	116	Natalia Afremova (ROC)	54.821 (4)	49.100 (4)	47.807 (4)	12	Q
5	156	Doménica Azuero (ECU)	51.239 (3)	54.593 (5)	49.979 (5)	13	
6	85	Sae Hatakeyama (JPN)	DNF (6)	DNS (8)	DNS (8)	22	

=== Semifinals ===
==== Heat 1 ====
Rank	#	Name	1st run	2nd run	3rd run	Total	Notes
1	6	Felicia Stancil (USA)	46.731 (2)	45.686 (4)	45.855 (1)	7	Q
2	100	Mariana Pajón (COL)	46.167 (1)	45.052 (2)	48.666 (5)	8	Q
3	22	Merel Smulders (NED)	48.076 (6)	45.950 (5)	47.212 (3)	14	Q
4	155	Drew Mechielsen (CAN)	47.365 (3)	46.704 (7)	47.366 (4)	14	Q
5	88	Saya Sakakibara (AUS)	47.618 (5)	44.927 (1)	DNF (8)	14	
6	308	Rebecca Petch (NZL)	47.597 (4)	46.095 (6)	50.761 (6)	16	
7	209	Zoé Claessens (SUI)	1:05.583 (7)	47.149 (8)	46.224 (2)	17	
8	1	Alise Willoughby (USA)	DNF (8)	45.201 (3)	1:37.566 (7)	18	

==== Heat 2 ====
Rank	#	Name	1st run	2nd run	3rd run	Total	Notes
1	911	Beth Shriever (GBR)	45.687 (1)	45.155 (1)	44.807 (1)	3	Q
2	210	Simone Christensen (DEN)	46.659 (2)	45.751 (4)	45.358 (4)	10	Q
3	3	Axelle Étienne (FRA)	58.865 (6)	45.645 (3)	45.095 (2)	11	Q
4	21	Lauren Reynolds (AUS)	1:09.159 (7)	45.497 (2)	45.317 (3)	12	Q
5	116	Natalia Afremova (ROC)	49.337 (4)	46.479 (5)	46.633 (6)	15	
6	91	Elke Vanhoof (BEL)	49.254 (3)	46.744 (6)	47.223 (7)	16	
7	4	Judy Baauw (NED)	58.806 (5)	47.387 (7)	45.487 (5)	17	
8	110	Laura Smulders (NED)	DNF (8)	56.676 (8)	49.580 (8)	24	

=== Final ===
Rank	#	Name	Time
1st place, gold medalist(s)	911	Beth Shriever (GBR)	44.358
2nd place, silver medalist(s)	100	Mariana Pajón (COL)	44.448
3rd place, bronze medalist(s)	22	Merel Smulders (NED)	44.721
4	6	Felicia Stancil (USA)	45.131
5	21	Lauren Reynolds (AUS)	45.401
6	210	Simone Christensen (DEN)	45.582
7	3	Axelle Étienne (FRA)	45.853
8	155	Drew Mechielsen (CAN)	46.883

== See also ==
- Cycling at the 2020 Summer Olympics – Men's BMX racing
- Cycling at the 2020 Summer Olympics – Women's keirin
- Cycling at the 2020 Summer Olympics – Women's BMX freestyle
