= European BMX Championships =

Sporting competition

European BMX Championships are the main BMX sport championships in Europe, organised by the UEC, the European confederation for cycle sports.

== Editions ==
Number	Year	Country	City
1	1982	Netherlands	Beek en Donk
2	1983	United Kingdom; France	Birmingham; Dijon
3	1984	United Kingdom	Birmingham
4	1985	Spain	Palau de Plegamans
5	1986	Germany	Weiterstadt
6	1987	Belgium	Houthalen
7	1988	Netherlands	Slagharen
8	1989	Denmark	Aalborg
9	1990	Switzerland	Littau
10	1991	United Kingdom	Slough
11	1992	Italy	Padua
12	1993	Sweden	Märsta
13	1994	Austria	Vienna
14	1995	France	Vallet
15	1996–2013	Multiple locations	
16	2014	Denmark	Roskilde
17	2015	Netherlands	Erp
18	2016	Italy	Verona
19	2017	France	Bordeaux
20	2018	United Kingdom	Glasgow
21	2019	Latvia	Valmiera
22	2021	Belgium	Zolder
23	2022	Belgium	Dessel
24	2023	France	Besançon
25	2024	Italy	Verona
26	2025	Latvia	Valmiera
27	2026	France	Sarrians

== Championships ==
=== 2011/2012 ===
==== Men ====
Stage	Host	Winner	Runner-Up	Third
I	(Netherlands) Valkenswaard	Damien Godet (FRA)	Thomas Hamon (FRA)	Rihards Veide (LAT)
II	(Netherlands) Valkenswaard	Moana Moo Caille (FRA)	Edžus Treimanis (LAT)	Rihards Veide (LAT)
III	(Czech Republic) Klatovy	Edžus Treimanis (LAT)	Raymon Van Der Biezen (NED)	Benjamin Janssens (FRA)
IV	(Czech Republic) Klatovy	Raymon Van Der Biezen (NED)	Edžus Treimanis (LAT)	Rihards Veide (LAT)
V	(Switzerland) Geneva	Joris Daudet (FRA)	Edžus Treimanis (LAT)	Sylvain André (FRA)
VI	(Switzerland) Geneva	Joris Daudet (FRA)	Sylvain André (FRA)	Edžus Treimanis (LAT)
VII	(Belgium) Kortrijk	Brian Kirham (AUS)	Jelle van Gorkom (NED)	Edžus Treimanis (LAT)
VIII	(Belgium) Kortrijk	Brian Kirham (AUS)	Sylvain André (FRA)	Moana Moo Caille (FRA)
IX	(Italy) Creazzo	Rihards Veide (LAT)	Toms Mankus (LAT)	Fausto Andres Endara Madera (ECU)
X	(Italy) Creazzo	Rihards Veide (LAT)	Edžus Treimanis (LAT)	Jordy van der Heijden (NED)
XI	(France) Orléans	Joris Daudet (FRA)	Edžus Treimanis (LAT)	Jordy van der Heijden (NED)
XII	(France) Orléans	Joris Daudet (FRA)	Rihards Veide (LAT)	Toms Mankus (LAT)
Overall		Winner	Runner-Up	Third
		Edžus Treimanis (LAT)	Rihards Veide (LAT)	Jordy van der Heijden (NED)

==== Women ====
Stage	Host	Winner	Runner-Up	Third
I	(Netherlands) Valkenswaard	Magalie Pottier (FRA)	Aneta Hladíková (CZE)	Vilma Rimšaitė (LTU)
II	(Netherlands) Valkenswaard	Magalie Pottier (FRA)	Vilma Rimšaitė (LTU)	Aneta Hladikova (CZE)
III	(Czech Republic) Klatovy	Vilma Rimšaitė (LTU)	Jana Horáková (CZE)	Aneta Hladíková (CZE)
IV	(Czech Republic) Klatovy	Eva Ailloud (FRA)	Jana Horáková (CZE)	Vilma Rimšaitė (LTU)
V	(Switzerland) Geneva	Jana Horáková (CZE)	Eva Ailloud (FRA)	Maartje Hereijgers (NED)
VI	(Switzerland) Geneva	Manon Valentino (FRA)	Magalie Pottier (FRA)	Aneta Hladikova (CZE)
VII	(Belgium) Kortrijk	Shanaze Reade (GBR)	Magalie Pottier (FRA)	Laura Smulders (NED)
VIII	(Belgium) Kortrijk	Manon Valentino (FRA)	Shanaze Reade (GBR)	Eva Ailloud (FRA)
IX	(Italy) Creazzo	Eva Ailloud (FRA)	Romana Labounková (CZE)	Jana Horáková (CZE)
X	(Italy) Creazzo	Romana Labounková (CZE)	Eva Ailloud (FRA)	Vilma Rimšaitė (LTU)
XI	(France) Orléans	Laetitia Le Corguille (FRA)	Eike Vanhoof (BEL)	Eva Ailloud (FRA)
XII	(France) Orléans	Laetitia Le Corguille (FRA)	Romana Labounková (CZE)	Stefany Hernández (VEN)
Overall		Winner	Runner-Up	Third
		Eva Ailloud (FRA)	Jana Horáková (CZE)	Aneta Hladíková (CZE)

=== 2013 ===
==== Men ====
Stage	Host	Winner	Runner-Up	Third
I	(France) Messigny-et-Vantoux	Māris Štrombergs (LAT)	Quentin Caleyron (FRA)	Edžus Treimanis (LAT)
II	(France) Messigny-et-Vantoux	Māris Štrombergs (LAT)	Quentin Caleyron (FRA)	Edžus Treimanis (LAT)
III	(Czech Republic) Pardubice	Māris Štrombergs (LAT)	Edžus Treimanis (LAT)	Toms Mankus (LAT)
IV	(Czech Republic) Pardubice	Māris Štrombergs (LAT)	Toms Mankus (LAT)	Rihards Veide (LAT)
V	(Germany) Weiterstadt	Māris Štrombergs (LAT)	Edžus Treimanis (LAT)	Jelle van Gorkom (NED)
VI	(Germany) Weiterstadt	Māris Štrombergs (LAT)	Edžus Treimanis (LAT)	Sylvain André (FRA)
VII	(Sweden) Ängelholm	Māris Štrombergs (LAT)	Sylvain André (FRA)	Edžus Treimanis (LAT)
VIII	(Sweden) Ängelholm	Corben Sharrah (USA)	Māris Štrombergs (LAT)	Quentin Caleyron (FRA)
IX	(Latvia) Riga	Quentin Caleyron (FRA)	Māris Štrombergs (LAT)	Sylvain André (FRA)
X	(Latvia) Riga	Edžus Treimanis (LAT)	Māris Štrombergs (LAT)	Carlos Ramírez (COL)
XI	(Belgium) Dessel	Edžus Treimanis (LAT)	Rihards Veide (LAT)	Twan van Gendt (NED)
XII	(Belgium) Dessel	Raymon van der Biezen (NED)	Rihards Veide (LAT)	Martijn Jaspers (NED)
Overall		Winner	Runner-Up	Third
		Māris Štrombergs (LAT)	Edžus Treimanis (LAT)	Quentin Caleyron (FRA)

==== Women ====
Stage	Host	Winner	Runner-Up	Third
I	(France) Messigny-et-Vantoux	Shanaze Reade (GBR)	Merle van Benthem (NED)	Manon Valentino (FRA)
II	(France) Messigny-et-Vantoux	Shanaze Reade (GBR)	Merle van Benthem (NED)	Simone Christensen (DEN)
III	(Czech Republic) Pardubice	Manon Valentino (FRA)	Vilma Rimšaitė (LTU)	Eva Ailloud (FRA)
IV	(Czech Republic) Pardubice	Eva Ailloud (FRA)	Merle van Benthem (NED)	Aneta Hladikova (CZE)
V	(Germany) Weiterstadt	Manon Valentino (FRA)	Laura Smulders (NED)	Simone Christensen (DEN)
VI	(Germany) Weiterstadt	Manon Valentino (FRA)	Laura Smulders (NED)	Stefany Hernández (VEN)
VII	(Sweden) Ängelholm	Manon Valentino (FRA)	Nadja Pries (GER)	Simone Christensen (DEN)
VIII	(Sweden) Ängelholm	Vilma Rimšaitė (LTU)	Sandra Aleksejeva (LAT)	Nadja Pries (GER)
IX	(Latvia) Riga	Manon Valentino (FRA)	Vilma Rimšaitė (LTU)	Romana Labounková (CZE)
X	(Latvia) Riga	Manon Valentino (FRA)	Vilma Rimšaitė (LTU)	Aneta Hladikova (CZE)
XI	(Belgium) Dessel	Laura Smulders (NED)	Manon Valentino (FRA)	Elke Vanhoof (BEL)
XII	(Belgium) Dessel	Manon Valentino (FRA)	Laura Smulders (NED)	Vilma Rimšaitė (LTU)
Overall		Winner	Runner-Up	Third
		Manon Valentino (FRA)	Vilma Rimšaitė (LTU)	Elke Vanhoof (BEL)

=== 2014 ===
From 2014 multi-stage championships were replaced by one day championships. Although same format multi-stage European League were established, but the winner of the League do not hold the right to be named European champion.

=== 2017 ===
The 2017 European BMX Championships was held in Bordeaux, France, between 14 and 16 July 2017.

Event	Gold	Silver	Bronze
Men
Elite men	Joris Daudet (FRA)	Twan van Gendt (NED)	Sylvain André (FRA)
Junior men	Cédric Butti (SUI)	Gil Brunner (SUI)	Titouan Blanchod (FRA)
Women
Elite women	Laura Smulders (NED)	Elke Vanhoof (BEL)	Simone Christensen (DEN)
Junior women	Blaine Ridge-Davis (GBR)	Vineta Pētersone (LAT)	Vanesa Buldinska (LAT)

=== 2018 ===
The 2018 European BMX Championships was held in Glasgow, United Kingdom, between 10 and 11 August 2018.

Event	Gold	Silver	Bronze
Elite men	Kyle Evans (GBR)	Kye Whyte (GBR)	Sylvain André (FRA)
Elite women	Laura Smulders (NED)	Simone Christensen (DEN)	Yaroslava Bondarenko (RUS)

=== 2019 ===
The 2019 European BMX Championships was held in Valmiera, Latvia, between 11 and 14 July 2019.

Event	Gold	Silver	Bronze
Elite men	Niek Kimmann (NED)	Twan van Gendt (NED)	Dave van der Burg (NED)
Elite women	Laura Smulders (NED)	Judy Baauw (NED)	Simone Christensen (DEN)

=== 2021 ===
The 2021 European BMX Championships was held in Heusden-Zolder, Belgium, between 8 and 11 July 2021.

Event	Gold	Silver	Bronze
Elite men	Arthur Pilard (FRA)	Mitchel Schotman (NED)	Eddy Clerté (FRA)
Elite women	Zoé Claessens (SUI)	Manon Valentino (FRA)	Tessa Martinez (FRA)

=== 2022 ===
The 2022 European BMX Championships was held in Dessel, Belgium, between 8 and 10 July 2022.

Event	Gold	Silver	Bronze
Men
Elite men	Kye Whyte (GBR)	Cédric Butti (SUI)	Eddie Moore (GBR)
U23 men	Hugo Marszałek (FRA)	Tatyan Lui-Hin-Tsan (FRA)	Magnus Dyhre (DEN)
Junior men	Marcus Leth (DEN)	Mārtiņš Zadraks (LAT)	Andrea Fendoni (ITA)
Women
Elite women	Beth Shriever (GBR)	Elke Vanhoof (BEL)	Camille Maire (FRA)
U23 women	Malene Kejlstrup (DEN)	Thalya Burford (SUI)	Nadine Aeberhard (SUI)
Junior women	Renske van Santvoort (NED)	Emily Hutt (GBR)	Aiko Gommers (BEL)

=== 2023 ===
The 2023 European BMX Championships was held in Besançon, France, between 7–9 July 2023.

Event	Gold	Silver	Bronze
Men
Elite men	Niek Kimmann (NED)	Jérémy Rencurel (FRA)	Romain Racine (FRA)
U23 men	Mathis Jacquet (FRA)	Filib Steiner (SUI)	Matéo Colsenet (FRA)
Junior men	Edgars Langmanis (LAT)	Mika Lang (NED)	Baptiste Jupille (FRA)
Women
Elite women	Zoé Claessens (SUI)	Malene Kejlstrup (DEN)	Merel Smulders (NED)
U23 women	Nadine Aeberhard (SUI)	Tessa Martinez (FRA)	Michelle Wissing (NED)
Junior women	Laura Mougey (FRA)	Veronika Stūriška (LAT)	Betsy Bax (GBR)

=== 2024 ===
The 2024 European BMX Championships was held in Verona, Italy, between 29 May–2 June 2024.

Event	Gold	Silver	Bronze
Men
Elite men	Arthur Pilard (FRA)	Mathis Ragot Richard (FRA)	Cédric Butti (SUI)
U23 men	Alexis Pieczanowsky (FRA)	Tim Goossens (NED)	Jason Noordam (NED)
Junior men	Evan Oliviera (FRA)	Clément Rocherieux (FRA)	Mark Lüthi (SUI)
Women
Elite women	Zoé Claessens (SUI)	Laura Smulders (NED)	Nadine Aeberhard (SUI)
U23 women	Veronika Stūriška (LAT)	Emily Hutt (GBR)	Sabina Košárková (CZE)
Junior women	Anaïs Garnier (FRA)	Carla Gómez (ESP)	Méline Videlo (FRA)

=== 2025 ===
The 2025 European BMX Championships was held in Valmiera, Latvia, between 10–12 July 2025.

Event	Gold	Silver	Bronze
Men
Elite men	Mathis Ragot Richard (FRA)	Arthur Pilard (FRA)	Sylvain André (FRA)
U23 men	Jason Noordam (NED)	Casper Pipers (NED)	Edgars Langmanis (LAT)
Junior men	Kristers Apels (LAT)	Jesper Wahlberg (SWE)	Mark Lüthi (SUI)
Women
Elite women	Beth Shriever (GBR)	Merel Smulders (NED)	Laura Smulders (NED)
U23 women	Veronika Stūriška (LAT)	Michelle Wissing (NED)	Sabina Košárková (CZE)
Junior women	Freia Challis (GBR)	Elsa Rendall Todd (GBR)	Lola de Oliveira (FRA)

=== 2026 ===
The 2026 European BMX Championships was held in Sarrians, France, between 26–28 June 2026.

Event	Gold	Silver	Bronze
Men
Elite men	Mathis Ragot Richard (FRA)	Jérémy Rencurel (FRA)	Léo Garoyan (FRA)
U23 men	Mark Lüthi (SUI)	Alexandre Emmel (SUI)	Léo Le Bougeant (FRA)
Junior men	Marco Del Tongo (ITA)	Alex Chiandetti (ITA)	David Ferreira (SUI)
Women
Elite women	Laura Smulders (NED)	Zoé Claessens (SUI)	Axelle Étienne (FRA)
U23 women	Renske van Santvoort (NED)	Veronika Stūriška (LAT)	Laura Mougey (FRA)
Junior women	Elsa Rendall Todd (GBR)	Léonie Burgel (FRA)	Camille Brouchier (FRA)

== Medals ==
- Campeonato_Europeo_de_Ciclismo_BMX

== See also ==
- UCI BMX World Championships
