= Zoé Claessens =

Swiss cyclist (born 2001)

Zoe Claessens
Personal information
- Born: 28 April 2001 (age 25) Echichens, Switzerland

Cycling career
- Sport: Cycling
Medal record
Representing Switzerland
Women's BMX racing
| Event | 1st | 2nd | 3rd |
|---|---|---|---|
| Olympic Games | 0 | 0 | 1 |
| Youth Olympic Games | 0 | 1 | 0 |
| World Championships | 0 | 2 | 0 |
| World Junior Championships | 0 | 1 | 1 |
| World Cup | 0 | 1 | 0 |
| World Cup rounds | 5 | 5 | 4 |
| European Championships | 4 | 1 | 0 |
| European Junior Championships | 1 | 0 | 0 |
| Total | 10 | 11 | 6 |
Olympic Games
| Bronze medal – third place | 2024 Paris | BMX racing |
World Championships
| Silver medal – second place | 2022 Nantes | BMX racing |
| Silver medal – second place | 2024 Rock Hill | BMX racing |
World Cup
| Silver medal – second place | 2022 | BMX racing |
European Championships
| Gold medal – first place | 2021 Heusden-Zolder | BMX racing |
| Gold medal – first place | 2023 Besançon | BMX racing |
| Gold medal – first place | 2023 Besançon | BMX time trial (team) |
| Gold medal – first place | 2024 Verona | BMX racing |
| Silver medal – second place | 2026 Sarrians | BMX racing |
Youth Olympic Games
| Silver medal – second place | 2018 Buenos Aires | Mixed BMX racing |
World Junior Championships
| Silver medal – second place | 2018 Baku | BMX racing |
| Bronze medal – third place | 2019 Heusden-Zolder | BMX racing |
European Junior Championships
| Gold medal – first place | 2019 Valmiera | BMX racing |

Zoe Claessens (born 28 April 2001) is a Swiss BMX racing cyclist.

Claessens started racing BMX at age seven. Her father founded the Echichens BMX Club in Switzerland, and two of her brothers were also BMX racers. In 2018 she received the Female Young Talent award from the Swiss Sports Aid Foundation. She was selected in the Swiss team for the Cycling at the 2020 Summer Olympics – Women's BMX racing. Prior to that event in June 2021 she became the European Champion in Heusden-Zolder. She is coached by former World Champion and British Olympian Liam Phillips.

In 2022 she won silver at the UCI BMX World Championships. In October 2022 she finished runner-up at the UCI BMX Racing World Cup behind Laura Smulders and ahead of Olympic champion Beth Shriever.

She was a silver medalist at the 2024 UCI BMX World Championships in Rock Hill, South Carolina in June 2024.

Claessens won bronze at the 2024 Summer Olympics in Paris, becoming the first Swiss BMX racer to achieve this at the Olympics.
