= Cycling at the 2018 Summer Youth Olympics – Mixed BMX racing =

Mixed BMX racing at the III Summer Youth Olympic Games
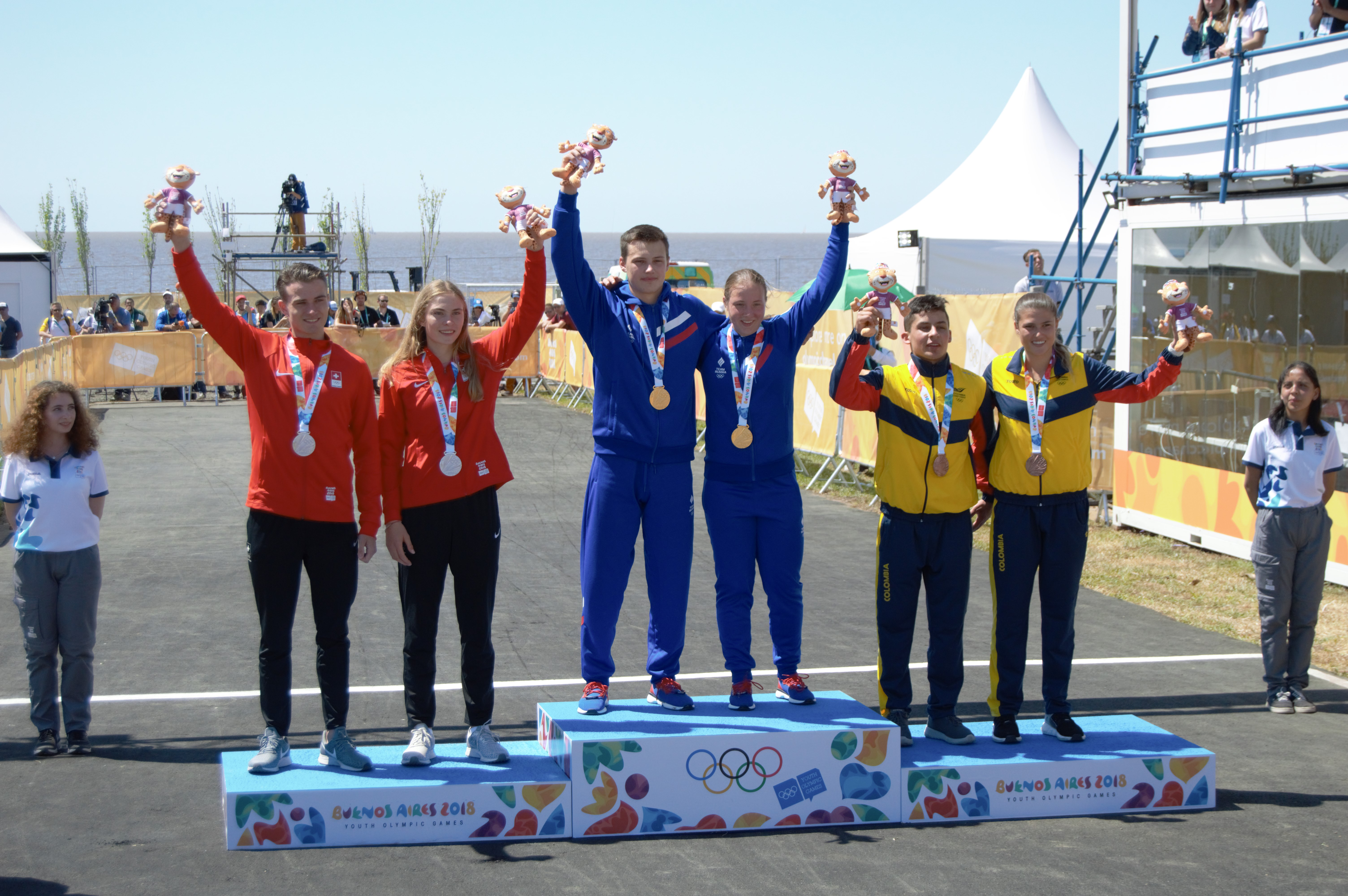
- Victory Ceremony of the Mixed BMX Racing event
- Venue: Paseo de la Costa, Vicente López
- Dates: 7 October
- Competitors: 32 from 16 nations

Medalists
1st place, gold medalist(s)		Varvara Ovchinnikova; Ilia Beskrovnyy	Russia
2nd place, silver medalist(s)		Zoé Claessens; Kevin Schunck	Switzerland
3rd place, bronze medalist(s)		Gabriela Bolle; Juan Ramírez	Colombia

These are the results for the mixed BMX racing event at the 2018 Summer Youth Olympics.

== Results ==
=== Boys ===
==== Semifinals ====
===== Heat 1 =====
Rank	Athlete	Run 1		Run 2		Run 3		Total
Rank	Athlete	Time	Pts	Time	Pts	Time	Pts	Total
1	Juan Ramírez (COL)	34.776	2	35.397	1	35.512	1	4
2	Edvards Glāzers (LAT)	34.497	1	35.728	2	36.791	5	8
3	Komet Sukprasert (THA)	35.152	3	36.456	4	35.607	2	9
4	Cailen Calkin (NZL)	35.981	4	35.840	3	35.726	3	10
5	Yuichi Masuda (JPN)	36.372	5	36.670	5	36.446	4	14
6	Patrik Nagy (SVK)	36.931	7	38.161	6	36.957	6	19
7	Joaquin Orellana (BOL)	38.293	8	39.058	7	38.039	7	22
8	Mauricio Molina (CHI)	36.540	6	1:43.812	8	DNS	10	24

===== Heat 2 =====
Rank	Athlete	Run 1		Run 2		Run 3		Total
Rank	Athlete	Time	Pts	Time	Pts	Time	Pts	Total
1	Ilia Beskrovnyy (RUS)	35.706	2	35.609	3	35.673	1	6
2	Efrain Chamorro (ECU)	35.484	1	35.109	1	36.686	5	7
3	Ross Cullen (GBR)	35.869	4	35.299	2	35.792	2	8
4	Kevin Schunck (SUI)	35.739	3	35.692	4	36.127	4	11
5	Lukáš Mentlík (CZE)	36.279	5	36.092	5	35.898	3	13
6	Aron Beck (GER)	36.808	6	37.655	7	36.774	6	19
7	Vitor Marotta (BRA)	37.303	7	37.705	8	37.813	7	22
8	Eduardo Vargas (MEX)	52.098	8	36.713	6	39.350	8	22

==== Final ====
Rank	Athlete	Time
1	Edvards Glāzers (LAT)	34.987
2	Ilia Beskrovnyy (RUS)	35.173
3	Efrain Chamorro (ECU)	35.729
4	Komet Sukprasert (THA)	35.793
5	Juan Ramírez (COL)	36.638
6	Cailen Calkin (NZL)	36.883
7	Ross Cullen (GBR)	36.947
8	Kevin Schunck (SUI)	37.454

=== Girls ===
==== Semifinals ====
===== Heat 1 =====
Rank	Athlete	Run 1		Run 2		Run 3		Total
Rank	Athlete	Time	Pts	Time	Pts	Time	Pts	Total
1	Jessie Smith (NZL)	38.555	1	39.639	2	38.358	1	4
2	Zoé Claessens (SUI)	38.735	2	39.291	1	38.773	2	5
3	Miru Nagare (JPN)	39.991	4	40.114	3	39.655	3	10
4	Maite Naves (BRA)	39.756	3	40.608	4	39.992	4	11
5	Elissa Bradford (GBR)	40.545	5	40.914	5	40.783	5	15
6	Sylvia Ochoa (ECU)	41.052	6	41.324	6	41.165	6	18
7	Panatda Buranaphawang (THA)	44.372	7	44.418	7	44.793	7	21
8	Radka Paulechová (SVK)	47.830	8	48.159	8	47.899	8	24

===== Heat 2 =====
Rank	Athlete	Run 1		Run 2		Run 3		Total
Rank	Athlete	Time	Pts	Time	Pts	Time	Pts	Total
1	Varvara Ovchinnikova (RUS)	40.100	3	39.580	1	39.955	1	5
2	Gabriela Bolle (COL)	39.716	1	40.194	2	40.508	3	6
3	Eliška Bartuňková (CZE)	39.958	2	40.521	3	40.490	2	7
4	Rocío Pizarro (CHI)	40.558	4	40.829	4	40.790	4	12
5	Dayana Hernández (MEX)	57.055	6	43.134	5	42.625	6	17
6	Julia Möhser (GER)	57.821	7	1:07.963	6	42.240	5	18
7	Regina Medina (BOL)	47.109	5	DNF	7	DNS	10	22
8	Airisa Galiņa (LAT)	DNF	8	DNS	10	DNS	10	28

==== Final ====
Rank	Athlete	Time
1	Zoé Claessens (SUI)	38.529
2	Varvara Ovchinnikova (RUS)	38.955
3	Gabriela Bolle (COL)	39.173
4	Jessie Smith (NZL)	39.362
5	Rocío Pizarro (CHI)	40.415
6	Miru Nagare (JPN)	40.489
7	Eliška Bartuňková (CZE)	40.591
8	Maite Naves (BRA)	41.482

=== Overall ===
Rank	Team	Athlete	Rank	Points	Total points
1st place, gold medalist(s)	Russia	Varvara Ovchinnikova	2	80	160
1st place, gold medalist(s)	Russia	Ilia Beskrovnyy	2	80	160
2nd place, silver medalist(s)	Switzerland	Zoé Claessens	1	100	120
2nd place, silver medalist(s)	Switzerland	Kevin Schunck	8	20	120
3rd place, bronze medalist(s)	Colombia	Gabriela Bolle	3	65	105
3rd place, bronze medalist(s)	Colombia	Juan Ramírez	5	40	105
4	Latvia	Airisa Galiņa	16	1	101
4	Latvia	Edvards Glāzers	1	100	101
5	New Zealand	Jessie Smith	4	50	80
5	New Zealand	Cailen Calkin	6	30	80
6	Ecuador	Sylvia Ochoa	11	8	73
6	Ecuador	Efrain Chamorro	3	65	73
7	Thailand	Panatda Buranaphawang	13	4	54
7	Thailand	Komet Sukprasert	4	50	54
8	Chile	Rocío Pizarro	5	40	41
8	Chile	Mauricio Molina	16	1	41
9	Japan	Miru Nagare	6	30	40
9	Japan	Yuichi Masuda	10	10	40
10	Great Britain	Elissa Bradford	9	15	40
10	Great Britain	Ross Cullen	7	25	40
10	Czech Republic	Eliška Bartuňková	7	25	40
10	Czech Republic	Lukáš Mentlík	9	15	40
12	Brazil	Maite Naves	8	20	24
12	Brazil	Vitor Marotta	13	4	24
13	Germany	Julia Möhser	12	6	14
13	Germany	Aron Beck	11	8	14
14	Mexico	Dayana Hernández	10	10	12
14	Mexico	Eduardo Vargas	15	2	12
15	Slovakia	Radka Paulechová	15	2	8
15	Slovakia	Patrik Nagy	12	6	8
16	Bolivia	Regina Medina	14	3	6
16	Bolivia	Joaquin Orellana	14	3	6
