= Cédric Butti =

Swiss BMX rider (born 1999)

Cedric Butti
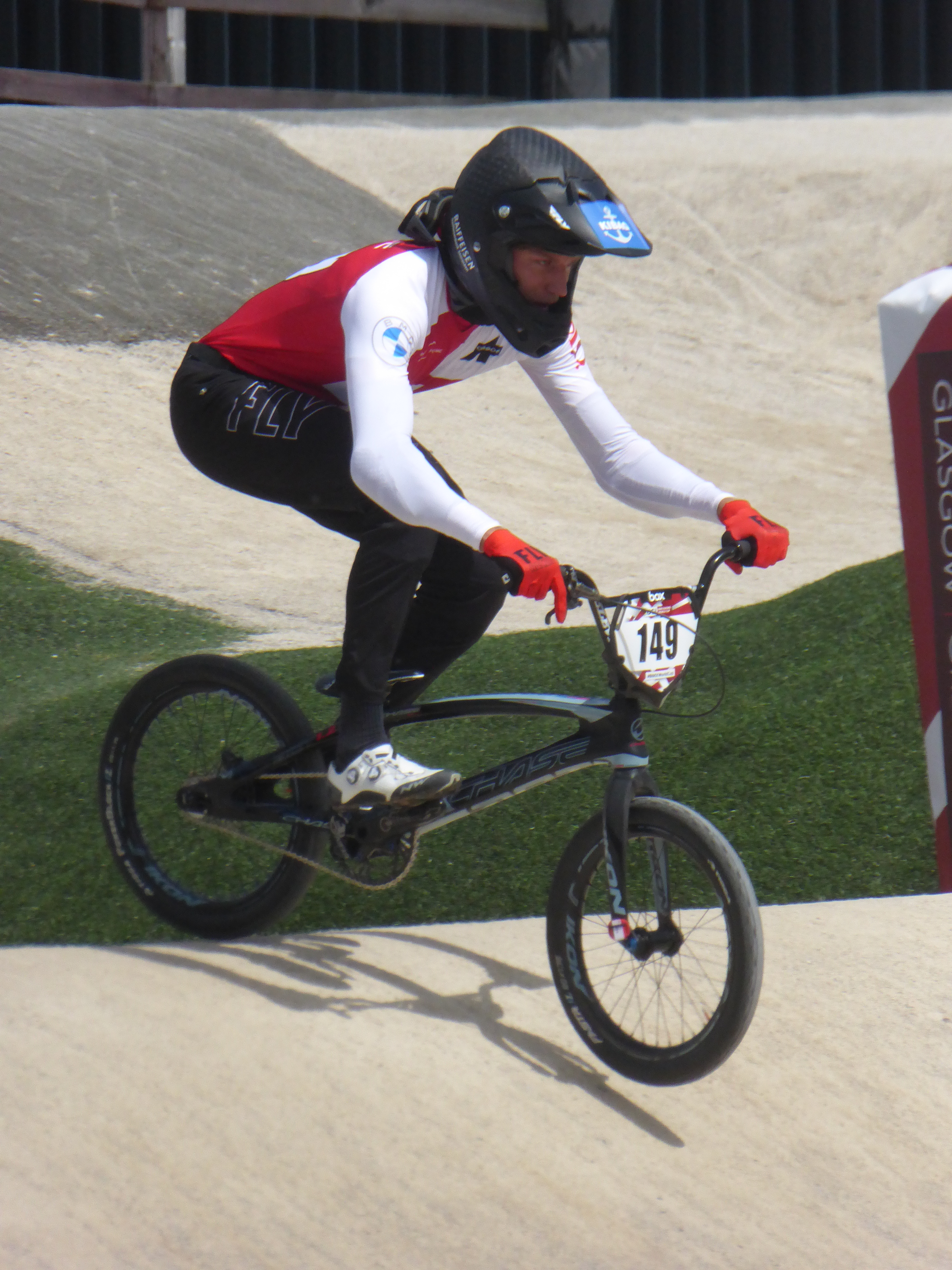
- Butti in 2022

Personal information
- Born: 23 July 2003 (age 23)

Cycling career
- Sport: Cycling
- Discipline: BMX racing
Medal record
Representing Switzerland
Men's BMX racing
World Cup
Silver medal – second place	2024	BMX racing
European Championships
Silver medal – second place	2022 Dessel	BMX racing
Bronze medal – third place	2024 Verona	BMX racing
European U23 Championships
Gold medal – first place	2021 Zolder	BMX racing

Cédric Butti (born 23 July 1999) is a Swiss BMX racer. He was a silver medalist at the 2024 UCI BMX Racing World Cup and selected for the 2024 Summer Olympics.

== Career ==
He won the European U23 title in 2021 in Zolder.

He became Swiss national champion for the first time in 2022. He was a silver medalist at the 2022 European BMX Championships in Dessel.

He was a bronze medalist at the European BMX Championships in Verona. He was a silver medalist at the 2024 UCI BMX Racing World Cup. He was selected for the 2024 Summer Olympics.

== Personal life ==
He is from Thurgau.
