= Ross Cullen (cyclist) =

British professional BMX racer

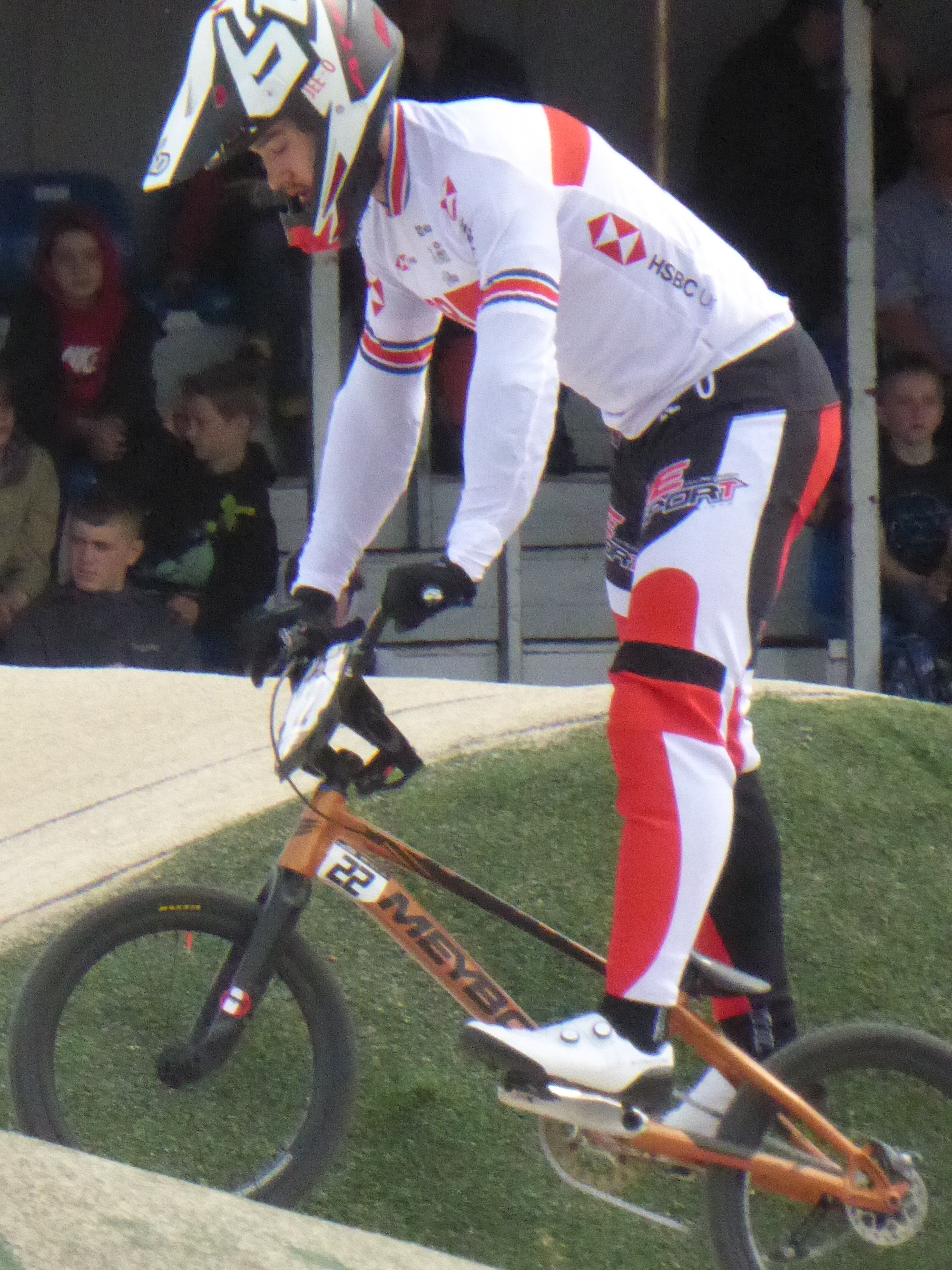
- Ross Cullen at 2022 UCI BMX Racing World Cup

Personal information
- Born: March 28, 2001 (age 25) Preston, England

Cycling career
- Sport: Cycling
- Discipline: BMX racing
- Role: Rider
- Rider type: Elite Men
Medal record
Representing Great Britain
Men's BMX racing
World Championships
Silver medal – second place	2026 Brisbane	BMX racing
European Junior Championships
Gold medal – first place	2019 Valmiera	BMX racing

Ross Cullen (born 28 March 2001) is a British BMX racing cyclist. The 2019 Junior European Champion and a former age-group junior World Champion, he has represented Great Britain at the senior level in multiple elite competitions and won the silver medal at the 2026 World Championships.

== Early and personal life ==
He is from Preston, Lancashire and is the son of parents Paul and Sally. He has an older sister, Ella. He started BMX racing at the age of six years-old at his local BMX Track in Preston and became a member of the Preston Pirates. He attended St Michael's C of E School in Chorley.

== Career ==
He finished fourth in his age-group at the 2011 Junior World Championships in Copenhagen, before winning his first junior title the following year in Birmingham. He later became part of British Cycling’s development programme. He won the junior world championships for a second time in Rotterdam in 2015.

He was chosen as flag bearer for the Great Britain team at the 2018 Youth Olympic Games in Argentina. In 2019, he won the British junior title in Glasgow and became the European junior champion at the European BMX Championships in Latvia, in consecutive weeks, before moving to the senior level the following year.

He was named as a travelling reserve behind eventual silver medalist Kye Whyte, for the British team at the delayed 2020 Olympic Games, held in 2021 in Tokyo. He was the victor at the 2022 National BMX Racing Series in Birmingham in August 2022. He raced in the elite men’s competition at the 2023 World Championships in Glasgow, Scotland.

He won his first senior medal with a silver in the Brisbane leg of the 2024 UCI BMX Racing World Cup. He was selected as part of the British men’s elite team for the 2024 UEC BMX Racing European Continental Championships and the 2024 World Championships, held in Rock Hill, South Carolina, in May 2024. He was named as a travelling reserve again behind Whyte at the 2024 Paris Olympic Games.

In June 2025, he recorded a win in the UCI BMX Racing World Cup in the Netherlands, finishing ahead of Cameron Wood of the United States by nearly five hundredths of a second.

In July 2026, Cullen won the silver medal at the 2026 UCI BMX Racing World Championships in Brisbane, Australia. He had recorded the second-fastest lap, behind Australia's Jesse Asmus, on the opening day. However, the event was curtailed by adverse weather causing all racing to be abandoned; having set the second overall fastest lap time, Cullen was awarded the silver medal.
