= 2024 European BMX Championships =

Bicycle race in 2024

The 2024 European BMX Championships consists of two separate championships: BMX racing and freestyle BMX.

- European BMX racing Championships was held in Verona, Italy from 29 May to 2 June.
- European Freestyle BMX Championships was held in Cadenazzo, Switzerland from 20 to 21 September.

== Medal summary ==
=== Racing ===
| Event | Gold | | Silver | | Bronze | |
Elite
| Men's Elite | Arthur Pilard; France | 34.825 | Mathis Ragot Richard; France | 34.849 (+0.024) | Cédric Butti; Switzerland | 35.362 (+0.537) |
| Women's Elite | Zoé Claessens; Switzerland | 34.926 | Laura Smulders; Netherlands | 35.430 (+0.504) | Nadine Aeberhard; Switzerland | 35.829 (+0.903) |
Age-grade
| Men's U23 | Alexis Pieczanowsky; France | 35.681 | Tim Goossens; Netherlands | 36.239 (+0.558) | Jason Noordam; Netherlands | 36.936 (+1.255) |
| Women's U23 | Veronika Stūriška; Latvia | 36.504 | Emily Hutt; Great Britain | 36.537 (+0.033) | Sabina Košárková; Czech Republic | 37.086 (+0.582) |
| Men's Junior | Evan Oliviera; France | 36.024 | Clément Rocherieux; France | 36.767 (+0.743) | Mark Lüthi; Switzerland | 36.989 (+0.965) |
| Women's Junior | Anaïs Garnier; France | 38.575 | Carla Gómez; Spain | 38.852 (+0.277) | Méline Videlo; France | 39.263 (+0.688) |
| Boy's U16 | Jesper Wahlberg; Sweden | 33.983 | Jeremy Plonjon; France | 35.092 (+1.109) | Jared Hill; Great Britain | 35.871 (+1.888) |
| Girl's U16 | Freia Challis; Great Britain | 36.462 | Elsa Rendall Todd; Great Britain | 36.898 (+0.436) | Camille Brouchier; France | 37.934 (+1.472) |
| Boy's U15 | Marco Del Tongo; Italy | 34.521 | Elias Hellebooge; Belgium | 34.599 (+0.078) | Ben Lüthi; Switzerland | 35.234 (+0.713) |
| Girl's U15 | Lieke van der Aa; Netherlands | 38.072 | Léonie Burgel; France | 38.384 (+0.312) | Carly Hayes; Ireland | 39.631 (+1.559) |

=== Freestyle ===
| Event | Gold | | Silver | | Bronze | |
|---|---|---|---|---|---|---|
| Men | Kieran Reilly; Great Britain | 93.23 | Anthony Jeanjean; France | 92.63 | Dylan Hessey; Great Britain | 91.33 |
| Women | Sasha Pardoe; Great Britain | 88.06 | Iveta Miculyčová; Czech Republic | 85.33 | Nikita Ducarroz; Switzerland | 83.16 |
