= Alina Beck =

German BMX racer (born 2006)

Personal information
- Born: 4 May 2006 (age 20) Garmisch-Partenkirchen, Germany

Cycling career
- Sport: Cycling
- Discipline: BMX racing

Alina Beck (born 4 May 2006) is a German BMX racer. She competed in the women's BMX racing event at the 2024 Summer Olympics.
