= 2024 UCI BMX World Championships =

- Location: Rock Hill, South Carolina, United States
- Dates: 17 to 18 May 2024

The 2024 UCI BMX World Championships was held from 17 to 18 May 2024 in Rock Hill, South Carolina.

== Medal summary ==
=== Elite events ===
Event	Gold		Silver		Bronze	
Men	Joris Daudet; France	32.735	Niek Kimmann; Netherlands	33.300	Sylvain André; France	33.864
Women	Alise Willoughby; United States	32.513	Zoé Claessens; Switzerland	32.886	Daleny Vaughn; United States	33.522

=== U23 events ===
Event	Gold		Silver		Bronze	
Men	Pedro Benalcazar; Ecuador	33.117	Patrick O'Brien; United States	33.568	Jason Noordam; Netherlands	33.674
Women	Veronika Stūriška; Latvia	33.173	Emily Hutt; Great Britain	33.393	Bella May; Australia	33.827

=== Junior events ===
Event	Gold		Silver		Bronze	
Men	Joshua Jolly; Australia	33.	Niels Appermont; Belgium	34.316	Valentino Vallejo; Argentina	40.177
Women	Teya Rufus; Australia	33.271	Lily Greenough; New Zealand	33.830	Ava Corley; United States	34.105

== Medal table ==
* Host nation (United States)

Rank	Nation	Gold	Silver	Bronze	Total
1	Australia (AUS)	2	0	1	3
2	United States (USA)*	1	1	2	4
3	France (FRA)	1	0	1	2
4	Ecuador (ECU)	1	0	0	1
4	Latvia (LAT)	1	0	0	1
6	Netherlands (NED)	0	1	1	2
7	Belgium (BEL)	0	1	0	1
7	Great Britain (GBR)	0	1	0	1
7	New Zealand (NZL)	0	1	0	1
7	Switzerland (SUI)	0	1	0	1
11	Argentina (ARG)	0	0	1	1
Totals (11 entries)		6	6	6	18
