= Gabriela Bolle =

Colombian BMX racer

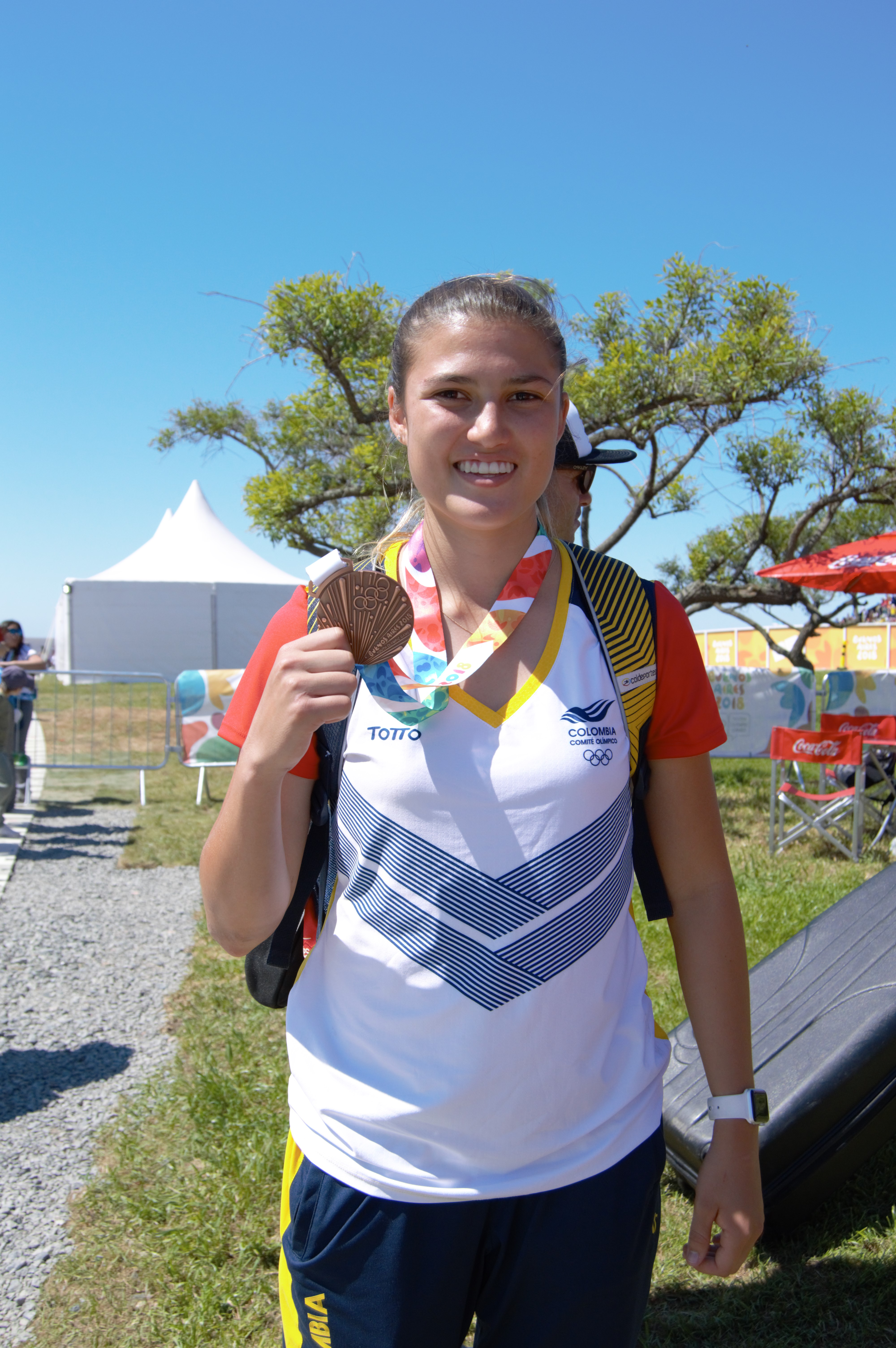
- Bolle in 2018

Personal information
- Born: 14 December 2000 (age 25) Florencia, Colombia

Cycling career
- Sport: Cycling
- Current team: Colombia
- Discipline: BMX racing
Medal record
Representing Colombia
Women's BMX racing
Event	1st	2nd	3rd
Youth Olympic Games	0	0	1
World Junior Championships	0	0	1
World Cup rounds	0	1	0
Pan American Games	0	0	1
Pan American Championships	0	1	0
CAC Games	1	1	0
South American Games	0	1	0
Pan American Junior Championships	0	1	1
Total	1	5	4
Pan American Games
Bronze medal – third place	2023 Santiago	BMX racing
Pan American Championships
Silver medal – second place	2026 Bogotá	BMX racing
Central American and Caribbean Games
Gold medal – first place	2018 Barranquilla	BMX racing
Silver medal – second place	2023 San Salvador	BMX racing
South American Games
Silver medal – second place	2022 Asunción	BMX racing
Youth Olympic Games
Bronze medal – third place	2018 Buenos Aires	Mixed BMX racing
World Junior Championships
Bronze medal – third place	2018 Baku	BMX racing
Pan American Junior Championships
Silver medal – second place	2018 Medellín	BMX racing
Bronze medal – third place	2017 Santiago del Estero	BMX racing

Gabriela Bolle Carrillo (born 14 December 2000) is a Colombian BMX racer. She competed in the women's BMX racing event at the 2024 Summer Olympics.
