= Kye Whyte =

British male BMX rider

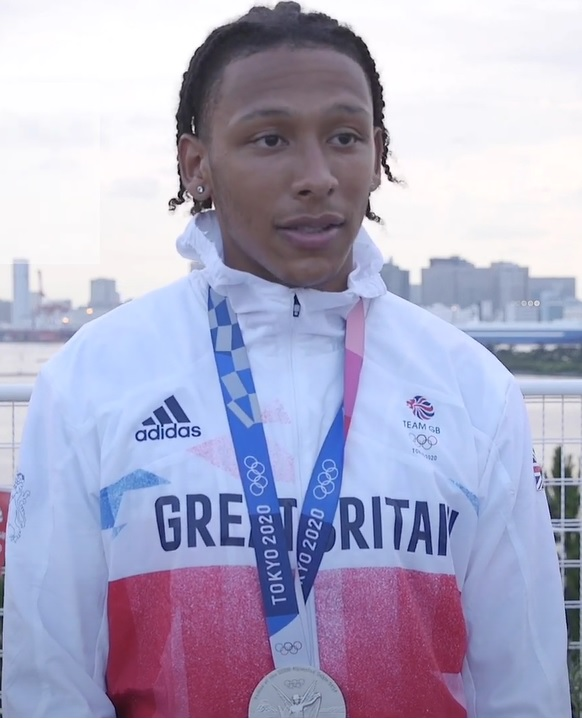
- Whyte in 2021

Personal information
- Born: 21 September 1999 (age 27) Peckham, Southwark, England

Cycling career
- Sport: Cycling
- Current team: Great Britain
- Discipline: BMX racing
- Role: Rider
Medal record
Representing Great Britain
Men's BMX racing
Olympic Games
Silver medal – second place	2020 Tokyo	BMX racing
World Championships
Silver medal – second place	2022 Nantes	BMX racing
European Championships
Gold medal – first place	2022 Dessel	BMX racing
Silver medal – second place	2018 Glasgow	BMX racing

Kye Whyte (born 21 September 1999) is a British male BMX racer. He was a silver medallist at the 2020 Summer Olympics. He competed in the fourteenth series of Dancing on Ice in 2022.

== Early life ==
Whyte started riding BMX at the age of three at Brixton BMX Club in Brockwell Park, south London. Later, alongside his brothers Daniel and Tre Whyte he attended Peckham BMX Club as a youngster. The club was co-founded by the brothers' father Nigel. Tre and Kye would both become members of the Great Britain Cycling Team, with Kye becoming the eighth member of the Peckham club to do so. Kye suffered a crash shortly after first joining the British Cycling talent group, spending five days in an induced coma and unable to ride for a year.

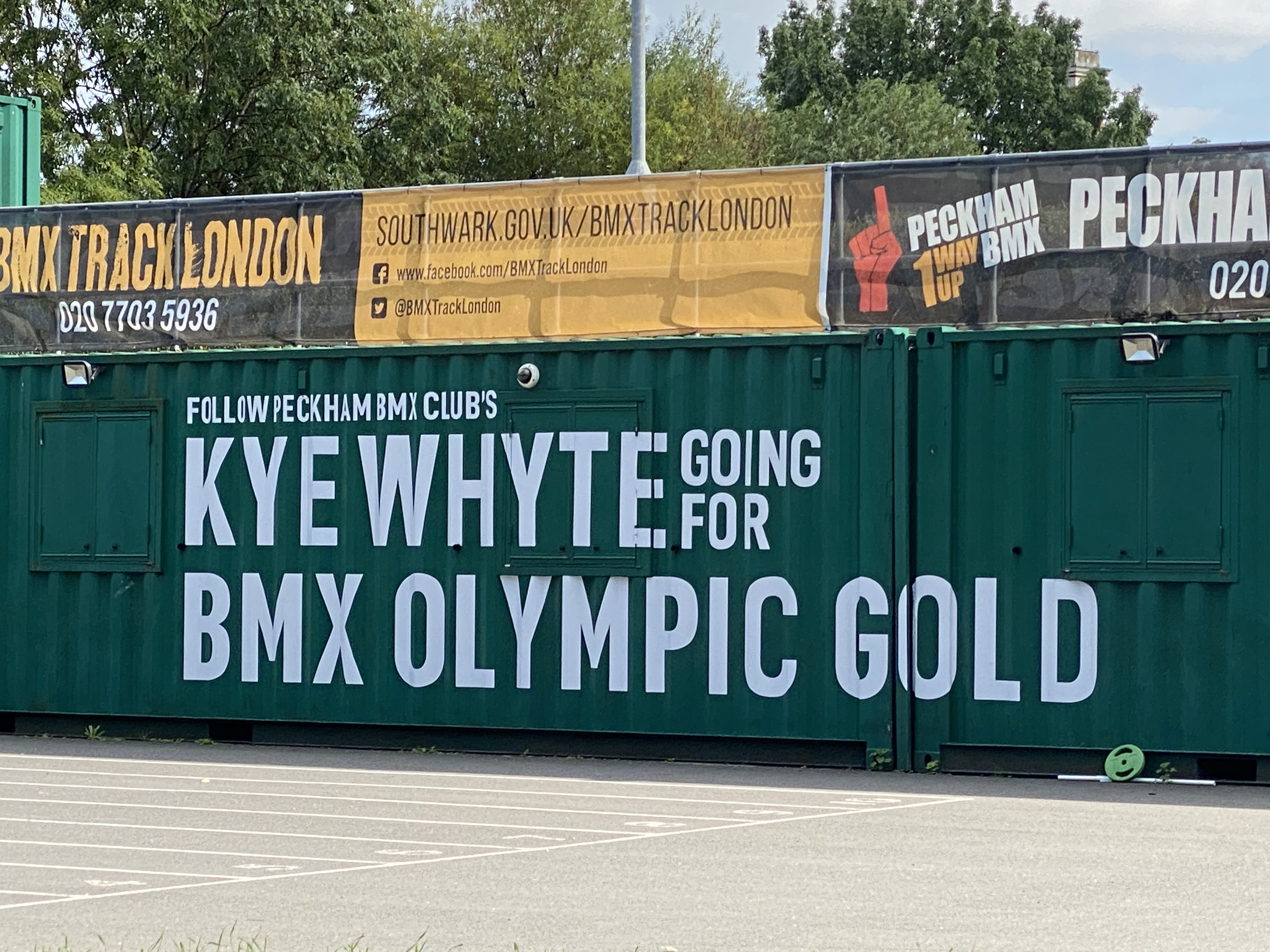
Sign on Peckham BMX track in Burgess Park supporting Kye in the 2020 Olympics

== Career ==
He won a European championship silver medal behind teammate Kyle Evans in Glasgow in 2018. A first UCI BMX Supercross World Cup victory came in Manchester in April 2019.

At the 2019 UCI BMX World Championships Whyte again looked to be continuing his form on his way to the final, but his hopes of a medal were ended as he was caught behind a crash, eventually finishing fifth.

On 20 June 2021, he was named in the British team for the delayed 2020 Tokyo Olympics, where he won a silver medal in a close contest with the Netherlands' Niek Kimmann.

At the 2024 Paris Olympics, Whyte crashed in the semi-finals.

Outside of BMX racing, he was announced to take part in the fourteenth series of Dancing on Ice.

== Major results ==
2018
2018 European Championships

2nd Men's BMX racing

2021
2020 Tokyo Olympic Games

2nd BMX racing

2022
2022 UCI BMX World Championships

2nd Men's BMX racing

2022 European BMX Championships

1st Men's BMX racing
