= 2018 UCI BMX World Championships =

- Venue: Baku, Azerbaijan
- Date(s): 5–9 June
- Stadium: BMX VeloPark
- Nations participating: 33
- Cyclists participating: 230
- Events: 4

The 2018 UCI BMX World Championships was the 23rd edition of the UCI BMX World Championships and took place at the BMX VeloPark in Baku, Azerbaijan from 5 to 9 June 2018.

Just as at the 2017 edition, four medal events were held.

== Medal summary ==
=== Elite events ===
Event	Gold		Silver		Bronze	
Men's race	Sylvain André; France	31.476	Joris Daudet; France	31.482	Anderson Ezequiel de Souza Filho; Brazil	32.602
Women's race	Laura Smulders; Netherlands	35.690	Merel Smulders; Netherlands	36.833	Judy Baauw; Netherlands	37.578

=== Junior events ===
Event	Gold		Silver		Bronze	
Men's race	Léo Garoyan; France	33.077	Juan Ramírez; Colombia	33.761	Mauricio Molina; Chile	34.130
Women's race	Indy Scheepers; Netherlands	38.038	Zoé Claessens; Switzerland	38.476	Gabriela Bolle; Colombia	39.018

== Medal table ==
* Host nation (Azerbaijan)

Rank	Nation	Gold	Silver	Bronze	Total
1	Netherlands (NED)	2	1	1	4
2	France (FRA)	2	1	0	3
3	Colombia (COL)	0	1	1	2
4	Switzerland (SUI)	0	1	0	1
5	Brazil (BRA)	0	0	1	1
5	Chile (CHI)	0	0	1	1
Totals (6 entries)		4	4	4	12
