= 2026 UCI BMX World Championships =

Cycling Championships held in Brisbane, Australia

- Venue: Brisbane SX International BMX Centre
- Location: Chandler, Queensland, Australia
- Dates: 17 to 25 July 2026

The 2026 UCI BMX World Championships were held from 17 to 25 July in Brisbane, Australia and crowned world champions in the cycling discipline of BMX racing. But due to persistent strong winds and the concern for the riders' safety, the finals on the second day of the event were cancelled, leaving the final rankings to the last round of the first day; Great Britain’s Bethany Shriever won her second consecutive and fourth overall world championship in the elite women’s category, whilst Australia’s Jesse Asmus won his first world championship in the elite men’s category.

== Medal Summary ==
(All timings and intervals are taken and derived from the official timings of the respective last rounds)

=== Elite Events ===
Event	Gold		Silver		Bronze	
Men	Jesse Asmus; Australia	33.386	Ross Cullen; Great Britain	33.695 (+0.309)	Mathis Ragot Richard; France	33.796 (+0.101)
Women	Beth Shriever; Great Britain	36.585	Saya Sakakibara; Australia	36.908 (+0.323)	Laura Smulders; Netherlands	37.030 (+0.122)

=== U23 Events ===
Event	Gold		Silver		Bronze	
Men	Joshua Jolly; Australia	33.681	Jesse de Veer; Netherlands	34.454 (+0.773)	Clément Rocherieux; France	34.509 (+0.055)
Women	Renske van Santvoort; Netherlands	37.963	Veronika Stūriška; Latvia	38.378 (+0.415)	Alexis Alden; United States	38.657 (+0.279)

=== Junior Events ===
Event	Gold		Silver		Bronze	
Men	Lucas Zhou; Canada	34.770	Cameron Gatt; Australia	34.788 (+0.018)	Tommy Bruney; United States	34.853 (+0.065)
Women	Freia Challis; Great Britain	37.208	Elsa Rendall Todd; Great Britain	37.928 (+0.720)	Isla Basa; Australia	38.589 (+0.661)

== Medal table ==
* Host nation (Australia)

Rank	Nation	Gold	Silver	Bronze	Total
1	Australia	2	2	1	5
1	Great Britain	2	2	1	5
3	Netherlands	1	1	1	3
4	Canada	1	0	0	1
5	United States	0	0	2	2
6	France	0	0	1	1
Totals (6 entries)		6	5	6	17
