= Tre Whyte =

British male former BMX rider (born 1993)

Personal information
- Born: 20 October 1993 (age 32) Peckham, Southwark, London

Cycling career
- Sport: Cycling
- Discipline: BMX racing
- Role: Rider

Major wins
- 2016 British National Champion
Medal record
Men's BMX Racing
Representing Great Britain
World Championships
Bronze medal – third place	2014 Rotterdam	Elite Men

Tre Whyte (born 20 October 1993) is a British male former BMX rider. In 2014 he claimed bronze in the 2014 UCI BMX World Championships after having to self-fund his attendance due to not being selected by the British Cycling World Championship team. He competed in the time trial event at the 2015 UCI BMX World Championships. He was not selected for the 2016 World Championships, despite being the British National Champion, and was unable to self-fund his attendance due to rule changes. He retired from competition in 2020. During his career he was supported by the Dame Kelly Holmes Trust. Following his retirement from BMX, Whyte took up scooter racing. His brother Kye Whyte also competes for Britain.
