= Vilma Rimšaitė =

Lithuanian BMX rider (born 1983)

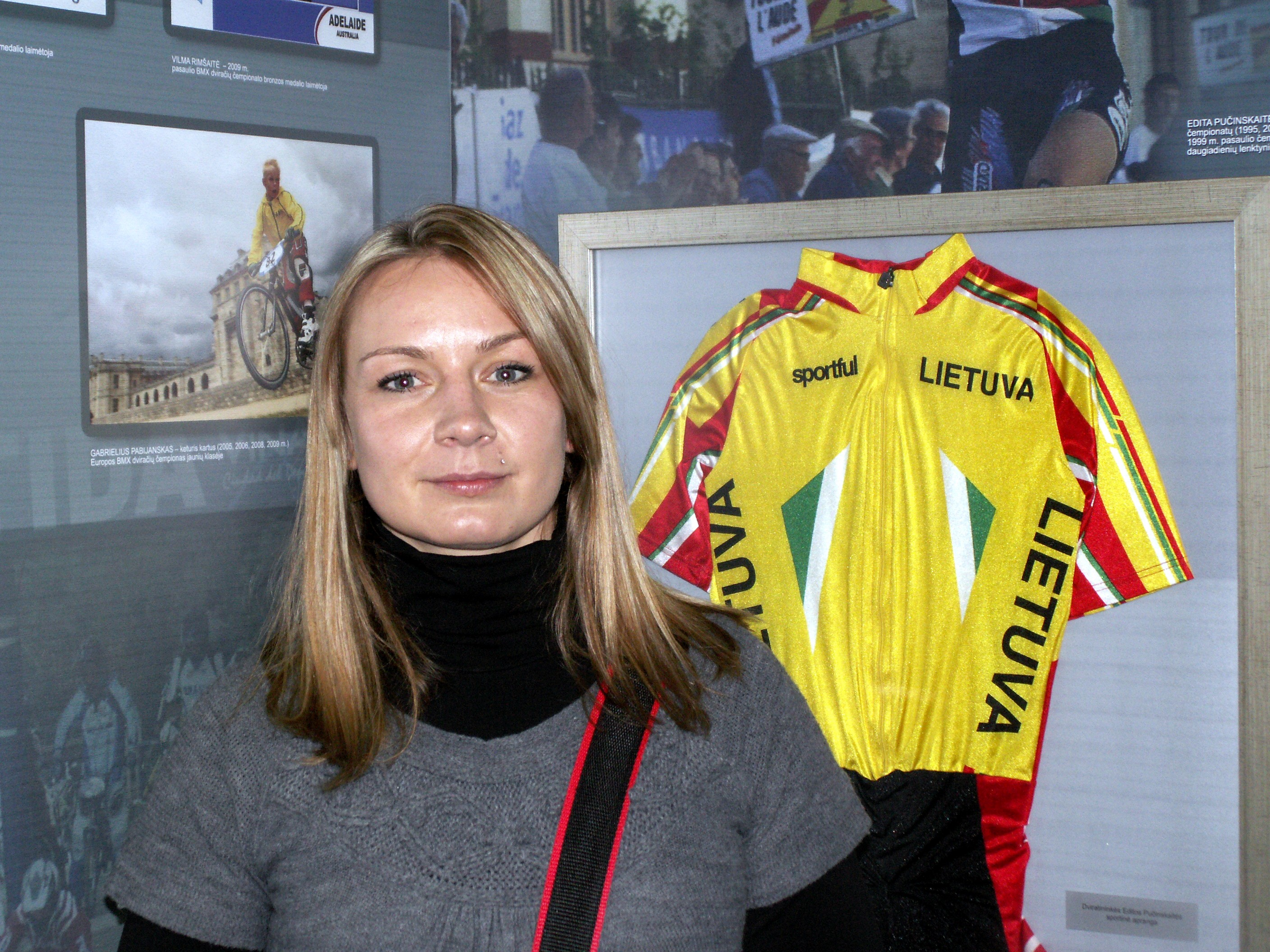

Personal information
- Full name: Vilma Rimšaitė
- Born: 24 February 1983 (age 43) Šiauliai, Lithuania

Cycling career
- Sport: Cycling
- Discipline: BMX
- Role: Racer
- Rider type: Off-road
Medal record
Representing Lithuania
Women's BMX racing
World Championships
| Bronze medal – third place | 2009 Adelaide | BMX cruiser |
| Bronze medal – third place | 2010 Pietermaritzburg | BMX cruiser |
European Championships
| Silver medal – second place | 2013 | BMX |
Summer Universiade
| Gold medal – first place | 2011 Shenzhen | BMX |

Vilma Rimšaitė (born 24 February 1983 in Šiauliai) is a Lithuanian BMX cyclist.

In the 2009 UCI BMX World Championships she won a bronze medal.

Rimšaitė was appointed as a member of the inaugural UCI Athletes' Commission in 2011.
