= 2022 UCI BMX World Championships =

- Location: Nantes, France
- Dates: 26 to 31 July 2022

The 2022 UCI BMX World Championships was held from 26 to 31 July 2022 in Nantes, France.

== Medal summary ==
=== Elite events ===
| Event | Gold | | Silver | | Bronze | |
|---|---|---|---|---|---|---|
| Men | Simon Marquart; Switzerland | 29.525 | Kye Whyte; Great Britain | 29.657 | Joris Daudet; France | 30.110 |
| Women | Felicia Stancil; United States | 33.144 | Zoé Claessens; Switzerland | 33.154 | Merel Smulders; Netherlands | 33.260 |

=== U23 events ===
| Event | Gold | | Silver | | Bronze | |
|---|---|---|---|---|---|---|
| Men | Léo Garoyan; France | 29.804 | Juan Ramírez; Colombia | 30.142 | Asuma Nakai; Japan | 30.320 |
| Women | Malene Kejlstrup; Denmark | 32.788 | Nadine Aeberhard; Switzerland | 33.280 | Molly Simpson; Canada | 33.598 |

=== Junior events ===
| Event | Gold | | Silver | | Bronze | |
|---|---|---|---|---|---|---|
| Men | Julian Bijsterbosch; Netherlands | 29.917 | Jaymio Brink; Netherlands | 30.295 | Wannes Magdelijns; Belgium | 30.330 |
| Women | Léa Brindjonc; France | 33.367 | Veronika Stūriška; Latvia | 33.537 | Sabina Košárková; Czech Republic | 34.248 |

== Medal table ==
* Host nation (France)

| Rank | Nation | Gold | Silver | Bronze | Total |
|---|---|---|---|---|---|
| 1 | France (FRA)* | 2 | 0 | 1 | 3 |
| 2 | Switzerland (SUI) | 1 | 2 | 0 | 3 |
| 3 | Netherlands (NED) | 1 | 1 | 1 | 3 |
| 4 | Denmark (DEN) | 1 | 0 | 0 | 1 |
| 4 | United States (USA) | 1 | 0 | 0 | 1 |
| 6 | Colombia (COL) | 0 | 1 | 0 | 1 |
| 6 | Great Britain (GBR) | 0 | 1 | 0 | 1 |
| 6 | Latvia (LAT) | 0 | 1 | 0 | 1 |
| 9 | Belgium (BEL) | 0 | 0 | 1 | 1 |
| 9 | Canada (CAN) | 0 | 0 | 1 | 1 |
| 9 | Czech Republic (CZE) | 0 | 0 | 1 | 1 |
| 9 | Japan (JPN) | 0 | 0 | 1 | 1 |
| Totals (12 entries) | | 6 | 6 | 6 | 18 |
