= Nadine Aeberhard =

Swiss BMX rider (born 2002)

Personal information
- Born: 28 May 2002 (age 24) Bern, Switzerland

Cycling career
- Sport: Cycling
- Discipline: BMX (bicycle motocross)
Medal record
Women's BMX racing
Representing Switzerland
European Championships
Bronze medal – third place	2024 Verona	BMX racing
World U23 Championships
Silver medal – second place	2022 Nantes	BMX racing
European U23 Championships
Gold medal – first place	2021 Zolder	BMX racing

Nadine Aeberhard (born 28 May 2002) is a Swiss BMX racer. She was a bronze medalist at the 2024 European BMX Championships and selected for the 2024 Paris Olympics.

== Career ==
She became European U23 champion in 2021 in Zolder. She was a silver medalist in the U23 race at the 2022 UCI BMX World Championships in Nantes.

She placed 2nd in the elite European Cup in Sarrians, France in March 2024. She was a bronze medalist at the 2024 European BMX Championships in Verona.

She was selected to represent Switzerland at the 2024 Summer Olympics.
