= Joris Daudet =

French racing cyclist (born 1991)

Joris Daudet CLH OLY
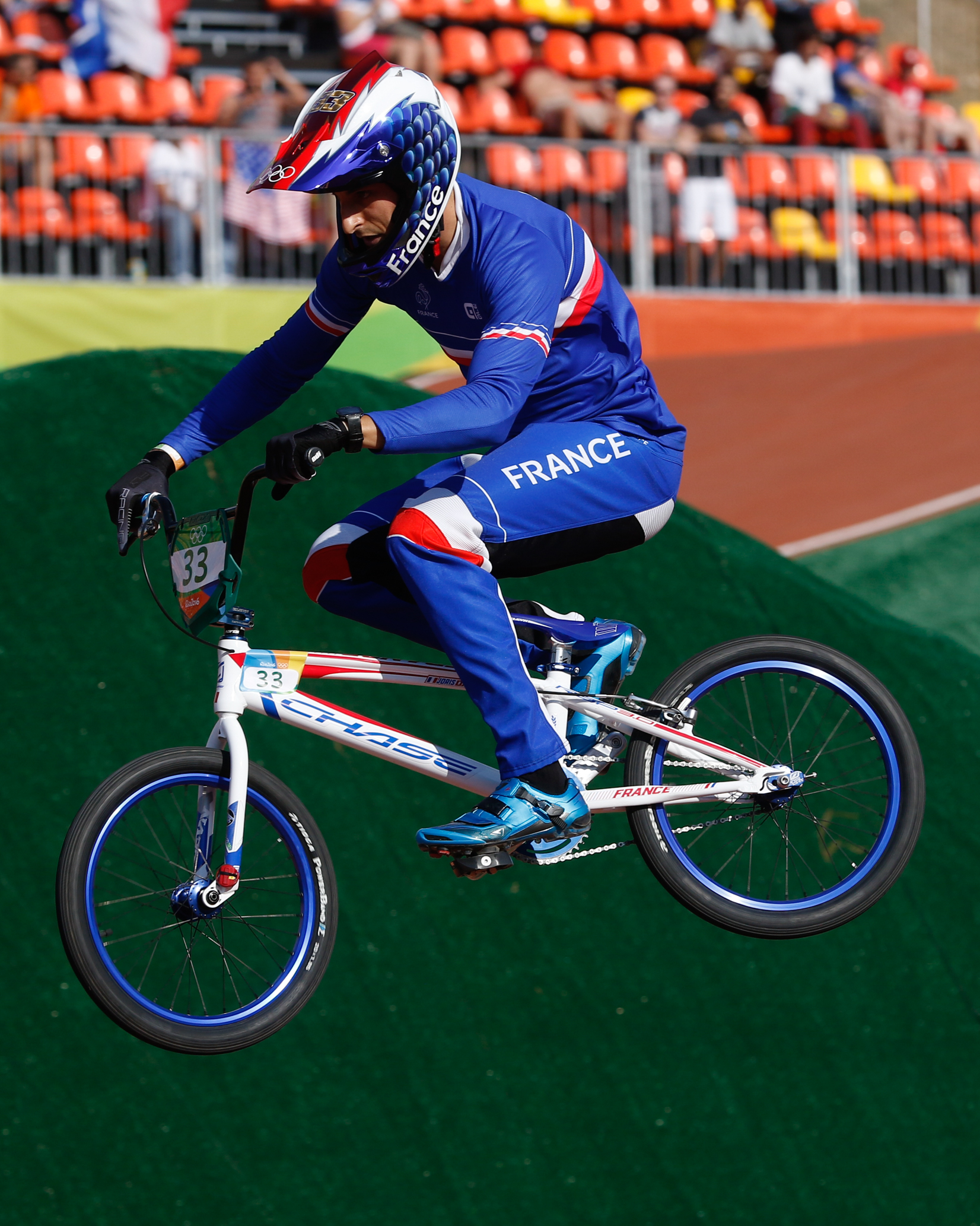
- Daudet at the 2016 Olympics

Personal information
- Born: 12 February 1991 (age 35) Saintes, France

Cycling career
- Sport: Cycling
- Current team: France
- Discipline: BMX racing
- Role: Rider
Medal record
Men's BMX racing
Representing (France) France
Event	1st	2nd	3rd
Olympic Games	1	0	0
World Championships	4	3	5
World Junior Championships	2	0	0
World Cup	1	2	1
European Games	1	0	0
European Championships	2	0	0
European Junior Championships	1	0	0
Total	12	5	6
Olympic Games
Gold medal – first place	2024 Paris	BMX racing
World Championships
Gold medal – first place	2011 Copenhagen	BMX racing
Gold medal – first place	2015 Heusden-Zolder	BMX time trial
Gold medal – first place	2016 Medellín	BMX racing
Gold medal – first place	2024 Rock Hill	BMX racing
Silver medal – second place	2012 Birmingham	BMX racing
Silver medal – second place	2013 Auckland	BMX time trial
Silver medal – second place	2018 Baku	BMX racing
Bronze medal – third place	2010 Pietermaritzburg	BMX racing
Bronze medal – third place	2014 Rotterdam	BMX time trial
Bronze medal – third place	2017 Rock Hill	BMX racing
Bronze medal – third place	2022 Nantes	BMX racing
Bronze medal – third place	2023 Glasgow	BMX racing
World Cup
Gold medal – first place	2011	BMX racing
Silver medal – second place	2018	BMX racing
Silver medal – second place	2023	BMX racing
Bronze medal – third place	2021	BMX racing
European Games
Gold medal – first place	2015 Baku	BMX racing
European Championships
Gold medal – first place	2011	BMX racing
Gold medal – first place	2017 Bordeaux	BMX racing
World Junior Championships
Gold medal – first place	2008 Taiyuan	BMX cruiser
Gold medal – first place	2009 Adelaide	BMX cruiser
European Junior Championships
Gold medal – first place	2008	BMX cruiser

Joris Daudet (French: [ʒɔʁis dodɛ]; born 12 February 1991) is a French racing cyclist, and World Champion who represents France in BMX. He achieved a gold medal at the 2024 Summer Olympics in the Men’s BMX racing event.

Born in Saintes, Daudet won all twelve events on the European BMX tour in 2011. That year, he also won the World Championship.

Daudet achieved second place in the time trial event at the 2013 BMX World Championship, and then regained the BMX World Championship in 2016. In 2017, he finished in third place, before finishing second in 2018.

Daudet was selected to represent France at the 2012 Summer Olympics in the men's BMX event. He also competed at the 2016 Olympics. He also competed in the 2015 European Games for France in the men's BMX. He earned a gold medal.

== Awards and honours ==
Orders

- Knight of the Legion of Honour: 2024
