= 2021 European BMX Championships =

2021 European Championships
- Location: Heusden-Zolder, Belgium
- Dates: 9 to 11 July 2021

The 2021 European BMX Championships will be held from 9 to 11 July 2021 in Heusden-Zolder, Belgium.

== Medal summary ==
| Event | Gold | Silver | Bronze |
|---|---|---|---|
| Men's | Arthur Pilard (FRA) | Mitchel Schotman (NED) | Eddy Clerté (FRA) |
| Women's | Zoé Claessens (SUI) | Manon Valentino (FRA) | Tessa Martinez (FRA) |
