= Judy Baauw =

Dutch bicycle motocross rider (born 1994)

Personal information
- Born: 12 February 1994 (age 32) Zoelmond, The Netherlands

Cycling career
- Sport: Cycling
Medal record
Representing Netherlands
Women's BMX racing
Event	1st	2nd	3rd
World Championships	0	1	2
World Cup	0	0	1
World Cup rounds	2	4	2
Total	2	5	5
World Championships
Silver medal – second place	2021 Arnhem	BMX racing
Bronze medal – third place	2018 Baku	BMX racing
Bronze medal – third place	2025 Copenhagen	BMX racing
World Cup
Bronze medal – third place	2018	BMX racing

Judy Baauw (born 12 February 1994) is a Dutch BMX rider. Her best achievements include winning a silver medal at the 2021 UCI BMX World Championships and bronze medals at the 2018 and 2025 UCI BMX World Championships.

== Career ==
Baauw achieved her first podium place in the World Cup circuit in Papendal in April 2017. A year later in 2018 she a successful season; placing third in the World Cup final standings, and third in the 2018 UCI BMX World Championships, behind the Dutch sisters laura and Merel Smulders. On 11 May 2019, Baauw recorded her first World Cup victory during the tournament at Papendal.

She finished ahead of Laura Smulders but behind 2020 Olympic Champion Bethany Shriever to win the silver medal at the 2021 UCI BMX World Championships.

In August 2025, she was a bronze medalist in Copenhagen, Denmark at the 2025 UCI BMX World Championships.
