= Quentin Caleyron =

French cyclist (born 1988)

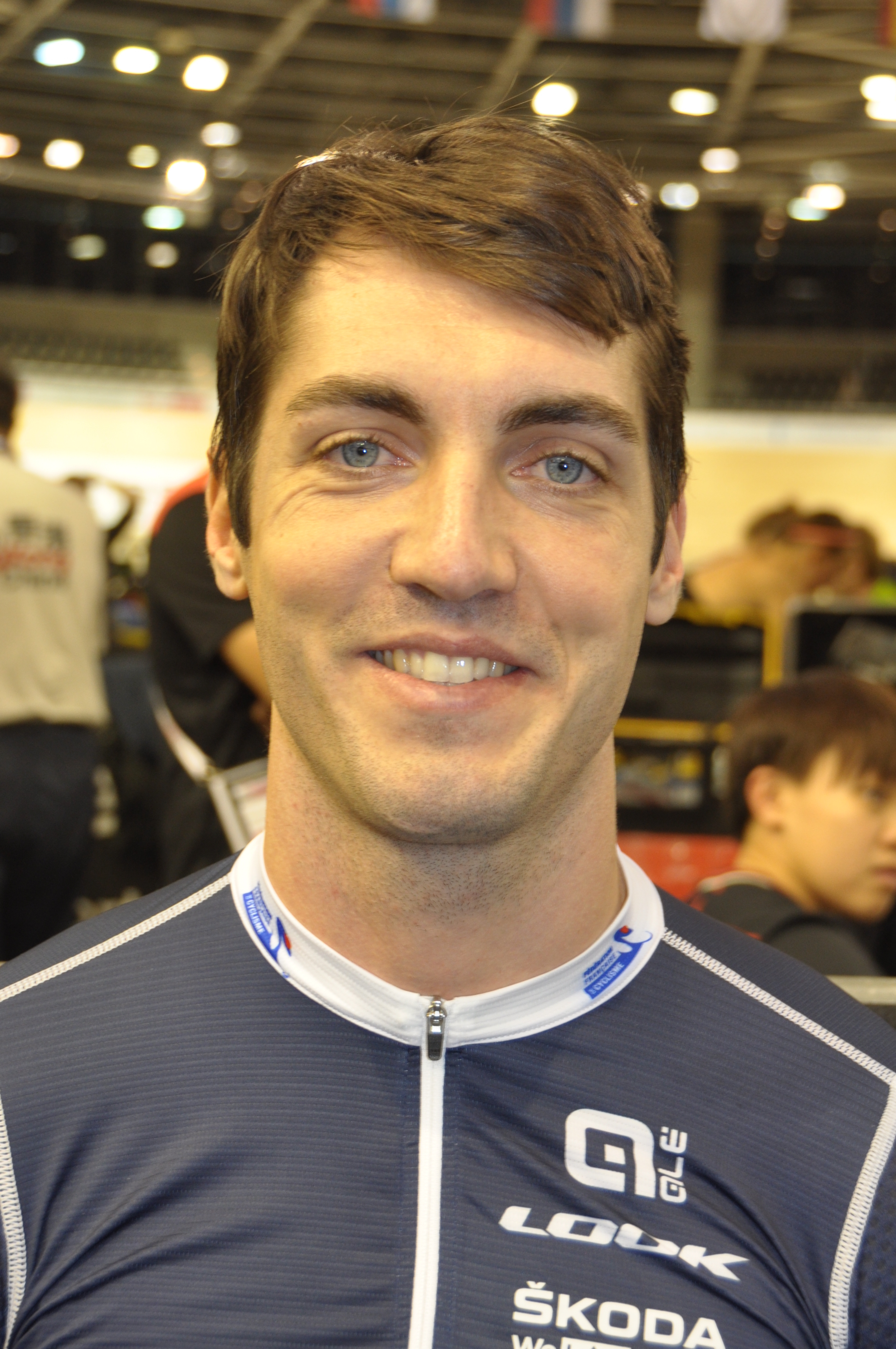
- Caleyron in 2018

Personal information
- Nationality: French
- Born: 30 January 1988 (age 38) Saint-Etienne, France
- Home town: Paris
- Height: 1.88 m (6 ft 2 in)
- Weight: 93 kg (14.6 st; 205 lb)
- Website: www.quentincaleyron.com

Sport
- Country: France
- Sport: Cycling
- Event(s): BMX racing, Track cycling
- Team: National French Team

Achievements and titles
- Olympic finals: London 2012
Medal record
Representing France
Men's track cycling
European Games
Silver medal – second place	2019 Minsk	Team sprint
Men's BMX racing
European Championships
Bronze medal – third place	2013	BMX
Bronze medal – third place	2015	BMX
World championships
Bronze medal – third place	2023	Paracycling Track

Quentin Caleyron (born 30 January 1988) is a French racing cyclist who represents France in BMX and track cycling. He represented France at the 2012 Summer Olympics in the men's BMX event, finishing 12th.

He turned to track cycling in 2018 and disputed his first World cup in Berlin at the end of 2018.

== Major results ==
=== BMX ===
- London Olympic Games : 12th
- European championships
  - Bronze 2013
  - Bronze 2015
