= Merel Smulders =

Dutch bicycle motocross rider (born 1998)

Personal information
- Born: 23 January 1998 (age 28)

Cycling career
- Sport: Cycling
- Discipline: BMX racing
Medal record
Representing Netherlands
Women's BMX racing
Event	1st	2nd	3rd
Olympic Games	0	0	1
World Championships	0	1	1
World Junior Championships	1	0	0
World Cup rounds	0	3	2
European Championships	1	1	2
European Junior Championships	1	0	0
Total	3	5	6
Olympic Games
Bronze medal – third place	2020 Tokyo	BMX racing
World Championships
Silver medal – second place	2018 Baku	BMX racing
Bronze medal – third place	2022 Nantes	BMX racing
World Junior Championships
Gold medal – first place	2016 Medellín	BMX time trial
European Championships
Gold medal – first place	2016 Verona	BMX time trial
Silver medal – second place	2025 Valmiera	BMX racing
Bronze medal – third place	2023 Besançon	BMX racing
Bronze medal – third place	2023 Besançon	BMX time trial (team)
European Junior Championships
Gold medal – first place	2016 Verona	BMX racing

Merel Smulders (born 23 January 1998 in Horssen) is a Dutch BMX racing rider.

== Career ==
Smulders was the silver medal winner at the 2018 UCI BMX World Championships behind her sister Laura Smulders. Prior to this, she became junior World Time Trial Champion at the 2016 UCI BMX World Championships. At the 2020 Summer Games BMX Race, she won the bronze medal.

Smulders was selected for the 2024 Paris Olympics.

Smulders won the silver medal at the 2025 European BMX Championships in Valmiera, Latvia behind Beth Shriever but ahead of her sister Laura in bronze.

== Personal life ==
Smulders is the younger sister of Laura Smulders, who won bronze in BMX at the 2012 Olympics.
