= Drew Mechielsen =

Canadian BMX cyclist

Personal information
- Born: August 19, 1997 (age 29) Surrey, British Columbia, Canada
- Height: 165 cm (5 ft 5 in)
- Weight: 63 kg (139 lb)

Cycling career
- Sport: Cycling
- Discipline: Women's BMX racing

Drew Mechielsen (born August 19, 1997) is a Canadian cyclist in the BMX discipline.

== Career ==
In 2018, Mechielsen had four top ten finishes during the World Cup circuit. Mechielsen has competed at three World Championships in 2017, 2018 and 2019, finishing 27th, 34th and 37th respectively. In 2019, Mechielsen competed at the 2019 Pan American Games, finishing in seventh place.

In July 2021, Mechielsen was named to Canada's 2020 Olympic team.
