= Rihards Veide =

Latvian BMX racer

Personal information
- Nationality: Latvian
- Born: 1 November 1991 (age 33); Valmiera, Latvia
- Height: 1.82 m (6 ft 0 in)
- Weight: 77 kg (170 lb)

Sport
- Country: Latvia
- Sport: BMX racing

Rihards Veide (born 1 November 1991) is a Latvian BMX racer. He qualified for the 2012 Summer Olympics in London, finishing in 7th place in the final. Veide has won the bronze medal at 2011 European Championships. He was born in Valmiera, Latvia.
