= Vineta Pētersone =

Latvian skier and cyclist (born 1999)

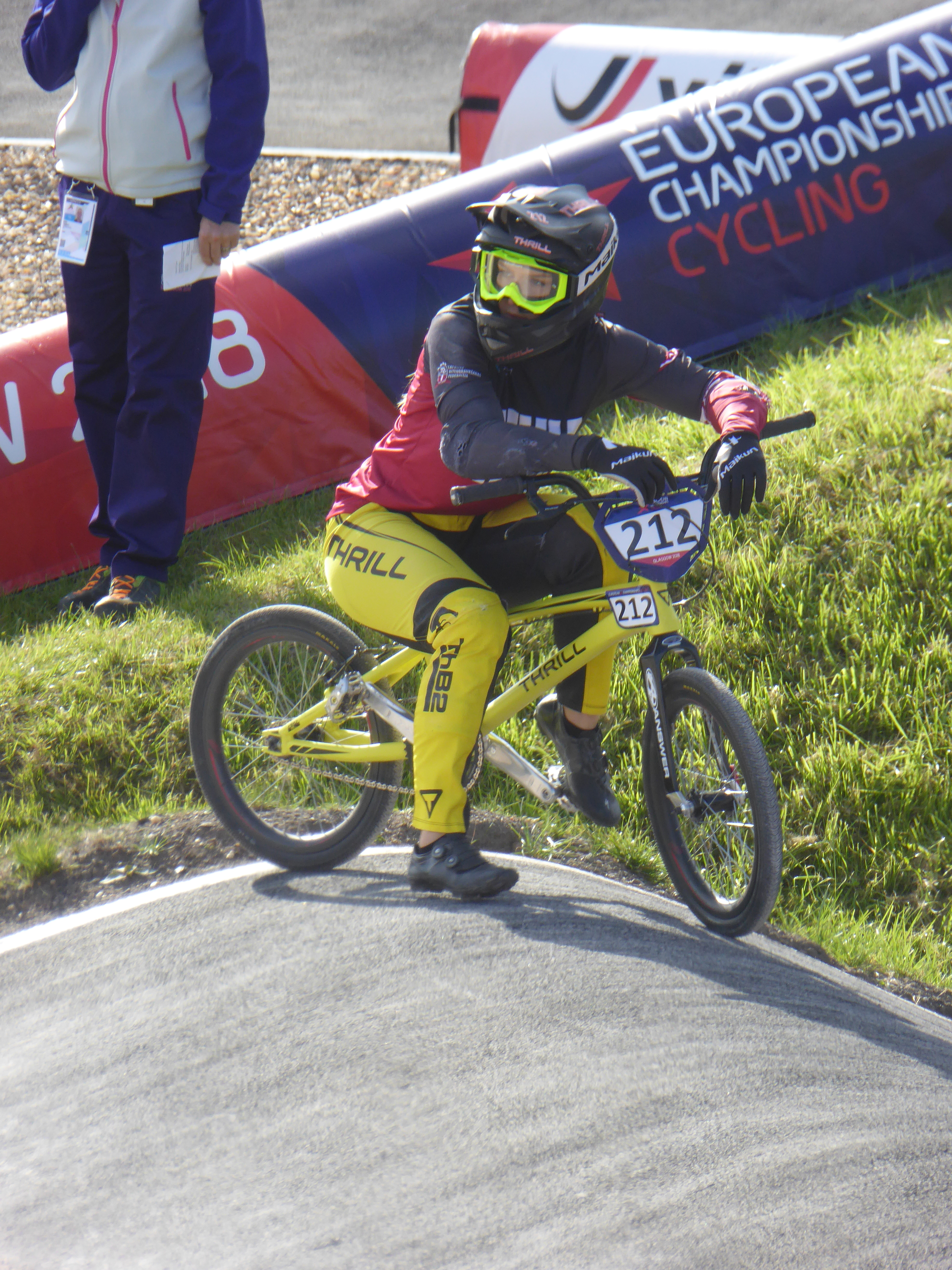

Personal information
- Born: 21 May 1999 (age 27) Cēsis, Latvia
- Height: 163 cm (5 ft 4 in)

Cycling career
- Sport: Cycling
- Discipline: BMX racing

Vineta Pētersone (born 21 May 1999) is a Latvian BMX cyclist. She competed at the 2020 Summer Olympics. She won the bronze medal at the 2024 UCI Pump Track World Championships.

== Early and personal life ==
She is from Cēsis in the Vidzeme region of Latvia. She competed in cross-country skiing at a national level as well as at the junior international level. Her older brother Arnis Petersons has competed in cross-country mountain biking at the World Championships, and also represented Latvia in biathlon at the 2012 Winter Youth Olympic Games in Innsbruck, Austria.

== Career ==
She is coached by Ģirts Kātiņš and is a member of Silvas Ziķeru in Silva, Latvia. In July 2017, she finished as runner-up at the European junior women's BMX championships in Bordeaux, France.

Pētersone reached the quarter-finals of the first stage of the World Cup Supercross in Australia in February 2020. In May 2021, she reached the semi-finals of the World Cup in Bogotá, Colombia, and finished eleventh overall. In mid-July she finished seventh at the 2021 European U-23 Championship. She was selected in the Latvian team for the women's BMX race at the delayed 2020 Olympic Games in Tokyo, Japan in 2021, but did not progress past the heats. In the lead up to the 2021 UCI Pump Track World Championships she won competitions in the discipline in Portugal, Sweden and Germany.

Pētersone reached the semi-finals of the BMX World Championships in Nantes in July 2022. In February 2023, she suffered a broken collar bone whilst competing in the United States.

In November 2024, she was selected to represent Latvia at the UCI Pump Track World Championships in the South African city of KwaMashu, winning the bronze medal at the event.
