= Malene Kejlstrup =

Danish BMX rider (born 2002)

Malene Kejlstrup Sørenson
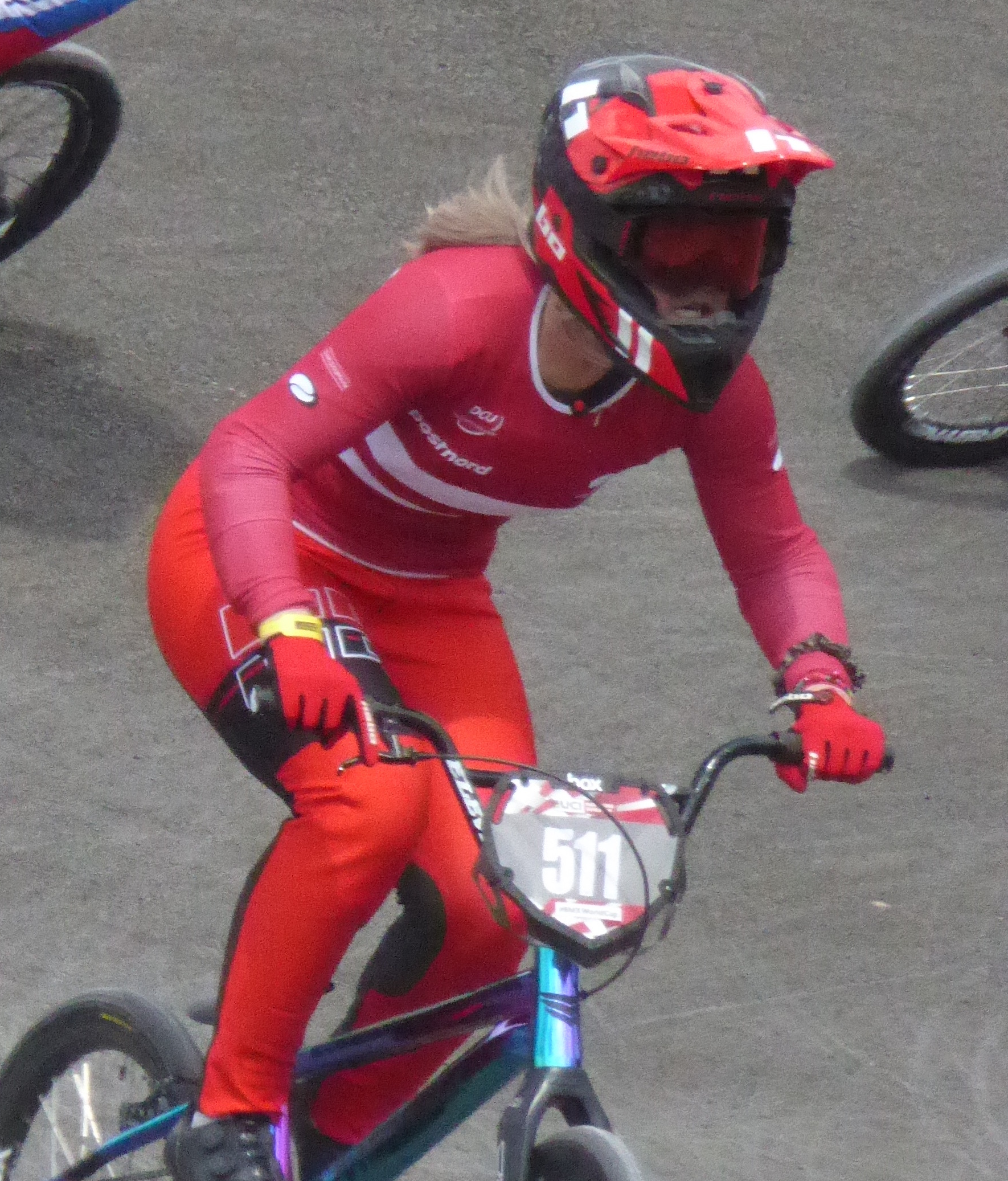
- Malene Kejlstrup (Denmark) during heat 1 of the quarter-finals of the women's under-23 event at Round 1 of the 2022 UCI BMX Racing World Cup in Glasgow.

Personal information
- Born: 6 June 2002 (age 24) Randers

Cycling career
- Sport: Cycling
- Discipline: BMX racing
Medal record
Representing Denmark
Women's BMX racing
European Championships
Silver medal – second place	2023 Besançon	BMX racing
World U23 Championships
Gold medal – first place	2022 Nantes	BMX racing
European U23 Championships
Gold medal – first place	2022 Dessel	BMX racing

Malene Kejlstrup Sørenson (born 6 June 2002) is a Danish BMX rider. She was a European Championship silver medalist in 2023, and was selected for the 2024 Summer Olympics.

== Early life ==
Her father was a BMX rider and she started in 2012 after he took her and her brother along to a track. She studied for her Higher Preparatory Examination (HF) with a mixture of remote learning and classroom learning so she could compete internationally.

== Career ==
=== 2022 ===
She became European U23 champion in Dessel in July 2022 at the 2022 European BMX Championships. The following week, she became U23 world champion at the 2022 UCI BMX World Championships in Nantes. In September 2022, she broke both elbows after a crash during training, and was out of action for a few months due to the subsequent operation. In December 2022, she was given Denmarks oldest sport award.

=== 2023 ===
She made the step-up to elite racing in 2023. She was a silver medalist in the elite women's race at the 2023 European BMX Championships in Besançon, France. She competed at the 2023 World Championships in Glasgow, Scotland, but crashed out at the quarter final stage.

=== 2024 ===
She was selected to represent Denmark at the 2024 Summer Olympics in Paris.
