= Messigny-et-Vantoux =

- Commune
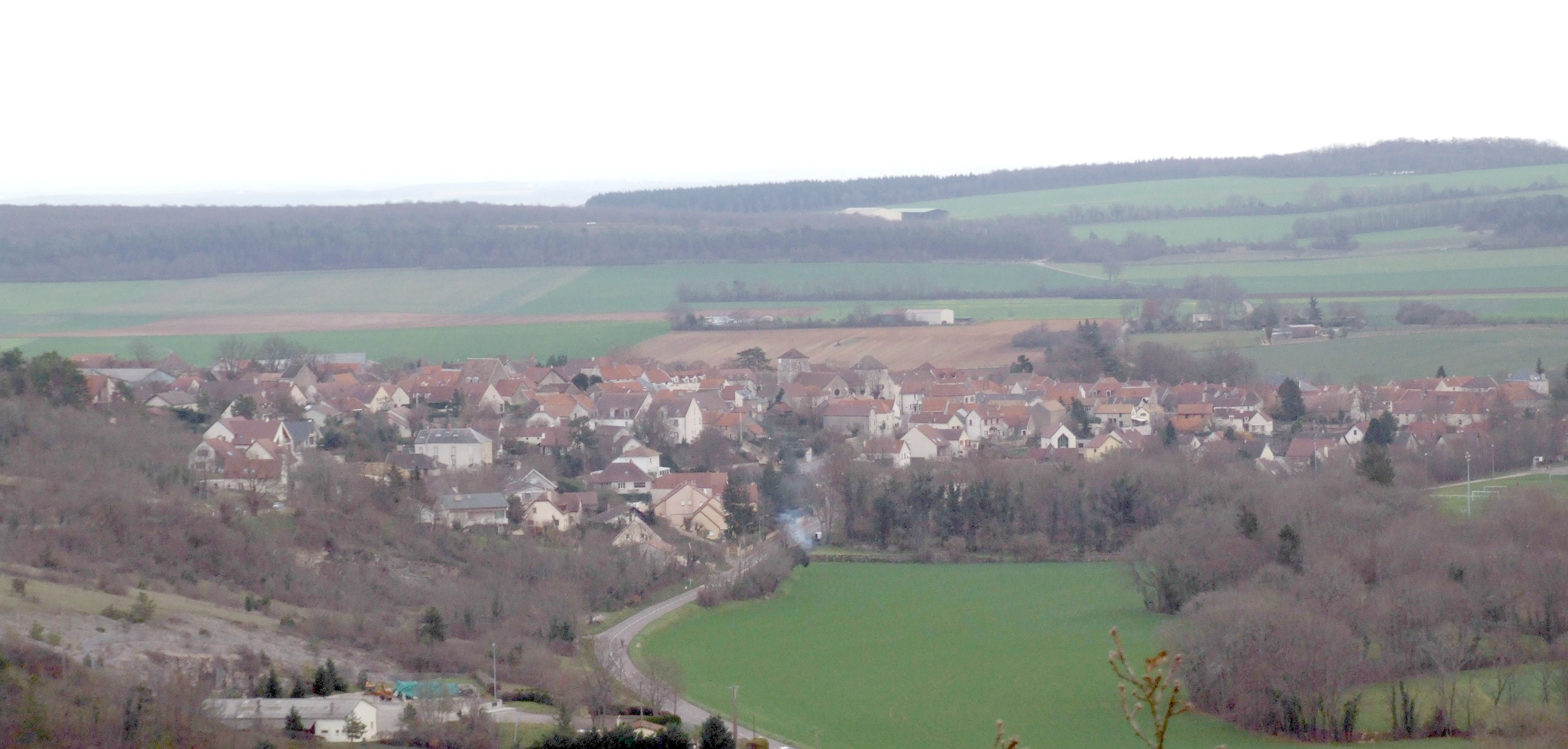
- A general view of Messigny-et-Vantoux

- Coat of arms
- Location of Messigny-et-Vantoux
- Location within France Location within Bourgogne-Franche-Comté
- Coordinates: 47°24′24″N 5°01′05″E
- Country: France
- Region: Bourgogne-Franche-Comté
- Department: Côte-d'Or
- Arrondissement: Dijon
- Canton: Fontaine-lès-Dijon

Government
  - Mayor (2020–2026): Françoise Gay
- Area^{1}: 33.92 km^{2} (13.10 sq mi)
- Elevation: 310 m (1,020 ft)
- Highest elevation: 553 m (1,814 ft)
- Lowest elevation: 274 m (899 ft)
- Population (2023): 1,720
  - Density: 50.7/km^{2} (131/sq mi)
- Time zone: UTC+01:00 (CET)
  - Summer (DST): UTC+02:00 (CEST)
- INSEE/Postal code: 21408 /21380
- ^{1} French Land Register data, which excludes lakes, ponds, glaciers > 1 km^{2} (0.386 sq mi or 247 acres) and river estuaries.

Messigny-et-Vantoux (French pronunciation: [mesiɲi e vɑ̃tu]) is a commune in the Côte-d'Or department in eastern France. It was created in 1973 by the merger of two former communes: Messigny and Vantoux-lès-Dijon.

== Population ==
Historical population
Year	Pop.	±% p.a.
1968	630	—
1975	767	+2.85%
1982	924	+2.70%
1990	1,070	+1.85%
1999	1,254	+1.78%
2007	1,477	+2.07%
2012	1,552	+1.00%
2017	1,660	+1.35%
2023	1,720	+0.59%
Source: INSEE

== See also ==
- Communes of the Côte-d'Or department
