= Veronika Stūriška =

Latvian BMX rider (born 2005)

Veronika Sturiška
Personal information
- Full name: Veronika Monika Sturiška
- Born: 28 December 2005 (age 20) Jaunpiebalga, Latvia

Cycling career
- Sport: Cycling
- Discipline: BMX racing
Medal record
Representing Latvia
Women's BMX racing
World U23 Championships
Gold medal – first place	2024 Rock Hill	BMX racing
Silver medal – second place	2026 Brisbane	BMX racing
World Junior Championships
Gold medal – first place	2023 Glasgow	BMX racing
Silver medal – second place	2022 Nantes	BMX racing
World Cup (U23)
Gold medal – first place	2022	BMX racing
Silver medal – second place	2023	BMX racing
Bronze medal – third place	2024	BMX racing
European U23 Championships
Gold medal – first place	2024 Verona	BMX racing
Gold medal – first place	2025 Valmiera	BMX racing
Silver medal – second place	2026 Sarrians	BMX racing

Veronika Monika Sturiška (born 28 December 2005) is a Latvian BMX racer. She was selected to compete at the 2024 Summer Olympics where she was Latvia's youngest competitor at the Games. She won the Junior title at the 2023 UCI Cycling World Championships and the 2024 World U23 Championships.

== Career ==
In October 2022, she won the overall standings of the BMX World Cup season in the U23 age group. That year, she won a silver medal at the World Junior Championship in Nantes, France. In December 2022 she was given the cyclist of the year award in Latvia by the Latvian Cycling Federation.

In August 2023, she won the Junior title at the 2023 UCI Cycling World Championships in Glasgow, Scotland.

In May 2024, she won the gold medal in the United States in the women's U23 group at the UCI BMX World Championships in Rock Hill, South Carolina. Shortly afterwards, she won the U23 title at the European BMX Championships.

She was the youngest competitor chosen by Latvia to compete at the 2024 Olympic Games in Paris, France. Stūriška finished her first run in seventh place with a time of 37.206 seconds. In her second run, Stūriška placed sixth in a field of eight riders with a time of 37.007 seconds. After two races she was in 19th position overall. In the third run, Stūriška was again sixth in a field of eight riders with a time of 37.12 seconds, but had moved to 18th place overall, which was enough for Stūriška to avoid the cut and qualify for the repechage round on her Olympic debut.

== Personal life ==
She is from the village of Jaunpiebalga in the Vidzeme region of Latvia.
