= Beth Shriever =

British BMX rider (born 1999)

Beth Shriever MBE
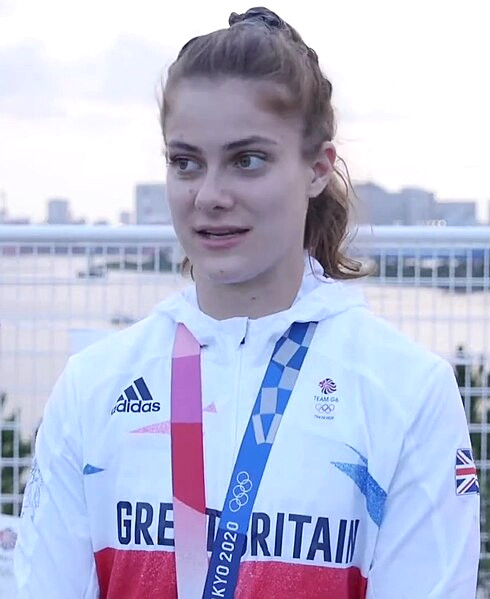
- Shriever in 2021

Personal information
- Full name: Bethany Kate Shriever
- Born: 19 April 1999 (age 27) Leytonstone, England

Cycling career
- Sport: Cycling
Medal record
Representing Great Britain
Women's BMX racing
Event	1st	2nd	3rd
Olympic Games	1	0	0
World Championships	4	0	0
World Junior Championships	1	1	0
World Cup	0	1	1
World Cup rounds	7	4	3
European Championships	2	1	0
Total	15	7	4
Olympic Games
Gold medal – first place	2020 Tokyo	BMX racing
World Championships
Gold medal – first place	2021 Arnhem	BMX racing
Gold medal – first place	2023 Glasgow	BMX racing
Gold medal – first place	2025 Copenhagen	BMX racing
Gold medal – first place	2026 Brisbane	BMX racing
World Cup
Silver medal – second place	2023	BMX racing
Bronze medal – third place	2022	BMX racing
World Junior Championships
Gold medal – first place	2017 Rock Hill	BMX racing
Silver medal – second place	2016 Medellín	BMX time trial
European Championships
Gold medal – first place	2022 Dessel	BMX racing
Gold medal – first place	2025 Valmiera	BMX racing
Silver medal – second place	2016 Verona	BMX time trial

Bethany Kate Shriever (born 19 April 1999) is a British cyclist, competing as a BMX racer. A World Junior champion in 2017 and winner of the UCI BMX Racing World Cup final event in Zolder in 2018. In 2021, Shriever won both the Olympic and World titles, equalling the feat of Colombian Mariana Pajón, who won Olympic silver.

In 2022, Shriever completed the full set of gold medals by winning the 2022 UEC BMX Racing European Championships; in doing so, she became the first BMX racing cyclist in history to hold Olympic, World and European titles simultaneously, and only the second, after Pajón in 2016, to hold a full set of World, Olympic and continental titles at once (Pajón having won gold at the Pan American Championships in 2016).

Shriever won further world titles in 2023, 2025 and 2026, and a further European title in 2025.

== Early life ==
Shriever was born in 1999 and she began BMX when she was aged eight years old. Thereafter she started training at her local club in Braintree and went on to start competing at weekends.

== Career ==
Shriever won the silver medal at the 2016 BMX European Cycling Championships In 2017 she became the Junior World Champion. In 2018 she finished 17th in her maiden appearance as a senior at the World Championships in Baku as well as winning the UCI BMX World Cup final in Belgium edging Judy Baauw and Laura Smulders into second and third. In March 2020 Shriever dominated the National BMX Series in Manchester without dropping a lap.

Shriever was chosen to be part of Great Britain's 26 strong cycling squad at the postponed 2020 Tokyo Olympics where she won the Women's BMX racing gold medal. Whilst being interviewed on TV after her win she couldn't refrain from swearing in her shock.

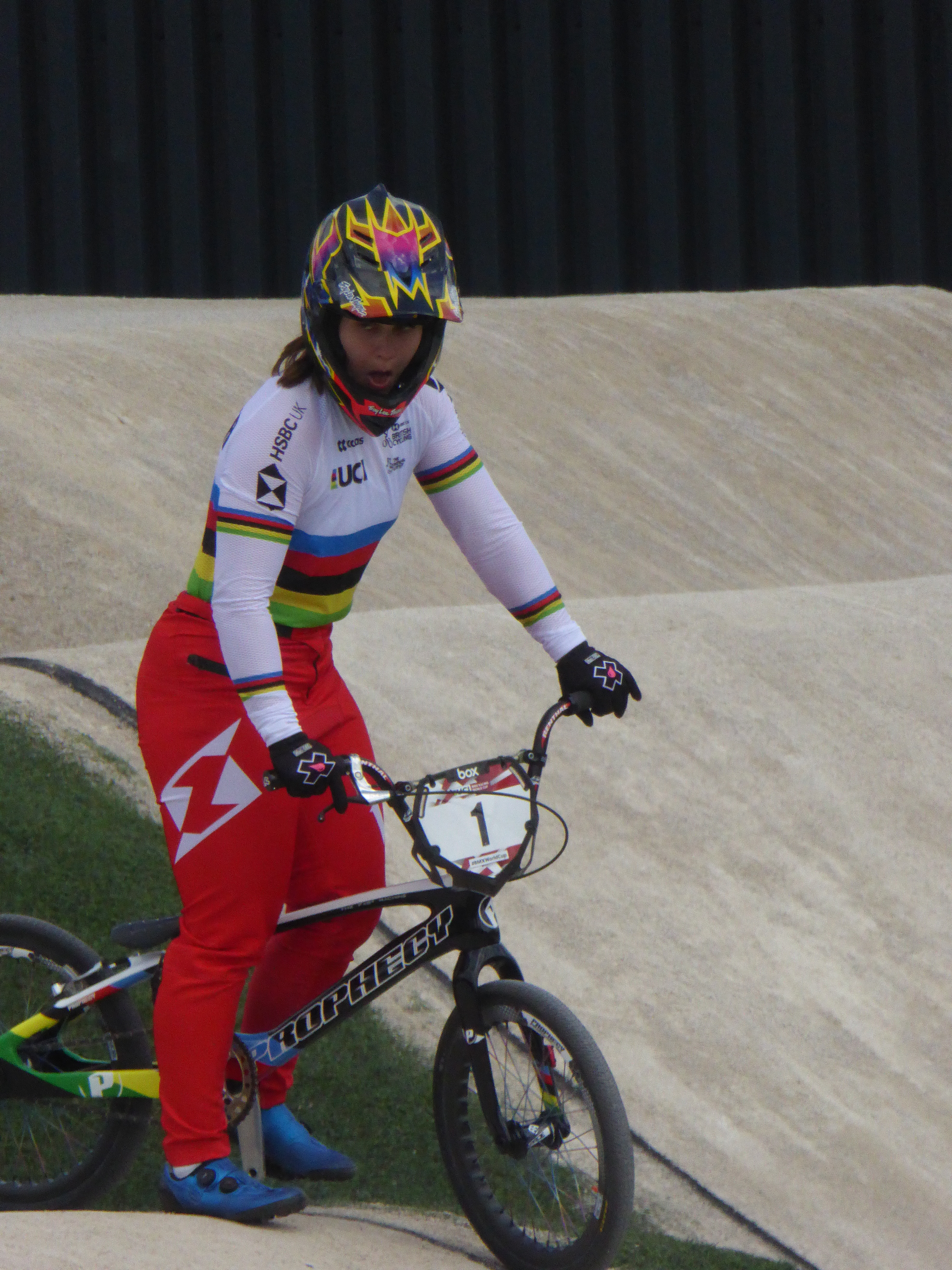
Beth Shriever in 2022

She subsequently won gold at the 2021 UCI BMX World Championships and the 2022 European BMX Championships, and at the 2023 UCI BMX World Championships in Glasgow, Scotland.

Having recovered from a broken collarbone in May 2024, she was selected for the 2024 Paris Olympics to defend her title. Shriever won all six of her races in reaching the final, but after being boxed in by the field finished in last place in the final.

She won the gold medal at the 2025 European BMX Championships in Valmiera, Latvia in July 2025. The following month, she won her third world title in Copenhagen at the 2025 UCI BMX World Championships.

In July 2026, Shriever competed at the 2026 UCI BMX Racing World Championships in Brisbane, Australia, and recorded the fastest lap on the opening day. On the second day, the event was curtailed by adverse weather causing all racing to be abandoned; having set the overall fastest lap time, Shriever was awarded a record fourth world title in accordance with the UCI rules.

== Personal life ==
Shriever worked part-time as a teaching assistant in a nursery at the Stephen Perse Foundation to cover some of her costs of training and travelling because UK Sport stipulated in its funding review after the 2016 Rio de Janeiro Olympic Games that only male riders would be supported heading towards Tokyo 2020.

Shriever was appointed Member of the Order of the British Empire (MBE) in the 2022 New Year Honours for services to BMX racing.

== Major results ==
2016
2nd European BMX Championships

2017
1st UCI BMX World Championships, Junior

2018
1st Stage 5, BMX Racing World Cup, Zolder

2021
1st BMX racing, Olympic Games
1st UCI BMX World Championships, Elite

2022
1st European BMX Championships

2023
1st UCI BMX World Championships, Elite

2025
1st UCI BMX World Championships, Elite
1st European BMX Championships

2025
1st UCI BMX World Championships, Elite
