= 2019 UCI BMX World Championships =

Bicycle racing competition

2019 World Championships
- Location: Heusden-Zolder, Belgium
- Dates: 23–27 July

The 2019 UCI BMX World Championships were held in Heusden-Zolder, Belgium from 23 to 27 July 2019.

== Medal summary ==
=== Elite events ===
Event	Gold		Silver		Bronze	
Men	Twan van Gendt; Netherlands	31.345	Niek Kimmann; Netherlands	35.455	Sylvain André; France	38.482
Women	Alise Willoughby; United States	34.701	Laura Smulders; Netherlands	35.146	Axelle Étienne; France	35.165

=== Junior events ===
Event	Gold		Silver		Bronze	
Men	Tatyan Lui-Hin-Tsan; France	32.254	Oliver Moran; Australia	33.209	Nathaniel Dieuaide; France	33.335
Women	Jessie Smith; New Zealand	35.653	Agustina Cavalli; Argentina	35.862	Zoé Claessens; Switzerland	36.589

== Medal table ==
* Host nation (Belgium)

Rank	Nation	Gold	Silver	Bronze	Total
1	Netherlands (NED)	1	2	0	3
2	France (FRA)	1	0	3	4
3	New Zealand (NZL)	1	0	0	1
3	United States (USA)	1	0	0	1
5	Argentina (ARG)	0	1	0	1
5	Australia (AUS)	0	1	0	1
7	Switzerland (SUI)	0	0	1	1
Totals (7 entries)		4	4	4	12

== See also ==
- 2019 UCI Track Cycling World Championships – Men's keirin
- 2019 UCI Track Cycling World Championships – Women's keirin
