= Edžus Treimanis =

Latvian BMX racer

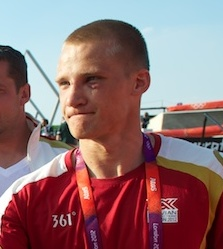
- Treimanis during the 2012 Olympics

Personal information
- Nationality: Latvian
- Born: 21 April 1988 (age 36); Valmiera, Latvia
- Height: 1.82 m (6 ft 0 in)
- Weight: 80 kg (176 lb)

Sport
- Country: Latvia
- Sport: BMX racing

Achievements and titles
- Olympic finals: 2012, 2016

Edžus Treimanis (born 21 April 1988) is a former Latvian BMX racer. He has qualified for and competed in both the 2012 Summer Olympics in London and the 2016 Summer Olympics in Rio de Janeiro. Treimanis has won several Latvian Champion titles. He won the silver medal at the 2011 and 2013 European Championships.

Treimanis was born in Valmiera, Latvia. He announced his retirement in November 2018.
