= Axelle Étienne =

French cyclist (born 1998)

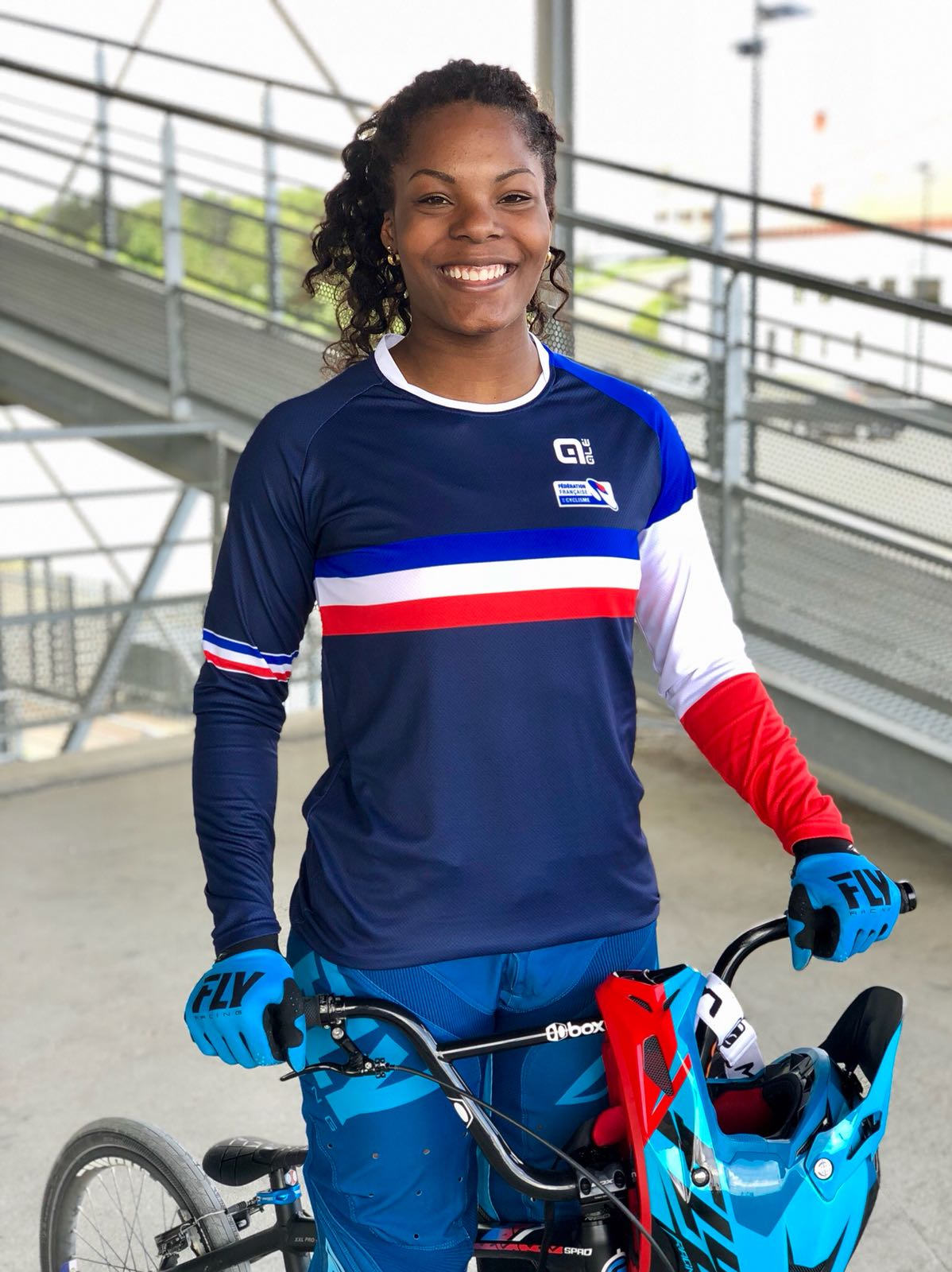
- 2018

Personal information
- Born: 26 March 1998 (age 28) Bondy, France

Cycling career
- Sport: Cycling
- Discipline: BMX racing
Medal record
Representing France
Women's BMX racing
World Championships
Bronze medal – third place	2019 Heusden-Zolder	BMX racing
European Championships
Bronze medal – third place	2026 Sarrians	BMX racing
World Junior Championships
Gold medal – first place	2015 Heusden-Zolder	BMX racing
Gold medal – first place	2015 Heusden-Zolder	BMX time trial

Axelle Étienne (born 26 March 1998 in Bondy) is a French cyclist who competes in the BMX.

Axelle was born in Bondy and grew up in Vaujours, in the department of Seine-Saint-Denis. Her parents are from the island of Guadeloupe. Her brother Patrick also competes in BMX racing with both showing promise at a young age. She won French junior titles in 2013 and 2014. Etienne then won the women's junior race and the women's junior time trial at the 2015 UCI BMX World Championships.

In 2017 Étienne won the French national title aged 19. Etienne won the bronze medal at the 2019 UCI BMX World Championships.

In June 2021, she was named among the French representatives for the delayed 2020 Summer Games in Tokyo to compete in the BMX racing, and placed 7th in the Women's BMX racing final.
