= Manon Valentino =

French cyclist

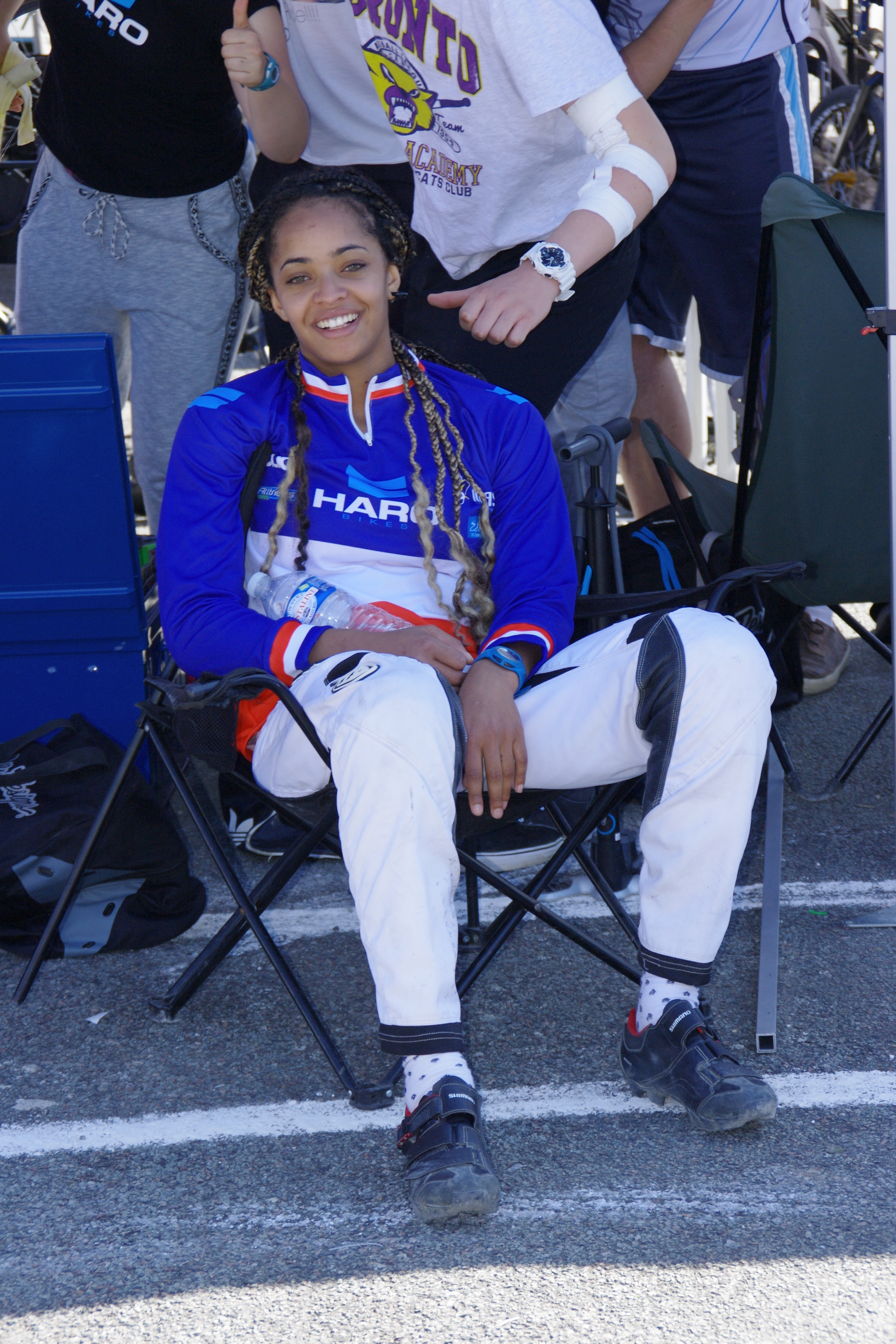

Personal information
- Nationality: French
- Born: 25 August 1990 (age 36) Valréas, Vaucluse, France
- Height: 1.72 m (5 ft 8 in)
- Weight: 64 kg (141 lb)

Sport
- Country: France
- Sport: Cycling, BMX
Medal record
Women's BMX racing
Representing France
| Event | 1st | 2nd | 3rd |
|---|---|---|---|
| World Championships | 0 | 1 | 1 |
| World Cup | 0 | 0 | 1 |
| World Cup rounds | 4 | 0 | 5 |
| World Junior Championships | 1 | 1 | 0 |
| Total | 5 | 2 | 7 |
World Championships
| Silver medal – second place | 2009 Adelaide | BMX cruiser |
| Bronze medal – third place | 2013 Auckland | BMX racing |
World Cup
| Bronze medal – third place | 2020 | BMX racing |
World Junior Championships
| Gold medal – first place | 2008 Taiyuan | BMX racing |
| Silver medal – second place | 2008 Taiyuan | BMX cruiser |

Manon Valentino (born 25 August 1990) is a French cyclist. She represented her country at the 2016 and 2020 Summer Olympics.
