= Laura Smulders =

Dutch racing cyclist (born 1993)

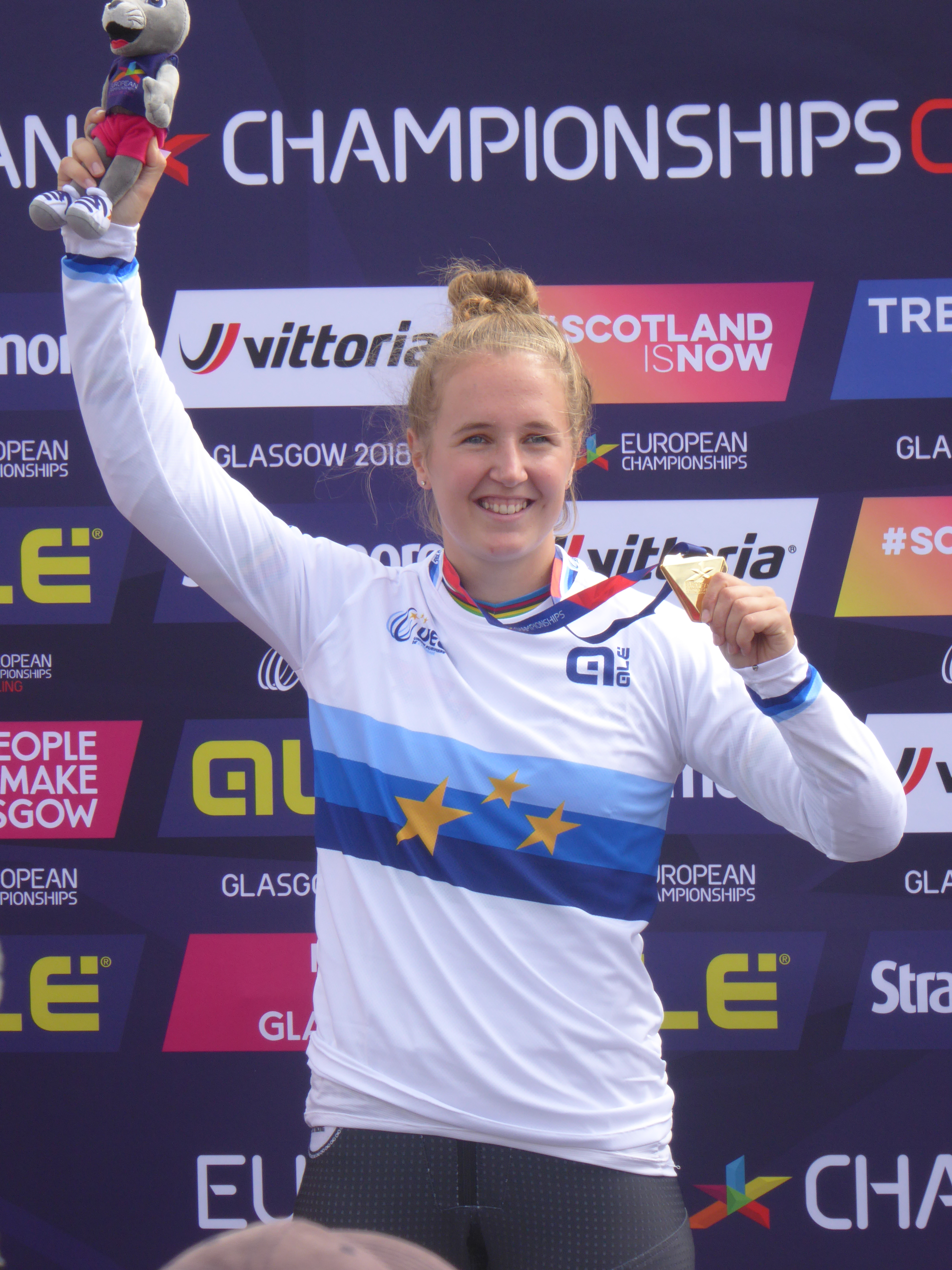
- Smulders in 2018

Personal information
- Nationality: Dutch
- Born: 9 December 1993 (age 32) Nijmegen, Netherlands
- Website: LauraSmulders.nl

Sport
- Country: Netherlands
- Sport: Cycling
- Event: BMX racing
Medal record
Women's BMX racing
Representing Netherlands
| Event | 1st | 2nd | 3rd |
|---|---|---|---|
| Olympic Games | 0 | 0 | 1 |
| World Championships | 2 | 3 | 3 |
| World Cup | 5 | 2 | 3 |
| World Cup rounds | 28 | 11 | 9 |
| European Championships | 5 | 1 | 2 |
| European Junior Championships | 1 | 1 | 0 |
| Total | 41 | 18 | 18 |
Olympic Games
| Bronze medal – third place | 2012 London | BMX racing |
World Championships
| Gold medal – first place | 2014 Rotterdam | BMX time trial |
| Gold medal – first place | 2018 Baku | BMX racing |
| Silver medal – second place | 2016 Medellín | BMX time trial |
| Silver medal – second place | 2019 Heusden-Zolder | BMX racing |
| Silver medal – second place | 2023 Glasgow | BMX racing |
| Bronze medal – third place | 2014 Rotterdam | BMX racing |
| Bronze medal – third place | 2021 Arnhem | BMX racing |
| Bronze medal – third place | 2026 Brisbane | BMX racing |
World Cup
| Gold medal – first place | 2016 | BMX racing |
| Gold medal – first place | 2017 | BMX racing |
| Gold medal – first place | 2018 | BMX racing |
| Gold medal – first place | 2019 | BMX racing |
| Gold medal – first place | 2022 | BMX racing |
| Silver medal – second place | 2021 | BMX racing |
| Silver medal – second place | 2025 | BMX racing |
| Bronze medal – third place | 2013 | BMX racing |
| Bronze medal – third place | 2014 | BMX racing |
| Bronze medal – third place | 2023 | BMX racing |
European Championships
| Gold medal – first place | 2014 Roskilde | BMX racing |
| Gold medal – first place | 2017 Bordeaux | BMX racing |
| Gold medal – first place | 2018 Glasgow | BMX racing |
| Gold medal – first place | 2019 Valmiera | BMX racing |
| Gold medal – first place | 2026 Sarrians | BMX racing |
| Silver medal – second place | 2024 Verona | BMX racing |
| Bronze medal – third place | 2015 Erp | BMX racing |
| Bronze medal – third place | 2025 Valmiera | BMX racing |
European Junior Championships
| Gold medal – first place | 2010 | BMX racing |
| Silver medal – second place | 2011 | BMX racing |

Laura Smulders (born 9 December 1993) is a Dutch racing cyclist who represents the Netherlands in BMX. She competed at the 2012 Summer Olympics in the women's BMX event where she won the bronze medal.

== Personal ==
Her younger sister, Merel Smulders is also a BMX rider and became junior World Time Trial Champion at the 2016 UCI BMX World Championships.

== See also ==
- List of Dutch Olympic cyclists
