= List of cyclists at the 2024 Summer Olympics =

This is a list of cyclists who competed at the 2024 Summer Olympics in Paris, France. The cyclists competed in 22 cycling events in the following disciplines:

- BMX:
  - Park (freestyle)
  - Racing
- mountain biking
- road cycling:
  - Individual Time Trial
  - Road Race
- track cycling:
  - Team Sprint:
  - Team Pursuit:

Nation	Cyclist	Discipline	Event	Olympic appearance	Note
Afghanistan	Fariba Hashimi	Road cycling	Women's road race	Debut	
Afghanistan	Yulduz Hashimi	Road cycling	Women's time trial	Debut	
Afghanistan	Yulduz Hashimi	Road cycling	Women's road race	Debut	
Algeria	Yacine Hamza	Road cycling	Men's road race	Debut	
Algeria	Nesrine Houili	Road cycling	Women's road race	Debut	
Argentina	Gonzalo Molina	BMX	Men's BMX Racing	2nd	
Argentina	Eduardo Sepúlveda	Road cycling	Men's road race	3rd	
Argentina	José Torres	BMX	Men's BMX Freestyle	Debut	
Aruba	Shanayah Howell	BMX	Women's BMX Racing	Debut	
Australia	Georgia Baker	Track cycling	Women's team pursuit	3rd	
Australia	Georgia Baker	Track cycling	Women's Madison	2nd	
Australia	Georgia Baker	Track cycling	Women's omnium	Debut	
Australia	Oliver Bleddyn	Track cycling	Men's team pursuit	Debut	
Australia	Grace Brown	Road cycling	Women's time trial	2nd	
Australia	Grace Brown	Road cycling	Women's road race	2nd	
Australia	Simon Clarke	Road cycling	Men's road race	2nd	
Australia	Kristina Clonan	Track cycling	Women's sprint	Debut	
Australia	Kristina Clonan	Track cycling	Women's keirin	Debut	
Australia	Natalya Diehm	BMX	Women's BMX Freestyle	2nd	
Australia	Sophie Edwards	Track cycling	Women's team pursuit	Debut	
Australia	Matthew Glaetzer	Track cycling	Men's team sprint	3rd	
Australia	Matthew Glaetzer	Track cycling	Men's keirin	3rd	
Australia	Lauretta Hanson	Road cycling	Women's road race	Debut	
Australia	Rebecca Henderson	Mountain biking	Women's cross-country	4th	
Australia	Leigh Hoffman	Track cycling	Men's sprint	Debut	
Australia	Leigh Hoffman	Track cycling	Men's team sprint	Debut	
Australia	Izaac Kennedy	BMX	Men's BMX Racing	Debut	
Australia	Conor Leahy	Track cycling	Men's team pursuit	Debut	
Australia	Alexandra Manly	Track cycling	Women's team pursuit	2nd	
Australia	Alexandra Manly	Track cycling	Women's Madison	Debut	
Australia	Logan Martin	BMX	Men's BMX Freestyle	2nd	
Australia	Michael Matthews	Road cycling	Men's road race	Debut	
Australia	Chloe Moran	Track cycling	Women's sprint	Debut	
Australia	Chloe Moran	Track cycling	Women's keirin	Debut	
Australia	Chloe Moran	Track cycling	Women's team pursuit	Debut	
Australia	Kelland O'Brien	Track cycling	Men's team pursuit	2nd	
Australia	Kelland O'Brien	Track cycling	Men's Madison	2nd	
Australia	Ben O'Connor	Road cycling	Men's road race	Debut	
Australia	Luke Plapp	Road cycling	Men's time trial	Debut	
Australia	Maeve Plouffe	Track cycling	Women's team pursuit	2nd	
Australia	Lauren Reynolds	BMX	Women's BMX Racing	4th	
Australia	Matthew Richardson	Track cycling	Men's sprint	2nd	
Australia	Matthew Richardson	Track cycling	Men's team sprint	2nd	
Australia	Matthew Richardson	Track cycling	Men's keirin	2nd	
Australia	Ruby Roseman-Gannon	Road cycling	Women's road race	Debut	
Australia	Saya Sakakibara	BMX	Women's BMX Racing	2nd	
Australia	Sam Welsford	Track cycling	Men's team pursuit	3rd	
Australia	Sam Welsford	Track cycling	Men's Madison	2nd	
Australia	Sam Welsford	Track cycling	Men's omnium	2nd	
Austria	Maximilian Foidl	Mountain biking	Men's cross-country	2nd	
Austria	Felix Großschartner	Road cycling	Men's time trial	Debut	
Austria	Felix Großschartner	Road cycling	Men's road race	Debut	
Austria	Marco Haller	Road cycling	Men's road race	Debut	
Austria	Anna Kiesenhofer	Road cycling	Women's time trial	Debut	
Austria	Anna Kiesenhofer	Road cycling	Women's road race	2nd	
Austria	Raphael Kokas	Track cycling	Men's Madison	Debut	
Austria	Mona Mitterwallner	Mountain biking	Women's cross-country	Debut	
Austria	Maximilian Schmidbauer	Track cycling	Men's Madison	Debut	
Austria	Christina Schweinberger	Road cycling	Women's time trial	Debut	
Austria	Christina Schweinberger	Road cycling	Women's road race	Debut	
Austria	Laura Stigger	Mountain biking	Women's cross-country	2nd	
Austria	Tim Wafler	Track cycling	Men's omnium	Debut	
Belgium	Tiesj Benoot	Road cycling	Men's road race	2nd	
Belgium	Katrijn De Clercq	Track cycling	Women's Madison	Debut	
Belgium	Pierre de Froidmont	Mountain biking	Men's cross-country	Debut	
Belgium	Lindsay De Vylder	Track cycling	Men's team pursuit	Debut	
Belgium	Lindsay De Vylder	Track cycling	Men's Madison	Debut	
Belgium	Nicky Degrendele	Track cycling	Women's sprint	Debut	
Belgium	Nicky Degrendele	Track cycling	Women's keirin	Debut	
Belgium	Tuur Dens	Track cycling	Men's team pursuit	Debut	
Belgium	Emeline Detilleux	Mountain biking	Women's cross-country	Debut	
Belgium	Remco Evenepoel	Road cycling	Men's time trial	2nd	
Belgium	Remco Evenepoel	Road cycling	Men's road race	2nd	
Belgium	Justine Ghekiere	Road cycling	Women's road race	Debut	
Belgium	Aiko Gommers	BMX	Women's BMX Racing	Debut	
Belgium	Ruben Gommers	BMX	Men's BMX Racing	Debut	
Belgium	Hélène Hesters	Track cycling	Women's Madison	Debut	
Belgium	Lotte Kopecky	Road cycling	Women's time trial	2nd	
Belgium	Lotte Kopecky	Road cycling	Women's road race	3rd	
Belgium	Lotte Kopecky	Track cycling	Women's omnium	2nd	
Belgium	Julie Nicolaes	Track cycling	Women's sprint	Debut	
Belgium	Julie Nicolaes	Track cycling	Women's keirin	Debut	
Belgium	Jens Schuermans	Mountain biking	Men's cross-country	3rd	
Belgium	Jasper Stuyven	Road cycling	Men's road race	Debut	
Belgium	Noah Vandenbranden	Track cycling	Men's team pursuit	Debut	
Belgium	Margot Vanpachtenbeke	Road cycling	Women's road race	Debut	
Belgium	Wout van Aert	Road cycling	Men's time trial	2nd	
Belgium	Wout van Aert	Road cycling	Men's road race	2nd	
Belgium	Julie Van de Velde	Road cycling	Women's road race	2nd	
Belgium	Fabio Van den Bossche	Track cycling	Men's team pursuit	Debut	
Belgium	Fabio Van den Bossche	Track cycling	Men's Madison	Debut	
Belgium	Fabio Van den Bossche	Track cycling	Men's omnium	Debut	
Brazil	Ulan Bastos Galinski	Mountain biking	Men's cross-country	Debut	
Brazil	Raiza Goulão	Mountain biking	Women's cross-country	2nd	
Brazil	Ana Vitória Magalhães	Road cycling	Women's road race	Debut	
Brazil	Gustavo Oliveira	BMX	Men's BMX Freestyle	Debut	
Brazil	Vinícius Rangel	Road cycling	Men's road race	Debut	
Brazil	Paola Reis	BMX	Women's BMX Racing	Debut	
Burkina Faso	Awa Bamogo	Road cycling	Women's road race	Debut	
Canada	Erin Attwell	Track cycling	Women's team pursuit	Debut	
Canada	Olivia Baril	Road cycling	Women's time trial	Debut	
Canada	Olivia Baril	Road cycling	Women's road race	Debut	
Canada	Dylan Bibic	Track cycling	Men's team pursuit	Debut	
Canada	Dylan Bibic	Track cycling	Men's omnium	Debut	
Canada	Ariane Bonhomme	Track cycling	Women's team pursuit	2nd	
Canada	Ariane Bonhomme	Track cycling	Women's Madison	Debut	
Canada	Maggie Coles-Lyster	Track cycling	Women's team pursuit	Debut	
Canada	Maggie Coles-Lyster	Track cycling	Women's Madison	Debut	
Canada	Maggie Coles-Lyster	Track cycling	Women's omnium	Debut	
Canada	Michael Foley	Track cycling	Men's team pursuit	2nd	
Canada	Michael Foley	Track cycling	Men's Madison	2nd	
Canada	Derek Gee	Road cycling	Men's time trial	Debut	
Canada	Derek Gee	Road cycling	Men's road race	Debut	
Canada	Lauriane Genest	Track cycling	Women's sprint	2nd	
Canada	Lauriane Genest	Track cycling	Women's team sprint	Debut	
Canada	Lauriane Genest	Track cycling	Women's keirin	2nd	
Canada	Mathias Guillemette	Track cycling	Men's team pursuit	Debut	
Canada	Mathias Guillemette	Track cycling	Men's Madison	Debut	
Canada	James Hedgcock	Track cycling	Men's team sprint	Debut	
Canada	James Hedgcock	Track cycling	Men's keirin	Debut	
Canada	Gunnar Holmgren	Mountain biking	Men's cross-country	Debut	
Canada	Isabella Holmgren	Mountain biking	Women's cross-country	Debut	
Canada	Alison Jackson	Road cycling	Women's road race	2nd	
Canada	Carson Mattern	Track cycling	Men's team pursuit	Debut	
Canada	Kelsey Mitchell	Track cycling	Women's sprint	2nd	
Canada	Kelsey Mitchell	Track cycling	Women's team sprint	Debut	
Canada	Kelsey Mitchell	Track cycling	Women's keirin	2nd	
Canada	Sarah Orban	Track cycling	Women's team sprint	Debut	
Canada	Tyler Rorke	Track cycling	Men's sprint	Debut	
Canada	Tyler Rorke	Track cycling	Men's team sprint	Debut	
Canada	Molly Simpson	BMX	Women's BMX Racing	Debut	
Canada	Sarah Van Dam	Track cycling	Women's team pursuit	Debut	
Canada	Nick Wammes	Track cycling	Men's sprint	2nd	
Canada	Nick Wammes	Track cycling	Men's team sprint	Debut	
Canada	Nick Wammes	Track cycling	Men's keirin	2nd	
Canada	Jeffrey Whaley	BMX	Men's BMX Freestyle	Debut	
Canada	Michael Woods	Road cycling	Men's road race	3rd	
Chile	Martín Vidaurre	Mountain biking	Men's cross-country	2nd	
Chile	Mauricio Molina	BMX	Men's BMX Racing	Debut	
Chile	Macarena Perez Grasset	BMX	Women's BMX Freestyle	2nd	
Chile	Catalina Soto	Road cycling	Women's road race	2nd	
China	Bao Shanju	Track cycling	Women's sprint	2nd	
China	Bao Shanju	Track cycling	Women's team sprint	2nd	
China	Deng Yawen	BMX	Women's BMX Freestyle	Debut	
China	Guo Shuai	Track cycling	Men's team sprint	Debut	
China	Guo Yufang	Track cycling	Women's team sprint	Debut	
China	Guo Yufang	Track cycling	Women's keirin	Debut	
China	Liu Jiali	Track cycling	Women's omnium	2nd	
China	Liu Qi	Track cycling	Men's sprint	Debut	
China	Liu Qi	Track cycling	Men's team sprint	Debut	
China	Liu Qi	Track cycling	Men's keirin	Debut	
China	Lü Xianjing	Road cycling	Men's road race	Debut	
China	Jiujiang Mi	Mountain biking	Men's cross-country	Debut	
China	Sun Jiaqi	BMX	Women's BMX Freestyle	Debut	
China	Tang Xin	Road cycling	Women's time trial	Debut	
China	Tang Xin	Road cycling	Women's road race	Debut	
China	Yuan Liying	Track cycling	Women's sprint	Debut	
China	Yuan Liying	Track cycling	Women's team sprint	Debut	
China	Yuan Liying	Track cycling	Women's keirin	Debut	
China	Zhifan Wu	Mountain biking	Women's cross-country	Debut	
China	Zhou Yu	Track cycling	Men's sprint	Debut	
China	Zhou Yu	Track cycling	Men's team sprint	Debut	
China	Zhou Yu	Track cycling	Men's keirin	Debut	
Colombia	Diego Arboleda	BMX	Men's BMX Racing	Debut	
Colombia	Martha Bayona	Track cycling	Women's sprint	Debut	
Colombia	Martha Bayona	Track cycling	Women's keirin	2nd	
Colombia	Gabriela Bolle	BMX	Women's BMX Racing	Debut	
Colombia	Santiago Buitrago	Road cycling	Men's road race	Debut	
Colombia	Mateo Carmona	BMX	Men's BMX Racing	Debut	
Colombia	Stefany Cuadrado	Track cycling	Women's sprint	Debut	
Colombia	Stefany Cuadrado	Track cycling	Women's keirin	Debut	
Colombia	Diego Arias	Mountain biking	Men's cross-country	Debut	
Colombia	Fernando Gaviria	Track cycling	Men's omnium	2nd	
Colombia	Daniel Martínez	Road cycling	Men's road race	Debut	
Colombia	Cristian Ortega	Track cycling	Men's sprint	Debut	
Colombia	Cristian Ortega	Track cycling	Men's keirin	Debut	
Colombia	Mariana Pajón	BMX	Women's BMX Racing	4th	
Colombia	Paula Patiño	Road cycling	Women's road race	2nd	
Colombia	Kevin Quintero	Track cycling	Men's sprint	2nd	
Colombia	Kevin Quintero	Track cycling	Men's keirin	2nd	
Colombia	Carlos Ramírez	BMX	Men's BMX Racing	3rd	
Colombia	Queen Saray Villegas	BMX	Women's BMX Freestyle	Debut	
Costa Rica	Milagro Mena	Road cycling	Women's road race	2nd	
Croatia	Marin Ranteš	BMX	Men's BMX Freestyle	Debut	
Cuba	Arlenis Sierra	Road cycling	Women's road race	3rd	
Cyprus	Antri Christoforou	Road cycling	Women's road race	3rd	
Czech Republic	Ondřej Cink	Mountain biking	Men's cross-country	4th	
Czech Republic	Adéla Holubová	Mountain biking	Women's cross-country	Debut	
Czech Republic	Julia Kopecký	Road cycling	Women's time trial	Debut	
Czech Republic	Julia Kopecký	Road cycling	Women's road race	Debut	
Czech Republic	Iveta Miculyčová	BMX	Women's BMX Freestyle	Debut	
Czech Republic	Denis Rugovac	Track cycling	Men's Madison	Debut	
Czech Republic	Mathias Vacek	Road cycling	Men's time trial	Debut	
Czech Republic	Mathias Vacek	Road cycling	Men's road race	Debut	
Czech Republic	Jan Voneš	Track cycling	Men's Madison	Debut	
Czech Republic	Jan Voneš	Track cycling	Men's omnium	Debut	
Denmark	Simon Andreassen	Mountain biking	Men's cross-country	2nd	
Denmark	Carl-Frederik Bévort	Track cycling	Men's team pursuit	Debut	
Denmark	Mikkel Bjerg	Road cycling	Men's time trial	Debut	
Denmark	Mikkel Bjerg	Road cycling	Men's road race	Debut	
Denmark	Caroline Bohé	Mountain biking	Women's cross-country	2nd	
Denmark	Amalie Dideriksen	Track cycling	Women's Madison	2nd	
Denmark	Amalie Dideriksen	Track cycling	Women's omnium	3rd	
Denmark	Tobias Hansen	Track cycling	Men's team pursuit	Debut	
Denmark	Malene Kejlstrup	BMX	Women's BMX Racing	Debut	
Denmark	Rebecca Koerner	Road cycling	Women's road race	Debut	
Denmark	Niklas Larsen	Track cycling	Men's team pursuit	3rd	
Denmark	Niklas Larsen	Track cycling	Men's Madison	Debut	
Denmark	Niklas Larsen	Track cycling	Men's omnium	2nd	
Denmark	Cecilie Uttrup Ludwig	Road cycling	Women's time trial	Debut	
Denmark	Cecilie Uttrup Ludwig	Road cycling	Women's road race	2nd	
Denmark	Michael Mørkøv	Road cycling	Men's road race	Debut	
Denmark	Michael Mørkøv	Track cycling	Men's Madison	3rd	
Denmark	Julie Norman Leth	Track cycling	Women's Madison	2nd	
Denmark	Emma Norsgaard	Road cycling	Women's time trial	2nd	
Denmark	Emma Norsgaard	Road cycling	Women's road race	2nd	
Denmark	Mads Pedersen	Road cycling	Men's road race	Debut	
Denmark	Rasmus Pedersen	Track cycling	Men's team pursuit	2nd	
Denmark	Sofie Heby Pedersen	Mountain biking	Women's cross-country	Debut	
Denmark	Mattias Skjelmose	Road cycling	Men's time trial	Debut	
Denmark	Mattias Skjelmose	Road cycling	Men's road race	Debut	
Ecuador	Alfredo Campo	BMX	Men's BMX Racing	3rd	
Ecuador	Jhonatan Narváez	Road cycling	Men's road race	2nd	
Egypt	Youssef Abouelhassan	Track cycling	Men's omnium	Debut	
Egypt	Ebtissam Mohamed	Track cycling	Women's omnium	2nd	
Eritrea	Biniam Girmay	Road cycling	Men's time trial	Debut	
Eritrea	Biniam Girmay	Road cycling	Men's road race	Debut	
Estonia	Janika Lõiv	Mountain biking	Women's cross-country	2nd	
Estonia	Madis Mihkels	Road cycling	Men's road race	Debut	
France	Julian Alaphilippe	Road cycling	Men's road race	2nd	
France	Sylvain André	BMX	Men's BMX Racing	2nd	
France	Victoire Berteau	Road cycling	Women's road race	Debut	
France	Victoire Berteau	Track cycling	Women's team pursuit	2nd	
France	Marion Borras	Track cycling	Women's team pursuit	2nd	
France	Marion Borras	Track cycling	Women's Madison	Debut	
France	Thomas Boudat	Track cycling	Men's team pursuit	Debut	
France	Thomas Boudat	Track cycling	Men's Madison	Debut	
France	Clara Copponi	Track cycling	Women's team pursuit	Debut	
France	Clara Copponi	Track cycling	Women's Madison	2nd	
France	Audrey Cordon-Ragot	Road cycling	Women's time trial	3rd	
France	Audrey Cordon-Ragot	Road cycling	Women's road race	3rd	
France	Joris Daudet	BMX	Men's BMX Racing	4th	
France	Thomas Denis	Track cycling	Men's team pursuit	Debut	
France	Axelle Étienne	BMX	Women's BMX Racing	2nd	
France	Pauline Ferrand-Prévot	Mountain biking	Women's cross-country	4th	
France	Valentine Fortin	Track cycling	Women's team pursuit	2nd	
France	Valentine Fortin	Track cycling	Women's omnium	Debut	
France	Florian Grengbo	Track cycling	Men's sprint	2nd	
France	Mathilde Gros	Track cycling	Women's sprint	2nd	
France	Mathilde Gros	Track cycling	Women's keirin	2nd	
France	Rayan Helal	Track cycling	Men's sprint	2nd	
France	Rayan Helal	Track cycling	Men's team sprint	2nd	
France	Rayan Helal	Track cycling	Men's keirin	2nd	
France	Anthony Jeanjean	BMX	Men's BMX Freestyle	2nd	
France	Victor Koretzky	Mountain biking	Men's cross-country	3rd	
France	Juliette Labous	Road cycling	Women's time trial	2nd	
France	Juliette Labous	Road cycling	Women's road race	2nd	
France	Christophe Laporte	Road cycling	Men's road race	Debut	
France	Marie Le Net	Track cycling	Women's team pursuit	2nd	
France	Loana Lecomte	Mountain biking	Women's cross-country	2nd	
France	Valentin Madouas	Road cycling	Men's road race	Debut	
France	Romain Mahieu	BMX	Men's BMX Racing	2nd	
France	Taky Marie-Divine Kouamé	Track cycling	Women's sprint	Debut	
France	Taky Marie-Divine Kouamé	Track cycling	Women's keirin	Debut	
France	Laury Perez	BMX	Women's BMX Freestyle	Debut	
France	Jordan Sarrou	Mountain biking	Men's cross-country	2nd	
France	Valentin Tabellion	Track cycling	Men's team pursuit	Debut	
France	Benjamin Thomas	Track cycling	Men's team pursuit	Debut	
France	Benjamin Thomas	Track cycling	Men's Madison	2nd	
France	Benjamin Thomas	Track cycling	Men's omnium	2nd	
France	Kévin Vauquelin	Road cycling	Men's time trial	Debut	
France	Kévin Vauquelin	Road cycling	Men's road race	Debut	
France	Sébastien Vigier	Track cycling	Men's sprint	2nd	
France	Sébastien Vigier	Track cycling	Men's team sprint	2nd	
France	Sébastien Vigier	Track cycling	Men's keirin	2nd	
Finland	Anniina Ahtosalo	Road cycling	Women's time trial	Debut	
Finland	Anniina Ahtosalo	Road cycling	Women's road race	Debut	
Finland	Joni Savaste	Mountain biking	Men's cross-country	Debut	
Germany	Alina Beck	BMX	Women's BMX Racing	Debut	
Germany	Nina Benz	Mountain biking	Women's cross-country	Debut	
Germany	Stefan Bötticher	Track cycling	Men's team sprint	2nd	
Germany	Franziska Brauße	Track cycling	Women's team pursuit	2nd	
Germany	Franziska Brauße	Track cycling	Women's Madison	2nd	
Germany	Franziska Brauße	Track cycling	Women's omnium	Debut	
Germany	Tobias Buck-Gramcko	Track cycling	Men's team pursuit	Debut	
Germany	Maximilian Dörnbach	Track cycling	Men's sprint	Debut	
Germany	Maximilian Dörnbach	Track cycling	Men's team sprint	Debut	
Germany	Maximilian Dörnbach	Track cycling	Men's keirin	Debut	
Germany	Lea Friedrich	Track cycling	Women's sprint	2nd	
Germany	Lea Friedrich	Track cycling	Women's team sprint	2nd	
Germany	Lea Friedrich	Track cycling	Women's keirin	2nd	
Germany	Pauline Grabosch	Track cycling	Women's team sprint	Debut	
Germany	Emma Hinze	Track cycling	Women's sprint	2nd	
Germany	Emma Hinze	Track cycling	Women's team sprint	2nd	
Germany	Emma Hinze	Track cycling	Women's keirin	2nd	
Germany	Lisa Klein	Track cycling	Women's team pursuit	2nd	
Germany	Roger Kluge	Track cycling	Men's team pursuit	Debut	
Germany	Roger Kluge	Track cycling	Men's Madison	3rd	
Germany	Franziska Koch	Road cycling	Women's road race	Debut	
Germany	Mieke Kröger	Road cycling	Women's time trial	Debut	
Germany	Mieke Kröger	Track cycling	Women's team pursuit	3rd	
Germany	Liane Lippert	Road cycling	Women's road race	2nd	
Germany	Kim Lea Müller	BMX	Women's BMX freestyle	Debut	
Germany	Antonia Niedermaier	Road cycling	Women's time trial	Debut	
Germany	Antonia Niedermaier	Road cycling	Women's road race	Debut	
Germany	Nils Politt	Road cycling	Men's road race	Debut	
Germany	Theo Reinhardt	Track cycling	Men's team pursuit	3rd	
Germany	Theo Reinhardt	Track cycling	Men's Madison	2nd	
Germany	Lena Charlotte Reißner	Track cycling	Women's team pursuit	Debut	
Germany	Lena Charlotte Reißner	Track cycling	Women's Madison	Debut	
Germany	Maximilian Schachmann	Road cycling	Men's time trial	2nd	
Germany	Maximilian Schachmann	Road cycling	Men's road race	2nd	
Germany	Philip Schaub	BMX	Men's BMX Racing	Debut	
Germany	Julian Schelb	Mountain biking	Men's cross-country	Debut	
Germany	Nik Schröter	Track cycling	Men's team sprint	Debut	
Germany	Luca Schwarzbauer	Mountain biking	Men's cross-country	3rd	
Germany	Luca Spiegel	Track cycling	Men's sprint	Debut	
Germany	Luca Spiegel	Track cycling	Men's team sprint	Debut	
Germany	Luca Spiegel	Track cycling	Men's keirin	Debut	
Germany	Laura Süßemilch	Track cycling	Women's team pursuit	Debut	
Germany	Tim Torn Teutenberg	Track cycling	Men's team pursuit	Debut	
Germany	Tim Torn Teutenberg	Track cycling	Men's omnium	Debut	
Great Britain	Charlie Aldridge	Mountain biking	Men's cross-country	Debut	
Great Britain	Elinor Barker	Track cycling	Women's team pursuit	3rd	
Great Britain	Elinor Barker	Track cycling	Women's Madison	Debut	
Great Britain	Daniel Bigham	Track cycling	Men's team pursuit	Debut	
Great Britain	Sophie Capewell	Track cycling	Women's sprint	Debut	
Great Britain	Sophie Capewell	Track cycling	Women's team sprint	Debut	
Great Britain	Jack Carlin	Track cycling	Men's sprint	2nd	
Great Britain	Jack Carlin	Track cycling	Men's team sprint	2nd	
Great Britain	Jack Carlin	Track cycling	Men's keirin	2nd	
Great Britain	Lizzie Deignan	Road cycling	Women's road race	4th	
Great Britain	Neah Evans	Track cycling	Women's Madison	Debut	
Great Britain	Neah Evans	Track cycling	Women's omnium	Debut	
Great Britain	Emma Finucane	Track cycling	Women's sprint	Debut	
Great Britain	Emma Finucane	Track cycling	Women's team sprint	Debut	
Great Britain	Emma Finucane	Track cycling	Women's keirin	Debut	
Great Britain	Pfeiffer Georgi	Road cycling	Women's road race	Debut	
Great Britain	Ethan Hayter	Track cycling	Men's team pursuit	2nd	
Great Britain	Ethan Hayter	Track cycling	Men's omnium	Debut	
Great Britain	Anna Henderson	Road cycling	Women's time trial	Debut	
Great Britain	Anna Henderson	Road cycling	Women's road race	Debut	
Great Britain	Josie Knight	Track cycling	Women's team pursuit	2nd	
Great Britain	Ed Lowe	Track cycling	Men's team sprint	Debut	
Great Britain	Ella Maclean-Howell	Mountain biking	Women's cross-country	Debut	
Great Britain	Katy Marchant	Track cycling	Women's team sprint	Debut	
Great Britain	Katy Marchant	Track cycling	Women's keirin	2nd	
Great Britain	Anna Morris	Track cycling	Women's team pursuit	Debut	
Great Britain	Tom Pidcock	Mountain biking	Men's cross-country	2nd	
Great Britain	Tom Pidcock	Road cycling	Men's road race	Debut	
Great Britain	Kieran Reilly	BMX	Men's BMX freestyle	Debut	
Great Britain	Evie Richards	Mountain biking	Women's cross-country	2nd	
Great Britain	Jessica Roberts	Track cycling	Women's team pursuit	Debut	
Great Britain	Beth Shriever	BMX	Women's BMX Racing	2nd	
Great Britain	Mark Stewart	Track cycling	Men's Madison	Debut	
Great Britain	Charlie Tanfield	Track cycling	Men's team pursuit	2nd	
Great Britain	Josh Tarling	Road cycling	Men's time trial	Debut	
Great Britain	Josh Tarling	Road cycling	Men's road race	Debut	
Great Britain	Hamish Turnbull	Track cycling	Men's sprint	Debut	
Great Britain	Hamish Turnbull	Track cycling	Men's team sprint	Debut	
Great Britain	Hamish Turnbull	Track cycling	Men's keirin	Debut	
Great Britain	Ethan Vernon	Track cycling	Men's team pursuit	2nd	
Great Britain	Kye Whyte	BMX	Men's BMX Racing	2nd	
Great Britain	Stephen Williams	Road cycling	Men's road race	Debut	
Great Britain	Oliver Wood	Track cycling	Men's team pursuit	2nd	
Great Britain	Oliver Wood	Track cycling	Men's Madison	Debut	
Great Britain	Charlotte Worthington	BMX	Women's BMX freestyle	2nd	
Great Britain	Fred Wright	Road cycling	Men's road race	Debut	
Greece	Georgios Bouglas	Road cycling	Men's road race	Debut	
Hong Kong	Vincent Lau Wan Yau	Road cycling	Men's road race	Debut	
Hong Kong	Lee Sze Wing	Road cycling	Women's road race	Debut	
Hong Kong	Lee Sze Wing	Track cycling	Women's omnium	Debut	
Hungary	Attila Valter	Road cycling	Men's time trial	Debut	
Hungary	Attila Valter	Road cycling	Men's road race	2nd	
Hungary	Blanka Vas	Mountain biking	Women's cross-country	2nd	
Hungary	Blanka Vas	Road cycling	Women's road race	Debut	
Individual Neutral Athletes	Tamara Dronova	Road cycling	Women's time trial	Debut	
Individual Neutral Athletes	Tamara Dronova	Road cycling	Women's road race	2nd	
Individual Neutral Athletes	Alena Ivanchenko	Road cycling	Women's road race	Debut	
Individual Neutral Athletes	Gleb Syritsa	Road cycling	Men's time trial	Debut	
Individual Neutral Athletes	Gleb Syritsa	Road cycling	Men's road race	Debut	
Individual Neutral Athletes	Hanna Tserakh	Road cycling	Women's time trial	Debut	
Individual Neutral Athletes	Hanna Tserakh	Road cycling	Women's road race	Debut	
Indonesia	Bernard Van Aert	Track cycling	Men's omnium	Debut	
Iran	Ali Labib	Road cycling	Men's road race	Debut	
Ireland	Megan Armitage	Road cycling	Women's road race	Debut	
Ireland	Lara Gillespie	Track cycling	Women's team pursuit	Debut	
Ireland	Lara Gillespie	Track cycling	Women's Madison	Debut	
Ireland	Lara Gillespie	Track cycling	Women's omnium	Debut	
Ireland	Mia Griffin	Track cycling	Women's team pursuit	Debut	
Ireland	Ben Healy	Road cycling	Men's road race	Debut	
Ireland	Ryan Mullen	Road cycling	Men's time trial	Debut	
Ireland	Ryan Mullen	Road cycling	Men's road race	Debut	
Ireland	Kelly Murphy	Track cycling	Women's team pursuit	Debut	
Ireland	Alice Sharpe	Track cycling	Women's team pursuit	Debut	
Ireland	Alice Sharpe	Track cycling	Women's Madison	Debut	
Israel	Itamar Einhorn	Road cycling	Men's road race	Debut	
Israel	Rotem Gafinovitz	Road cycling	Women's road race	Debut	
Israel	Mikhail Iakovlev	Track cycling	Men's sprint	Debut	
Israel	Mikhail Iakovlev	Track cycling	Men's keirin	Debut	
Israel	Tomer Zaltsman	Mountain biking	Men's cross-country	Debut	
Italy	Simone Avondetto	Mountain biking	Men's cross-country	Debut	
Italy	Elisa Balsamo	Road cycling	Women's road race	Debut	
Italy	Elisa Balsamo	Track cycling	Women's team pursuit	2nd	
Italy	Martina Berta	Mountain biking	Women's cross-country	Debut	
Italy	Pietro Bertagnoli	BMX	Men's BMX Racing	Debut	
Italy	Alberto Bettiol	Road cycling	Men's time trial	2nd	
Italy	Alberto Bettiol	Road cycling	Men's road race	2nd	
Italy	Elisa Longo Borghini	Road cycling	Women's time trial	3rd	
Italy	Elisa Longo Borghini	Road cycling	Women's road race	3rd	
Italy	Luca Braidot	Mountain biking	Men's cross-country	Debut	
Italy	Elena Cecchini	Road cycling	Women's road race	2nd	
Italy	Chiara Consonni	Track cycling	Women's team pursuit	Debut	
Italy	Chiara Consonni	Track cycling	Women's Madison	Debut	
Italy	Simone Consonni	Track cycling	Men's team pursuit	3rd	
Italy	Simone Consonni	Track cycling	Men's Madison	2nd	
Italy	Martina Fidanza	Track cycling	Women's team pursuit	Debut	
Italy	Sara Fiorin	Track cycling	Women's sprint	Debut	
Italy	Sara Fiorin	Track cycling	Women's keirin	Debut	
Italy	Filippo Ganna	Road cycling	Men's time trial	2nd	
Italy	Filippo Ganna	Track cycling	Men's team pursuit	3rd	
Italy	Vittoria Guazzini	Track cycling	Women's team pursuit	2nd	
Italy	Vittoria Guazzini	Track cycling	Women's Madison	Debut	
Italy	Francesco Lamon	Track cycling	Men's team pursuit	3rd	
Italy	Jonathan Milan	Track cycling	Men's team pursuit	2nd	
Italy	Luca Mozzato	Road cycling	Men's road race	Debut	
Italy	Letizia Paternoster	Track cycling	Women's team pursuit	2nd	
Italy	Letizia Paternoster	Track cycling	Women's omnium	Debut	
Italy	Silvia Persico	Road cycling	Women's road race	Debut	
Italy	Chiara Teocchi	Mountain biking	Women's cross-country	Debut	
Italy	Miriam Vece	Track cycling	Women's sprint	Debut	
Italy	Miriam Vece	Track cycling	Women's keiring	Debut	
Italy	Elia Viviani	Road cycling	Men's road race	2nd	
Italy	Elia Viviani	Track cycling	Men's Madison	2nd	
Italy	Elia Viviani	Track cycling	Men's omnium	4th	
Japan	Yukiya Arashiro	Road cycling	Women's road race	4th	
Japan	Eiya Hashimoto	Track cycling	Men's team pursuit	Debut	
Japan	Sae Hatakeyama	BMX	Women's BMX Racing	2nd	
Japan	Mizuki Ikeda	Track cycling	Women's team pursuit	Debut	
Japan	Shunsuke Imamura	Track cycling	Men's team pursuit	Debut	
Japan	Shunsuke Imamura	Track cycling	Men's Madison	Debut	
Japan	Yumi Kajihara	Track cycling	Women's team pursuit	Debut	
Japan	Yumi Kajihara	Track cycling	Women's omnium	2nd	
Japan	Maho Kakita	Track cycling	Women's team pursuit	Debut	
Japan	Maho Kakita	Track cycling	Women's Madison	Debut	
Japan	Urara Kawaguchi	Mountain biking	Women's cross-country	Debut	
Japan	Kazushige Kuboki	Track cycling	Men's team pursuit	Debut	
Japan	Kazushige Kuboki	Track cycling	Men's Madison	Debut	
Japan	Kazushige Kuboki	Track cycling	Men's omnium	2nd	
Japan	Yoshitaku Nagasako	Track cycling	Men's team sprint	Debut	
Japan	Rim Nakamura	BMX	Men's BMX Freestyle	2nd	
Japan	Shinji Nakano	Track cycling	Men's keirin	Debut	
Japan	Shinji Nakano	Track cycling	Men's team pursuit	Debut	
Japan	Yuta Obara	Track cycling	Men's sprint	Debut	
Japan	Yuta Obara	Track cycling	Men's team sprint	Debut	
Japan	Riyu Ohta	Track cycling	Women's sprint	Debut	
Japan	Riyu Ohta	Track cycling	Women's keirin	Debut	
Japan	Kaiya Ota	Track cycling	Men's sprint	Debut	
Japan	Kaiya Ota	Track cycling	Men's team sprint	Debut	
Japan	Kaiya Ota	Track cycling	Men's keirin	Debut	
Japan	Mina Sato	Track cycling	Women's sprint	Debut	
Japan	Mina Sato	Track cycling	Women's keirin	Debut	
Japan	Tsuyaka Uchino	Track cycling	Women's team pursuit	Debut	
Japan	Tsuyaka Uchino	Track cycling	Women's Madison	Debut	
Japan	Eri Yonamine	Road cycling	Women's road race	3rd	
Kazakhstan	Andrey Chugay	Track cycling	Men's sprint	Debut	
Kazakhstan	Andrey Chugay	Track cycling	Men's keirin	Debut	
Kazakhstan	Yevgeniy Fedorov	Road cycling	Men's time trial	Debut	
Kazakhstan	Yevgeniy Fedorov	Road cycling	Men's road race	Debut	
Kazakhstan	Alexy Lutsenko	Road cycling	Men's road race	2nd	
Latvia	Mārtiņš Blūms	Mountain biking	Men's cross-country	Debut	
Latvia	Anastasia Carbonari	Road cycling	Women's road race	Debut	
Latvia	Kristens Krīgers	BMX	Men's BMX Racing	Debut	
Latvia	Toms Skujiņš	Road cycling	Men's road race	2nd	
Latvia	Veronika Stūriška	BMX	Women's BMX Racing	Debut	
Latvia	Ernests Zēbolds	BMX	Men's BMX Freestyle	Debut	
Liechtenstein	Romano Püntener	Mountain biking	Men's cross-country	Debut	
Lithuania	Olivija Baleišytė	Track cycling	Women's omnium	2nd	
Lithuania	Rasa Leleivytė	Road cycling	Women's road race	2nd	
Lithuania	Vasilijus Lendel	Track cycling	Men's sprint	Debut	
Lithuania	Vasilijus Lendel	Track cycling	Men's keirin	Debut	
Luxembourg	Alex Kirsch	Road cycling	Men's road race	Debut	
Luxembourg	Christine Majerus	Road cycling	Women's road race	4th	
Malaysia	Nurul Izzah Izzati Mohd Asri	Track cycling	Women's sprint	Debut	
Malaysia	Nurul Izzah Izzati Mohd Asri	Track cycling	Women's keirin	Debut	
Malaysia	Azizulhasni Awang	Track cycling	Men's sprint	4th	
Malaysia	Azizulhasni Awang	Track cycling	Men's keirin	5th	
Malaysia	Muhammad Shah Firdaus Sahrom	Track cycling	Men's sprint	2nd	
Malaysia	Muhammad Shah Firdaus Sahrom	Track cycling	Men's keirin	2nd	
Malaysia	Nur Aisyah Mohamad Zubir	Road cycling	Women's road race	Debut	
Mauritius	Aurelie Halbwachs	Mountain biking	Women's cross-country	3rd	
Mauritius	Kimberley Le Court	Road cycling	Women's road race	Debut	
Mauritius	Christopher Rougier-Lagane	Road cycling	Men's road race	Debut	
Mexico	Daniela Gaxiola	Track cycling	Women's sprint	2nd	
Mexico	Daniela Gaxiola	Track cycling	Women's team sprint	2nd	
Mexico	Daniela Gaxiola	Track cycling	Women's keirin	2nd	
Mexico	Ricardo Peña	Track cycling	Men's omnium	Debut	
Mexico	Marcela Prieto	Road cycling	Women's road race	Debut	
Mexico	Adair Prieto	Mountain biking	Men's cross-country	Debut	
Mexico	Jessica Salazar	Track cycling	Women's team sprint	Debut	
Mexico	Érika-Monserrath Rodríguez Suárez	Mountain biking	Women's cross-country	Debut	
Mexico	Victoria Velasco	Track cycling	Women's omnium	Debut	
Mexico	Yuli Verdugo	Track cycling	Women's sprint	2nd	
Mexico	Yuli Verdugo	Track cycling	Women's team sprint	2nd	
Mexico	Yuli Verdugo	Track cycling	Women's keirin	2nd	
Mongolia	Jambaljamts Sainbayar	Road cycling	Men's time trial	Debut	
Mongolia	Jambaljamts Sainbayar	Road cycling	Men's road race	Debut	
Morocco	Achraf Ed Doghmy	Road cycling	Men's time trial	Debut	
Morocco	Achraf Ed Doghmy	Road cycling	Men's road race	Debut	
Morocco	Dean Reeves	BMX	Men's BMX Racing	Debut	
Namibia	Vera Looser	Road cycling	Women's road race	3rd	
Namibia	Alex Miller	Mountain biking	Men's cross-country	2nd	
Netherlands	Jaymio Brink	BMX	Men's BMX Racing	Debut	
Netherlands	Yoeri Havik	Track cycling	Men's Madison	2nd	
Netherlands	Jeffrey Hoogland	Track cycling	Men's sprint	3rd	
Netherlands	Jeffrey Hoogland	Track cycling	Men's team sprint	3rd	
Netherlands	Jeffrey Hoogland	Track cycling	Men's keirin	Debut	
Netherlands	Daan Hoole	Road cycling	Men's time trial	Debut	
Netherlands	Daan Hoole	Road cycling	Men's road race	Debut	
Netherlands	Kyra Lamberink	Track cycling	Women's team sprint	Debut	
Netherlands	Harrie Lavreysen	Track cycling	Men's sprint	2nd	
Netherlands	Harrie Lavreysen	Track cycling	Men's team sprint	2nd	
Netherlands	Harrie Lavreysen	Track cycling	Men's keirin	2nd	
Netherlands	Puck Pieterse	Mountain biking	Women's cross-country	Debut	
Netherlands	Laura Smulders	BMX	Women's BMX Racing	4th	
Netherlands	Merel Smulders	BMX	Women's BMX Racing	2nd	
Netherlands	Anne Terpstra	Mountain biking	Women's cross-country	3rd	
Netherlands	Dylan van Baarle	Road cycling	Men's road race	2nd	
Netherlands	Lisa van Belle	Track cycling	Women's Madison	Debut	
Netherlands	Ellen van Dijk	Road cycling	Women's time trial	3rd	
Netherlands	Ellen van Dijk	Road cycling	Women's road race	3rd	
Netherlands	Jan-Willem van Schip	Track cycling	Men's Madison	2nd	
Netherlands	Jan-Willem van Schip	Track cycling	Men's omnium	2nd	
Netherlands	Hetty van de Wouw	Track cycling	Women's sprint	Debut	
Netherlands	Hetty van de Wouw	Track cycling	Women's team sprint	Debut	
Netherlands	Hetty van de Wouw	Track cycling	Women's keirin	Debut	
Netherlands	Roy van den Berg	Track cycling	Men's team sprint	2nd	
Netherlands	Dave van der Burg	BMX	Men's BMX Racing	Debut	
Netherlands	Maike van der Duin	Track cycling	Women's Madison	Debut	
Netherlands	Maike van der Duin	Track cycling	Women's omnium	Debut	
Netherlands	Steffie van der Peet	Track cycling	Women's sprint	Debut	
Netherlands	Steffie van der Peet	Track cycling	Women's team sprint	Debut	
Netherlands	Steffie van der Peet	Track cycling	Women's keirin	Debut	
Netherlands	Mathieu van der Poel	Road cycling	Men's road race	Debut	
Netherlands	Manon Veenstra	BMX	Women's BMX Racing	Debut	
Netherlands	Demi Vollering	Road cycling	Women's time trial	Debut	
Netherlands	Demi Vollering	Road cycling	Women's road race	2nd	
Netherlands	Marianne Vos	Road cycling	Women's road race	4th	
Netherlands	Lorena Wiebes	Road cycling	Women's road race	Debut	
New Zealand	Ellesse Andrews	Track cycling	Women's sprint	2nd	
New Zealand	Ellesse Andrews	Track cycling	Women's team sprint	Debut	
New Zealand	Ellesse Andrews	Track cycling	Women's keirin	2nd	
New Zealand	Rico Bearman	BMX	Men's BMX Racing	Debut	
New Zealand	Bryony Botha	Track cycling	Women's team pursuit	2nd	
New Zealand	Bryony Botha	Track cycling	Women's Madison	Debut	
New Zealand	Kim Cadzow	Road cycling	Women's time trial	Debut	
New Zealand	Kim Cadzow	Road cycling	Women's road race	Debut	
New Zealand	Sam Dakin	Track cycling	Men's sprint	Debut	
New Zealand	Sam Dakin	Track cycling	Men's keirin	Debut	
New Zealand	Niamh Fisher-Black	Road cycling	Women's road race	Debut	
New Zealand	Shaane Fulton	Track cycling	Women's sprint	Debut	
New Zealand	Shaane Fulton	Track cycling	Women's team sprint	Debut	
New Zealand	Aaron Gate	Track cycling	Men's team pursuit	4th	
New Zealand	Aaron Gate	Track cycling	Men's Madison	Debut	
New Zealand	Aaron Gate	Track cycling	Men's omnium	Debut	
New Zealand	Samuel Gaze	Mountain biking	Men's cross-country	2nd	
New Zealand	Keegan Hornblow	Track cycling	Men's team pursuit	Debut	
New Zealand	Samara Maxwell	Mountain biking	Women's cross-country	Debut	
New Zealand	Rebecca Petch	Track cycling	Women's team sprint	Debut	
New Zealand	Rebecca Petch	Track cycling	Women's keirin	Debut	
New Zealand	Laurence Pithie	Road cycling	Men's time trial	Debut	
New Zealand	Laurence Pithie	Road cycling	Men's road race	Debut	
New Zealand	Tom Sexton	Track cycling	Men's team pursuit	Debut	
New Zealand	Emily Shearman	Track cycling	Women's team pursuit	Debut	
New Zealand	Emily Shearman	Track cycling	Women's Madison	Debut	
New Zealand	Nicole Shields	Track cycling	Women's team pursuit	Debut	
New Zealand	Campbell Stewart	Track cycling	Men's team pursuit	2nd	
New Zealand	Campbell Stewart	Track cycling	Men's Madison	2nd	
New Zealand	Corbin Strong	Road cycling	Men's road race	Debut	
New Zealand	Leila Walker	BMX	Women's BMX Racing	Debut	
New Zealand	Ally Wollaston	Track cycling	Women's team pursuit	Debut	
New Zealand	Ally Wollaston	Track cycling	Women's omnium	Debut	
Nigeria	Ese Ukpeseraye	Road cycling	Women's road race	Debut	
Nigeria	Ese Ukpeseraye	Track cycling	Women's sprint	Debut	
Nigeria	Ese Ukpeseraye	Track cycling	Women's keirin	Debut	
Norway	Marte Berg Edseth	Road cycling	Women's road race	Debut	
Norway	Tobias Foss	Road cycling	Men's time trial	2nd	
Norway	Tobias Foss	Road cycling	Men's road race	2nd	
Norway	Ingvild Gåskjenn	Road cycling	Women's road race	Debut	
Norway	Knut Røhme	Mountain biking	Men's cross-country	Debut	
Norway	Anita Stenberg	Track cycling	Women's omnium	2nd	
Norway	Søren Wærenskjold	Road cycling	Men's time trial	Debut	
Norway	Søren Wærenskjold	Road cycling	Men's road race	Debut	
Panama	Franklin Archibold	Road cycling	Men's road race	Debut	
Poland	Stanisław Aniołkowski	Road cycling	Men's road race	Debut	
Poland	Alan Banaszek	Track cycling	Men's omnium	Debut	
Poland	Paula Gorycka	Mountain biking	Women's cross-country	2nd	
Poland	Marlena Karwacka	Track cycling	Women's sprint	Debut	
Poland	Marlena Karwacka	Track cycling	Women's team sprint	Debut	
Poland	Marlena Karwacka	Track cycling	Women's keirin	Debut	
Poland	Michał Kwiatkowski	Road cycling	Men's road race	2nd	
Poland	Michał Kwiatkowski	Road cycling	Men's time trial	Debut	
Poland	Marta Lach	Road cycling	Women's time trial	Debut	
Poland	Marta Lach	Road cycling	Women's road race	2nd	
Poland	Urszula Łoś	Track cycling	Women's team sprint	2nd	
Poland	Urszula Łoś	Track cycling	Women's keirin	2nd	
Poland	Krzysztof Łukasik	Mountain biking	Men's cross-country	Debut	
Poland	Katarzyna Niewiadoma	Road cycling	Women's road race	3rd	
Poland	Daria Pikulik	Track cycling	Women's Madison	2nd	
Poland	Daria Pikulik	Track cycling	Women's omnium	3rd	
Poland	Wiktoria Pikulik	Track cycling	Women's Madison	2nd	
Poland	Mateusz Rudyk	Track cycling	Men's sprint	2nd	
Poland	Mateusz Rudyk	Track cycling	Men's keirin	2nd	
Poland	Nikola Sibiak	Track cycling	Women's sprint	Debut	
Poland	Nikola Sibiak	Track cycling	Women's team sprint	Debut	
Poland	Agnieszka Skalniak-Sójka	Road cycling	Women's time trial	Debut	
Poland	Agnieszka Skalniak-Sójka	Road cycling	Women's road race	Debut	
Portugal	Daniela Campos	Road cycling	Women's road race	Debut	
Portugal	Rui Costa	Road cycling	Men's time trial	Debut	
Portugal	Rui Costa	Road cycling	Men's road race	3rd	
Portugal	Iúri Leitão	Track cycling	Men's Madison	Debut	
Portugal	Iúri Leitão	Track cycling	Men's omnium	Debut	
Portugal	Maria Martins	Track cycling	Women's omnium	2nd	
Portugal	Nelson Oliveira	Road cycling	Men's time trial	4th	
Portugal	Nelson Oliveira	Road cycling	Men's road race	4th	
Portugal	Rui Oliveira	Track cycling	Men's Madison	Debut	
Portugal	Raquel Queiros	Mountain biking	Women's cross-country	2nd	
Refugee Olympic Team	Amir Ansari	Road cycling	Men's time trial	Debut	
Refugee Olympic Team	Eyeru Gebru	Road cycling	Women's road race	Debut	
Romania	Ede-Károly Molnár	Mountain biking	Men's cross-country	Debut	
Rwanda	Diane Ingabire	Road cycling	Women's time trial	Debut	
Rwanda	Diane Ingabire	Road cycling	Women's road race	Debut	
Rwanda	Eric Manizabayo	Road cycling	Men's road race	Debut	
Rwanda	Jazilla Mwamikazi	Mountain biking	Women's cross-country	Debut	
Serbia	Jelena Erić	Road cycling	Women's road race	Debut	
Serbia	Ognjen Ilić	Road cycling	Men's road race	Debut	
Slovakia	Nora Jenčušová	Road cycling	Women's time trial	Debut	
Slovakia	Nora Jenčušová	Road cycling	Women's road race	Debut	
Slovakia	Lukáš Kubiš	Road cycling	Men's road race	2nd	
Slovenia	Eugenia Bujak	Road cycling	Women's time trial	Debut	
Slovenia	Eugenia Bujak	Road cycling	Women's road race	2nd	
Slovenia	Luka Mezgec	Road cycling	Men's road race	Debut	
Slovenia	Matej Mohorič	Road cycling	Men's road race	2nd	
Slovenia	Domen Novak	Road cycling	Men's road race	Debut	
Slovenia	Urša Pintar	Road cycling	Women's time trial	Debut	
Slovenia	Urša Pintar	Road cycling	Women's road race	Debut	
Slovenia	Jan Tratnik	Road cycling	Men's time trial	Debut	
Slovenia	Jan Tratnik	Road cycling	Men's road race	2nd	
Slovenia	Tanja Žakelj	Mountain biking	Women's cross-country	4th	
South Africa	Ryan Gibbons	Road cycling	Men's road race	2nd	
South Africa	Alan Hatherly	Mountain biking	Men's cross-country	3rd	
South Africa	Tiffany Keep	Road cycling	Women's road race	Debut	
South Africa	Vincent Leygonie	BMX	Men's BMX Freestyle	Debut	
South Africa	Candice Lill	Mountain biking	Women's cross-country	3rd	
South Africa	Miyanda Maseti	BMX	Women's BMX Racing	Debut	
South Africa	Ashleigh Moolman Pasio	Road cycling	Women's road race	4th	
South Africa	Jean Spies	Track cycling	Men's sprint	2nd	
South Africa	Jean Spies	Track cycling	Men's keirin	2nd	
South Korea	Kim Eu-ro	Road cycling	Men's road race	Debut	
South Korea	Song Min-ji	Road cycling	Women's road race	Debut	
Spain	Alex Aranburu	Road cycling	Men's road race	Debut	
Spain	Juan Ayuso	Road cycling	Men's road race	Debut	
Spain	Mireia Benito	Road cycling	Women's time trial	Debut	
Spain	Mireia Benito	Road cycling	Women's road race	Debut	
Spain	Jofre Cullell Estape	Mountain biking	Men's cross-country	2nd	
Spain	Mavi García	Road cycling	Women's road race	2nd	
Spain	Oier Lazkano	Road cycling	Men's time trial	Debut	
Spain	Oier Lazkano	Road cycling	Men's road race	Debut	
Spain	Sebastián Mora	Track cycling	Men's Madison	2nd	
Spain	Albert Torres	Track cycling	Men's Madison	2nd	
Spain	Albert Torres	Track cycling	Men's omnium	2nd	
Spain	David Valero Serrano	Mountain biking	Men's cross-country	3rd	2020 Olympic Bronze Medal
Suriname	Jaïr Tjon En Fa	Track cycling	Men's sprint	2nd	
Suriname	Jaïr Tjon En Fa	Track cycling	Men's keirin	2nd	
Sweden	Caroline Andersson	Road cycling	Women's road race	Debut	
Sweden	Jenny Rissveds	Mountain biking	Women's cross-country	3rd	2016 Olympic Gold Medal
Sweden	Jakob Söderqvist	Road cycling	Men's road race	Debut	
Switzerland	Nadine Aeberhard	BMX	Women's BMX Racing	Debut	
Switzerland	Michelle Andres	Track cycling	Women's Madison	Debut	
Switzerland	Stefan Bissegger	Road cycling	Men's time trial	Debut	
Switzerland	Cédric Butti	BMX	Men's BMX Racing	Debut	
Switzerland	Elise Chabbey	Road cycling	Women's road race	Debut	
Switzerland	Zoé Claessens	BMX	Women's BMX Racing	2nd	
Switzerland	Nikita Ducarroz	BMX	Women's BMX Freestyle	2nd	
Switzerland	Mathias Flückiger	Mountain biking	Men's cross-country	3rd	2020 Olympic Silver Medal
Switzerland	Sina Frei	Mountain biking	Women's cross-country	2nd	2020 Olympic Silver Medal
Switzerland	Elena Hartmann	Road cycling	Women's time trial	Debut	
Switzerland	Elena Hartmann	Road cycling	Women's road race	Debut	
Switzerland	Marc Hirschi	Road cycling	Men's road race	2nd	
Switzerland	Alessandra Keller	Mountain biking	Women's cross-country	Debut	
Switzerland	Stefan Küng	Road cycling	Men's time trial	2nd	
Switzerland	Stefan Küng	Road cycling	Men's road race	2nd	
Switzerland	Simon Marquart	BMX	Men's BMX Racing	2nd	
Switzerland	Noemi Rüegg	Road cycling	Women's road race	Debut	
Switzerland	Nino Schurter	Mountain biking	Men's cross-country	5th	2016 Olympic Gold Medal, 2012 Olympic Silver Medal, 2008 Olympic Bronze Medal
Switzerland	Aline Seitz	Track cycling	Women's Madison	Debut	
Switzerland	Aline Seitz	Track cycling	Women's omnium	Debut	
Switzerland	Alex Vogel	Track cycling	Men's omnium	Debut	
Switzerland	Linda Zanetti	Road cycling	Women's road race	Debut	
Thailand	Jai Angsuthasawit	Track cycling	Men's sprint	2nd	
Thailand	Jai Angsuthasawit	Track cycling	Men's keirin	2nd	
Thailand	Thanakhan Chaiyasombat	Road cycling	Men's road race	Debut	
Thailand	Phetdarin Somrat	Road cycling	Women's time trial	Debut	
Thailand	Phetdarin Somrat	Road cycling	Women's road race	Debut	
Thailand	Komet Sukprasert	BMX	Men's BMX Racing	Debut	
Trinidad and Tobago	Kwesi Browne	Track cycling	Men's sprint	2nd	
Trinidad and Tobago	Kwesi Browne	Track cycling	Men's keirin	2nd	
Trinidad and Tobago	Nicholas Paul	Track cycling	Men's sprint	2nd	
Trinidad and Tobago	Nicholas Paul	Track cycling	Men's keirin	2nd	
Turkey	Burak Abay	Road cycling	Men's road race	Debut	
Uganda	Charles Kagimu	Road cycling	Men's road race	Debut	
Ukraine	Yana Belomoina	Mountain biking	Women's cross-country	4th	
Ukraine	Yuliia Biriukova	Road cycling	Women's time trial	Debut	
Ukraine	Yuliia Biriukova	Road cycling	Women's road race	Debut	
Ukraine	Anatoliy Budyak	Road cycling	Men's road race	2nd	
Ukraine	Oleksandr Hudyma	Mountain biking	Men's cross-country	Debut	
United Arab Emirates	Safia Al-Sayegh	Road cycling	Women's road race	Debut	
United States	Riley Amos	Mountain biking	Men's cross-country	Debut	
United States	Haley Batten	Mountain biking	Women's cross-country	2nd	
United States	Perris Benegas	BMX	Women's BMX Freestyle	2nd	
United States	Christopher Blevins	Mountain biking	Men's cross-country	2nd	
United States	Savilia Blunk	Mountain biking	Women's cross-country	Debut	
United States	Marcus Christopher	BMX	Men's BMX Freestyle	Debut	
United States	Justin Dowell	BMX	Men's BMX Freestyle	2nd	
United States	Chloé Dygert	Road cycling	Women's time trial	2nd	
United States	Chloé Dygert	Road cycling	Women's road race	2nd	
United States	Chloé Dygert	Track cycling	Women's team pursuit	3rd	
United States	Kristen Faulkner	Road cycling	Women's road race	Debut	
United States	Kristen Faulkner	Track cycling	Women's team pursuit	Debut	
United States	Matteo Jorgenson	Road cycling	Men's road race	2nd	
United States	Taylor Knibb	Road cycling	Women's time trial	Debut	
United States	Grant Koontz	Track cycling	Men's omnium	Debut	
United States	Kamren Larsen	BMX	Men's BMX Racing	Debut	
United States	Brandon McNulty	Road cycling	Men's time trial	2nd	
United States	Brandon McNulty	Road cycling	Men's road race	2nd	
United States	Hannah Roberts	BMX	Women's BMX Freestyle	2nd	
United States	Magnus Sheffield	Road cycling	Men's time trial	Debut	
United States	Magnus Sheffield	Road cycling	Men's road race	Debut	
United States	Felicia Stancil	BMX	Women's BMX Racing	2nd	
United States	Jennifer Valente	Track cycling	Women's team pursuit	3rd	
United States	Jennifer Valente	Track cycling	Women's Madison	2nd	
United States	Jennifer Valente	Track cycling	Women's omnium	2nd	
United States	Daleny Vaughn	BMX	Women's BMX Racing	Debut	
United States	Lily Williams	Track cycling	Women's team pursuit	2nd	
United States	Lily Williams	Track cycling	Women's Madison	Debut	
United States	Alise Willoughby	BMX	Women's BMX Racing	4th	
United States	Cameron Wood	BMX	Men's BMX Racing	Debut	
Uruguay	Eric Fagúndez	Road cycling	Men's road race	Debut	
Uzbekistan	Yanina Kuskova	Road cycling	Women's road race	Debut	
Uzbekistan	Nikita Tsvetkov	Road cycling	Men's road race	Debut	
Uzbekistan	Olga Zabelinskaya	Road cycling	Women's time trial	4th	
Uzbekistan	Olga Zabelinskaya	Road cycling	Women's road race	4th	
Venezuela	Orluis Aular	Road cycling	Men's road race	2nd	
Vietnam	Nguyễn Thị Thật	Road cycling	Women's road race	Debut	
