= African BMX Racing Championships =

The African BMX Racing Championships (French : Championnat d'afrique de BMX) is the African top BMX Racing Championships. The first event was held in 2014 at Giba Gorge, KwaZulu-Natal in South Africa. It was held along with the South African BMX National Championship.

It is ruled and managed by the African Cycling Confederation.

In 2025 there were seventy athletes from five countries - Central Africa Republic, Côte d’Ivoire, Egypt, South Africa, and Sudan.

== Editions ==
Year	Host	City
2014	South Africa	Durban
2015	Zimbabwe	Harare
2016	South Africa	Durban
2017	Zimbabwe	Harare
2018	Egypt	Cairo
2019-2021 not held		
2022	Zimbabwe	Bulawayo
2023	Zimbabwe	Bulawayo
2024	Zimbabwe	Bulawayo
2025	Zimbabwe	Harare

== Men's summary ==
=== Elites ===
Year	Gold	Silver	Bronze
2014	(South Africa) Kyle Dodd	(South Africa) Bryce Stiebel	(Zimbabwe) Tawanda Marova
2015	(South Africa) Kyle Dodd	(South Africa) Alex Limberg	(Zimbabwe) Penias Tenthani
2016	(South Africa) Kyle Dodd	(South Africa) Alex Limberg	(South Africa) Miguel Carvalho
2017	(South Africa) Brandon Pratt	(South Africa) Kyle Dodd	(Zimbabwe) Penias Tenthani
2018	(South Africa) Dylan Eggar	(South Africa) Alex Limberg	(South Africa) Brandon Pratt
2019–2021: not held
2022	(South Africa) Tyler Klumper	(South Africa) Alex Whitehead	(Zimbabwe) Joe Ruwoko
2023	(Morocco) Dean Reeves	(South Africa) Manqoba Madida	(South Africa) Brandon Pratt
2024	(Algeria) Joe Chenaf	(South Africa) Alex Whitehead	(Zimbabwe) Simon Martin
2025	(Zimbabwe) Joe Ruwoko	(Zimbabwe) Marlon Kaduku	(Zimbabwe) Tawanda Marova

=== Men's U23 ===
Year	Gold	Silver	Bronze
2023	(Zimbabwe) Gaylord Kaduku	(Zimbabwe) Prosper Tenthani	
2025	(Zimbabwe) Gaylord Kaduku		

=== Juniors ===
Year	Gold	Silver	Bronze
2014	(South Africa) Dylan Whittle	(South Africa) Alex Limberg	(Zimbabwe) Shae Smith
2015	(Zimbabwe) Shae Smith	(South Africa) Tyler Klumper	
2016	(South Africa) Dylan Eggar	(South Africa) Tyler Klumper	(South Africa) Manqoba Madida
2018	(Egypt) Ahmed Clip	(Egypt) Nour Eldin Hussein	(Egypt) Karim Mohammed
2025	(Zimbabwe) Ashton Kaduku		

== Women's summary ==
=== Elites ===
Year	Gold	Silver	Bronze
2014	(South Africa) Stacey Bryant	(South Africa) Paige Muller	
2018	(Sudan) Arafa Hassan	(Sudan) Victoria Abdelkarim	(Egypt) Haggar Elbestawy
2024	(South Africa) Miyanda Maset	(Zimbabwe) Hana Taylor	(South Africa) Kendall Coombes
2025	(South Africa) Miyanda Maseti	(Zimbabwe) Helen Mitchell	(Zimbabwe) Kudakwashe Mswaka

=== Women U23 ===
Year	Gold	Silver	Bronze
2023	(Zimbabwe) Hana Taylor		
2025	(Zimbabwe) Rufaro Tembo	(Zimbabwe) Melisa Pekani	

=== Juniors ===
Year	Gold	Silver	Bronze
2014	(South Africa) Maia Rawlins	(South Africa) Kayla Eggar	(South Africa) Anita Zenani
2018	(Egypt) Alaa Elsayed	(Burundi) Yvonne Iradukunda	(Egypt) Salma Aatia
2023	(South Africa) Miyanda Maseti		
