= Cycling at the 2024 Summer Olympics – Women's keirin =

Women's Keirin at the Games of the XXXIII Olympiad
- Olympic track cycling
- Venues: Vélodrome National de Saint-Quentin-en-Yvelines
- Dates: 7–8 August 2024

Medalists
1st place, gold medalist(s)		Ellesse Andrews	New Zealand
2nd place, silver medalist(s)		Hetty van de Wouw	Netherlands
3rd place, bronze medalist(s)		Emma Finucane	Great Britain

The women's Keirin event at the 2024 Summer Olympics took place on 7 and 8 August 2024 at the Vélodrome National de Saint-Quentin-en-Yvelines.

== Background ==
This was the 4th appearance of the event, which has been held at every Summer Olympics since its introduction in 2012.

== Competition format ==
Keirin races involve up to 7 cyclists each (though the 2020 format has no races with more than 6). The cyclists follow a pace motorcycle for 3 laps (750 m); the motorcycle then pulls away and the cyclists race for another 3 laps. These distances are changed from the 2016 Games, shortening the paced section from 5.5 laps and lengthening the unpaced sprint from 2.5 laps. The motorcycle starts at 30 km/h and increases speed to 50 km/h before it pulls off.

The tournament consists of four main rounds (up from three in 2016) and a repechage:

- First round: Five heats of 6 cyclists each. The top 2 cyclists in each heat (10 total) advance to the second round; all others (20 cyclists) go to the repechage.
- Repechage: Four heats of 5 cyclists each. The top 2 cyclists in each heat (8 total) rejoin the first-round winners in the second round. The other 12 cyclists are eliminated.
- Second round: Three heats of 6 cyclists each. The top 4 cyclists in each heat (12 total) advance to the semifinals. The remaining 6 cyclists are eliminated.
- Semifinals: Two heats of 6 cyclists each. The top 3 cyclists in each semifinal (6 total) advance to Final A; the bottom 3 cyclists from each semifinal go to Final B, out of medal contention.
- Finals: Two finals. Final A consists of the top 6 cyclists, awarding medals and 4th through 6th place. Final B ranks the next 6 cyclists from 7th to 12th.

== Schedule ==
All times are Central European Time (UTC+2)

Date	Time	Round
7 August 2024	13:26; 15:10	First round Repechages
8 August 2024	17:18; 18:15; 19:01	Quarterfinals; Semifinals; Finals

== Results ==
=== First round ===
Heat 1

Rank	Cyclist	Nation	Gap	Notes
1	Ellesse Andrews	New Zealand		QF
2	Mathilde Gros	France	+0.014	QF
3	Katy Marchant	Great Britain	+0.021	R
4	Daniela Gaxiola	Mexico	+0.075	R
5	Urszula Łoś	Poland	+0.261	R
6	Ese Ukpeseraye	Nigeria	+2.129	R

Heat 2

Rank	Cyclist	Nation	Gap	Notes
1	Hetty van de Wouw	Netherlands		QF
2	Yuan Liying	China	+0.108	QF
3	Miriam Vece	Italy	+0.236	R
4	Lauriane Genest	Canada	+0.236	R
5	Riyu Ohta	Japan	+0.381	R
6	Yuli Verdugo	Mexico	+0.381	R

Heat 3

Rank	Cyclist	Nation	Gap	Notes
1	Emma Hinze	Germany		QF
2	Guo Yufang	China	+0.087	QF
3	Marlena Karwacka	Poland	+0.087	R
4	Kristina Clonan	Australia	+0.160	R
5	Julie Nicolaes	Belgium	+0.204	R
6	Martha Bayona	Colombia	+0.266	R

Heat 4

Rank	Cyclist	Nation	Gap	Notes
1	Nicky Degrendele	Belgium		QF
2	Mina Sato	Japan	+0.005	QF
3	Steffie van der Peet	Netherlands	+0.108	R
4	Kelsey Mitchell	Canada	+0.172	R
5	Rebecca Petch	New Zealand	+0.260	R
6	Chloe Moran	Australia	+1.065	R

Heat 5

Rank	Cyclist	Nation	Gap	Notes
1	Emma Finucane	Great Britain		QF
2	Lea Friedrich	Germany	+0.087	QF
3	Taky Marie-Divine Kouamé	France	+0.631	R
4	Nurul Izzah Izzati Mohd Asri	Malaysia	+0.729	R
5	Stefany Cuadrado	Colombia	+0.862	R
6	Sara Fiorin	Italy	+0.960	R

=== Repechages ===
Heat 1

Rank	Cyclist	Nation	Gap	Notes
1	Kelsey Mitchell	Canada		QF
2	Katy Marchant	Great Britain	+0.014	QF
3	Nurul Izzah Izzati Mohd Asri	Malaysia	+0.041	
4	Martha Bayona	Colombia	+0.094	
5	Yuli Verdugo	Mexico	+0.186	

Heat 2

Rank	Cyclist	Nation	Gap	Notes
1	Kristina Clonan	Australia		QF
2	Daniela Gaxiola	Mexico	+0.124	QF
3	Miriam Vece	Italy	+0.180	
4	Stefany Cuadrado	Colombia	+0.305	
5	Urszula Łoś	Poland	+0.971	

Heat 3

Rank	Cyclist	Nation	Gap	Notes
1	Lauriane Genest	Canada		QF
2	Rebecca Petch	New Zealand	+0.042	QF
3	Marlena Karwacka	Poland	+0.338	
4	Chloe Moran	Australia	+0.367	
5	Sara Fiorin	Italy	+0.488	

Heat 4

Rank	Cyclist	Nation	Gap	Notes
1	Riyu Ohta	Japan		QF
2	Steffie van der Peet	Netherlands	+0.028	QF
3	Julie Nicolaes	Belgium	+0.135	
4	Ese Ukpeseraye	Nigeria	+0.584	
5	Taky Marie-Divine Kouamé	France	+0.589	

=== Quarterfinals ===
Heat 1

Rank	Cyclist	Nation	Gap	Notes
1	Lea Friedrich	Germany		SF
2	Ellesse Andrews	New Zealand	+0.020	SF
3	Nicky Degrendele	Belgium	+0.070	SF
4	Steffie van der Peet	Netherlands	+0.127	SF
5	Yuan Liying	China	+0.142	
6	Kristina Clonan	Australia	+0.249	

Heat 2

Rank	Cyclist	Nation	Gap	Notes
1	Hetty van de Wouw	Netherlands		SF
2	Emma Finucane	Great Britain	+0.020	SF
3	Rebecca Petch	New Zealand	+0.105	SF
4	Riyu Ohta	Japan	+0.222	SF
5	Guo Yufang	China	+0.298	
6	Kelsey Mitchell	Canada	+0.341	

Heat 3

Rank	Cyclist	Nation	Gap	Notes
1	Mathilde Gros	France		SF
2	Emma Hinze	Germany	+0.007	SF
3	Katy Marchant	Great Britain	+0.063	SF
4	Daniela Gaxiola	Mexico	+0.138	SF
5	Mina Sato	Japan	+0.164	
6	Lauriane Genest	Canada	+0.271	

=== Semifinals ===
Heat 1

Rank	Cyclist	Nation	Gap	Notes
1	Ellesse Andrews	New Zealand		FA
2	Daniela Gaxiola	Mexico	+0.104	FA
3	Emma Finucane	Great Britain	+0.157	FA
4	Steffie van der Peet	Netherlands	+0.161	FB
5	Rebecca Petch	New Zealand	+0.648	FB
6	Lea Friedrich	Germany	+2.750	FB

Heat 2

Rank	Cyclist	Nation	Gap	Notes
1	Hetty van de Wouw	Netherlands		FA
2	Katy Marchant	Great Britain	+0.056	FA
3	Emma Hinze	Germany	+0.101	FA
4	Nicky Degrendele	Belgium	+0.114	FB
5	Mathilde Gros	France	+0.301	FB
6	Riyu Ohta	Japan	+0.592	FB

=== Finals ===
==== Final A ====
Rank	Cyclist	Nation	Gap	Notes
1st place, gold medalist(s)	Ellesse Andrews	New Zealand		
2nd place, silver medalist(s)	Hetty van de Wouw	Netherlands	+0.062	
3rd place, bronze medalist(s)	Emma Finucane	Great Britain	+0.092	
4	Katy Marchant	Great Britain	+0.181	
5	Emma Hinze	Germany	+0.280	
6	Daniela Gaxiola	Mexico	+0.457	

==== Final B ====
Rank	Cyclist	Nation	Gap	Notes
7	Lea Friedrich	Germany		
8	Mathilde Gros	France	+0.087	
9	Riyu Ohta	Japan	+0.144	
10	Steffie van der Peet	Netherlands	+0.167	
11	Nicky Degrendele	Belgium	+0.202	
12	Rebecca Petch	New Zealand	+0.712	
