= Cycling at the 2024 Summer Olympics – Women's sprint =

Women's sprint at the Games of the XXXIII Olympiad
- Olympic track cycling
- Venues: Vélodrome National de Saint-Quentin-en-Yvelines
- Dates: 9–11 August 2024
- Competitors: 28 from 16 nations

Medalists
1st place, gold medalist(s)		Ellesse Andrews	New Zealand
2nd place, silver medalist(s)		Lea Friedrich	Germany
3rd place, bronze medalist(s)		Emma Finucane	Great Britain

The women's sprint event at the 2024 Summer Olympics took place from 9 to 11 August 2024 at the Vélodrome National de Saint-Quentin-en-Yvelines.

== Background ==
This was the 10th appearance of the event, which has been held at every Summer Olympics since 1988.

== Competition format ==
The women's track sprint competition encompasses a qualifying round followed by a series of knockout and repechage rounds.

The qualifying round consists of each rider completing three laps in turn with their time taken from their final lap. The top 24 riders progress to the 1/32 finals.

The subsequent rounds are organised as follows:

- 1/32 finals: The top 24 riders are split into 12 head-to-head sprints based on qualifying time i.e. the fastest rider faces the 24th rider, 2nd faces 23rd etc. The winners progress to the 1/16 finals. The losers ride in the 1/32 repechage.
- 1/32 repechage: The 12 losers from the 1/32 finals face off in four heats of three riders. The winners progress to the 1/16 finals. The losers are out of the competition.
- 1/16 finals: The 12 winners from the 1/32 finals and the four repechage winners compete in eight head-to-head races. The eight winners progress to the 1/8 finals. The eight losers ride in the 1/16 repechage,
- 1/16 repechage: The eight losing riders from the 1/16 finals face off in four head-to-head heats. The four winners progress to the 1/8 finals. The losers are out of the competition.
- 1/8 finals: The eight winners from the 1/16 finals plus the four winners from the 1/16 repechage race in six head-to-head heats. The winners progress to the 1/4 finals. The losers ride in the 1/8 repechage.
- 1/8 repechage: The six losers from the 1/8 finals face off in two heats of three riders. The two winners progress to the 1/4 finals. The four losers are out of the competition.
- 1/4 finals to the final: The remaining eight riders compete in a regular knockout process, each round being a best of three race. The losers of the quarter finals are out of the competition. The losers of the semi finals race for Bronze. The winners of the semi finals race for Gold and Silver.

== Schedule ==
All times are Central European Time (UTC+2)

Date	Time	Round
9 August 2024	14:00; 14:48; 15:38; 19:10; 19:58	Qualifying; 1/32 finals 1/32 finals repechages 1/16 finals 1/16 finals repechages
10 August 2024	17:00; 17:50; 19:07	1/8 finals 1/8 finals repechages Quarterfinals
11 August 2024	11:22; 12:25; 12:45	Semifinals; Classification 5–8; Final

== Results ==
=== Qualifying ===
Rank	Cyclist	Nation	Time	Behind	Notes
1	Lea Friedrich	Germany	10.029		Q, WR
2	Emma Finucane	Great Britain	10.067	+0.038	Q
3	Ellesse Andrews	New Zealand	10.108	+0.079	Q
4	Sophie Capewell	Great Britain	10.132	+0.103	Q
5	Mathilde Gros	France	10.182	+0.153	Q
6	Emma Hinze	Germany	10.198	+0.169	Q
7	Mina Sato	Japan	10.257	+0.228	Q
8	Hetty van de Wouw	Netherlands	10.263	+0.234	Q
9	Shaane Fulton	New Zealand	10.281	+0.252	Q
10	Kelsey Mitchell	Canada	10.285	+0.256	Q
11	Kristina Clonan	Australia	10.310	+0.281	Q
12	Lauriane Genest	Canada	10.310	+0.281	Q
13	Martha Bayona	Colombia	10.411	+0.382	Q
14	Steffie van der Peet	Netherlands	10.479	+0.450	Q
15	Stefany Cuadrado	Colombia	10.508	+0.479	Q, JWR
16	Miriam Vece	Italy	10.560	+0.531	Q
17	Daniela Gaxiola	Mexico	10.581	+0.552	Q
18	Taky Marie-Divine Kouamé	France	10.634	+0.605	Q
19	Yuli Verdugo	Mexico	10.637	+0.608	Q
20	Riyu Ohta	Japan	10.659	+0.63	Q
21	Nurul Izzah Izzati Mohd Asri	Malaysia	10.709	+0.680	Q
22	Bao Shanju	China	10.744	+0.715	Q
23	Marlena Karwacka	Poland	10.758	+0.729	Q
24	Julie Nicolaes	Belgium	10.809	+0.780	Q
25	Nikola Sibiak	Poland	10.945	+0.916	
26	Sara Fiorin	Italy	11.085	+1.056	
27	Chloe Moran	Australia	11.112	+1.083	
28	Ese Ukpeseraye	Nigeria	11.652	+1.623	
	Yuan Liying	China	Did not start		
	Nicky Degrendele	Belgium	Did not start		

=== 1/32 finals ===
Heat	Rank	Cyclist	Nation	Gap	Notes
1	1	Lea Friedrich	Germany	X	Q
1	2	Julie Nicolaes	Belgium	+1.015	R
2	1	Emma Finucane	Great Britain	X	Q
2	2	Marlena Karwacka	Poland	+0.632	R
3	1	Ellesse Andrews	New Zealand	X	Q
3	2	Bao Shanju	China	+0.312	R
4	1	Sophie Capewell	Great Britain	X	Q
4	2	Nurul Izzah Izzati Mohd Asri	Malaysia	+0.081	R
5	1	Mathilde Gros	France	X	Q
5	2	Riyu Ohta	Japan	+0.201	R
6	1	Emma Hinze	Germany	X	Q
6	2	Yuli Verdugo	Mexico	+0.119	R
7	1	Mina Sato	Japan	X	Q
7	2	Taky Marie-Divine Kouamé	France	+0.112	R
8	1	Hetty van de Wouw	Netherlands	X	Q
8	2	Daniela Gaxiola	Mexico	+0.187	R
9	1	Shaane Fulton	New Zealand	X	Q
9	2	Miriam Vece	Italy	+0.250	R
10	1	Kelsey Mitchell	Canada	X	Q
10	2	Stefany Cuadrado	Colombia	+0.378	R
11	1	Kristina Clonan	Australia	X	Q
11	2	Steffie van der Peet	Netherlands	+0.100	R
12	1	Martha Bayona	Colombia	X	Q
12	2	Lauriane Genest	Canada	+0.064	R

=== 1/32 finals repechages ===
Heat	Rank	Cyclist	Nation	Gap	Notes
1	1	Daniela Gaxiola	Mexico	X	Q
1	2	Miriam Vece	Italy	+0.004	
1	3	Julie Nicolaes	Belgium	+0.509	
2	1	Taky Marie-Divine Kouamé	France	X	Q
2	2	Marlena Karwacka	Poland	+0.065	
2	3	Stefany Cuadrado	Colombia	+1.258	
3	1	Steffie van der Peet	Netherlands	X	Q
3	2	Yuli Verdugo	Mexico	+0.001	
3	3	Bao Shanju	China	+0.127	
4	1	Lauriane Genest	Canada	X	Q
4	2	Nurul Izzah Izzati Mohd Asri	Malaysia	+0.059	
4	3	Riyu Ohta	Japan	+0.326	

=== 1/16 finals ===
Heat	Rank	Cyclist	Nation	Gap	Notes
1	1	Lea Friedrich	Germany	X	Q
1	2	Lauriane Genest	Canada	+0.220	R
2	1	Emma Finucane	Great Britain	X	Q
2	2	Steffie van der Peet	Netherlands	+0.127	R
3	1	Ellesse Andrews	New Zealand	X	Q
3	2	Taky Marie-Divine Kouamé	France	+0.146	R
4	1	Sophie Capewell	Great Britain	X	Q
4	2	Daniela Gaxiola	Mexico	+0.077	R
5	1	Mathilde Gros	France	X	Q
5	2	Martha Bayona	Colombia	+0.016	R
6	1	Emma Hinze	Germany	X	Q
6	2	Kristina Clonan	Australia	+0.087	R
7	1	Mina Sato	Japan	X	Q
7	2	Kelsey Mitchell	Canada	+0.042	R
8	1	Hetty van de Wouw	Netherlands	X	Q
8	2	Shaane Fulton	New Zealand	+0.001	R

=== 1/16 finals repechages ===
Heat	Rank	Cyclist	Nation	Gap	Notes
1	1	Shaane Fulton	New Zealand	X	Q
1	2	Lauriane Genest	Canada	+0.179	
2	1	Kelsey Mitchell	Canada	X	Q
2	2	Steffie van der Peet	Netherlands	+0.070	
3	1	Kristina Clonan	Australia	X	Q
3	2	Taky Marie-Divine Kouamé	France	+0.860	
4	1	Martha Bayona	Colombia	X	Q
4	2	Daniela Gaxiola	Mexico	+0.131	

=== 1/8 finals ===
Heat	Rank	Cyclist	Nation	Gap	Notes
1	1	Lea Friedrich	Germany	X	Q
1	2	Martha Bayona	Colombia	+0.091	R
2	1	Emma Finucane	Great Britain	X	Q
2	2	Kristina Clonan	Australia	+0.658	R
3	1	Ellesse Andrews	New Zealand	X	Q
3	2	Kelsey Mitchell	Canada	+0.116	R
4	1	Sophie Capewell	Great Britain	X	Q
4	2	Shaane Fulton	New Zealand	+0.004	R
5	1	Hetty van de Wouw	Netherlands	X	Q
5	2	Mathilde Gros	France	+0.245	R
6	1	Emma Hinze	Germany	X	Q
6	2	Mina Sato	Japan	+0.032	R

=== 1/8 finals repechages ===
Heat	Rank	Cyclist	Nation	Gap	Notes
1	1	Martha Bayona	Colombia	X	Q
1	2	Mathilde Gros	France	+0.027	
1	3	Shaane Fulton	New Zealand	+0.276	
2	1	Kelsey Mitchell	Canada	X	Q
2	2	Mina Sato	Japan	+0.111	
2	3	Kristina Clonan	Australia	+0.295	

=== Quarterfinals ===
Heat	Rank	Cyclist	Nation	Race 1	Race 2	Decider (i.r.)	Notes
1	1	Lea Friedrich	Germany	X	X		Q
1	2	Kelsey Mitchell	Canada	+0.217	+0.052		F5-8
2	1	Emma Finucane	Great Britain	X	X		Q
2	2	Martha Bayona	Colombia	+0.076	+0.147		F5-8
3	1	Ellesse Andrews	New Zealand	X	X		Q
3	2	Emma Hinze	Germany	+0.048	+0.036		F5-8
4	1	Hetty van de Wouw	Netherlands	X	X		Q
4	2	Sophie Capewell	Great Britain	+0.088	+0.140		F5-8

=== Classification 5–8 ===
Rank	Cyclist	Nation	Gap
5	Sophie Capewell	Great Britain	
6	Emma Hinze	Germany	+0.064
7	Martha Bayona	Colombia	+0.092
8	Kelsey Mitchell	Canada	+0.493

=== Semifinals ===
Heat	Rank	Cyclist	Nation	Race 1	Race 2	Decider (i.r.)	Notes
1	1	Lea Friedrich	Germany	+0.014	X	X	QG
1	2	Hetty van de Wouw	Netherlands	X	+0.053	+0.151	QB
2	1	Ellesse Andrews	New Zealand	X	X		QG
2	2	Emma Finucane	Great Britain	+0.096	+0.050		QB

=== Finals ===
Rank	Cyclist	Nation	Race 1	Race 2	Decider (i.r.)
Gold medal final
1st place, gold medalist(s)	Ellesse Andrews	New Zealand	X	X	
2nd place, silver medalist(s)	Lea Friedrich	Germany	+0.095	+0.624	
Bronze medal final
3rd place, bronze medalist(s)	Emma Finucane	Great Britain	X	X	
4	Hetty van de Wouw	Netherlands	+0.237	+0.160	
