= Alex Limberg =

South African cyclist (born 1996)

Alex Limberg (born 27 November 1996 in Cape Town) is a South African BMX track cyclist who competes in BMX track racing. He currently holds the title as the 2020 South African Elite National BMX Champion.

Limberg's family relocated to Johannesburg when he was 9 years old. He was introduced to BMX track racing as his family settled near the Alrode BMX track which soon became his club and home track. In 2014 he participated in the Youth Olympic Games in China where he ranked 4th in the BMX finals. In 2018 he was runner up at the African BMX Racing Championships. In May 2021 his selection as part of the South African Olympic team was confirmed for the delayed 2020 Summer Games where his performance placed him 6th in the quarter-finals.

Limberg also qualified and was selected to represent South Africa at the 2021 UCI BMX World Championships in August 2021 in the Netherlands.

Limberg wears the number 950 on his number plate and currently lives and trains in Texas, USA.
