= Dean Reeves =

Moroccan BMX racer

Personal information
- Born: 21 December 1995 (age 30)

Cycling career
- Sport: Cycling
- Discipline: BMX racing
Medal record
Men's BMX racing
Representing Morocco
African Championships
Gold medal – first place	2023 Bulawayo	BMX racing

Dean Reeves (born 21 December 1995) is a Moroccan BMX racer. He competed in the men's BMX racing event at the 2024 Summer Olympics.
