= Sara Fiorin =

Italian cyclist

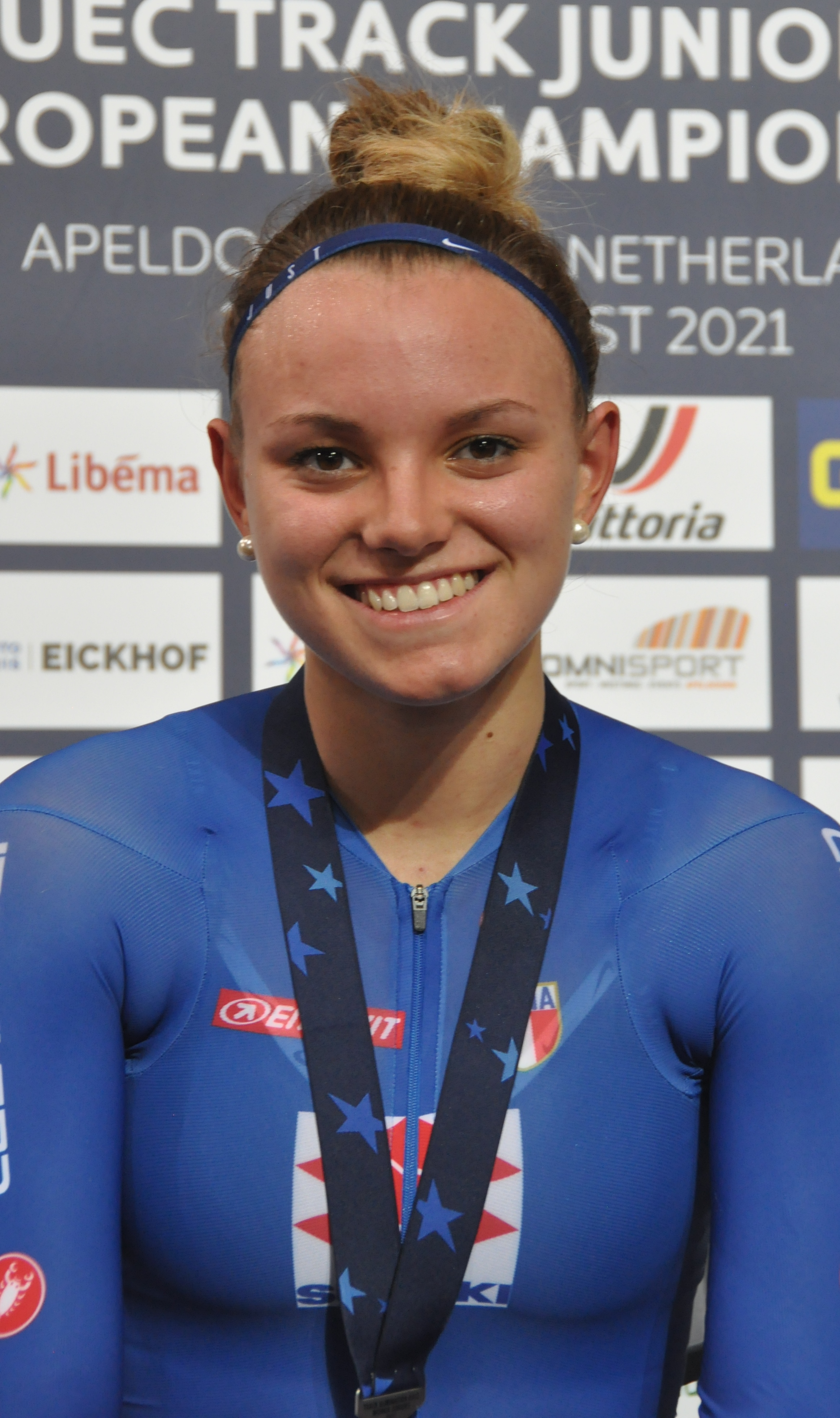
- Fiorin in 2021

Personal information
- Born: 24 September 2003 (age 23) Seveso, Italy

Cycling career
- Sport: Cycling
- Current team: Ceratizit Pro Cycling
- Disciplines: Track; Road; Cyclo-cross

Amateur team
- 2022: Team Gauss Fiorin

Professional teams
- 2023–2024: UAE Development Team
- 2025–: Ceratizit Pro Cycling
Medal record
Women's track cycling
Representing Italy
World Junior Championships
Bronze medal – third place	2021 Cairo	Team sprint
European U23 Championships
Silver medal – second place	2025 Anadia	Scratch
Bronze medal – third place	2023 Anadia	Team pursuit
Bronze medal – third place	2024 Cottbus	Team pursuit
European Junior Championships
Silver medal – second place	2020 Fiorenzuola d'Arda	Team sprint
Bronze medal – third place	2021 Apeldoorn	Elimination race

Sara Fiorin (born 24 September 2003) is an Italian cyclist, who currently rides for UCI Women's WorldTeam Ceratizit Pro Cycling. She competed in the women's sprint and women's keirin events at the 2024 Summer Olympics.

== Major results ==
=== Road ===
2022
3rd Overall Giro Mediterraneo in Rosa
6th Overall Giro delle Marche in Rosa
2023
1st Stage 1 Giro Mediterraneo in Rosa
6th GP Liberazione
2024
1st Umag Trophy Ladies
1st Omloop der Kempen Ladies
3rd GP Mazda Schelkens
5th Arnhem–Veenendaal Classic
5th GP Eco-Struct
5th Konvert Koerse
7th Cyclis Classic
2025
4th Ronde de Mouscron
