= Julie Nicolaes =

Belgian cyclist

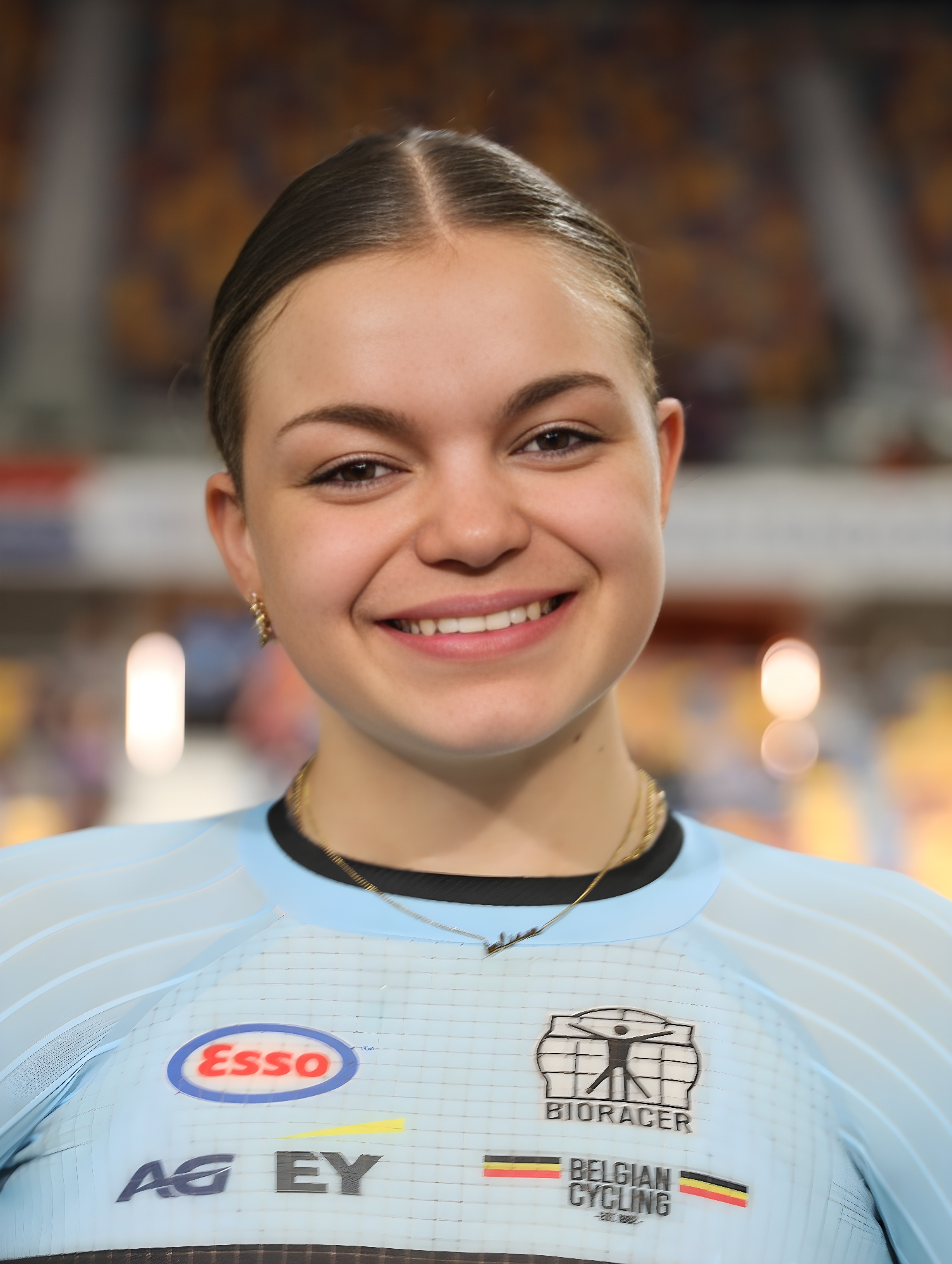
- Nicolaes in 2024

Personal information
- Born: 1 January 2004 (age 22) Boorsem, Belgium

Cycling career
- Sport: Cycling
- Discipline: Track

Professional team
- 2023–: Lotto Dstny Ladies
Medal record
Women's track cycling
Representing Belgium
World Junior Championships
Bronze medal – third place	2022 Tel Aviv	Sprint
Bronze medal – third place	2022 Tel Aviv	Time trial
European U23 Championships
Silver medal – second place	2023 Anadia	Time trial
European Junior Championships
Silver medal – second place	2022 Anadia	Time trial
Bronze medal – third place	2022 Anadia	Sprint

Julie Nicolaes (born 1 January 2004) is a Belgian cyclist. She competed in the women's sprint and keirin events at the 2024 Summer Olympics.

== Career ==
Nicolaes started BMX racing at the age of eight and switched seven years later to Track cycling after attending initiation lessons organised by Cycling Vlaanderen. National success came quickly: in December 2019, she became Belgian keirin, sprint and 500 m time trial youth champion. And at the age of 18, she won the national track titles in the sprint, keirin and 500 m time trial at the Belgium championships for juniors.

In July 2022, she won her first international championship medals at the 2022 UEC European Track Championships (under-23 & junior) in Anadia, Portugal winning the silver in the junior's 500 m time trial and the bronze in the junior's sprint. A month later, she followed that up with bronze medals at the 2022 UCI Junior Track Cycling World Championships in Tel Aviv, Israel in the 500 m time trial and sprint.

A year later, in July 2023, she won another silver at the 2023 UEC European Track Championships (under-23 & junior) in Anadia, Portugal finishing runner-up in the under-23 500 m time trial. At the end of that year, she won her first national title for elite rider, winning the 500 m time trial.

In July 2024 Belgian Cycling selected Nicolaes for the 2024 Summer Olympics in Paris, France as Belgium sent for the first time ever two female riders to the Olympic sprint tournament. At the Olympics, she finished joint 19th in the women's keirin and 24th in the women's sprint.

== Personal life ==
Nicolaes' father, grandfather and great-grandfather were all cyclists. Her grandfather opened a bike shop, now run by her father Johan (Cycling Nicolaes in Lanaken). Her father is also a freelance mechanic with Belgium's Lotto Cycling Team. From 2021 onwards, she attended the Topsportschool in Ghent, Belgium where she studies business management.
