= Miyanda Maseti =

South African BMX rider (born 2005)

Personal information
- Born: 26 July 2005 (age 21)

Cycling career
- Sport: Cycling
- Discipline: BMX racing
Medal record
Representing South Africa
Women's BMX racing
African Continental Championships
Gold medal – first place	2024 Bulawayo	BMX racing

Miyanda Maseti (born 26 July 2005) is a South African BMX racer. A multiple-time national champion and African Continental Champion, she was selected for the 2024 Summer Olympics, the first black woman to represent South African cycling at the Olympics.

== Career ==
From Johannesburg, she started BMX racing when she was four years-old. She is a multiple-time South African national champion. She claimed a sixth national title in 2024. She won the African Continental Championships in Bulawayo, Zimbabwe, to secure a place at the 2024 Summer Olympics.

With her selection, she became the first black woman to represent South African cycling at the Olympic Games.
