= Ese Ukpeseraye =

Nigerian cyclist (born 1999)

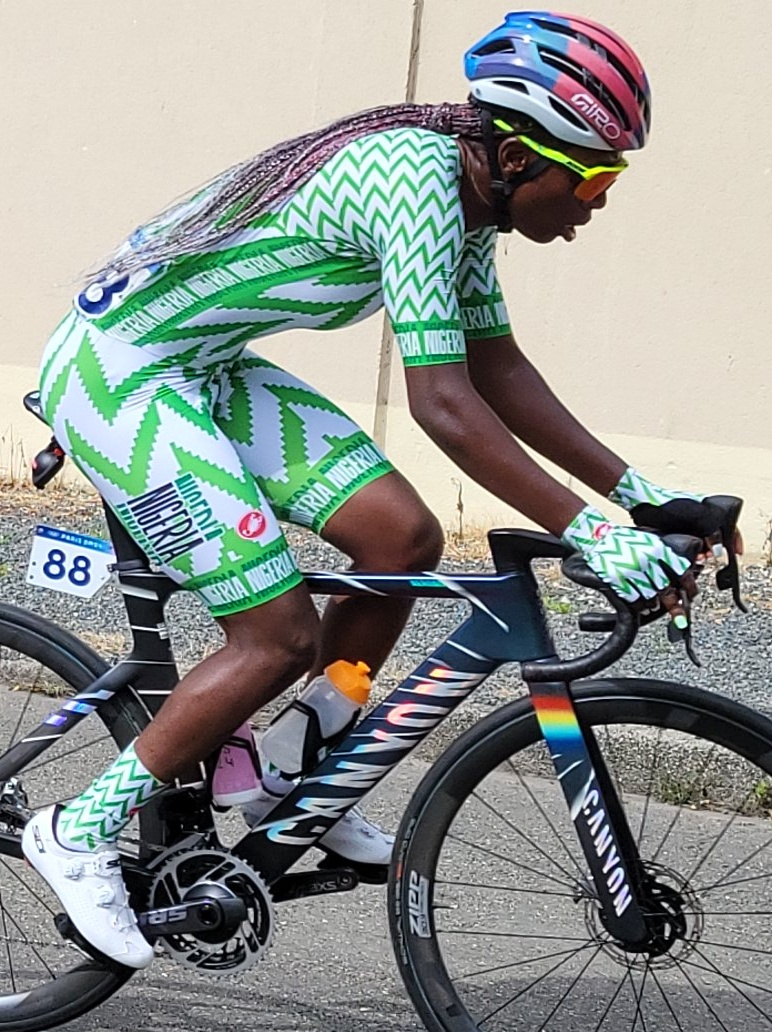
- Ukpeseraye at the 2024 Summer Olympics

Personal information
- Full name: Ese Lovina Ukpeseraye
- Born: 21 March 1999 (age 27)

Cycling career
- Sport: Cycling
- Current team: Canyon–SRAM Generation
- Disciplines: Road; Track
- Role: Rider

Professional team
- 2024–: Canyon–SRAM Generation

Ese Lovina Ukpeseraye (born 21 March 1999) is a Nigerian road and track cyclist, who currently rides for UCI Women's Continental Team Canyon–SRAM Generation. She has won multiple gold medals at the African track cycling championships, as well as in the road race at the 2023 African Road Championships. She also competed at the 2021 and 2023 UCI Track Cycling World Championships.

In 2024, she was selected to compete in the road race at the Summer Olympics, but did not finish.

== Major results ==
=== Road ===
2018
2nd Africa Cup
10th Time trial, African Road Championships
2021
9th Time trial, African Road Championships
2023
1st Road race, African Road Championships
1st Road race, National Championships
2024
African Games

2nd Time trial
3rd Road race
