= 2025 South American U-20 Championship squads =

The 2025 South American U-20 Championship was an international football tournament held in Venezuela from 23 January to 16 February 2025. The ten national teams involved in the tournament were required to register a squad of a minimum of 19 and a maximum of 23 players, including at least three goalkeepers (Regulations Article 49). Only players in these squads are eligible to take part in the tournament. The tournament exclusively requires players to be born between 1 January 2005 and 31 December 2009 to be eligible, i.e. they must be a maximum of 20 years old and at least 16 years old by the end of the calendar year in which the competition is played (Regulations Article 47).

Each national team had to register its list of up to 23 players in the COMET system and then submit it to CONMEBOL by 7 January 2025, 18:00 PYT (UTC−3) (Regulations Articles 50 and 51). Teams are only permitted to make player replacements in cases of serious injuries or illness up to 24 hours before the start of the tournament (Regulations Article 58). Teams are also permitted to replace an injured goalkeeper with another at any time during the tournament (Regulations Article 59). All the substitutions must have the approval of the CONMEBOL Medical Commission.

The final rosters were published by CONMEBOL on 20 January 2025.

The age listed for each player is as of 23 January 2025, the first day of the tournament. A flag is included for coaches who are of a different nationality than their own national team. Players name marked in bold have been capped at full international level.

== Group A ==
=== Venezuela ===
Venezuela announced their 23-man squad on 20 January 2025.

Head coach: (Argentina) Ricardo Valiño

| No. | Pos. | Player | Date of birth (age) | Club |
|---|---|---|---|---|
| 1 | GK | Pedro Fulco | 26 January 2005 (aged 19) | (Venezuelan Football Federation) Academia Puerto Cabello |
| 2 | DF | Víctor Fung | 13 August 2007 (aged 17) | (United States Soccer Federation) Inter Miami CF |
| 3 | DF | **Alessandro Milani** | 14 June 2005 (aged 19) | (Italian Football Federation) Lazio |
| 4 | DF | Yiandro Raap | 25 July 2006 (aged 18) | (Royal Dutch Football Association) PSV Eindhoven |
| 5 | MF | Daniele Quieto | 22 October 2005 (aged 19) | (Italian Football Federation) Inter Milan |
| 6 | DF | Bianneider Tamayo | 12 January 2005 (aged 20) | (Football Federation of Chile) Universidad Católica |
| 7 | MF | Sebastián Castillo | 6 May 2005 (aged 19) | (Venezuelan Football Federation) Deportivo La Guaira |
| 8 | MF | Nicola Profeta | 27 February 2006 (aged 18) | (Brazilian Football Confederation) Santos |
| 9 | FW | Loureins Martínez | 16 April 2005 (aged 19) | (Venezuelan Football Federation) Carabobo |
| 10 | MF | **Kervin Andrade** | 13 April 2005 (aged 19) | (Brazilian Football Confederation) Fortaleza |
| 11 | MF | Leandro Rodríguez | 11 June 2005 (aged 19) | (Venezuelan Football Federation) Monagas |
| 12 | GK | Samuel Aspajo | 24 May 2005 (aged 19) | (Venezuelan Football Federation) Metropolitanos |
| 13 | DF | **Luis Balbo** | 28 March 2006 (aged 18) | (Italian Football Federation) Fiorentina |
| 14 | DF | Yulwuis Pérez | 19 September 2005 (aged 19) | (Venezuelan Football Federation) Monagas |
| 15 | DF | Edicson Tamiche | 28 May 2005 (aged 19) | (Venezuelan Football Federation) Deportivo Táchira |
| 16 | MF | Giovanny Sequera | 14 February 2006 (aged 18) | (United States Soccer Federation) Philadelphia Union |
| 17 | DF | Juan Sánchez | 6 October 2005 (aged 19) | (Venezuelan Football Federation) Deportivo Táchira |
| 18 | FW | Alejandro Cichero | 11 July 2006 (aged 18) | (Italian Football Federation) Frosinone |
| 19 | DF | Javier Suárez | 4 May 2006 (aged 18) | (Mexican Football Federation) Cruz Azul |
| 20 | MF | Leenhan Romero | 1 November 2006 (aged 18) | (Football Federation of Chile) Universidad Católica |
| 21 | FW | Jesús Duarte | 20 December 2005 (aged 19) | (Venezuelan Football Federation) Deportivo Táchira |
| 22 | MF | Miguel Vegas | 22 May 2006 (aged 18) | (Venezuelan Football Federation) Caracas |
| 23 | GK | Juan Vegas | 11 February 2005 (aged 19) | (Venezuelan Football Federation) Caracas |

=== Uruguay ===
Uruguay announced their 23-man squad on 7 January 2025.

Head coach: Fabián Coito

| No. | Pos. | Player | Date of birth (age) | Club |
|---|---|---|---|---|
| 1 | GK | Kevin Martínez | 27 November 2005 (aged 19) | (Uruguayan Football Association) Danubio |
| 2 | DF | Nicolás Ramos | 1 April 2005 (aged 19) | (Uruguayan Football Association) Nacional |
| 3 | DF | Paolo Calione | 22 May 2006 (aged 18) | (Uruguayan Football Association) Nacional |
| 4 | DF | Lucas Agazzi | 2 May 2005 (aged 19) | (Uruguayan Football Association) Defensor Sporting |
| 5 | DF | Juan Rodríguez | 30 May 2005 (aged 19) | (Uruguayan Football Association) Peñarol |
| 6 | DF | Patricio Pacífico | 8 April 2006 (aged 18) | (Uruguayan Football Association) Defensor Sporting |
| 7 | FW | Joaquín Lavega (captain) | 3 February 2005 (aged 19) | (Brazilian Football Confederation) Fluminense |
| 8 | MF | Thiago Helguera | 26 March 2006 (aged 18) | (Portuguese Football Federation) Braga |
| 9 | FW | Renzo Machado | 21 September 2005 (aged 19) | (Uruguayan Football Association) Liverpool |
| 10 | FW | Gonzalo Petit | 21 September 2006 (aged 18) | (Uruguayan Football Association) Nacional |
| 11 | MF | Agustín Albarracín | 29 August 2005 (aged 19) | (Uruguayan Football Association) Boston River |
| 12 | GK | Federico Bonilla | 8 December 2005 (aged 19) | (Uruguayan Football Association) Nacional |
| 13 | DF | Facundo González | 10 April 2005 (aged 19) | (Uruguayan Football Association) Nacional |
| 14 | MF | Mateo Peralta | 8 April 2006 (aged 18) | (Uruguayan Football Association) Danubio |
| 15 | DF | Alfonso Montero | 23 February 2007 (aged 17) | (Italian Football Federation) Juventus |
| 16 | MF | Erico Cuello | 25 May 2005 (aged 19) | (Uruguayan Football Association) Defensor Sporting |
| 17 | MF | Mauro Zalazar | 13 April 2005 (aged 19) | (German Football Association) Schalke 04 |
| 18 | MF | Germán Barbas | 17 September 2007 (aged 17) | (Uruguayan Football Association) Peñarol |
| 19 | FW | Esteban Crucci | 5 July 2006 (aged 18) | (Uruguayan Football Association) Montevideo Wanderers |
| 20 | MF | Lucas Pino | 30 October 2005 (aged 19) | (Uruguayan Football Association) Montevideo City Torque |
| 21 | MF | Alejandro Severo | 27 August 2005 (aged 19) | (Uruguayan Football Association) Racing |
| 22 | MF | Bruno Calcagno | 2 April 2005 (aged 19) | (Royal Spanish Football Federation) Palencia |
| 23 | GK | Felipe Ortiz | 6 November 2007 (aged 17) | (Uruguayan Football Association) Deportivo Maldonado |

=== Paraguay ===
Paraguay announced their 23-man squad on 8 January 2025. On 14 January 2025, forward Ezequiel González was replaced by David Fernández due to an injury.

Head coach: (Argentina) Aldo Duscher

| No. | Pos. | Player | Date of birth (age) | Club |
|---|---|---|---|---|
| 1 | GK | Facundo Insfrán | 4 May 2006 (aged 18) | (Paraguayan Football Association) Olimpia |
| 2 | DF | Matías Argüello | 1 February 2005 (aged 19) | (Paraguayan Football Association) Olimpia |
| 3 | DF | Axel Balbuena | 10 March 2006 (aged 18) | (Argentine Football Association) Lanús |
| 4 | DF | **Diego León** | 3 April 2007 (aged 17) | (Paraguayan Football Association) Cerro Porteño |
| 5 | DF | Lucas Quintana (captain) | 2 January 2005 (aged 20) | (Paraguayan Football Association) Cerro Porteño |
| 6 | MF | Ángel Aguayo | 30 May 2006 (aged 18) | (Paraguayan Football Association) Sol de América |
| 7 | FW | Gabriel Aguayo | 10 February 2005 (aged 19) | (Paraguayan Football Association) Cerro Porteño |
| 8 | MF | Santiago Puzzo | 30 June 2006 (aged 18) | (Argentine Football Association) Talleres (C) |
| 9 | FW | Tiago Caballero | 27 May 2005 (aged 19) | (Paraguayan Football Association) Nacional |
| 10 | MF | Luca Kmet | 20 July 2005 (aged 19) | (Argentine Football Association) Lanús |
| 11 | FW | César Miño | 31 May 2007 (aged 17) | (Paraguayan Football Association) Guaraní |
| 12 | GK | Víctor Rojas | 1 February 2005 (aged 19) | (Paraguayan Football Association) Libertad |
| 13 | DF | Diego Ramos | 9 October 2005 (aged 19) | (Paraguayan Football Association) Guaraní |
| 14 | DF | Tobías Morinigo | 22 September 2005 (aged 19) | (Paraguayan Football Association) Olimpia |
| 15 | DF | Gadiel Paoli | 1 October 2005 (aged 19) | (Argentine Football Association) Boca Juniors |
| 16 | MF | Lucas Gómez | 23 April 2005 (aged 19) | (Paraguayan Football Association) Guaraní |
| 17 | FW | Alexis Fretes | 25 September 2005 (aged 19) | (Paraguayan Football Association) Libertad |
| 18 | MF | Lucas Guiñazú | 25 August 2006 (aged 16) | (Paraguayan Football Association) Libertad |
| 19 | FW | David Fernández | 5 January 2006 (aged 19) | (Paraguayan Football Association) Sol de América |
| 20 | DF | Maximiliano Duarte | 2 September 2006 (aged 18) | (Argentine Football Association) Independiente |
| 21 | MF | Octavio Alfonso | 19 December 2005 (aged 19) | (Paraguayan Football Association) Guaraní |
| 22 | GK | Leonardo Sosa | 18 April 2007 (aged 17) | (Argentine Football Association) Rosario Central |
| 23 | FW | Anderson Leguizamón | 17 February 2006 (aged 18) | (Paraguayan Football Association) Guaraní |

=== Chile ===
Chile announced their 23-man squad on 19 January 2025.

Head coach: Nicolás Córdova

| No. | Pos. | Player | Date of birth (age) | Club |
|---|---|---|---|---|
| 1 | GK | Martín Contreras | 19 May 2005 (aged 19) | (Football Federation of Chile) Universidad Católica |
| 2 | DF | **Ian Garguez** | 3 February 2005 (aged 19) | (Football Federation of Chile) Palestino |
| 3 | DF | **Iván Román** | 12 July 2006 (aged 18) | (Football Federation of Chile) Palestino |
| 4 | DF | Yahir Salazar | 19 January 2005 (aged 20) | (Football Federation of Chile) Universidad de Chile |
| 5 | DF | Nicolás Suárez | 31 July 2005 (aged 19) | (Football Federation of Chile) Colo-Colo |
| 6 | MF | Gabriel Pinto | 25 February 2005 (aged 19) | (Football Federation of Chile) O'Higgins |
| 7 | FW | Favian Loyola | 18 May 2005 (aged 19) | (United States Soccer Federation) Orlando City SC |
| 8 | MF | Joaquín Silva | 6 March 2005 (aged 19) | (Football Federation of Chile) Santiago Wanderers |
| 9 | FW | **Damián Pizarro** | 28 March 2005 (aged 19) | (Italian Football Federation) Udinese |
| 10 | MF | **Agustín Arce** | 24 January 2005 (aged 19) | (Football Federation of Chile) Universidad de Chile |
| 11 | FW | Willy Chatiliez | 26 March 2005 (aged 18) | (Royal Spanish Football Federation) Huesca |
| 12 | GK | Ignacio Sáez | 4 September 2005 (aged 19) | (Football Federation of Chile) Universidad de Chile |
| 13 | DF | Matías Pérez | 13 April 2005 (aged 19) | (Football Federation of Chile) Curicó Unido |
| 14 | FW | Ignacio Vásquez | 22 May 2006 (aged 18) | (Football Federation of Chile) Universidad de Chile |
| 15 | MF | Javier Cárcamo | 1 February 2005 (aged 19) | (Football Federation of Chile) Huachipato |
| 16 | MF | Fernando Sanguinetti | 25 January 2005 (aged 19) | (Football Federation of Chile) Universidad de Chile |
| 17 | FW | **Emiliano Ramos** | 8 March 2005 (aged 19) | (Football Federation of Chile) Everton |
| 18 | FW | Juan Francisco Rossel | 17 March 2005 (aged 19) | (Football Federation of Chile) Universidad Católica |
| 19 | DF | Patricio Romero | 25 May 2005 (aged 19) | (Football Federation of Chile) Cobreloa |
| 20 | DF | **Felipe Faúndez** | 27 March 2006 (aged 18) | (Football Federation of Chile) O'Higgins |
| 21 | FW | Benjamín Aravena | 4 January 2005 (aged 20) | (Football Federation of Chile) Universidad de Chile |
| 22 | MF | Leandro Hernández | 12 June 2005 (aged 19) | (Football Federation of Chile) Colo-Colo |
| 23 | GK | Gabriel Maureira | 7 February 2007 (aged 17) | (Football Federation of Chile) Colo-Colo |

=== Peru ===
Peru announced their 23-man squad on 19 January 2025.

Head coach: José del Solar

| No. | Pos. | Player | Date of birth (age) | Club |
|---|---|---|---|---|
| 1 | GK | William Falcón | 27 April 2005 (aged 19) | (Peruvian Football Federation) Universidad César Vallejo |
| 2 | DF | Anderson Villacorta | 25 July 2005 (aged 19) | (Mexican Football Federation) Zacatecas |
| 3 | DF | Axel Cabellos | 18 November 2006 (aged 18) | (Argentine Football Association) Racing |
| 4 | DF | Brian Arias | 2 September 2006 (aged 18) | (Peruvian Football Federation) Alianza Lima |
| 5 | DF | Alejandro Pósito | 5 September 2005 (aged 19) | (Peruvian Football Federation) Sporting Cristal |
| 6 | MF | Ian Wisdom | 14 September 2005 (aged 19) | (Peruvian Football Federation) Sporting Cristal |
| 7 | FW | **Juan Pablo Goicochea** | 12 January 2005 (aged 20) | (Argentine Football Association) Platense |
| 8 | MF | Álvaro Rojas | 12 March 2005 (aged 19) | (Peruvian Football Federation) Universitario |
| 9 | FW | Víctor Guzmán | 25 March 2006 (aged 18) | (Peruvian Football Federation) Alianza Lima |
| 10 | MF | Sebastián Sánchez | 7 December 2005 (aged 19) | (Peruvian Football Federation) Sporting Cristal |
| 11 | FW | **Maxloren Castro** | 8 December 2007 (aged 17) | (Peruvian Football Federation) Sporting Cristal |
| 12 | GK | Jhefferson Rodríguez | 13 March 2006 (aged 18) | (Peruvian Football Federation) Universitario |
| 13 | MF | Homali Ruiz | 12 March 2006 (aged 18) | (Peruvian Football Federation) Universidad San Martín |
| 14 | DF | Julinho Astudillo | 1 July 2005 (aged 19) | (Peruvian Football Federation) Universitario |
| 15 | DF | Nicolás Amasifuén | 5 July 2005 (aged 19) | (Peruvian Football Federation) Alianza Lima |
| 16 | MF | Esteban Cruz | 12 February 2006 (aged 18) | (Peruvian Football Federation) Universitario |
| 17 | DF | Jussepi García | 6 July 2007 (aged 17) | (Peruvian Football Federation) Alianza Lima |
| 18 | DF | Fabrizio Lora | 30 August 2005 (aged 19) | (Peruvian Football Federation) Sporting Cristal |
| 19 | FW | Rodrigo Dioses | 20 February 2005 (aged 19) | (Peruvian Football Federation) Universitario |
| 20 | FW | **Bassco Soyer** | 17 October 2006 (aged 18) | (Peruvian Football Federation) Alianza Lima |
| 21 | GK | Paolo Doneda | 18 May 2007 (aged 17) | (Italian Football Federation) Milan |
| 22 | MF | Sebastián Cornejo | 8 May 2006 (aged 18) | (Peruvian Football Federation) Universidad San Martín |
| 23 | DF | Mateo Arakaki | 1 July 2008 (aged 16) | (Peruvian Football Federation) Alianza Lima |

== Group B ==
=== Brazil ===
Brazil announced their 23-man squad on 20 December 2024. On 7 January 2025, the goalkeeper Otávio and defenders JP Chermont and Pedro Lima were replaced by Henrique Menke, Igor Serrote and Igor Felisberto, respectively On 13 January, midfielder Gabriel Carvalho was reported as injured and one day later was replaced by Arthur Dias. On 15 January, defender Igor Felisberto was replaced by Paulinho due to an injury.

Head coach: Ramon Menezes

| No. | Pos. | Player | Date of birth (age) | Club |
|---|---|---|---|---|
| 1 | GK | Robert | 3 February 2005 (aged 19) | (Brazilian Football Confederation) Atlético Mineiro |
| 2 | DF | Paulinho | 23 May 2005 (aged 19) | (Brazilian Football Confederation) Vasco da Gama |
| 3 | DF | Jair Cunha | 7 March 2005 (aged 19) | (Brazilian Football Confederation) Santos |
| 4 | DF | Filipe Bordon | 24 June 2005 (aged 19) | (Italian Football Federation) Lazio |
| 5 | MF | Gabriel Moscardo | 28 September 2005 (aged 19) | (French Football Federation) Reims |
| 6 | DF | Leandrinho | 17 March 2005 (aged 19) | (Brazilian Football Confederation) Vasco da Gama |
| 7 | FW | **Rayan** | 3 August 2006 (aged 18) | (Brazilian Football Confederation) Vasco da Gama |
| 8 | MF | Breno Bidon | 20 February 2005 (aged 19) | (Brazilian Football Confederation) Corinthians |
| 9 | FW | Deivid Washington | 5 June 2005 (aged 19) | (The Football Association) Chelsea |
| 10 | FW | Pedro | 5 February 2006 (aged 18) | (Russian Football Union) Zenit Saint Petersburg |
| 11 | FW | Nathan Fernandes | 16 February 2005 (aged 19) | (Brazilian Football Confederation) Grêmio |
| 12 | GK | Felipe Longo | 5 March 2005 (aged 19) | (Brazilian Football Confederation) Corinthians |
| 13 | DF | Igor Serrote | 1 March 2005 (aged 19) | (Brazilian Football Confederation) Grêmio |
| 14 | DF | Iago | 18 April 2005 (aged 19) | (Brazilian Football Confederation) Flamengo |
| 15 | DF | Anthony | 12 July 2005 (aged 19) | (Brazilian Football Confederation) Goiás |
| 16 | DF | José Guilherme | 16 March 2005 (aged 19) | (Brazilian Football Confederation) Bahia |
| 17 | FW | Gustavo Prado | 6 June 2005 (aged 19) | (Brazilian Football Confederation) Internacional |
| 18 | MF | Kauan | 16 April 2005 (aged 19) | (Brazilian Football Confederation) Fortaleza |
| 19 | FW | Ricardo Mathias | 25 July 2006 (aged 18) | (Brazilian Football Confederation) Internacional |
| 20 | DF | Arthur Dias | 10 April 2007 (aged 17) | (Brazilian Football Confederation) Athletico Paranaense |
| 21 | FW | Wesley | 5 March 2005 (aged 19) | (Saudi Arabian Football Federation) Al-Nassr |
| 22 | GK | Henrique Menke | 12 January 2007 (aged 18) | (Brazilian Football Confederation) Internacional |
| 23 | FW | Alisson Santana | 21 September 2005 (aged 19) | (Brazilian Football Confederation) Atlético Mineiro |

=== Colombia ===
Colombia announced their 23-man squad on 15 January 2025. On 17 January 2025, midfielder Joel Canchimbo was replaced by Sergio Aponzá due to an injured.

Head coach: César Torres

| No. | Pos. | Player | Date of birth (age) | Club |
|---|---|---|---|---|
| 1 | GK | Jordan García | 20 June 2005 (aged 19) | (Colombian Football Federation) Fortaleza |
| 2 | DF | Simón García | 11 January 2005 (aged 20) | (Colombian Football Federation) Atlético Nacional |
| 3 | DF | Keimer Sandoval | 3 September 2005 (aged 19) | (Royal Spanish Football Federation) Real Betis |
| 4 | DF | Julián Bazán | 25 November 2005 (aged 19) | (Colombian Football Federation) Deportivo Pereira |
| 5 | DF | Elkin Quiñones | 12 May 2005 (aged 19) | (Colombian Football Federation) Orsomarso |
| 6 | MF | Alejandro Ararat | 21 July 2006 (aged 18) | (Colombian Football Federation) Atlético Huila |
| 7 | MF | Sergio Aponzá | 28 July 2005 (aged 19) | (Colombian Football Federation) Alianza |
| 8 | MF | Royner Benítez | 21 June 2005 (aged 19) | (Colombian Football Federation) Águilas Doradas |
| 9 | FW | Alejandro Villarreal | 28 July 2005 (aged 19) | (Brazilian Football Confederation) Santos |
| 10 | FW | Óscar Perea | 27 September 2005 (aged 19) | (French Football Federation) Strasbourg |
| 11 | FW | Andy Batioja | 31 January 2006 (aged 18) | (United States Soccer Federation) Houston Dynamo FC |
| 12 | GK | Andrés Tovar | 25 March 2006 (aged 18) | (Colombian Football Federation) Envigado |
| 13 | DF | Luis Rentería | 27 November 2005 (aged 19) | (Colombian Football Federation) Santa Fe |
| 14 | MF | Jordan Barrera | 11 April 2006 (aged 18) | (Colombian Football Federation) Barranquilla |
| 15 | DF | Yeimar Mosquera | 6 February 2005 (aged 19) | (The Football Association) Aston Villa |
| 16 | FW | Yefrei Rodríguez | 11 May 2005 (aged 19) | (Colombian Football Federation) Internacional |
| 17 | DF | Juan David Arizala | 10 October 2005 (aged 19) | (Colombian Football Federation) Independiente Medellín |
| 18 | MF | Luis Landázuri | 20 November 2005 (aged 17) | (Colombian Football Federation) Atlético Nacional |
| 19 | MF | Kener González | 5 October 2005 (aged 19) | (Colombian Football Federation) Internacional |
| 20 | MF | John Montaño | 4 October 2006 (aged 18) | (Colombian Football Federation) Independiente Medellín |
| 21 | DF | Carlos Sarabia | 13 June 2005 (aged 19) | (Colombian Football Federation) Millonarios |
| 22 | GK | Alexei Rojas | 28 September 2005 (aged 19) | (The Football Association) Arsenal |
| 23 | FW | Néiser Villarreal | 24 April 2005 (aged 19) | (Colombian Football Federation) Millonarios |

=== Ecuador ===
Ecuador announced their 23-man squad on 5 January 2025. On 15 January 2024, defender Diogo Bagüí was reported as injured and two days later was replaced by Deinner Ordóñez. Ecuador's squad was reduced to 22 players because defender Jair Collahuazo was recalled by his club New York Red Bulls, leaving Ecuador without the possibility of replacing him (replacements are allowed only in case of serious injury or illness).

Head coach: Miguel Bravo

| No. | Pos. | Player | Date of birth (age) | Club |
|---|---|---|---|---|
| 1 | GK | Cristhian Loor | 9 March 2006 (aged 18) | (Ecuadorian Football Federation) Independiente del Valle |
| 3 | DF | Deinner Ordóñez | 29 October 2009 (aged 15) | (Ecuadorian Football Federation) Independiente del Valle |
| 4 | DF | Davis Bautista | 16 February 2005 (aged 19) | (German Football Association) Eintracht Frankfurt |
| 5 | MF | Ronny Borja | 10 June 2005 (aged 19) | (Ecuadorian Football Federation) Emelec |
| 6 | DF | Elkin Ruiz | 27 May 2006 (aged 18) | (Ecuadorian Football Federation) Independiente del Valle |
| 7 | MF | **Keny Arroyo** | 14 February 2006 (aged 18) | (Ecuadorian Football Federation) Independiente del Valle |
| 8 | MF | **Jeremy Arévalo** | 19 March 2005 (aged 19) | (Royal Spanish Football Federation) Racing Santander |
| 9 | FW | Michael Bermúdez | 13 January 2006 (aged 19) | (Football Association of Serbia) OFK Beograd |
| 10 | MF | **Kendry Páez** | 4 May 2007 (aged 17) | (Ecuadorian Football Federation) Independiente del Valle |
| 11 | FW | **Allen Obando** | 13 June 2006 (aged 18) | (Ecuadorian Football Federation) Barcelona |
| 12 | GK | Jhafets Reyes | 16 September 2006 (aged 18) | (Royal Spanish Football Federation) Cartagena |
| 13 | DF | Fricio Caicedo | 17 April 2008 (aged 16) | (Ecuadorian Football Federation) LDU Quito |
| 14 | DF | Maikel Caicedo | 12 March 2005 (aged 19) | (Ecuadorian Football Federation) LDU Quito |
| 15 | MF | Juan Sebastián Rodríguez | 27 March 2006 (aged 18) | (Ecuadorian Football Federation) LDU Quito |
| 16 | MF | Justin Lerma | 5 May 2008 (aged 16) | (Ecuadorian Football Federation) Independiente del Valle |
| 17 | MF | Bruno Caicedo | 15 January 2005 (aged 20) | (Ecuadorian Football Federation) Barcelona |
| 18 | MF | Dary García | 24 March 2005 (aged 19) | (Ecuadorian Football Federation) Independiente del Valle |
| 19 | FW | Elian Caicedo | 6 March 2005 (aged 19) | (Ecuadorian Football Federation) Mushuc Runa |
| 20 | MF | Elkin Muñoz | 29 June 2005 (aged 19) | (Ecuadorian Football Federation) Emelec |
| 21 | MF | Gipson Preciado | 4 June 2005 (aged 19) | (Ecuadorian Football Federation) Independiente Juniors |
| 22 | GK | Miguel Peralta | 26 April 2008 (aged 16) | (Ecuadorian Football Federation) Independiente del Valle |
| 23 | DF | Luis Moreno | 28 February 2005 (aged 19) | (Ecuadorian Football Federation) Universidad Católica |

=== Argentina ===
Argentina announced their 23-man squad on 6 January 2025.

Head coach: Diego Placente

| No. | Pos. | Player | Date of birth (age) | Club |
|---|---|---|---|---|
| 1 | GK | Santino Barbi | 14 June 2005 (aged 19) | (Argentine Football Association) Talleres (C) |
| 2 | DF | Juan Giménez | 27 April 2006 (aged 18) | (Argentine Football Association) Rosario Central |
| 3 | DF | Julio Soler | 16 February 2005 (aged 19) | (The Football Association) Bournemouth |
| 4 | DF | Dylan Gorosito | 3 February 2006 (aged 18) | (Argentine Football Association) Boca Juniors |
| 5 | MF | Mariano Gerez | 19 January 2006 (aged 19) | (Argentine Football Association) Lanús |
| 6 | DF | Juan Manuel Villalba | 15 March 2006 (aged 18) | (Argentine Football Association) Gimnasia y Esgrima (LP) |
| 7 | FW | Maher Carrizo | 19 February 2006 (aged 18) | (Argentine Football Association) Vélez Sarsfield |
| 8 | MF | Milton Delgado | 16 June 2005 (aged 19) | (Argentine Football Association) Boca Juniors |
| 9 | FW | Agustín Ruberto | 14 January 2006 (aged 19) | (Argentine Football Association) River Plate |
| 10 | MF | Claudio Echeverri | 2 January 2006 (aged 19) | (The Football Association) Manchester City |
| 11 | MF | **Franco Mastantuono** | 14 August 2007 (aged 17) | (Argentine Football Association) River Plate |
| 12 | GK | Agustín Chávez | 21 October 2005 (aged 19) | (Argentine Football Association) Unión |
| 13 | DF | Thiago Silvero | 18 April 2006 (aged 18) | (Argentine Football Association) Vélez Sarsfield |
| 14 | DF | Tobías Ramírez | 11 November 2006 (aged 18) | (Argentine Football Association) Argentinos Juniors |
| 15 | MF | Ignacio Perruzzi | 5 April 2005 (aged 19) | (Argentine Football Association) San Lorenzo |
| 16 | DF | Agustín Obregón | 11 February 2006 (aged 18) | (Argentine Football Association) River Plate |
| 17 | MF | Valentino Acuña | 27 January 2006 (aged 18) | (Argentine Football Association) Newell's Old Boys |
| 18 | DF | Teo Rodríguez Pagano | 12 October 2005 (aged 19) | (Argentine Football Association) San Lorenzo |
| 19 | FW | Santino Andino | 25 October 2005 (aged 19) | (Argentine Football Association) Godoy Cruz |
| 20 | FW | Alex Woiski | 17 March 2006 (aged 18) | (Royal Spanish Football Federation) Mallorca |
| 21 | FW | Ian Subiabre | 1 January 2007 (aged 18) | (Argentine Football Association) River Plate |
| 22 | FW | Santiago Hidalgo | 17 February 2005 (aged 19) | (Argentine Football Association) Independiente |
| 23 | GK | Jeremías Martinet | 30 August 2005 (aged 19) | (Argentine Football Association) River Plate |

=== Bolivia ===
Bolivia announced their 23-man squad on 20 January 2025.

Head coach: (Argentina) Jorge Perrotta

| No. | Pos. | Player | Date of birth (age) | Club |
|---|---|---|---|---|
| 1 | GK | Fabián Pereira | 16 May 2006 (aged 18) | (Bolivian Football Federation) Always Ready |
| 2 | DF | **Marcelo Torrez** | 8 July 2006 (aged 18) | (Brazilian Football Confederation) Santos |
| 3 | DF | **Diego Arroyo** | 29 April 2005 (aged 19) | (Bolivian Football Federation) Bolívar |
| 4 | DF | **Lucas Macazaga** | 17 August 2006 (aged 18) | (Royal Spanish Football Federation) Leganés |
| 5 | MF | Santiago Cuiza | 16 June 2005 (aged 19) | (Bolivian Football Federation) Real Tomayapo |
| 6 | DF | Fabio Zamora | 15 November 2005 (aged 19) | (Bolivian Football Federation) Always Ready |
| 7 | MF | Santiago Melgar | 4 June 2005 (aged 19) | (Bolivian Football Federation) Oriente Petrolero |
| 8 | MF | **Óscar López** | 13 August 2006 (aged 18) | (Royal Spanish Football Federation) Mallorca |
| 9 | FW | Santiago Castedo | 24 July 2005 (aged 19) | (Bolivian Football Federation) Blooming |
| 10 | MF | **Moisés Paniagua** | 16 August 2007 (aged 17) | (Bolivian Football Federation) Always Ready |
| 11 | FW | Jairo Rojas | 29 July 2006 (aged 18) | (Bolivian Football Federation) Always Ready |
| 12 | GK | Diego Caballero | 27 July 2006 (aged 18) | (Bolivian Football Federation) Destroyers |
| 13 | DF | Percy Añez | 30 April 2005 (aged 19) | (Bolivian Football Federation) The Strongest |
| 14 | DF | Carlos Medina | 2 October 2005 (aged 19) | (Bolivian Football Federation) Always Ready |
| 15 | MF | Nathan Tito | 4 April 2005 (aged 19) | (Argentine Football Association) Platense |
| 16 | MF | Matías Galindo | 10 April 2006 (aged 18) | (Bolivian Football Federation) Always Ready |
| 17 | MF | **Guilmar Centella** | 26 March 2005 (aged 19) | (Bolivian Football Federation) Blooming |
| 18 | DF | Yeison Salazar | 17 April 2006 (aged 18) | (Royal Spanish Football Federation) Atlético Baleares |
| 19 | DF | Leonardo Montenegro | 22 March 2005 (aged 19) | (Bolivian Football Federation) San Antonio Bulo Bulo |
| 20 | MF | Emanuel Paniagua | 5 November 2005 (aged 19) | (Bolivian Football Federation) Always Ready |
| 21 | FW | Patrick Rodríguez | 29 April 2005 (aged 19) | (Italian Football Federation) Supergiovane Castelbuono |
| 22 | FW | Diego Cabrera | 29 January 2005 (aged 19) | (Bolivian Football Federation) Oriente Petrolero |
| 23 | GK | Juan José Camacho | 16 December 2005 (aged 19) | (Bolivian Football Federation) Blooming |
