= Ignacio Vázquez =

Ignacio Vázquez may refer to:

- Ignacio Vázquez (footballer, born 1971), Mexican forward
- Ignacio Vázquez (footballer, born 1997), Argentine defender
- Ignacio Vázquez (politician) (born 1977), Spanish politician
- Ignacio Vázquez Torres (1939–2023), Mexican lawyer and politician

Vásquez:

- Ignacio Vásquez (rower) (born 1998), Olympic rower from the Dominican Republic
- Ignacio Vásquez (footballer) (born 2006), Chilean footballer
