= Simón García =

Colombian footballer (born 2005)

Personal information
- Full name: Simón García Valero
- Date of birth: 11 January 2005 (age 21)
- Place of birth: Ibagué, Colombia
- Height: 1.89 m (6 ft 2 in)
- Position: Centre back

Team information
- Current team: Rio Ave
- Number: 3

Youth career
- Atlético Nacional

Senior career*
Years	Team	Apps	(Gls)
2023–2026	Atlético Nacional	44	(2)
2026–	Rio Ave	2	(0)

International career
2025	Colombia U20	20	(0)
- * Club domestic league appearances and goals as of 20:34, 10 October 2026 (UTC)

Simón García Valero (born 11 January 2005) is a Colombian professional footballer who plays as a centre back for Portuguese club Rio Ave.

== Club career ==
Born in Ibagué, García did not envision a professional football career, and sought to complete school and go into business. After playing a tournament for the Tolima Department, he was approached by a scout from Atlético Nacional, and moved alone to the city of Medellín at age 16. While in the youth teams, he moved positions from right back to central midfielder, to the wing and finally to centre back to fill a gap.

On 16 November 2025, in the second leg of the semi-finals of the Copa Colombia, García was sent off in first-half added time, while his team defeated América de Cali 6–3 on aggregate. He returned for the second leg of the final against city rivals Independiente Medellín but did not enter the pitch for the 1–0 win. On 13 May 2026, he scored the only two goals of his 50 appearances for Atlético Nacional, in a 7–1 home win over Internacional de Bogotá in the second leg of the Apertura quarter-finals (9–2 aggregate).

On 4 September 2026, García moved to Portuguese club Rio Ave, in the Primeira Liga. He signed a five-year contract. The deal was reported in Colombia as being worth US$2.3 million for 75% of his economic rights. He made his debut on 14 September in a 3–3 home draw with Estrela da Amadora.

== International career ==
García was part of the Colombia under-20 squad that came third at the 2025 South American U-20 Championship in Venezuela. He missed the last two games due to a nasal fracture caused by the hand of Argentina's Maher Carrizo. Later in the year, he was in the squad as they also finished third at the 2025 FIFA U-20 World Cup in Chile, beating France to the bronze medals. He had been suspended for the quarter-final win over Spain, due to receiving yellow cards in two preceding games.
