= Jorge Alfredo Silva Cardona =

Venezuelan politician and businessman

- Born: January 31, 1987; Táchira, Venezuela
- Education: University of Preston (Administration, Economics), Associate's Degree in Penal Investigation, Diploma in Business Management
- Occupation: Businessman
- Employer(s): Grupo JHS, A&B Oil and Gas
- Known for: Founding Grupo JHS, President of Deportivo Táchira
- Children: 3

Jorge Alfredo Silva Cardona (born January 31, 1987, in Táchira) is a Venezuelan businessman in the agro-industrial and natural resources sectors.

== Biography ==
=== Education ===
Jorge Silva held a degree in Administration with a specialization in economics from the University of Preston and an associate degree in Penal Investigation. He also had a diploma in Business Management.

=== Career ===
In 2012, Jorge Silva founded Grupo JHS, starting with the production of two farms with more than 400,000 laying hens, located in the States of Cojedes, Aragua, and Yaracuy. In 2013, the business group started producing processed chicken by setting up a farm in Yaracuy for breeding hens and producing fertile chicken eggs. Jorge Silva also established incubators in production farms across Yaracuy, Carabobo, Lara, Aragua, Barinas, Cojedes, and Portuguesa to enter the protein market.

At the same time, they partnered with the genetic company Topigs Norvins to start pork production on two farms in Táchira and Guárico. These farms have a breeding stock of TN70 pigs for the Venezuelan market.

In 2013, these agro-industrial and food companies formed the JHS Group. JHS Group began commercial relations with the Brazilian Group JBS, a protein supplier, which led to the sale of proteins from South America to public and private markets in Venezuela. The company also supports community initiatives for children and teenagers through the Misael Silva Roa Foundation.

In 2016, the JHS Group acquired the Deportivo Táchira Soccer Club (in Spanish Club de Fútbol Deportivo Táchira), champion of the national tournament and participant in CONMEBOL, Copa Libertadores and Copa Sudamericana. Also, Silva is the president of Deportivo Táchira, a prominent Venezuelan soccer team.

At the same year, Silva established the Instituto Universitario de Tecnología Agroindustrial (IUTA JHS), which offers free education in Poultry Production and Agroindustrial Production using the "Learning by Doing" methodology.

In 2019, Jorge Silva began the study of opportunities in several oil fields and founded A&B Oil and Gas, a joint venture with the Venezuelan state oil company. A&B Group is a partner of the Venezuelan state oil company through a joint venture.
