= Lucas Quintana =

Paraguayan footballer (born 2005)

Personal information
- Full name: Lucas Ariel Quintana Rodríguez
- Date of birth: 2 January 2005 (age 21)
- Place of birth: Paraguay
- Height: 1.85 m (6 ft 1 in)
- Position: Centre-back

Team information
- Current team: Club Cerro Porteño
- Number: 14

Youth career
- --: Club Cerro Porteño

Senior career*
Years	Team	Apps	(Gls)
2023–	Club Cerro Porteño	38	(0)

International career
2025	Paraguay U20		
- * Club domestic league appearances and goals as of 12 August 2025

Lucas Ariel Quintana Rodríguez (born 2 January 2005) is a Paraguayan footballer who plays as a centre-back for Club Cerro Porteño in the Paraguayan Primera División.

== Club career ==
Quintana was developed in the youth ranks of Club Cerro Porteño, and was promoted to the first team in 2023. He made his official debut on 29 January 2023, in a Paraguayan Primera División match against Sportivo Ameliano.

== International career ==
Quintana was called up to the Paraguay under-20 national team, participating in the 2025 South American Under-20 Championship in Venezuela, where he played three matches as a starter.

== Career statistics ==
=== Club ===
Season	Club	League			Domestic cups			Continental cups			Total	
Season	Club	Comp	Apps	Goals	Comp	Apps	Goals	Comp	Apps	Goals	Apps	Goals
2023	PRY Club Cerro Porteño	PD	12	0	CP	2	0	CL	0	0	14	0
2024	PRY Club Cerro Porteño	PD	12	0	CP	2	0	CL	0	0	14	0
2025	PRY Club Cerro Porteño	PD	7	0	0	0	0	CL	2	0	9	0
Career total			31	0		4	0		2	0	37	0

=== International ===
Tournament	Edition	Apps	Goals	Assists
South American U-20 Championship	2025	4	0	0
