= Yahir Salazar =

Chilean footballer

Personal information
- Full name: Yahir Aaron Salazar Mondaca
- Date of birth: 19 January 2005 (age 21)
- Place of birth: Chile
- Height: 1.78 m (5 ft 10 in)
- Position: Defender

Team information
- Current team: Deportes La Serena (on loan from Universidad de Chile)
- Number: 17

Youth career
- Universidad de Chile

Senior career*
Years	Team	Apps	(Gls)
2022–	Universidad de Chile	1	(0)
2023	→ Huachipato (loan)	0	(0)
2024	→ San Luis (loan)	9	(0)
2025	→ Audax Italiano (loan)	4	(0)
2026–	→ Deportes La Serena (loan)	10	(0)

International career^{‡}
2021–2025	Chile U20	23	(0)
- * Club domestic league appearances and goals as of 21 April 2026 ‡ National team caps and goals as of 21 April 2026

Yahir Aaron Salazar Mondaca (born 19 November 2005) is a Chilean footballer who plays as a Defender for Deportes La Serena on loan from Universidad de Chile. He can operate as a left-back or a centre-back.

== Club career ==
A product of Universidad de Chile, Salazar was promoted to the first team in 2022 under Diego López and made his professional debut in the 4–0 away loss against Huachipato for the Chilean Primera División on 30 October of the same year.

In 2023, Salazar was loaned to Huachipato, but he returned to Universidad de Chile in August of the same year. The next year, he was loaned out to San Luis de Quillota in the Primera B de Chile.

The next two seasons, Salazar was loaned out to Audax Italiano and Deportes La Serena.

== International career ==
Salazar took part in trainings with Chile U17.

Salazar has represented Chile U20 in several friendlies between 2021 and 2024. In official championships, he represented them in the 2022 South American Games and the South American Championship in 2023 and 2025.

== Personal life ==
Salazar was a partner of Catalina Díaz, sister of Chile international footballer Paulo Díaz.
