= Jeremías Martinet =

Argentine footballer (born 2005)

Personal information
- Full name: Jeremías Martín Pablo Martinet
- Date of birth: 30 August 2005 (age 21)
- Place of birth: Las Condes, Santiago de Chile, Chile
- Height: 1.87 m (6 ft 1 1/2 in)
- Position: Goalkeeper

Team information
- Current team: River Plate
- Number: 57

Youth career
- 2010–2018: Club Social y Deportivo Lasallano
- 2018–2022: Club Deportivo Atalaya
- 2022–: River Plate

Senior career*
| Years | Team | Apps | (Gls) |
| 2026– | River Plate | 0 | (0) |

International career
| 2025 | Argentina U20 | 6 | (0) |
- * Club domestic league appearances and goals

Jeremías Martín Pablo Martinet (born 30 August 2005) is an Argentine professional association football player who plays as a goalkeeper for Argentine Primera División club River Plate

== Club career ==
=== Early career ===
Martinet was born on 30 August 2005 in Santiago de Chile, he is son of French father and Argentine mother. At the age of five, he moved to Córdoba, where he began playing for Club Social y Deportivo Lasallano. At thirteen, he started playing for Club Deportivo Atalaya. In 2022, after being scouted, he joined Club Atlético River Plate.

=== River Plate ===
Martinet competed in the ''Torneo Promesas 2023'', an under-18 competition organized by Cerro Porteño in 2023, where he was chosen as the best goalkeeper of the competition and obtained the least goals conceded. In 2024, he would be called up by Lionel Scaloni as a sparring for the Argentina national football team and would begin to perform as the starting goalkeeper in River Plate reserve squad.

Following Franco Armani's departure, Martinet became the club's third-choice goalkeeper behind Santiago Beltrán and Ezequiel Centurión. River's coach Eduardo Coudet called him up for the first time for the Copa Argentina Round of 64 match against Aldosivi. Martinet was an unused substitute, and River Plate lost the match 3-1.

== International career ==
Martinet was part of the Argentine squad that participated in the 2025 South American U-20 Championship. He started in the goalless draw against Ecuador in the first round and in all five matches of the final round of the tournament. In total, he played six matches and conceded eight goals.
