= Lucas Agazzi =

Uruguayan footballer (born 2005)

Personal information
- Full name: Lucas Agazzi Galeano
- Date of birth: 2 May 2005 (age 21)
- Place of birth: Montevideo, Uruguay
- Height: 1.80 m (5 ft 11 in)
- Positions: Right winger; right-back

Team information
- Current team: Defensor Sporting
- Number: 11

Youth career
- Carrasco Polo
- Defensor Sporting

Senior career*
Years	Team	Apps	(Gls)
2023–	Defensor Sporting	109	(12)

International career
2024–2025	Uruguay U20	26	(1)
- * Club domestic league appearances and goals as of 13 September 2026

Lucas Agazzi Galeano (born 2 May 2005) is a Uruguayan professional footballer who plays as a right winger or right-back for Liga AUF Uruguaya club Defensor Sporting.

== Club career ==
Agazzi played baby fútbol for Carrasco Polo Club before joining Defensor Sporting. He made his professional debut for Defensor on 7 February 2023 in a 1–3 defeat to Fénix.

== International career ==
Agazzi was part of the Uruguay under-20 team which won the 2024 COTIF. During the group stage of the tournament, he scored a goal in a 1–0 win against Sevilla. In January 2025, he was named in Uruguay's 23-man squad for the 2025 South American U-20 Championship.

In March 2025, Agazzi received his first call-up to the Uruguay national team.

== Career statistics ==
As of match played 13 September 2026

Appearances and goals by club, season and competition
Club	Season	League			National cup		Continental		Other		Total	
Club	Season	Division	Apps	Goals	Apps	Goals	Apps	Goals	Apps	Goals	Apps	Goals
Defensor Sporting	2023	Liga AUF Uruguaya	26	3	2	0	1 (Note: Appearance in Copa Sudamericana)	0	1 (Note: Appearance in Torneo Intermedio final)	0	30	3
Defensor Sporting	2024	Liga AUF Uruguaya	30	1	2	0	2 (Note: Appearances in Copa Libertadores)	0	1 (Note: Appearance in Supercopa Uruguaya)	0	35	1
Defensor Sporting	2025	Liga AUF Uruguaya	25	5	4	0	0	0	—		29	5
Defensor Sporting	2026	Liga AUF Uruguaya	28	3	1	0	1	0	—		30	3
Career total			109	12	9	0	4	0	2	0	124	12

== Honours ==
Defensor Sporting

- Copa Uruguay: 2023, 2024
