= Álex Woiski =

Argentine footballer (born 2009)

Alex Woiski
Personal information
- Full name: Alexander Woiski Pioletti
- Date of birth: 17 March 2006 (age 20)
- Place of birth: Palma de Mallorca, Spain
- Height: 1.72 m (5 ft 8 in)
- Positions: Winger; forward

Team information
- Current team: Deportivo Táchira
- Number: 17

Youth career
- –2025: Mallorca
- 2025–2026: River Plate

Senior career*
Years	Team	Apps	(Gls)
2026–	Deportivo Táchira	10	(2)

International career^{‡}
2024–2026	Argentina U20	6	(0)
- * Club domestic league appearances and goals ‡ National team caps and goals as of 14 February 2025

Alexander Woiski Pioletti (born 17 March 2006) is a professional footballer who plays as a winger or forward for Liga FUTVE club Deportivo Táchira. Born in Spain, he is a youth international for Argentina.

== Early life ==
Woiski was born on 17 March 2006. Born in Palma de Mallorca, Spain, he is the son of a Spanish father and an Argentine mother.

== Club career ==
As a youth player, Woiski joined the youth academy of Spanish side Mallorca at the age of seven. Following his stint there, he joined the youth academy of Argentine side River Plate in 2025.

== International career ==
Born in Spain, Woiski is an Argentina youth international. During January and February 2025, he played for the Argentina national under-20 football team at the 2025 South American U-20 Championship.

Besides Spain and Argentina, Woiski is also eligible to play for Puerto Rico and Suriname through his father and paternal grandfather's places of birth, respectively.

== Style of play ==
Woiski plays as a winger or forward and is right-footed. American news website ESPN Deportes wrote in 2025 that he "usually plays as a playmaker or striker... a striker with a tendency to look for the shot, but with a skill that allows him to play away from the box. He usually positions himself on the left side of the attacking front".

== Personal life ==
Woiski's mother is of Italian descent, while his paternal grandfather was of Dutch descent.
