= Renzo Machado =

Uruguayan football player (born 2005)

Personal information
- Full name: Renzo Neri Machado Pertusso
- Date of birth: 21 September 2005 (age 21)
- Place of birth: Rocha, Uruguay
- Height: 1.78 m (5 ft 10 in)
- Position: Forward

Team information
- Current team: Liverpool Montevideo
- Number: 9

Youth career
- Liverpool Montevideo

Senior career*
Years	Team	Apps	(Gls)
2023–	Liverpool Montevideo	105	(15)

International career
2024–2025	Uruguay U20	21	(7)
- * Club domestic league appearances and goals as of 20 November 2026

Renzo Neri Machado Pertusso (born 21 September 2005) is a Uruguayan professional footballer who plays as a forward for Liga AUF Uruguaya club Liverpool Montevideo.

== Club career ==
Born in Rocha, Machado began his career at Liverpool Montevideo, choosing them over Montevideo's two largest teams Nacional and Peñarol.

Machado made his debut on 30 January 2023 in the 2023 Supercopa Uruguaya as a 66th-minute substitute as his team won 1–0 against Nacional. On 5 February, he made his bow in the Uruguayan Primera División again from the bench in a 2–1 loss way to the same team, on the first day of the season. He played 10 games as his team won the league for the first time, scoring once on 15 July to gain a 2–2 home draw with Plaza Colonia.

In the 2024 Supercopa Uruguaya on 31 January, Machado started in a 1–0 win over Defensor Sporting. On 12 May, he scored both of his team's goals in the first half of a 2–1 win over Cerro Largo at the Estadio Belvedere, ending five months without a home win.

== International career ==
On 21 March 2024, Machado made his debut for the Uruguay national under-20 football team. He started in a 1–0 friendly loss to Russia at the Estadio Luis Franzini. In January 2025, he was named in Uruguay's 23-man squad for the 2025 South American U-20 Championship.

== Honours ==
Liverpool Montevideo

- Uruguayan Primera División: 2023
- Supercopa Uruguaya: 2023, 2024
