= Patricio Pacífico =

Uruguayan footballer (born 2006)

Personal information
- Full name: Patricio Pacífico Domínguez
- Date of birth: 8 April 2006 (age 20)
- Place of birth: Montevideo, Uruguay
- Height: 1.87 m (6 ft 2 in)
- Position: Defender

Team information
- Current team: Barcelona B (on loan from Defensor Sporting)

Youth career
- –2024: Defensor Sporting

Senior career*
Years	Team	Apps	(Gls)
2023–	Defensor Sporting	37	(2)
2026–	→ Barcelona B (loan)	7	(1)

International career^{‡}
2022–2023	Uruguay U17	18	(1)
2024–	Uruguay U20	15	(1)
- * Club domestic league appearances and goals as of 15 May 2026 ‡ National team caps and goals as of 16 February 2025

Patricio Pacífico Domínguez (born 8 April 2006) is a Uruguayan professional footballer who plays as a defender for Segunda Federación club Barcelona Atlètic, on loan from Liga AUF Uruguaya club Defensor Sporting.

== Club career ==
As a youth player, Pacífico joined the youth academy of Uruguayan side Defensor Sporting and was promoted to the club's senior team in 2024, making his professional debut on 19 April; then-coach Martín Varini sent Pacífico onto the field in the second half in a match against Liverpool Montevideo. Pacífico helped the club win the Copa Uruguay later in the season.

On 2 February 2026, Pacífico was sent on loan to Spanish side Barcelona B with an option to buy.

== International career ==
Pacífico is a Uruguayan youth international. During January and February 2025, he played for the Uruguay national under-20 football team at the 2025 South American U-20 Championship.

== Style of play ==
Pacífico plays as a defender. Uruguayan newspaper El País wrote in 2026 that he "is a left-back, but he can also play as a center-back. He stands out for his impressive physique (he is 1.88 meters tall) and for his ability to win all kinds of duels".
