= Esteban Crucci =

Uruguayan footballer

Personal information
- Full name: Esteban Nahuel Crucci Picardo
- Date of birth: 5 July 2006 (age 20)
- Place of birth: Montevideo, Uruguay
- Height: 1.80 m (5 ft 11 in)
- Position: Forward

Team information
- Current team: Montevideo Wanderers
- Number: 29

Youth career
- 2020–2023: Montevideo Wanderers

Senior career*
Years	Team	Apps	(Gls)
2024–	Montevideo Wanderers	26	(3)

International career^{‡}
2022	Uruguay U17	3	(0)
2024–	Uruguay U20	11	(2)
- * Club domestic league appearances and goals as of 19:57, 18 July 2025 (UTC) ‡ National team caps and goals as of 19:57, 18 July 2025 (UTC)

Esteban Nahuel Crucci Picardo (born 5 July 2006) is a Uruguayan footballer who plays as a forward for Montevideo Wanderers.

== Club career ==
Born in Montevideo, Crucci joined local Montevideo Wanderers at under-14 level. His 20 goals for the under-19s in 2023 made him the top scorer that year in the entire organisation, leading to his first professional contract.

On 4 May 2024, Crucci scored his first professional goal in the Uruguayan Primera División to open a 2–0 home win over previously unbeaten Liverpool Montevideo. He came on in the 81st minute as a substitute for Matías Fonseca, and six minutes later he received the ball with his back to goal three-quarters up the pitch; he turned and ran past three opponents before taking his shot.

== International career ==
Crucci represented Uruguay at under-15 and under-17 level. In July 2024, he was the top scorer for the under-20 team at the L'Alcúdia International Football Tournament in Spain, though he was substituted through injury in the final victory over Argentina.

At the 2025 South American U-20 Championship, Crucci scored twice as Uruguay reached the final stage. He netted in a 6–0 group rout of Paraguay, and a 4–3 loss to Argentina.
