= Patricio Romero (Chilean footballer) =

Chilean footballer

Personal information
- Full name: Patricio Andrés Romero Fernández
- Date of birth: 25 May 2005 (age 21)
- Place of birth: Chuquicamata, Chile
- Height: 1.79 m (5 ft 10 in)
- Position: Left wing-back

Team information
- Current team: Universidad de Concepción (on loan from Cobreloa)

Youth career
- Cobreloa

Senior career*
Years	Team	Apps	(Gls)
2022–	Cobreloa	39	(0)
2022	→ Real San Joaquín (loan)	9	(0)
2023	→ Deportes Rengo (loan)	5	(0)
2026–	→ Universidad de Concepción (loan)	0	(0)

International career^{‡}
2025	Chile U20	13	(1)
- * Club domestic league appearances and goals as of 1 January 2026 ‡ National team caps and goals as of 1 January 2026

Patricio Andrés Romero Fernández (born 25 May 2005) is a Chilean professional footballer who plays as a left wing-back for Chilean Primera División club Universidad de Concepción on loan from Cobreloa.

== Club career ==
Born in Chuquicamata, nowadays part of Calama commune, Chile, Romero is a product of the local club, Cobreloa. He was loaned out to Segunda División Profesional clubs Real San Joaquín and Deportes Rengo in 2022 and 2023, respectively, and made his senior debut with Cobreloa in the 2–1 win against Cobresal on 2 March 2024 for the Chilean Primera División.

Getting regularity during 2025, Romero moved to Universidad de Concepción in the Liga de Primera on 24 December 2025.

== International career ==
Romero represented Chile at under-20 level in friendlies, the 2025 South American Championship and the 2025 FIFA World Cup.

== Personal life ==
Patricio is the younger brother of the footballer Sebastián Romero.
