= Teo Rodríguez Pagano =

Argentine footballer (born 2005)

Personal information
- Date of birth: 12 October 2005 (age 21)
- Place of birth: Buenos Aires, Argentina
- Height: 1.78 m (5 ft 10 in)
- Position: Left-back

Team information
- Current team: San Lorenzo
- Number: 3

Senior career*
Years	Team	Apps	(Gls)
2025–	San Lorenzo	25	(1)

International career^{‡}
2024–	Argentina U20		
Medal record
Men's football
Representing Argentina
FIFA U-20 World Cup
Runner-up	2025 Chile
South American U-20 Championship
Silver medal – second place	2025 Venezuela
- * Club domestic league appearances and goals as of 17:52, 21 November 2026 (UTC) ‡ National team caps and goals as of 14:02, 19 September 2025 (UTC)

Teo Rodríguez Pagano (born 12 October 2005) is an Argentine professional footballer who plays as a left-back for Argentine Primera División club San Lorenzo.

== Club career ==
Rodríguez's career at Ciclón spans two formative stages: the first, from 2012 to 2019, when he joined the youth football team at just 7 years old. After a break, he returned to the club in 2022, where he began to establish himself in his category, eventually joining the Reserve Division under the direction of Pipi Romagnoli.

Rodríguez Pagano's official debut in San Lorenzo's first team took place on 12 April 2025, in the 2025 Primera División, with a 1–0 victory against Atlético Tucumán.

== International career ==
In July 2024, Rodríguez was first called up by Diego Placente to the Argentina U20s for the L'Alcúdia International Football Tournament. He was named to their 23-man squad for the 2025 South American U-20 Championship on 6 January 2025. He made the final Argentina U20 squad for the 2025 FIFA U-20 World Cup.
