= Néiser Villarreal =

Colombian footballer (born 2005)

Personal information
- Full name: Néiser David Villarreal Quiñones
- Date of birth: 24 April 2005 (age 21)
- Place of birth: Tumaco, Colombia
- Height: 1.86 m (6 ft 1 in)
- Position: Forward

Team information
- Current team: Cruzeiro
- Number: 22

Youth career
- 2016–2023: Millonarios

Senior career*
Years	Team	Apps	(Gls)
2023–2025	Millonarios	26	(0)
2026–	Cruzeiro	25	(4)

International career^{‡}
2024–	Colombia U20	22	(15)
Medal record
Men's football
Representing Colombia
FIFA U-20 World Cup
Third place	2025 Chile
South American U-20 Championship
Third place	2025 Venezuela
- * Club domestic league appearances and goals as of 12 September 2026 ‡ National team caps and goals as of 12 September 2026

Néiser David Villarreal Quiñones (born 24 April 2005) is a Colombian professional footballer who plays for Cruzeiro as a forward.

A graduate of the Millonarios academy, Villarreal made his first-team debut during the 2023 Categoría Primera A season under manager Alberto Gamero and quickly established himself as one of the club's standout young players. In September 2025, he agreed to join Cruzeiro on a free transfer following the conclusion of the 2025 Categoría Primera A season. At international level, Villarreal has represented Colombia U20 since 2024, finishing as top scorer at the 2025 South American U-20 Championship and leading the nation to a third-place finish and qualification to the 2025 FIFA U-20 World Cup in Chile.

== Club career ==
=== Millionarios ===
Villarreal was born in Tumaco and came through the youth academy of Millonarios. He made his professional debut on 16 September 2023 under coach Alberto Gamero, coming on as a late substitute in a 3–0 Categoría Primera A victory over Atlético Bucaramanga. Over the following two seasons, he gradually broke into the first team, making a total of 26 league appearances and providing four assists, although he did not score any goals for Millonarios.

Ahead of the 2025 Categoría Primera A season, Millonarios entered negotiations to transfer Villarreal to Vasco da Gama, but the deal ultimately fell through and he remained at the club. With his contract set to expire at the end of the season, Villarreal chose not to renew his deal.

=== Cruzeiro ===
On 9 September 2025, it was announced that Villarreal had signed a pre-contract agreement with Cruzeiro in Brazil, joining the club on a free transfer in January 2026 on a five-year contract.

== International career ==
At youth level, Villarreal represented the Colombia U20 at the 2025 South American U-20 Championship in Venezuela, where he scored eight goals—including the winner in a 1–0 victory against the Brazil U20—and finished as the tournament's top scorer while Colombia secured third place and qualification for the 2025 FIFA U-20 World Cup.

Villarreal subsequently starred for Colombia at the 2025 FIFA U-20 World Cup in Chile. He scored twice in a 3–1 win over the South Africa U20 in the round of 16 and later netted a hat-trick in the quarter-finals as Colombia defeated the Spain U20 3–2 to reach the semi-finals for only the second time in the nation's history.

== Style of play ==
Villarreal is described by Colombian media as a technically refined, creative midfielder capable of dictating tempo and operating effectively between the lines. A naturally left-footed player, he is recognized for his first touch, spatial awareness, and ability to control rhythm in advanced areas of the pitch. His decision-making and vision under pressure have been cited as traits that distinguish him from most players in his age category.

Coach Alberto Gamero—who oversaw Villarreal's progression at Millonarios—has frequently praised his versatility and intelligence in attack. Gamero stated that “Néiser might be the one with the greatest future among those I’ve had at Millonarios ... he has a lot to play across the front line: centrally, on the left, on the right … Villarreal can do that, play in the attacking front.”

He later described Villarreal as “a gem of Millonarios” and emphasized that “he has the great advantage of knowing how to play across the attacking front, like Mbappé and Vinícius.” Gamero also noted that the midfielder's development accelerated when he was deployed more centrally under Colombia U20 coach César Torres, highlighting how the positional shift unlocked his decision-making and control of tempo.

Media coverage of the 2025 South American U-20 Championship described Villarreal as Colombia's creative hub, lauding his ball retention, vision, and ability to dictate transitions against higher-pressing opponents. Analysts have characterized him as a “hybrid” playmaker capable of functioning as both an interior midfielder and second striker, blending traditional No. 10 creativity with the mobility of a modern attacker. ESPN Colombia has compared aspects of Villarreal's style to James Rodríguez, particularly his left-footed control, passing range, and composure in high-pressure environments. In Brazil, Globo Esporte described him as “one of the biggest promises of Colombian football” following his pre-contract with Cruzeiro, citing his balance of tactical intelligence and technical flair.

== Honours ==
Colombia U20

- FIFA U-20 World Cup third place: 2025

Individual

- FIFA U-20 World Cup Silver Boot: 2025
- South American U-20 Championship Top scorer: 2025
