= Alejandro Severo (footballer) =

Uruguayan footballer (born 2005)

Personal information
- Full name: Jorge Alejandro Severo Cordero
- Date of birth: 27 August 2005 (age 21)
- Place of birth: Artigas, Uruguay
- Height: 1.86 m (6 ft 1 in)
- Position: Winger

Team information
- Current team: Cerro (on loan from Racing de Montevideo)

Youth career
- –2024: Racing de Montevideo

Senior career*
| Years | Team | Apps | (Gls) |
| 2024– | Racing de Montevideo | 22 | (2) |
| 2026– | → Cerro (loan) | 8 | (1) |

International career^{‡}
| 2024– | Uruguay U20 | 9 | (2) |
- * Club domestic league appearances and goals as of 15:40, 26 May 2026 (UTC) ‡ National team caps and goals as of 13:20, 17 February 2025 (UTC)

Jorge Alejandro Severo Cordero (born 27 August 2005) is an Uruguayan professional footballer. He plays in the Uruguayan Primera División as a winger for Cerro, on loan from Racing Club de Montevideo.

== Club career ==
He made his debut as a professional on June 16, 2024, against Peñarol in a 1–1 draw. On the penultimate date of the 2024 Clausura Tournament, he scored his first official goal, in what was a 2–1 victory against Boston River. He scored again the following week in a 2–0 win against Club Atlético River Plate, to finish his debut season with two goals from twelve appearances.

== International career ==
He made his debut for Uruguay U20 on November 12, 2024, in a friendly against Peru U20,at the Gran Parque Central in which they lost 2–1. He was subsequently named in their squad for the 2025 South American U-20 Championship. He played in the tournament as on the right wing. He scored his first goal for the National under-20 side at the tournament in a 6–0 win over Paraguay U20 on 27 January 2025.
