= Jordan Barrera =

Colombian footballer (born 2006)

Personal information
- Full name: Jordan Andrés Barrera Herrera
- Date of birth: 11 April 2006 (age 20)
- Place of birth: Soledad, Colombia
- Height: 1.72 m (5 ft 8 in)
- Position: Midfielder

Team information
- Current team: Botafogo
- Number: 14

Youth career
- Atlético Junior
- 2016–2017: → Santo Tomás
- 2022–2023: Barranquilla

Senior career*
Years	Team	Apps	(Gls)
2023–2025	Atlético Junior	15	(1)
2023–2024	→ Barranquilla (loan)	38	(3)
2025–	Botafogo	20	(1)

International career^{‡}
- Colombia U15
2022–	Colombia U17	5	(2)
Medal record
Men's football
Representing Colombia
FIFA U-20 World Cup
Third place	2025 Chile
South American U-20 Championship
Third place	2025 Venezuela
- * Club domestic league appearances and goals as of 8 April 2026 ‡ National team caps and goals as of 2 April 2023

Jordan Andrés Barrera Herrera (born 11 April 2006) is a Colombian professional footballer who plays as a midfielder for Campeonato Brasileiro Série A club Botafogo.

== Early life ==
Barrera was born in Villa Katanga, Soledad.

== Club career ==
Barrera started his career with Atlético Junior, but would also compete in tournaments for Santo Tomás in 2016 and 2017. He also represented the Atlántico Department in the 2020 and 2022 seasons, winning the national under-15 title in the latter. At the age of fifteen, Barrera trained with the first team of Atlético Junior.

Later in 2022, he signed his first professional contract with Atlético Junior's reserve team, Barranquilla.

On 24 July 2025, Barrera was officially presented as Botafogo's new player.

== International career ==
Barrera was called up to the Colombia under-17 team for a friendly against Chile, in preparation for the 2023 South American U-17 Championship, and managed a goal and an assist in a 2–0 win. In another preparation game, he scored in a 1–1 draw with Peru.

He was then called up for the tournament itself, and impressed with his dribbling and skills in the first game against Uruguay, although the match finished 0–0.

== Style of play ==
A player renowned for his dribbling ability, Barrera has drawn comparisons to Brazilian international Neymar.

== Career statistics ==
As of 16 May 2023.

Appearances and goals by club, season and competition
Club	Season	League			National cup		Other		Total	
Club	Season	Division	Apps	Goals	Apps	Goals	Apps	Goals	Apps	Goals
Atlético Junior	2023	Categoría Primera A	1	0	0	0	0	0	1	0
Career total			1	0	0	0	0	0	1	0

== Honours ==
Colombia U20

- FIFA U-20 World Cup third place: 2025
