= Ignacio Vázquez (politician) =

Spanish politician

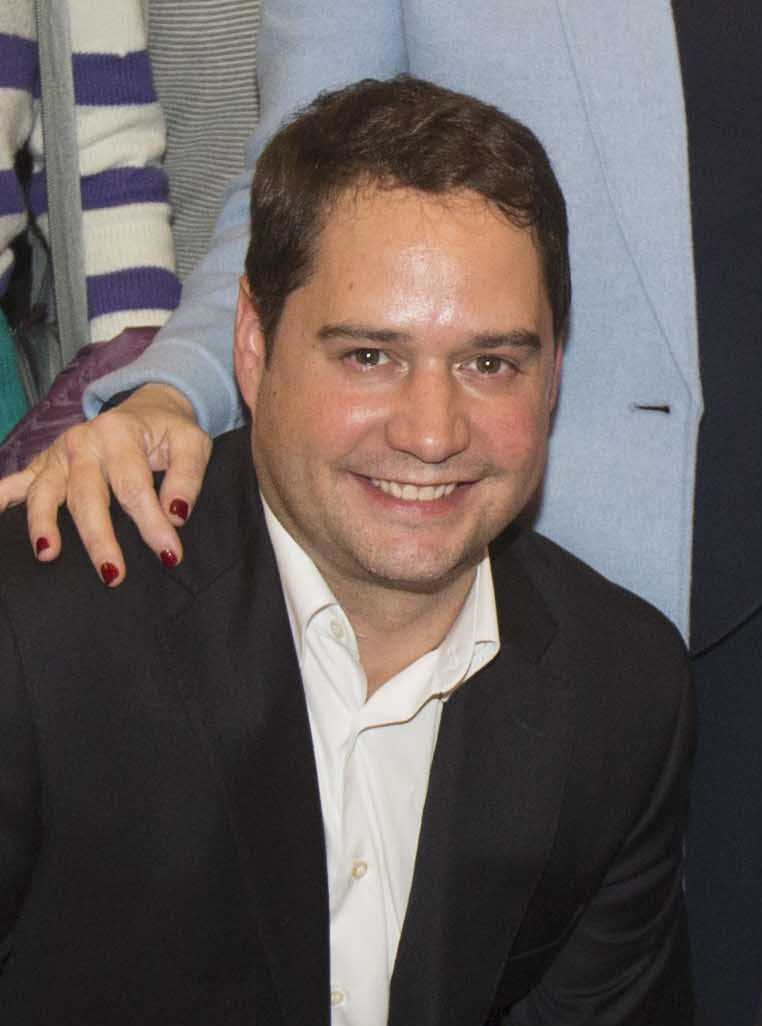

Ignacio Vázquez Casavilla (born 5 April 1977) is a Spanish People's Party (PP) politician. He was elected to the city council of Torrejón de Ardoz in the Community of Madrid in 2007 and was mayor from 2015 to 2023.

== Biography ==
Vázquez graduated with a law degree from King Juan Carlos University and also has a master's degree in tax law from the Centro de Estudios Financieros. After serving two terms as third deputy mayor, he was elected mayor of Torrejón de Ardoz in the Community of Madrid in the 2015 local elections, succeeding Pedro Rollán who had left to be regional minister of transport.

Torrejón de Ardoz had been under the local control of the Spanish Socialist Workers' Party (PSOE) until 2007, but in 2019 Vázquez received 58% of the vote and 19 out of 27 seats on the council, five more than in 2015. He was the most successful PP mayor in the elections, and second overall after Abel Caballero of Vigo for the PSOE. Vázquez ran a campaign without using the name or branding of his party.

In 2023, Vázquez won the highest percentage of votes of any mayor of a city with more than 100,000 inhabitants (66%) and increased the PP seats on the council to 21 out of 27. As in 2019, his list included independents such as boxer Miriam Gutiérrez who was councillor in charge of women. Installations during his mandate included a Christmas theme park, the Oasiz shopping centre and an Ikea store.

On 28 July 2023, two months after his third election as mayor of Torrejón de Ardoz, Vázquez resigned to be the regional minister in charge of the Madrid Metro.
