= Deportivo Táchira F.C. =

Association football club in Venezuela

Deportivo Táchira
- Full name: Deportivo Táchira Fútbol Club
- Nicknames: Aurinegro (Gold-and-black); El Carrusel Aurinegro (The Gold-and-black Carrousel)
- Founded: 11 January 1974; 52 years ago
- Ground: Estadio Polideportivo de Pueblo Nuevo; San Cristóbal, Venezuela
- Capacity: 42,500
- Chairman: Jorge Silva
- Manager: Álvaro Recoba
- League: Liga FUTVE
- 2025: Liga FUTVE, 3rd of 14
- Website: www.deportivotachira.com
Home colours	Away colours	Third colours

Deportivo Táchira Fútbol Club is a professional football club of the city of San Cristóbal, Venezuela. Founded on 11 January 1974, by Gaetano Greco, the club was originally known as "San Cristóbal Fútbol Club".

The club plays its home matches at the Polideportivo de Pueblo Nuevo, which has a capacity of 42,500. Since 1975, it participates in the Venezuelan Primera División, making it the only Venezuelan team that has never fallen or participated in the lower category. Currently it holds the first position of the historical classification of the Venezuelan Primera División with 2229 points.

At the international level, Táchira is the Venezuelan club with the most appearances in the Copa Libertadores. Its best international participation was its advance to the quarter-finals unbeaten in the Copa Libertadores 2004. It is one of two Venezuelan clubs that have advanced past the first phase of the Copa Libertadores, or reached the quarter-finals.

It also has a Futsal team called Deportivo Tachira Fútsal Club, which plays in the Venezuelan Futsal League and the Superior Futsal Tournament.

Táchira's main rival is Caracas FC, with whom it contests the "Clásico Moderno" of Venezuelan football. It also plays the so-called "Andean Derby" (Clásico Andino) against Estudiantes de Mérida.

== History ==
In 1970, Italian-born Gaetano Greco founded an amateur club called Juventus in San Cristóbal, named after the Juventus FC. In 1974, Greco noticed that there were no professional football clubs in Táchira, so he decided to found a club in Táchira based on the amateur Juventus club. He and twelve other people founded the club on 11 January of that year, which they named San Cristóbal Fútbol Club. Most of the club's players came from the Juventus club. Initially, the club's colors were blue and white, similar to the Italy national football team kits.

In January 1975, the club changed its colors to yellow and black, because those colors better represented the Táchira state and were the preferred colors of the Uruguayan manager José "Pocho" Gil, as they were the colors of the Uruguayan team Peñarol.

In the 2016 season, Deportivo Táchira drew an average home league attendance of 5,595 in the Apertura and 4,033 in the Clausura, the highest in the domestic league.

=== Naming history ===
Year	Name
1974	San Cristóbal Fútbol Club
1975	Deportivo San Cristóbal Fútbol Club
1978	Deportivo Táchira Fútbol Club
1986	Unión Atlético Táchira
1999	Deportivo Táchira Fútbol Club

== Stadium ==
The club's home stadium is Polideportivo de Pueblo Nuevo, located in San Cristóbal. It has a maximum capacity of 42,500 people.

== Supporters ==
The team's supporters are known as aurinegros ("gold-and-blacks"). The supporters are mainly divided into three groups; La Torcida Aurinegra , La Avalancha Sur, and Comando Sur.

Several of the team's supporters have committed violent acts in the past towards the supporters of opposing teams. One of the most tragic events took place on 17 December 2000, when the club and Caracas drew 2–2, which gave the Copa República Bolivariana de Venezuela's title to Caracas, causing angry supporters of Deportivo Táchira to burn the Caracas team bus.

== Derby ==
Games between Deportivo Táchira and Estudiantes de Mérida are known as the Clásico de Los Andes (meaning Andes' Derby). However, in recent years games between Deportivo Táchira and Caracas have been known as the modern derby, because of the successful performance of both teams. A former rival of Deportivo Táchira in the 1980s and early 1990s was Marítimo de Venezuela, a former team from Caracas.

== Colors ==
Deportivo Táchira's shirt has black and yellow vertical stripes, with black shorts and socks.

== Honours ==
=== National ===
- Primera División
  - Winners (11): 1979, 1981, 1984, 1986, 1999-2000, 2007–08, 2010–11, 2014–15, 2021, 2023, 2024
- Copa Venezuela
  - Winners (2): 1982, 1983

== International Appearances ==
- Copa Libertadores: 25 appearances

1980: First Round
1982: First Round
1983: First Round
1985: First Round
1987: First Round
1988: First Round
1989: Round of 16
1991: Round of 16

2000: Preliminary Round
2001: First Round
2004: Quarter-finals
2005: Second Round
2006: First Round
2007: First Round
2009: Second Round
2010: First Round

2011: Second Round
2012: Second Round
2015: Second Round
2016: Round of 16
2017: First Round
2018: First Round
2020: First Round
2021: Second Round
2022: Second Round

- Copa Sudamericana: 5 appearances

2002: Preliminary Round
2012: Preliminary Round
2021: Round of 16
2022: Quarter-finals
2023: First round

- Copa CONMEBOL: 3 appearances

1993: First Round
1996: First Round
1997: First Round

- Deportivo Táchira is the Venezuelan club with the most Copa Libertadores appearances and the most runner-up finishes in the Venezuelan league. It has won nine national championships.
- The club's best Copa Libertadores participation was in 2004, when the club became the second team to qualify for the quarter-finals of the competition without losing a match, having played against strong teams such as River Plate (Argentina), Libertad (Paraguay), Deportes Tolima (Colombia), and Nacional (Uruguay), before facing São Paulo (Brazil) in the quarter-finals.

== Current squad ==
As of 5 November 2026

Note: Flags indicate national team as defined under FIFA eligibility rules; some limited exceptions apply. Players may hold more than one non-FIFA nationality.

No.	Pos.	Nation	Player
1	GK	VEN	Alejandro Araque
2	DF	VEN	Juan David Sánchez
3	DF	ARG	Lautaro Lusnig
4	DF	URU	Guillermo Fratta
6	DF	VEN	Adrián Montañez
7	FW	VEN	Adalberto Peñaranda
9	FW	URU	Rodrigo Pollero
10	MF	VEN	Carlos Sosa
11	FW	ARG	Álex Woiski
13	DF	VEN	Pablo Camacho (captain)
15	MF	VEN	Brayan Palmezano
17	FW	VEN	José Balza
19	FW	VEN	Alexander Rondón
20	MF	VEN	Carlos Calzadilla
21	FW	URU	Valentín Adamo

No.	Pos.	Nation	Player
23	MF	VEN	Óscar Hernández
24	MF	VEN	Jeferson Caraballo
25	MF	URU	Agustín Pérez
27	FW	VEN	Luis Zúñiga
30	GK	VEN	Edwin Vargas
31	MF	VEN	Carlos Méndez
37	FW	VEN	Jesús Duarte
38	MF	VEN	Gustavo Lozano
41	DF	VEN	Wilder Wilches
43	MF	VEN	Manuel Roa
44	DF	VEN	Edicson Tamiche
45	DF	VEN	Franco Provenzano
46	FW	VEN	Juan Aguilar
70	FW	VEN	Heiderber Ramírez
88	DF	VEN	Delvin Alfonzo

=== Out on loan ===
Note: Flags indicate national team as defined under FIFA eligibility rules; some limited exceptions apply. Players may hold more than one non-FIFA nationality.

No.	Pos.	Nation	Player

== Notable players ==
- (Venezuela) Tomás Rincón (2008)
- (Venezuela) Cesar "El Maestrico" Gonzalez
- (Uruguay) Daniel Francovig
- (Venezuela) Carlos Maldonado

== Head coaches ==
- (Uruguay) Luis Miloc (1977–78)
- (Uruguay) Esteban Beracochea (1978–83) (Campeón 79 y 81)
- (Peru) Marcos Calderón (1983)
- (Argentina) Carlos Horacio Moreno (1984–89) (Campeón 84 y 86)
- (Venezuela) Richard Páez (1991)
- (Uruguay) Walter Roque (1999–01) (Campeón 99-00)
- (Venezuela) César Farías (2003–05)
- (Venezuela) Manuel Plasencia (2005–07)
- (Venezuela) Carlos Maldonado (2007–2010) (Campeón 07-08)
- (Colombia) Jorge Luis Pinto (2010–2011) (Campeón 10-11)
- (Venezuela) Jesús Vera (2011)
- (Colombia) Jaime de la Pava (2012)
- (Venezuela) Manuel Contreras (2012)
- (Venezuela) Daniel Farías (2013–2015) (Campeón 14-15)
- (Venezuela) Carlos Maldonado (2015–2016)
- (Colombia) Santiago Escobar (2016-2017)
- (Venezuela) Francesco Stifano (2017-2018)
- (Spain) Álex Pallares (2018)
- (Venezuela) Giovanny Pérez (2019)
- (Venezuela) Juan Domingo Tolisano (2019-2021) (Campeón 2021)
- (Spain) Álex Pallares (2022)
- (Venezuela) Eduardo Saragó (2022–2024)
