= Gustavo Prado =

Brazilian footballer

Personal information
- Full name: Gustavo Prado Alves
- Date of birth: 6 June 2005 (age 21)
- Place of birth: Rio de Janeiro, Brazil
- Height: 1.79 m (5 ft 10 in)
- Position: Midfielder

Team information
- Current team: Dynamo Kyiv (on loan from Internacional)
- Number: 47

Youth career
- Madureira (futsal)
- 2021–2023: Ferroviária
- 2023–2024: Internacional

Senior career*
Years	Team	Apps	(Gls)
2024–	Internacional	53	(2)
2026	→ Ceará (loan)	3	(0)
2026–	→ Dynamo Kyiv (loan)	0	(0)

International career
2025	Brazil U20	7	(1)
Medal record
Men's football
Representing Brazil
South American U-20 Championship
Winner	2025 Venezuela
- * Club domestic league appearances and goals as of 13 December 2025

Gustavo Prado Alves (born 6 June 2005) is a Brazilian professional footballer who plays as a midfielder for Ukrainian club Dynamo Kyiv, on loan from Internacional.

== Club career ==
Born in Rio de Janeiro, Gustavo Prado joined Internacional's youth setup on 18 February 2023, from Ferroviária. In February 2024, after impressing with the former's under-20 side, he was promoted to the first team.

Prado made his senior debut on 3 February 2024, coming on as a second-half substitute for Bruno Henrique in a 2–0 Campeonato Gaúcho home win over Caxias. He made his Série A debut on 13 April, replacing Maurício late into a 2–1 home win over Bahia.

On 4 September 2026, Prado joined Ukrainian club Dynamo Kyiv on loan until the end of the season.

== International career ==
Prado was part of the Brazil national under-20 team squad that won the 2025 South American U-20 Championship.

== Honours ==
Internacional

- Campeonato Gaúcho: 2025

Brazil U20

- South American U-20 Championship: 2025

== Career statistics ==
As of 29 September 2025

Appearances and goals by club, season and competition
Club	Season	League			State League		National Cup		Continental		Other		Total	
Club	Season	Division	Apps	Goals	Apps	Goals	Apps	Goals	Apps	Goals	Apps	Goals	Apps	Goals
Internacional	2024	Série A	13	1	3	0	3	1	3	0	—		22	2
Career total			13	1	3	0	3	1	3	0	0	0	22	2
