= Emiliano Ramos (footballer) =

Chilean footballer

Personal information
- Full name: Emiliano Máximo Ramos Avilés
- Date of birth: 8 March 2005 (age 21)
- Place of birth: Arica, Chile
- Height: 1.79 m (5 ft 10 in)
- Position: Forward

Team information
- Current team: Everton
- Number: 25

Youth career
- Huracán Arica
- 2019–2023: Everton

Senior career*
Years	Team	Apps	(Gls)
2023–	Everton	36	(3)

International career^{‡}
2024–2025	Chile U20	11	(2)
2025–	Chile	1	(0)
- * Club domestic league appearances and goals as of 22 August 2025 ‡ National team caps and goals as of 1 October 2025

Emiliano Máximo Ramos Avilés (born 8 March 2005) is a Chilean footballer who plays as a forward for Chilean Primera División side Everton de Viña del Mar and the Chile national team.

== Club career ==
Born in Arica, Chile, Ramos was with club Huracán Arica before joining the Everton de Viña del Mar youth ranks at the age of 14. He made his senior debut in the 1–2 loss against Magallanes for the Copa Chile on 25 June 2022.

== International career ==
Ramos represented Chile at under-20 level in friendlies and the 2025 South American Championship. Included in the final squad for the 2025 FIFA U20 World Cup, he suffered a serious pulled hamstring in the second match against Japan.

At senior level, Ramos received his first call up for the 2026 FIFA World Cup qualifiers against Brazil and Uruguay in September 2025. He made his debut against Uruguay on 9 September as a starting player.

== Career statistics ==
=== International ===
As of match played 9 September 2025

Appearances and goals by national team and year
National team	Year	Apps	Goals
Chile	2025	1	0
Total		1	0
