= Ángel Aguayo =

Paraguayan footballer (born 2006)

Personal information
- Full name: Ángel Sebastián Aguayo Villasanti
- Date of birth: 30 May 2006 (age 20)
- Place of birth: Asunción, Paraguay
- Height: 1.86 m (6 ft 1 in)
- Position: Midfielder

Team information
- Current team: Sol de América
- Number: 6

Youth career
- Sol de América

Senior career*
Years	Team	Apps	(Gls)
2024–	Sol de América	8	(0)

International career^{‡}
2023	Paraguay U17	9	(1)
2024–	Paraguay U20	9	(2)
- * Club domestic league appearances and goals as of 20:19, 19 May 2025 (UTC) ‡ National team caps and goals as of 16:20, 17 February 2025 (UTC)

Ángel Sebastián Aguayo Villasanti (born 30 May 2006) is a Paraguayan professional footballer who plays as a midfielder for Sol de América and the Paraguay under-20 national team.

== Club career ==
=== Sol de América ===
Aguayo joined Sol de América's youth sides after a failed trial at Olimpia. After progressing through the youth categories, he made his first team debut on 7 September 2024, coming on as a second-half substitute for Ronald Roa in a 2–0 away win over Sportivo Limpeño, for the year's Copa Paraguay.

Aguayo made his Primera División debut on 11 September 2024, replacing Víctor Barrios in a 1–0 home loss to Libertad. He featured in one further league match, starting in a 1–0 home win over Sportivo Ameliano on 29 November, as his side was already relegated.

In February 2025, Aguayo was linked to a possible move to Brazilian club Santos, for a rumoured fee of US$ 400,000 for 80% of his economic rights. The player himself confirmed the negotiations on 17 February, during an interview to a local radio, and despite already training with the squad, the deal later collapsed.

== International career ==
On 11 September 2022, Aguayo was called up to the Paraguay national under-17 team for a period of training. The following 14 March, he was included in the squad for the 2023 South American U-17 Championship, and was a regular starter during the competition.

On 9 January 2025, Aguayo was called up to the under-20 team for the 2025 South American U-20 Championship. He was also a first-choice in the tournament, scoring twice in seven matches.

== Career statistics ==
As of 19 May 2025.

Club	Season	League			Cup		Continental		Other		Total	
Club	Season	Division	Apps	Goals	Apps	Goals	Apps	Goals	Apps	Goals	Apps	Goals
Sol de América	2024	Primera División	2	0	1	0	—		—		3	0
Sol de América	2025	División Intermedia	6	0	0	0	—		—		6	0
Career total			8	0	1	0	0	0	0	0	9	0
