= Agustín Arce =

Chilean footballer

Personal information
- Full name: Agustín Matías Arce Melli
- Date of birth: 24 January 2005 (age 21)
- Place of birth: Lampa, Chile
- Height: 1.79 m (5 ft 10 in)
- Position: Midfielder

Team information
- Current team: Universidad de Chile
- Number: 28

Youth career
- Universidad de Chile La Reina
- Universidad de Chile

Senior career*
Years	Team	Apps	(Gls)
2022–	Universidad de Chile	9	(1)
2024	→ San Luis (loan)	2	(0)
2025	→ Deportes Limache (loan)	9	(0)

International career^{‡}
2024–2025	Chile U20	12	(1)
2025–	Chile	2	(0)
- * Club domestic league appearances and goals as of 9 June 2026 ‡ National team caps and goals as of 9 June 2026

Agustín Matías Arce Melli (born 24 January 2005) is a Chilean footballer who plays as a midfielder for Chilean Primera División side Universidad de Chile and the Chile national team.

== Club career ==
Born in Lampa, Chile, Arce was with Universidad de Chile La Reina as a youth player. A product of the Universidad de Chile youth system, he made his senior debut under Diego López in the 1–0 win against Cobresal for the Copa Chile on 23 August 2022.

In August 2024, Arce was loaned out to San Luis de Quillota in the Chilean second level. Back to Universidad de Chile for the 2025 season, he was loaned out to Deportes Limache in the Chilean top level in August 2025.

== International career ==
Arce represented the Chile national U20 team in friendlies and both the 2025 South American Championship and the 2025 FIFA World Cup.

Following the 2025 FIFA U20 World Cup, Arce was called up to the Chile senior team for the match against Peru on 10 October 2025. He made his debut in the friendly against Russia on 15 November 2025.

== Career statistics ==
=== International ===
As of match played 15 November 2025

Appearances and goals by national team and year
National team	Year	Apps	Goals
Chile	2025	1	0
Total		1	0
