= Germán Barbas =

Uruguayan footballer (born 2007)

Personal information
- Full name: Germán Barbas Díaz
- Date of birth: 17 September 2007 (age 19)
- Place of birth: Montevideo, Uruguay
- Height: 1.79 m (5 ft 10 in)
- Position: Midfielder

Team information
- Current team: Peñarol
- Number: 18

Youth career
- 2013–2019: Club Náutico
- 2019–2024: Peñarol

Senior career*
Years	Team	Apps	(Gls)
2024–	Peñarol	3	(0)

International career^{‡}
2024–	Uruguay U20	26	(5)
- * Club domestic league appearances and goals as of 05:00, 17 May 2026 (UTC) ‡ National team caps and goals as of 05:00, 17 February 2025 (UTC)

Germán Barbas Díaz (born 17 September 2007) is a Uruguayan professional footballer who plays as a midfielder for Uruguayan Primera División club Peñarol.

== Club career ==
A youth product of Club Náutico, Barbas moved to the academy of Peñarol in 2019 at the age of 12. He signed his first professional contract with the club on 2 May 2024, extending until December 2026.

He made his senior and professional debut with Peñarol as a substitute in a 3–1 league win over Progreso on 24 May 2024. At 16 years, 8 months, and 7 days old, Barbas became the second-youngest debutant for the club in league's history, behind Coquito.

== International career ==
Barbas represented the Uruguay U20 at the 2024 L'Alcúdia International Football Tournament, scoring the only goal in the final to secure a victory over the Argentina U20. In January 2025, he was named in Uruguay's 23-man squad for the 2025 South American U-20 Championship.

In March 2025, Barbas received his first call-up to the Uruguay national team. In June 2026, he was selected as a training player to accompany the squad to the 2026 FIFA World Cup.

== Playing style ==
A versatile midfielder with a powerful shot, Barbas has drawn comparisons to his compatriot Federico Valverde.

== Honours ==
Peñarol

- Uruguayan Primera División: 2024
- Copa Uruguay: 2025
