= Agustín Ruberto =

Argentine footballer (born 2006)

Personal information
- Full name: Agustín Fabián Ruberto
- Date of birth: 14 January 2006 (age 20)
- Place of birth: Buenos Aires, Argentina
- Height: 1.84 m (6 ft 0 in)
- Position: Forward

Team information
- Current team: River Plate
- Number: 32

Youth career
- 2010–2011: Barrio Nuevo
- 2011–2025: River Plate

Senior career*
Years	Team	Apps	(Gls)
2024–	River Plate	18	(1)

International career
2022	Argentina U16	4	(3)
2022–2023	Argentina U17	17	(10)
Medal record
Men's football
Representing Argentina
South American U-20 Championship
Runner-up	2025 Venezuela
- * Club domestic league appearances and goals as of 18:03, 10 July 2026 (UTC)

Agustín Fabián Ruberto (born 14 January 2006) is an Argentine professional footballer who plays as a forward for Argentine Primera División club River Plate.

== Club career ==
Born in the city of Buenos Aires, Ruberto first took an interest in football from the age of four, when he joined local youth side Barrio Nuevo in the San Fernando Partido of Buenos Aires Province. After almost two seasons, he impressed a scout from another youth side named Parque Chas at a youth tournament. Parque Chas' goalkeeper was a close friend of Ruberto, and after the scout helped to arranged a trial at professional side River Plate for the goalkeeper, Ruberto was invited to join him.

After three days of trialling, he was offered a place in the River Plate academy. Initially a central defender, he was converted to play as a centre-forward by River's youth coaches, who noticed his physical and technical ability. This change was beneficial for both River Plate and Ruberto, as he established himself as a prolific goal-scorer in the club's academy. Following the break from football due to the COVID-19 pandemic in Argentina, Ruberto returned to action scoring seventeen goals in fourteen games in the 2021 season. He was rewarded for his good form with a professional contract in April 2022 - a deal running through December 2024.

The following year, having been promoted to the club's reserve team, he drew interest from English Premier League side Brighton & Hove Albion.

In 2024's first week, the striker renew his contract with River Plate until December 2027. This new contract includes an update with an increase release clause of €30,000,000, being the highest release clause in the squad.

The forward scored his first goal for the senior River Plate squad, in his second appearance against Barracas Central, just 15 minutes after being substituted into the match.

== International career ==
In April 2022, Ruberto was called up to the Argentinian under-16 team for the 2022 edition of the Montaigu Tournament, where he scored three goals in four appearances as Argentina finished second.

At the 2023 South American U-17 Championship, Ruberto started Argentina's campaign with two goals in a 4–2 win against Venezuela, before scoring against Peru in a 3–0 win. Following the tournament, in which Argentina finished third, he scored in a 1–0 friendly win against Mexico, in preparation for the 2023 FIFA U-17 World Cup.

At the 2023 FIFA U-17 World Cup, Ruberto scored in each of Argentina's first two games, against Senegal in a 2–1 loss and then the third in a 3–1 win against Japan. In the semi-finals against Germany, Ruberto scored a last-minute goal to equalize 3–3, completing his hat-trick, only for Argentina to lose on penalties. In the entirety of the tournament, Ruberto scored 8 goals, winning the golden boot.

== Honours ==
Individual

- FIFA U-17 World Cup Golden Boot: 2023
