= Deivid Washington =

Brazilian footballer (born 2005)

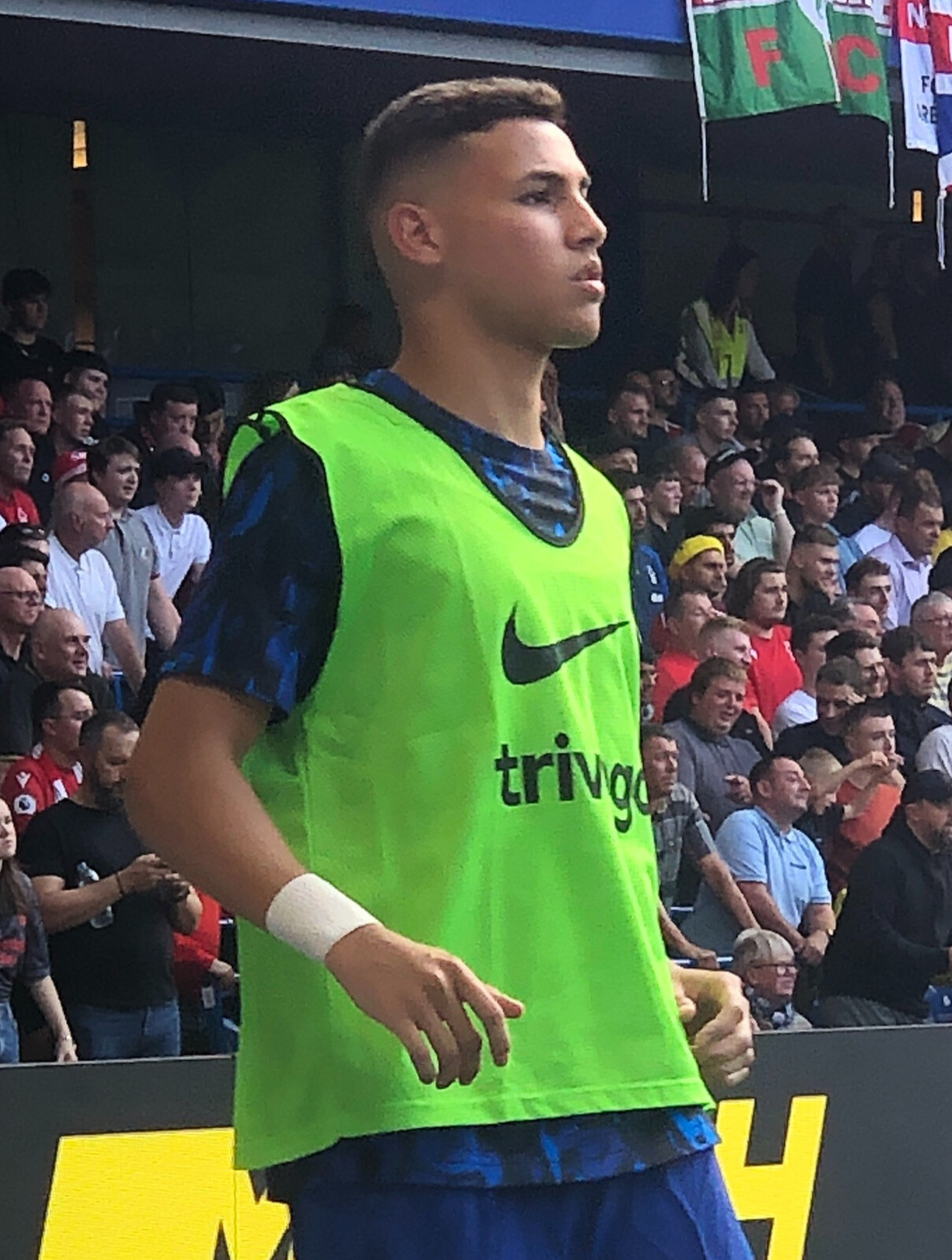
- Deivid warming up for Chelsea in 2023

Personal information
- Full name: Deivid Washington de Souza Eugênio
- Date of birth: 5 June 2005 (age 21)
- Place of birth: Itumbiara, Brazil
- Height: 1.87 m (6 ft 2 in)
- Position: Forward

Team information
- Current team: Strasbourg
- Number: 42

Youth career
- 2013–2016: Grêmio
- 2016–2023: Santos

Senior career*
Years	Team	Apps	(Gls)
2023	Santos	9	(2)
2023–2026	Chelsea	2	(0)
2025	→ Santos (loan)	18	(1)
2026–	Strasbourg	0	(0)

International career^{‡}
2025–	Brazil U20	9	(4)
Medal record
Men's football
Representing Brazil
South American U-20 Championship
Winner	2025 Venezuela
- * Club domestic league appearances and goals as of 21:16, 2 September 2025 (UTC) ‡ National team caps and goals as of 20:20, 27 July 2025 (UTC)

Deivid Washington de Souza Eugênio (born 5 June 2005), known as Deivid Washington or simply Deivid, is a Brazilian professional footballer who plays as a forward for Ligue 1 club Strasbourg.

== Club career ==
=== Santos ===
Born in Itumbiara, Goiás, Deivid first joined Grêmio as an eight year old, before moving to Santos three years later. It was the former Brazil international Marcos Assunção that introduced him to the club from the São Paulo state, where he started making an impression in the Campeonato Brasileiro Sub-17.

At the age of 16, Deivid signed his first professional contract with the club, reportedly including a R$ 100 million release clause, tying him to the club for the next three years. In 2022, he was the top scorer of the Campeonato Paulista Sub-17, with 16 goals, whilst also scoring another six goals in the Campeonato Brasileiro of this age grade.

Deivid has also been playing with the under-20s since 2021: he scored 17 goals between state and national tournaments in 2022. He also started the 2023 season as a first-choice with the under-20 team, playing in the Copa São Paulo de Futebol Júnior.

After Santos' elimination from the 2023 Campeonato Paulista, Deivid began training with the first team under head coach Odair Hellmann, and was called up to the club's 2023 Copa Sudamericana opener against Blooming in Bolivia. He made his professional debut on 11 April 2023, coming on as a late substitute for fellow youth graduate Marcos Leonardo in a 2–0 away win over Botafogo-SP, for the year's Copa do Brasil.

On 17 April 2023, Deivid renewed his contract with Santos until April 2026. He scored his first professional goal on 10 May, netting the opener in a 3–0 Série A home win over Bahia.

=== Chelsea ===
On 24 August 2023, Santos confirmed the transfer of Deivid to Premier League club Chelsea, signing a seven-year contract with the option of a further year. He made his Premier league debut on 28 October 2023, a game that Chelsea lost 2–0 to Brentford.

==== Return to Santos (loan) ====
On 20 February 2025, Deivid returned to Santos on loan until December 2025. On 1 September, he was sent back to his parent club due to his lack of impact.

=== Strasbourg ===
On 1 September 2026, Deivid signed a five-year contract with Ligue 1 side Strasbourg.

== Career statistics ==
As of 28 October 2025

Appearances and goals by club, season and competition
Club	Season	League			State league (Note: Includes Campeonato Paulista)		National cup (Note: Includes Copa do Brasil, FA Cup, Coupe de France)		League cup		Continental		Other		Total	
Club	Season	Division	Apps	Goals	Apps	Goals	Apps	Goals	Apps	Goals	Apps	Goals	Apps	Goals	Apps	Goals
Santos	2023	Série A	9	2	—		3	0	—		4 (Note: Appearances in Copa Sudamericana)	0	—		16	2
Chelsea	2023–24	Premier League	2	0	—		1	0	0	0	—		—		3	0
Chelsea U21	2024–25	—			—		—		—		—		2 (Note: Appearances in EFL Trophy)	0	2	0
Chelsea U21	2025–26	—			—		—		—		—		1	0	1	0
Chelsea U21	Total		—		—		—		—		—		3	0	3	0
Santos (loan)	2025	Série A	17	1	1	0	2	0	—		—		—		20	1
Strasbourg	2026–27	Ligue 1	0	0	—		0	0	—		—		—		0	0
Career total			28	3	1	0	6	0	0	0	4	0	3	0	42	3

== Honours ==
Santos

- Campeonato Paulista Sub-20: 2022

Brazil U20

- South American Youth Football Championship: 2025
