= Juan Rodríguez (footballer, born 2005) =

Uruguayan footballer (born 2005)

Personal information
- Full name: Juan Martín Rodríguez Camejo
- Date of birth: 30 May 2005 (age 21)
- Place of birth: San Ramón, Uruguay
- Height: 1.90 m (6 ft 3 in)
- Positions: Centre-back; left-back

Team information
- Current team: Cagliari
- Number: 15

Youth career
- Huracán de San Ramón
- Peñarol

Senior career*
Years	Team	Apps	(Gls)
2024–2025	Peñarol	12	(0)
2024	→ Boston River (loan)	23	(0)
2025–	Cagliari	28	(1)

International career^{‡}
2022	Uruguay U18	2	(0)
2024–2025	Uruguay U20	14	(1)
2024	Uruguay local	1	(0)
2026–	Uruguay	2	(0)
- * Club domestic league appearances and goals as of 7 November 2026 ‡ National team caps and goals as of 18 November 2026

Juan Martín Rodríguez Camejo (born 30 May 2005) is a Uruguayan professional footballer who plays as a centre-back or left-back for Serie A club Cagliari and the Uruguay national team.

== Club career ==
Rodríguez started his career with Huracán de San Ramón before joining the youth academy of Peñarol. In January 2024, he joined Boston River on a season-long loan deal.

On 1 September 2025, Rodríguez joined Italian Serie A club Cagliari on a five-year contract. He scored his first goal on 24 May 2026 in a 2–1 league win over AC Milan, securing his club's first away victory against the latter since 1997.

== International career ==
In August 2022, Rodríguez was called up to the Uruguay under-18 team for a friendly tournament which was held in Japan. In May 2024, Uruguay local team head coach Diego Pérez called up Rodríguez for the team's first ever match.

In November 2024, Rodríguez received his first call-up to the Uruguay national team when head coach Marcelo Bielsa included him in the squad for the 2026 FIFA World Cup qualification matches against Colombia and Brazil. In January 2025, he was named in Uruguay's 23-man squad for the 2025 South American U-20 Championship.

In September 2026, newly appointed Uruguay head coach Diego Forlán included Rodríguez in the squad for friendly matches against Japan, South Korea, and India. Rodríguez made his debut for the Uruguay national team on 6 October 2026 in a 6–1 victory over India.

== Personal life ==
Rodríguez idolized Lionel Messi, Diego Forlán, Luis Suárez and Edinson Cavani in the early part of his youth career as he played as a forward. Since moving to the centre-back position, he considers Virgil van Dijk and José María Giménez as his references.

== Career statistics ==
=== Club ===
As of match played 7 November 2026

Appearances and goals by club, season and competition
Club	Season	League			Cup (Note: Includes Copa Uruguay, Coppa Italia)		Continental		Other		Total	
Club	Season	Division	Apps	Goals	Apps	Goals	Apps	Goals	Apps	Goals	Apps	Goals
Peñarol	2024	Liga AUF Uruguaya	0	0	0	0	0	0	0	0	0	0
Peñarol	2025	Liga AUF Uruguaya	12	0	1	0	0	0	0	0	13	0
Peñarol	Total		12	0	1	0	0	0	0	0	13	0
Boston River (loan)	2024	Liga AUF Uruguaya	23	0	1	0	—		—		24	0
Cagliari	2025–26	Serie A	17	1	1	0	—		—		18	1
Cagliari	2026–27	Serie A	11	0	2	0	—		—		13	0
Cagliari	Total		28	1	3	0	0	0	0	0	31	1
Career total			63	1	5	0	0	0	0	0	68	1

=== International ===
As of match played 17 November 2026

Appearances and goals by national team and year
National team	Year	Apps	Goals
Uruguay	2026	2	0
Total		2	0

== Honours ==
Peñarol

- Copa Uruguay: 2025

Individual

- Uruguayan Primera División team of the season: 2024
