= David Fernández (footballer, born 2006) =

Paraguayan footballer

Personal information
- Full name: David Emanuel Fernández Fariña
- Date of birth: 30 January 2006 (age 20)
- Place of birth: Ñemby, Paraguay
- Height: 1.84 m (6 ft 0 in)
- Position: Forward

Team information
- Current team: O'Higgins

Youth career
- Sol de América

Senior career*
| Years | Team | Apps | (Gls) |
| 2023–2025 | Sol de América | 32 | (2) |
| 2023 | → Sportivo Trinidense (loan) | 16 | (2) |
| 2025–2026 | Defensa y Justicia | 3 | (0) |
| 2026– | O'Higgins | 0 | (0) |

International career
| 2023 | Paraguay U17 | 7 | (0) |
| 2025 | Paraguay U20 | 12 | (1) |
- * Club domestic league appearances and goals as of 2 August 2026

David Emanuel Fernández Fariña (born 30 January 2006) is a Paraguayan professional footballer who plays as a forward for Chilean club O'Higgins.

== Club career ==
Born in Ñemby, Paraguay, Fernández is a product of Sol de América. In 2023, he was loaned out to Sportivo Trinidense with whom he made his professional debut.

In October 2025, Fernández moved to Argentina and signed with Defensa y Justicia. The next year, he was included in the first team.

In August 2026, Fernández moved to Chile and signed with O'Higgins.

== International career ==
Acosta represented Paraguay at under-17 level in the 2023 South American Championship. In 2025, he represented the under-20's at both the 2025 South American Championship and the 2025 FIFA World Cup.
