= Bianneider Tamayo =

Venezuelan footballer

Personal information
- Full name: Bianneider Nauj Tamayo Escalona
- Date of birth: 13 January 2005 (age 21)
- Place of birth: Cabudare, Venezuela
- Height: 1.85 m (6 ft 1 in)
- Position: Defender

Team information
- Current team: Universidad de Chile

Youth career
- 2020–2023: Caracas

Senior career*
Years	Team	Apps	(Gls)
2023–2024	Caracas	16	(0)
2024–	Universidad de Chile	4	(1)
2025	→ Unión Española (loan)	12	(0)

International career
2024–2025	Venezuela U20	6	(1)
2024–	Venezuela U23		
- * Club domestic league appearances and goals as of 15 December 2025

Bianneider Nauj Tamayo Escalona (born 13 January 2005) is a Venezuelan professional footballer who plays as a defender for Chilean club Universidad de Chile.

== Club career ==
Born in Los Rastrojos town, Cabudare, Venezuela, Tamayo joined the Caracas under-15 team in 2020. After winning the national under-20 championship in 2021 and 2022 and taking part in the U20 Copa Libertadores in 2022 and 2023, he made his professional debut in the 1–1 away draw against Portuguesa on 2 September 2023.

In September 2024, Tamayo moved abroad and signed with Universidad de Chile. He made his debut with them in the 1–3 away win against Magallanes on 5 April 2025 for the Copa Chile. In July 2025, he was loaned out to Unión Española until the end of the year. In October 2025, he was selected by the CIES Football Observatory as the third South American U21 player with the most ball recoveries per 90 minutes.

== International career ==
Tamayo represented the Venezuela under-20 team in the 2025 South American Championship and some friendlies. He also was part of the Venezuela under-23 squad in the 2024 Pre-Olympic Tournament.

At senior level, Tamayo was called up to the Venezuela squad for 2026 FIFA World Cup qualification matches during 2024.
