= Igor Serrote =

Brazilian footballer

Personal information
- Full name: Igor Eduardo Schlemper
- Date of birth: 1 March 2005 (age 21)
- Place of birth: Balneário Camboriú, Brazil
- Height: 1.80 m (5 ft 11 in)
- Position: Right-back

Team information
- Current team: Al Jazira
- Number: 2

Youth career
- 2015–2025: Grêmio

Senior career*
Years	Team	Apps	(Gls)
2024–2025	Grêmio	12	(0)
2025–	Al Jazira	1	(0)

International career^{‡}
2025–	Brazil U20	8	(0)
Medal record
Men's football
Representing Brazil
South American U-20 Championship
Winner	2025 Venezuela
- * Club domestic league appearances and goals as of 13:26, 1 April 2025 (UTC) ‡ National team caps and goals as of 13:26, 1 April 2025 (UTC)

Igor Eduardo Schlemper (born 1 March 2005), known as Igor Serrote or just Igor, is a Brazilian professional footballer who plays as a right-back for Al Jazira.

== Club career ==
=== Grêmio ===
Born in Balneário Camboriú, Santa Catarina, Igor joined Grêmio's youth sides in 2015, aged ten; he was then nicknamed Serrote (handsaw in English) due to his mohawk hairstyle which reminded of a hacksaw. He signed his first professional contract with the club in March 2021, after agreeing to a three-year deal.

Igor made his first team – and Série A – debut on 28 September 2024, coming on as a late substitute for Edenilson in a 0–0 away draw against Botafogo.

=== Al Jazira ===
On 9 August 2025, Serrote joined Al Jazira in the United Arab Emirates.

== International career ==
In October 2024, Igor was called up to the Brazil national under-20 team, but later withdrew due to his first team commitments with his club.

== Career statistics ==
As of 24 October 2024

Appearances and goals by club, season and competition
Club	Season	League			State League		National Cup		Continental		Other		Total	
Club	Season	Division	Apps	Goals	Apps	Goals	Apps	Goals	Apps	Goals	Apps	Goals	Apps	Goals
Grêmio	2024	Série A	5	0	0	0	0	0	0	0	—		5	0
Grêmio	2025	Série A	1	0	1	0	0	0	0	0	—		2	0
Career total			6	0	1	0	0	0	0	0	0	0	7	0

== Honours ==
Grêmio

- Campeonato Gaúcho: 2024
- Recopa Gaúcha: 2025

Brazil U20

- South American U-20 Championship: 2025
