= Juan Pablo Goicochea =

Peruvian footballer (born 2005)

Personal information
- Full name: Juan Pablo Goicochea del Carpio
- Date of birth: 12 January 2005 (age 21)
- Place of birth: Lima, Peru
- Height: 1.81 m (5 ft 11 in)
- Position: Forward

Team information
- Current team: Defensor Sporting (on loan from Platense)
- Number: 97

Youth career
- Esther Grande
- 2018–2022: Alianza Lima

Senior career*
Years	Team	Apps	(Gls)
2022–2024	Alianza Lima	4	(0)
2024–	Platense	1	(0)
2026–	→ Defensor Sporting (loan)	2	(0)

International career^{‡}
2022–2025	Peru U20	28	(6)
2022–2024	Peru U23	8	(1)
2026–	Peru	1	(0)
- * Club domestic league appearances and goals as of 18:17, 12 March 2026 (UTC) ‡ National team caps and goals as of 16:05, 2 April 2026 (UTC)

Juan Pablo Goicochea del Carpio (born 12 January 2005) is a Peruvian footballer who plays as a forward for Defensor Sporting, on loan from Platense, and the Peru national team.

== Club career ==
Born in Lima, Goicochea started his career with Esther Grande, staying until the club folded in 2018, before joining Alianza Lima. His debut for Alianza was reportedly delayed due to interest from Brazilian clubs Grêmio and Botafogo. He began training with the Alianza first team in October 2022, and made his debut just a week later.

== International career ==
Goicochea has represented Peru at under-20 level. On his eighteenth birthday, while representing Peru in a friendly against Bolivia, he and teammate Kenji Cabrera, as well as two Bolivian players, were sent off following a brawl. He was left with a black eye following a punch from a Bolivian player during the brawl.

== Style of play ==
Known for his physical size, speed of positioning and goal-scoring ability, Goicochea has been labelled as the "new Paolo Guerrero" by press in Peru. He lists Claudio Pizarro, Gabriel Jesus and Jefferson Farfán as players he looks up to and styles his game on.

== Career statistics ==
=== Club ===
As of 29 October 2023.

Club	Division	League			Cup		Continental		Total	
Club	Division	Season	Apps	Goals	Apps	Goals	Apps	Goals	Apps	Goals
Alianza Lima	Liga 1	2022	1	0	–		—		1	0
Alianza Lima	Liga 1	2023	3	0	–		—		3	0
Alianza Lima	Total		4	0	0	0	0	0	4	0
Platense	Primera División	2024	1	0	0	0	–		1	0
Career total			5	0	0	0	0	0	5	0

== Honours ==
Alianza Lima

- Torneo Clausura: 2022
- Liga 1: 2022
- Torneo Apertura: 2023

Platense

- Primera División: 2025 Apertura
