= Maher Carrizo =

Argentine footballer (born 2006)

Personal information
- Full name: Maher Mauricio Carrizo
- Date of birth: 19 February 2006 (age 20)
- Place of birth: Santiago del Estero, Argentina
- Height: 1.80 m (5 ft 11 in)
- Position: Striker

Team information
- Current team: Copenhagen (on loan from Ajax)
- Number: 7

Youth career
- –2015: Central Córdoba
- 2015–2024: Vélez Sarsfield

Senior career*
Years	Team	Apps	(Gls)
2024–2026	Vélez Sarsfield	34	(5)
2026–	Ajax	4	(0)
2026–	Copenhagen (loan)	3	(1)

International career^{‡}
2023	Argentina U17	2	(0)
2024–	Argentina U20	18	(9)
Medal record
Men's association football
Representing Argentina
FIFA U-20 World Cup
Runner-up	2025 Chile
South American U-20 Championship
Runner-up	2025 Venezuela
- * Club domestic league appearances and goals as of 26 October 2026 ‡ National team caps and goals as of 20 October 2025

Maher Mauricio Carrizo (born 19 February 2006) is an Argentine professional footballer who plays as a striker for Danish Superliga club Copenhagen, on loan from Eredivisie club Ajax.

== Early life ==
Carrizo was born in Santiago del Estero. He began his footballing development at the age of five in a local football school in his hometown of Colonia Dora. He subsequently spent time in the youth system of Central Córdoba.

== Club career ==
=== Vélez Sarsfield ===
In 2015, Carrizo joined the youth academy of Vélez Sarsfield. He progressed through the youth ranks, notably finishing as the top scorer of the youth divisions in 2023 with 26 goals.

Carrizo made his unofficial debut for the first team on 17 January 2024 against Belgrano in the Serie Río de La Plata friendly tournament. He made his official professional debut later that year. On 6 August 2024, he scored his first professional goal during a Copa Argentina match. Carrizo was part of the squad that secured the 2024 Argentine Primera División title, Vélez's first league championship since 2013.

=== Ajax ===
On 3 February 2026, Ajax announced the signing of Carrizo on a four-and-a-half-year contract. He was assigned the number 7 shirt. He made his debut on 1 March 2026, coming on as a substitute against PEC Zwolle.

==== Loan to Copenhagen ====
On 31 August 2026, Carrizo joined Danish Superliga club Copenhagen on loan for the 2026–27 season.

== International career ==
In November 2023, Carrizo was called up to the Argentina U17 squad by manager Diego Placente for the 2023 FIFA U-17 World Cup.

He progressed to the Argentina U20 team in August 2024 under Javier Mascherano. In 2025, he represented Argentina at the 2025 South American U-20 Championship in Venezuela, where the team finished as runners-up. Later that year, he was a key member of the squad that reached the final of the 2025 FIFA U-20 World Cup in Chile.

== Career statistics ==
As of 29 October 2026

Club	Season	League			National cup (Note: Includes Copa Argentina, KNVB Cup)		Continental		Other		Total	
Club	Season	Division	Apps	Goals	Apps	Goals	Apps	Goals	Apps	Goals	Apps	Goals
Vélez Sarsfield	2024	Primera División	11	0	3	1	—		2 (Note: One Appearance in Supercopa Internacional, one appearance in Trofeo de Campeones de la Liga Profesional)	0	16	1
Vélez Sarsfield	2025	Primera División	22	5	2	0	10 (Note: Appearances in Copa Libertadores)	5	1 (Note: Appearance in Supercopa Argentina)	0	35	10
Vélez Sarsfield	2026	Primera División	1	0	—		—		—		1	0
Vélez Sarsfield	Total		34	5	5	1	10	5	3	0	52	11
Ajax	2025–26	Eredivisie	4	0	—		—		2 (Note: Appearances in European play-offs)	0	6	0
Ajax	2026–27	Eredivisie	0	0	—		2 (Note: Appearances in UEFA Conference League)	0	—		2	0
Ajax	Total		4	0	0	0	2	0	2	0	8	0
Copenhagen (loan)	2026–27	Danish Superliga	3	1	2	0	1	1	—		6	2
Career total			41	5	7	1	13	6	5	0	66	13

== Honours ==
Vélez Sarsfield

- Argentine Primera División: 2024
- Supercopa Internacional: 2024

Argentina U20

- FIFA U-20 World Cup runner-up: 2025
- South American U-20 Championship runner-up: 2025
