= Ignacio Vásquez (footballer) =

Chilean footballer

Personal information
- Full name: Ignacio Antonio Vásquez González
- Date of birth: 22 May 2006 (age 20)
- Place of birth: San Bernardo, Santiago, Chile
- Height: 1.72 m (5 ft 8 in)
- Position: Attacking midfielder

Team information
- Current team: Universidad de Chile
- Number: 23

Youth career
- Cobresal
- 2023–2024: Universidad de Chile

Senior career*
Years	Team	Apps	(Gls)
2024–	Universidad de Chile	22	(1)

International career^{‡}
2023	Chile U17	8	(0)
2024–2025	Chile U20	14	(1)
- * Club domestic league appearances and goals as of 9 April 2026 ‡ National team caps and goals as of 9 April 2026

Ignacio Antonio Vásquez González (born 22 May 2006) is a Chilean professional footballer who plays as an attacking midfielder for Universidad de Chile.

== Club career ==
Born in San Bernardo commune, Santiago de Chile, Vásquez was trained at Cobresal and joined Universidad de Chile in May 2023, signing his first professional contract. He made his senior debut in the home and away matches against San Antonio Unido for the 2024 Copa Chile. He was a starting player, scoring 2 goals, in the 7–0 home victory on 2 July 2024. On 20 November 2024, Vásquez helped Universidad de Chile in capturing its 6th Copa Chile title, in a 1–0 victory over Ñublense.

On 23 August 2024, Vásquez scored his first league goal for Universidad de Chile, in a 4–0 victory over Cobreloa.

== International career ==
Vásquez represented Chile at under-17 level in the 2023 South American Championship.

Later, Vásquez represented the under 20's in friendlies during 2024 and 2025 and the 2025 South American U20 Championship.
