= Guilmar Centella =

Bolivian association football player (born 2005)

Personal information
- Date of birth: 26 March 2005 (age 21)
- Place of birth: Santa Cruz, Bolivia
- Position: Forward

Team information
- Current team: Club Blooming

Senior career*
Years	Team	Apps	(Gls)
2023-	Club Blooming	65	(2)

International career^{‡}
2025	Bolivia U20	5	(0)
2026–	Bolivia	2	(0)
- * Club domestic league appearances and goals as of 00:15 (UTC) 27 May 2026 ‡ National team caps and goals as of 10 June 2026

Guilmar Centella (born 26 March 2005) is a Bolivian professional footballer who plays as a forward for Club Blooming and the Bolivia national football team.

== Club career ==
From Santa Cruz in Bolivia, Centella plays as an attacking midfielder, and sometimes as a striker, for Primera Division side Club Blooming.

== International career ==
Centella played for Bolivia under-20, and made his debut for the Bolivia national football team as a second-half substitute for Juan Godoy in a friendly match against Trinidad and Tobago on 15 March 2026, in a 3–0 win. Later that month, he continued with the national team for the 2026 FIFA World Cup qualification inter-confederation play-offs against Suriname.

== Career statistics ==
=== International ===
As of match played 10 June 2026

Appearances and goals by national team and year
National team	Year	Apps	Goals
Bolivia	2026	2	0
Total		2	0
