= Bassco Soyer =

Peruvian footballer (born 2006)

Personal information
- Full name: Bassco Soyer Cantella
- Date of birth: 17 October 2006 (age 20)
- Place of birth: Lima, Peru
- Height: 1.72 m (5 ft 8 in)
- Positions: Midfielder; winger

Team information
- Current team: Gil Vicente
- Number: 88

Youth career
- Alianza Lima
- 2025–: Gil Vicente

Senior career*
Years	Team	Apps	(Gls)
2023–2025	Alianza Lima	8	(1)
2025–	Gil Vicente	0	(0)

International career^{‡}
- Peru U17
2024–2025	Peru U20	13	(2)
2023–2024	Peru U23	3	(0)
2025–	Peru	4	(1)
- * Club domestic league appearances and goals ‡ National team caps and goals as of 14 November 2026

Bassco Soyer Cantella (born 17 October 2006) is a Peruvian professional footballer who plays as a midfielder or winger for Primeira Liga club Gil Vicente and the Peru national team.

== Club career ==
As a youth player, Soyer joined the youth academy of Peruvian side Alianza Lima at the age of nine and was promoted to the club's senior team in 2023, where he made eight league appearances and scored zero goals. Following his stint there, he signed for Portuguese side Gil Vicente ahead of the 2025–26 season.

== International career ==
Soyer is a Peru international. During January 2024, he played for the Peru national under-23 football team at the 2024 CONMEBOL Pre-Olympic Tournament.

== Style of play ==
Soyer plays as a midfielder or winger. Peruvian newspaper La República wrote in 2023 that he "is known for his excellent ball control and his ability to beat defenders in one-on-one situations".
