= Defensor Sporting =

Uruguayan sports club

- Full name: Defensor Sporting Club
- Nicknames: El Violeta; La Viola; El Tuerto; El Defe; La Farola; La Cometa
- Founded: 15 March 1913; 113 years ago
- Ground: Estadio Luis Franzini, Montevideo, Uruguay
- Capacity: 16,000
- Chairman: Diego Franzini
- Coach: Vacant
- League: Liga AUF Uruguaya
- 2025: Liga AUF Uruguaya, 5th of 16
- Website: www.defensorsporting.com.uy
Home colours	Away colours

Defensor Sporting Club is a sports club based in Montevideo, Uruguay. Founded in 1913, Defensor has several sports sections, with football and basketball being the most important and the ones in which the club has achieved significant achievements in Uruguay and internationally.

It is the third most highest winning club in Uruguay, with 24 official titles, only surpassed by Peñarol and Club Nacional de Football. The club's best performance at the international stage was in 2014, when they reached the semi-finals of the Copa Libertadores, eventually losing to Club Nacional 2–1 on aggregate. They have won the Uruguayan Championship four times: in 1976, 1987, 1991, and 2007-08. Their 1976 title win was especially notable in Uruguay's football history as it ended 44 years of dominance by Nacional and Peñarol.

== History ==
Founded on 15 March 1913, as Club Atlético Defensor, with heavyweight in soccer, the name of the club was changed in 1989 to Defensor Sporting Club after a merger with Sporting Club Uruguay, originally a basketball club. They played in the first professional league season in Uruguay, the 1932 Uruguayan Primera División.

Defensor has won several qualifying tournaments (Pre-Liguilla) to the Copa Libertadores and has represented Uruguay on numerous occasions internationally. Defensor regarded as one of the teams that created and developed many players in Uruguay that become successful players worldwide, like Jorge "Polilla" da Silva, Sergio "Manteca" Martínez, Sebastián Abreu, Andrés Fleurquin, Marcelo Tejera, Darío Silva, Gonzalo Vargas, Diego "Ruso" Pérez, Nicolás Olivera, Martín Cáceres, Maxi Pereira, Álvaro González, and Tabaré Viúdez.

Legendary coach Prof. José Ricardo de León brought Defensor to the national championship in 1976 and originated a football (fútbol) school of thought, consistently criticized as ultra defensive, that is still present nowadays in several teams and coaches.

In September 2007, the club was considered the World's Club Team of the Month by the IFFHS.

== Stadium ==
Defensor plays its home games at its own stadium called Estadio Luis Franzini which has a capacity for 18,000 spectators. The stadium was opened on 31 December 1963, and is located in Parque Rodó, Montevideo.

== Rivalries ==
Defensor Sporting has had a rivalry with Danubio in recent years, because of the two clubs being the next biggest clubs in Uruguay after the historical two: Peñarol and Nacional. Matches between them are called the "Clásico de los medianos" (Spanish for Classic of the Mediums).

== Honours ==
=== Senior titles ===
Keys

- Record
- ^{(s)} Shared record

Type	Competition	Titles	Winning years
National (League)	Primera División	4	1976, 1987, 1991, 2008
National (League)	Segunda División	2	1950, 1965
National (League)	Segunda División (1903-1914)	1	1914
National (League)	Divisional Tercera Extra	1	1913
Half-year / Short tournament (League)	Torneo Apertura	4	1994, 2007, 2010, 2017
Half-year / Short tournament (League)	Torneo Clausura	4	1997, 2009, 2012, 2013
National (Cups)	Copa AUF Uruguay	3	2022, 2023, 2024
National (Cups)	Liguilla Pre-Libertadores	8	1976, 1979, 1981, 1989, 1991, 1995, 2000, 2006
National (Cups)	Campeonato Nacional General Artigas	1	1960
National (Cups)	Torneo Cuadrangular	1	1957

== Performance in CONMEBOL competitions ==
- Copa Libertadores: 17 appearances

1977: Group Stage
1980: Group Stage
1982: Group Stage
1990: Round of 16
1992: Round of 16
1994: Round of 16
1996: Round of 16
2001: Group Stage
2006: First Round
2007: Quarter-finals
2009: Quarter-finals
2012: Group Stage
2013: First Stage
2014: Semi-finals
2018: Group Stage
2019: Third Qualifying Stage
2024: First Qualifying Stage

- U-20 Copa Libertadores: 1 appearance

2012: Runner-up

- Copa Sudamericana: 8 appearances

2005: Second Round
2007: Quarter-finals
2008: Round of 16
2010: Round of 16
2015: Quarter-finals
2017: First Stage
2018: Second Stage
2023: First Stage

- Copa CONMEBOL: 2 appearances

1995: First Round
1997: First Round

== Kit evolution ==
1913
1915–present
1922–25
1989 away
1960s–1980s & 1993
2001 away

== Current squad ==
As of 22 March, 2026

Note: Flags indicate national team as defined under FIFA eligibility rules; some limited exceptions apply. Players may hold more than one non-FIFA nationality.

No.	Pos.	Nation	Player
1	GK	URU	Lucas Machado
2	DF	URU	Daniel Martínez
3	DF	URU	Guillermo de los Santos
4	DF	URU	Geanfranco Rodríguez
5	MF	URU	Germán Barrios
6	MF	URU	Mauricio Amaro
7	FW	URU	Brian Lozano
8	MF	URU	Nicolás Wunsch
9	FW	URU	Alexander Machado
10	MF	MEX	Xavier Biscayzacú
11	FW	URU	Lucas Agazzi
12	GK	URU	Kevin Dawson
14	DF	URU	Francisco Sorondo

No.	Pos.	Nation	Player
15	DF	URU	Axel Frugone
17	DF	URU	Valentín Rodríguez
20	DF	URU	Mateo Caballero
22	FW	URU	Alan Torterolo
23	GK	URU	Bruno Simone
24	MF	URU	Lucas de los Santos
26	FW	PAR	Brian Montenegro
27	MF	URU	Juan Manuel Jorge
28	FW	URU	Lautaro Navarro
30	MF	URU	Erico Cuello
33	MF	URU	Santino Bruschi
61	DF	PER	Marco Saravia
77	FW	URU	Facundo Castro
97	FW	PER	Juan Pablo Goicochea (on loan from Platense)

=== Out on loan ===
Note: Flags indicate national team as defined under FIFA eligibility rules; some limited exceptions apply. Players may hold more than one non-FIFA nationality.

No.	Pos.	Nation	Player
—	DF	URU	Patricio Pacífico (at FC Barcelona 26 January 2026)

No.	Pos.	Nation	Player
—	DF	URU	Ariel Lima (at Cerro 30 June 2026)
—	FW	URU	Augusto Cambón (at Cerro 30 June 2026)

== Notable coaches ==
- (Uruguay) Hugo Bagnulo (1952–1957; 1960–1961)
- (Uruguay) Gregorio Pérez (1983–1984)
- (Uruguay) Juan Ahuntchaín (1996)
- (Uruguay) Ricardo Ortiz (1996–1997)
- (Uruguay) Juan Tejera (2004–2005)
- (Uruguay) Jorge da Silva (2005–2009)
- (Uruguay) Gustavo Ferrín (2009–2010)
- (Uruguay) Pablo Repetto (2010–2011)
- (Uruguay) Gustavo Díaz (2011–2012)
- (Uruguay) Tabaré Silva (2012–2013)
- (Uruguay) Fernando Curutchet (2013–2014)
- (Uruguay) Mauricio Larriera (2015–2016)
- (Uruguay) Eduardo Acevedo (2016–2018)
