= 2025 South American U-20 Championship =

CONMEBOL Sub 20 Venezuela 2025

Tournament details
- Host country: Venezuela
- Dates: 23 January – 16 February
- Teams: 10 (from 1 confederation)
- Venues: 5 (in 4 host cities)

Final positions
- Champions: Brazil (13th title)
- Runners-up: Argentina
- Third place: Colombia
- Fourth place: Paraguay

Tournament statistics
- Matches played: 35
- Goals scored: 103 (2.94 per match)
- Top scorer(s): (Colombia) Néiser Villarreal (8 goals)

The 2025 South American U-20 Championship was the 31st edition of the South American U-20 Championship (Spanish: CONMEBOL Sudamericano Sub-20, Portuguese: CONMEBOL Sul-Americano Sub-20), the biennial international youth football championship organised by CONMEBOL for the men's under-20 national teams of South America. It was held in Venezuela from 23 January to 16 February 2025.

Same as previous editions, the tournament acted as the CONMEBOL qualifiers for the FIFA U-20 World Cup. The top four teams qualified for the 2025 FIFA U-20 World Cup in Chile as the CONMEBOL representatives. Chile automatically qualified as host (if Chile were among the top four teams, the fifth-placed team would have also qualified).

== Host nation and venues ==
=== Original host ===
Peru was originally announced as host country for the tournament by the CONMEBOL President Alejandro Domínguez during a CONMEBOL Council meeting held on 10 April 2024, with Arequipa as host city. The Peruvian Football Federation had submitted to CONMEBOL in March 2024 the bid to organize this competition.

With three venues required as a minimum by CONMEBOL, four possible venues were initially considered: Estadio Monumental UNSA, Estadio Melgar, Estadio La Tomilla and Estadio Municipal de Sachaca, with the latter three needing considerable improvements to host the matches. In October 2024, it was announced that Lima would be added as host city due to the lack of suitable stadiums in Arequipa, with the first stage planned to be held in Lima and the final stage to take place in Arequipa.

On 13 November 2024, local Peruvian media announced that Peru had lost the hosting of the tournament, presumably due to institutional instability in the Peruvian Football Federation as a result of the arrest of its president Agustín Lozano a week earlier.

=== Venezuela, the new host ===
On 15 November 2024, CONMEBOL announced some changes to its competition calendar for 2025 in a letter sent to its member associations, confirming Venezuela as the new host of the South American U-20 Championship, replacing Peru. In this way, Venezuela had to relinquish the organization of the 2025 South American U-17 Championship for which it had previously been designated, leaving the task to Colombia.

Venezuelan Football Federation president Jorge Giménez announced that the potential host cities would be Barquisimeto, Valencia, Puerto La Cruz and Maturín. These host cities were confirmed by CONMEBOL when publishing the tournament's match schedule, with the exception of Maturín, which was replaced by Caracas.

Barquisimeto	Location of the host cities of the 2025 South American U-20 Championship.	
Estadio Metropolitano de Cabudare	Location of the host cities of the 2025 South American U-20 Championship.	
Capacity: 40,312	Location of the host cities of the 2025 South American U-20 Championship.	
Valencia	Location of the host cities of the 2025 South American U-20 Championship.	
Estadio Misael Delgado	Location of the host cities of the 2025 South American U-20 Championship.	
Capacity: 10,400	Location of the host cities of the 2025 South American U-20 Championship.	
Puerto La Cruz	Caracas	
Estadio José Antonio Anzoátegui	Estadio Brígido Iriarte	Estadio Olímpico de la UCV
Capacity: 37,485	Capacity: 10,000	Capacity: 24,264

== Teams ==
All ten CONMEBOL member national teams entered the tournament.

Team	Appearance	Previous best performance
Argentina	29th	Champions (5 times, most recent 2015)
Bolivia	26th	Fourth place (2 times, most recent 1983)
Brazil (holders)	30th	Champions (12 times, most recent 2023)
Chile	31st	Runners-up (1 time, 1975)
Colombia	29th	Champions (3 times, most recent 2013)
Ecuador	26th	Champions (1 time, 2019)
Paraguay	29th	Champions (1 time, 1971)
Peru	30th	Fourth place (5 times, most recent 1975)
Uruguay	30th	Champions (8 times, most recent 2017)
Venezuela (hosts)	27th	Third place (2 times, most recent 2017)

== Squads ==
Each team could register a maximum of 23 and a minimum of 19 players, including at least 3 goalkeepers. Players born between 1 January 2005 and 31 December 2009 (ages 16 to 20) were eligible to compete in the tournament (Regulations Articles 47 and 50).

== Draws ==
=== Original draw ===
The original draw of the tournament was held on 29 October 2024, 12:00 PYT (UTC−3), at the CONMEBOL headquarters in Luque, Paraguay. The ten involved teams will be drawn into two groups of five. The hosts Peru and defending champions Brazil were seeded into Group A and Group B respectively and assigned to position 1 in their group, while the remaining teams were placed into four "pairing pots" according to their final position in the 2023 South American U-20 Championship (shown in brackets).

Seeded	Pot 1	Pot 2	Pot 3	Pot 4
Peru (10) (Hosts, assigned to A1); Brazil (1) (Title holders, assigned to B1)	Uruguay (2); Colombia (3)	Ecuador (4); Venezuela (5)	Paraguay (6); Chile (7)	Argentina (8); Bolivia (9)

From each pot, the first team drawn was placed into Group A and the second team drawn was placed into Group B. In both groups, teams from pot 1 were allocated in position 2, teams from pot 2 in position 3, teams from pot 3 in position 4 and teams from pot 4 in position 5.

The original draw resulted in the following groups:

Group A
Pos	Team
A1	Peru
A2	Uruguay
A3	Venezuela
A4	Paraguay
A5	Argentina

Group B
Pos	Team
B1	Brazil
B2	Colombia
B3	Ecuador
B4	Chile
B5	Bolivia

=== Second draw ===
As a result of the change of the host country, CONMEBOL decided to hold a second draw on 6 December 2024 under the same procedures as the previous one, but with the seedings and pots updated.

Seeded	Pot 1	Pot 2	Pot 3	Pot 4
Venezuela (5) (Hosts, assigned to A1); Brazil (1) (Title holders, assigned to B1)	Uruguay (2); Colombia (3)	Ecuador (4); Paraguay (6)	Chile (7); Argentina (8)	Bolivia (9); Peru (10)

The second draw resulted in the following groups:

Group A
Pos	Team
A1	Venezuela
A2	Uruguay
A3	Paraguay
A4	Chile
A5	Peru

Group B
Pos	Team
B1	Brazil
B2	Colombia
B3	Ecuador
B4	Argentina
B5	Bolivia

== Match officials ==
On 10 December 2024, CONMEBOL announced a total of 11 referees and 22 assistant referees appointed for the tournament, including an Italian refereeing team from UEFA. This is the second time that a UEFA refereeing team will participate in the South American U-20 Championship because of the continuation of the UEFA–CONMEBOL memorandum of understanding signed in February 2020, which included a referee exchange programme since 2021.

- (Argentina) Maximiliano Ramírez
  - Assistants: Pablo González and Pablo Acevedo
- (Bolivia) Jordy Alemán
  - Assistants: Carlos Tapia and Rubén Flores
- (Brazil) Paulo Zanovelli
  - Assistants: Nailton Sousa and Luanderson de Lima
- (Chile) José Cabero
  - Assistants: Juan Serrano and Alejandro Molina
- (Colombia) Jhon Hinestroza
  - Assistants: Miguel Roldán and David Fuentes
- (Ecuador) Alex Cajas
  - Assistants: Edison Vásquez and Dennys Guerrero
- (Paraguay) Derlis López
  - Assistants: José Villagra and Luis Onieva
- (Peru) Michael Espinoza
  - Assistants: Stephen Atoche and Coty Carrera
- (Italy) Andrea Colombo
  - Assistants: Luigi Rossi and Marcello Rossi
- (Uruguay) Mathías De Armas
  - Assistants: Agustín Berisso and Horacio Ferreiro
- (Venezuela) Yender Herrera
  - Assistants: Antoni García and José Martínez

== First stage ==
The top three teams in each group advanced to the final stage.

Tiebreakers

In the first stage, teams were ranked according to points earned (3 points for a win, 1 point for a draw, 0 points for a loss). If tied on points, tiebreakers would be applied in the following order (Regulations Article 20):

1. Head-to-head result between tied teams;
  - Points in head-to-head matches among the tied teams;
  - Goal difference in head-to-head matches among the tied teams;
  - Goals scored in head-to-head matches among the tied teams;
2. Goal difference in all group matches;
3. Goals scored in all group matches;
4. Fewest red cards received;
5. Fewest yellow cards received;
6. Drawing of lots.

All match times are in VET (UTC−4), as listed by CONMEBOL.

=== Group A ===
Pos	Team	Pld	W	D	L	GF	GA	GD	Pts	Qualification
1	Uruguay	4	3	0	1	10	2	+8	9 (Note: Head-to-head result: Uruguay 6–0 Paraguay)	Final stage
2	Paraguay	4	3	0	1	5	8	−3	9	Final stage
3	Chile	4	2	0	2	7	7	0	6 (Note: Head-to-head result: Venezuela 1–2 Chile)	Final stage
4	Venezuela (H)	4	2	0	2	6	3	+3	6	
5	Peru	4	0	0	4	3	11	−8	0	

Source: CONMEBOL
Rules for classification: Tiebreakers
(H) Hosts
Notes:
23 January 2025
17:00

Peru	1–2	Paraguay
Goicochea 20'	Report	Kmet 26' (pen.); Fernández 72'

Estadio Metropolitano de Cabudare, Barquisimeto
Referee: Jhon Hinestroza (Colombia)
23 January 2025
19:30

Venezuela	1–2	Chile
Andrade 45+5'	Report	Rossel 34', 40'

Estadio Metropolitano de Cabudare, Barquisimeto
Referee: Maximiliano Ramírez (Argentina)

25 January 2025
17:00

Chile	1–2	Uruguay
Ramos 16'	Report	Machado 8'; Rossel 90+6' (o.g.)

Estadio Metropolitano de Cabudare, Barquisimeto
Referee: Paulo Zanovelli (Brazil)
25 January 2025
19:30

Peru	0–4	Venezuela
	Report	Tamayo 13'; Arias 66' (o.g.); Rodríguez 81'; Vegas 89'

Estadio Metropolitano de Cabudare, Barquisimeto
Referee: Andrea Colombo (Italy)

27 January 2025
17:00

Chile	3–2	Peru
Vásquez 12'; Rossel 86', 90+3'	Report	Soyer 24'; Goicochea 53'

Estadio Metropolitano de Cabudare, Barquisimeto
Referee: Jordy Alemán (Bolivia)
27 January 2025
19:30

Uruguay	6–0	Paraguay
Severo 14'; Petit 26', 31'; Machado 62'; Crucci 67'; Barbas 75'	Report

Estadio Metropolitano de Cabudare, Barquisimeto
Referee: Maximiliano Ramírez (Argentina)

29 January 2025
17:00

Uruguay	2–0	Peru
Machado 6'; Pacífico 13'	Report

Estadio Metropolitano de Cabudare, Barquisimeto
Referee: Alex Cajas (Ecuador)
29 January 2025
19:30

Paraguay	1–0	Venezuela
Alfonso 42'	Report

Estadio Metropolitano de Cabudare, Barquisimeto
Referee: Jhon Hinestroza (Colombia)

31 January 2025
19:30

Venezuela	1–0	Uruguay
Andrade 59' (pen.)	Report

Estadio Metropolitano de Cabudare, Barquisimeto
Referee: Paulo Zanovelli (Brazil)
31 January 2025
19:30

Paraguay	2–1	Chile
Paoli 35'; Á. Aguayo 57'	Report	Ramos 69'

Estadio Misael Delgado, Valencia
Referee: Andrea Colombo (Italy)

=== Group B ===
Pos	Team	Pld	W	D	L	GF	GA	GD	Pts	Qualification
1	Colombia	4	3	1	0	6	3	+3	10	Final stage
2	Argentina	4	2	2	0	8	1	+7	8	Final stage
3	Brazil	4	2	0	2	5	10	−5	6	Final stage
4	Ecuador	4	1	1	2	4	5	−1	4	
5	Bolivia	4	0	0	4	4	8	−4	0	

Source: CONMEBOL
Rules for classification: Tiebreakers
24 January 2025
17:00

Bolivia	1–2	Ecuador
Rojas 25'	Report	Arroyo 51'; Obando 54'

Estadio Misael Delgado, Valencia
Referee: Yender Herrera (Venezuela)
24 January 2025
19:30

Brazil	0–6	Argentina
	Report	Subiabre 6'; Echeverri 8', 54'; Igor Serrote 11' (o.g.); Ruberto 52'; Hidalgo 78'

Estadio Misael Delgado, Valencia
Referee: Derlis López (Paraguay)

26 January 2025
17:00

Bolivia	1–2	Brazil
Centella 47'	Report	Gabriel Moscardo 14'; Breno Bidon 28'

Estadio Misael Delgado, Valencia
Referee: Michael Espinoza (Peru)
26 January 2025
19:30

Argentina	1–1	Colombia
Echeverri 36'	Report	Perea 33'

Estadio Misael Delgado, Valencia
Referee: José Cabero (Chile)

28 January 2025
17:00

Argentina	1–0	Bolivia
Rodríguez 86'	Report

Estadio Misael Delgado, Valencia
Referee: Yender Herrera (Venezuela)
28 January 2025
19:30

Colombia	1–0	Ecuador
N. Villarreal 41'	Report

Estadio Misael Delgado, Valencia
Referee: Mathías De Armas (Uruguay)

30 January 2025
17:00

Colombia	3–2	Bolivia
N. Villarreal 2'; González 14'; Montaño 86'	Report	Rojas 60'; Rodríguez 90+4'

Estadio Misael Delgado, Valencia
Referee: Derlis López (Paraguay)
30 January 2025
19:30

Ecuador	2–3	Brazil
Obando 76'; Páez 84' (pen.)	Report	Iago 25'; Deivid Washington 27', 45+1'

Estadio Misael Delgado, Valencia
Referee: José Cabero (Chile)

1 February 2025
17:00

Brazil	0–1	Colombia
	Report	N. Villarreal 47'

Estadio Misael Delgado, Valencia
Referee: Mathías De Armas (Uruguay)
1 February 2025
17:00

Ecuador	0–0	Argentina
	Report

Estadio Metropolitano de Cabudare, Barquisimeto
Referee: Michael Espinoza (Peru)

== Final stage ==
The ranking of teams in the final stage was determined using the same criteria as the first stage, taking into account only matches in the final stage, with the exception of red and yellow card counts which carry over from the first stage (Regulations Article 21).

Since the final matchday were not scheduled to be played simultaneously (Regulations Article 18), the order of the matches of the teams that still had a chance to win the title (Brazil and Argentina) was determined by drawing lots, with the Brazil vs Chile taking place before the Argentina vs Paraguay.

All match times are in VET (UTC−4), as listed by CONMEBOL.

Pos	Team	Pld	W	D	L	GF	GA	GD	Pts	Qualification
1	Brazil (C)	5	4	1	0	9	2	+7	13	2025 U-20 World Cup
2	Argentina	5	3	1	1	10	8	+2	10	2025 U-20 World Cup
3	Colombia	5	3	0	2	10	4	+6	9 (Note: Head-to-head result: Colombia 4–0 Paraguay.)	2025 U-20 World Cup
4	Paraguay	5	3	0	2	7	10	−3	9	2025 U-20 World Cup
5	Uruguay	5	0	1	4	5	10	−5	1	
6	Chile	5	0	1	4	4	11	−7	1	2025 U-20 World Cup (Note: Chile qualified for the 2025 FIFA U-20 World Cup as hosts.)

Source: CONMEBOL
Rules for classification: Tiebreakers
(C) Champions
Notes:
4 February 2025
16:00

Chile	1–2	Argentina
Rossel 61'	Report	Subiabre 35'; Ruberto 42'

Estadio Olímpico de la UCV, Caracas
Referee: Paulo Zanovelli (Brazil)
4 February 2025
18:30

Uruguay	0–1	Brazil
	Report	Pedro 74'

Estadio Brígido Iriarte, Caracas
Referee: Andrea Colombo (Italy)
4 February 2025
21:00

Colombia	4–0	Paraguay
Barrera 14'; N. Villarreal 31', 51', 71'	Report

Estadio Brígido Iriarte, Caracas
Referee: Maximiliano Ramírez (Argentina)

7 February 2025
16:00

Colombia	0–1	Brazil
	Report	Iago 6'

Estadio Olímpico de la UCV, Caracas
Referee: José Cabero (Chile)
7 February 2025
18:30

Uruguay	3–4	Argentina
Lavega 60', 75'; Crucci 86'	Report	Echeverri 38', 45+3'; Carrizo 52', 69'

Estadio Brígido Iriarte, Caracas
Referee: Michael Espinoza (Peru)
7 February 2025
21:00

Paraguay	2–1	Chile
Alfonso 55'; Kmet 90+3'	Report	Arce 83'

Estadio Brígido Iriarte, Caracas
Referee: Alex Cajas (Ecuador)

10 February 2025
16:00

Paraguay	1–3	Brazil
Á. Aguayo 25'	Report	Prado 15'; Rayan 17'; Santana 78'

Estadio Olímpico de la UCV, Caracas
Referee: Yender Herrera (Venezuela)
10 February 2025
18:30

Argentina	1–0	Colombia
Subiabre 86'	Report

Estadio Brígido Iriarte, Caracas
Referee: Andrea Colombo (Italy)
10 February 2025
21:00

Chile	1–1	Uruguay
Román 65'	Report	Rodríguez 45'

Estadio Brígido Iriarte, Caracas
Referee: Maximiliano Ramírez (Argentina)

13 February 2025
16:00

Paraguay	1–0	Uruguay
Paoli 52'	Report

Estadio Olímpico de la UCV, Caracas
Referee: José Cabero (Chile)
13 February 2025
18:30

Colombia	3–1	Chile
Perea 30'; N. Villarreal 50'; Benítez 81'	Report	Romero 38'

Estadio Brígido Iriarte, Caracas
Referee: Alex Cajas (Ecuador)
13 February 2025
21:00

Brazil	1–1	Argentina
Rayan 78'	Report	Echeverri 40' (pen.)

Estadio Brígido Iriarte, Caracas
Referee: Mathías De Armas (Uruguay)

16 February 2025
15:00

Uruguay	1–3	Colombia
Severo 13'	Report	N. Villarreal 6'; González 15'; Sarabia 39'

Estadio José Antonio Anzoátegui, Puerto La Cruz
Referee: Paulo Zanovelli (Brazil)
16 February 2025
17:30

Brazil	3–0	Chile
Deivid Washington 73'; Pedro 86'; Ricardo Mathias 88'	Report

Estadio José Antonio Anzoátegui, Puerto La Cruz
Referee: Yender Herrera (Venezuela)
16 February 2025
20:30

Argentina	2–3	Paraguay
Carrizo 52', 66'	Report	Kmet 30'; Caballero 47'; León 82'

Estadio José Antonio Anzoátegui, Puerto La Cruz
Referee: Andrea Colombo (Italy)

== Goalscorers ==
There were 103 goals scored in 35 matches, for an average of 2.94 goals per match.

8 goals

- (Colombia) Néiser Villarreal

6 goals

- (Argentina) Claudio Echeverri

5 goals

- (Chile) Juan Francisco Rossel

4 goals

- (Argentina) Maher Carrizo

3 goals

- (Argentina) Ian Subiabre
- (Brazil) Deivid Washington
- (Paraguay) Luca Kmet
- (Uruguay) Renzo Machado

2 goals

- (Argentina) Agustín Ruberto
- (Bolivia) Jairo Rojas
- (Brazil) Iago
- (Brazil) Pedro
- (Brazil) Rayan
- (Chile) Emiliano Ramos
- (Colombia) Kener González
- (Colombia) Óscar Perea
- (Ecuador) Allen Obando
- (Paraguay) Ángel Aguayo
- (Paraguay) Octavio Alfonso
- (Paraguay) Gadiel Paoli
- (Peru) Juan Pablo Goicochea
- (Uruguay) Esteban Crucci
- (Uruguay) Joaquín Lavega
- (Uruguay) Gonzalo Petit
- (Uruguay) Alejandro Severo
- (Venezuela) Kervin Andrade

1 goal

- (Argentina) Santiago Hidalgo
- (Argentina) Teo Rodríguez Pagano
- (Bolivia) Guilmar Centella
- (Bolivia) Patrick Rodríguez
- (Brazil) Breno Bidon
- (Brazil) Gabriel Moscardo
- (Brazil) Gustavo Prado
- (Brazil) Ricardo Mathias
- (Brazil) Alisson Santana
- (Chile) Agustín Arce
- (Chile) Iván Román
- (Chile) Patricio Romero
- (Chile) Ignacio Vásquez
- (Colombia) Jordan Barrera
- (Colombia) Royner Benítez
- (Colombia) John Montaño
- (Colombia) Carlos Sarabia
- (Ecuador) Keny Arroyo
- (Ecuador) Kendry Páez
- (Paraguay) Tiago Caballero
- (Paraguay) David Fernández
- (Paraguay) Diego León
- (Peru) Bassco Soyer
- (Uruguay) Germán Barbas
- (Uruguay) Patricio Pacífico
- (Uruguay) Juan Rodríguez
- (Venezuela) Leandro Rodríguez
- (Venezuela) Bianneider Tamayo
- (Venezuela) Miguel Vegas

1 own goal

- (Brazil) Igor Serrote (against Argentina)
- (Chile) Juan Francisco Rossel (against Uruguay)
- (Peru) Brian Arias (against Venezuela)

== Qualified teams for FIFA U-20 World Cup ==
The following five teams from CONMEBOL qualified for the 2025 FIFA U-20 World Cup, including Chile which qualified as hosts.

Team	Qualified on	Previous appearances in FIFA U-20 World Cup^{1}
Chile	17 December 2023	6 (1987, 1995, 2001, 2005, 2007, 2013)
Brazil	10 February 2025	19 (1977, 1981, **1983**, **1985**, 1987, 1989, 1991, **1993**, 1995, 1997, 1999, 2001, **2003**, 2005, 2007, 2009, **2011**, 2015, 2023)
Argentina	10 February 2025	17 (**1979**, 1981, 1983, 1989, 1991, **1995**, **1997**, 1999, **2001**, 2003, **2005**, **2007**, 2011, 2015, 2017, 2019, 2023)
Paraguay	13 February 2025	9 (1977, 1979, 1985, 1997, 1999, 2001, 2003, 2009, 2013)
Colombia	13 February 2025	11 (1985, 1987, 1989, 1993, 2003, 2005, 2011, 2013, 2015, 2019, 2023)

^{1} Bold indicates champions for that year. Italic indicates hosts for that year.
