= 2023 South American U-17 Championship squads =

The 2023 South American U-17 Championship was an international football tournament held in Ecuador from 30 March to 23 April 2023. The ten national teams involved in the tournament were required to register a squad of a minimum of 19 and a maximum of 23 players, including at least three goalkeepers (Regulations Article 49). Only players in these squads were eligible to take part in the tournament. The tournament exclusively required players to be born between 1 January 2006 and 31 December 2008 to be eligible, that is, they could be a maximum of 17 years old and at least 15 years old (Regulations Article 46).

Each national team had to register its list of up to 23 players in the COMET system and then submit it to CONMEBOL by 9 March 2023, 18:00 PYST (UTC−3) (Regulations Articles 49 and 50). Teams were only permitted to make player replacements in cases of serious injuries up to 48 hours before the start of the tournament (Regulations Article 57). Teams were also permitted to replace an injured goalkeeper with another at any time during the tournament (Regulations Article 58). In addition, any player with positive PCR tests for SARS-CoV-2 could be replaced at any moment before and during the tournament (Regulations Article 60). All the substitutions had to have the approval of the CONMEBOL Medical Commission.

The age listed for each player is as of 30 March 2023, the first day of the tournament. A flag is included for coaches who are of a different nationality than their own national team.

== Group A ==
=== Ecuador ===
Ecuador announced their squad of 23 players on 15 March 2023.

Head coach: Diego Martínez

No.	Pos.	Player	Date of birth (age)	Club
1	GK	Cristhian Loor	9 March 2006 (aged 17)	(Ecuadorian Football Federation) Independiente del Valle
3	DF	Ivis Davis	28 January 2007 (aged 16)	(Ecuadorian Football Federation) LDU Quito
2	DF	Jair Collahuazo	21 January 2006 (aged 17)	(Ecuadorian Football Federation) Emelec
4	DF	Jesús Polo	1 January 2007 (aged 16)	(Ecuadorian Football Federation) LDU Quito
5	MF	Jairo Reyes	7 January 2006 (aged 17)	(Ecuadorian Football Federation) Independiente del Valle
6	DF	Elkin Ruiz	27 May 2006 (aged 16)	(Ecuadorian Football Federation) Independiente del Valle
7	MF	Keny Arroyo	14 February 2006 (aged 17)	(Ecuadorian Football Federation) Independiente del Valle
8	MF	Geremy de Jesús	16 September 2006 (aged 16)	(Ecuadorian Football Federation) Independiente del Valle
9	FW	Michael Bermúdez	13 January 2006 (aged 17)	(Ecuadorian Football Federation) LDU Quito
10	MF	Kendry Páez	4 May 2007 (aged 15)	(Ecuadorian Football Federation) Independiente del Valle
11	FW	Allen Obando	13 June 2006 (aged 16)	(Ecuadorian Football Federation) Barcelona
12	GK	Ariel Bao	10 July 2006 (aged 16)	(Ecuadorian Football Federation) LDU Quito
13	MF	Rooney Troya	20 February 2006 (aged 17)	(Ecuadorian Football Federation) Universidad Católica
14	FW	Isaac Sánchez (captain)	8 June 2006 (aged 16)	(Ecuadorian Football Federation) Universidad Católica
15	MF	Juan Rodríguez	27 March 2006 (aged 17)	(Ecuadorian Football Federation) LDU Quito
16	MF	Aimar Govea	8 June 2006 (aged 16)	(Football Association of Wales) Swansea City
17	DF	Jalisthon Angulo	6 August 2007 (aged 15)	(Ecuadorian Football Federation) Independiente del Valle
18	DF	Jakson Plaza	27 May 2006 (aged 16)	(Ecuadorian Football Federation) Independiente del Valle
19	DF	Yermán Quiñonez	29 April 2006 (aged 16)	(Ecuadorian Football Federation) LDU Quito
20	FW	Jhon Acurio	18 January 2007 (aged 16)	(Ecuadorian Football Federation) Barcelona
21	FW	Santiago Sánchez	30 August 2006 (aged 16)	(Ecuadorian Football Federation) Independiente del Valle
22	GK	Josué Méndez	12 January 2006 (aged 17)	(Ecuadorian Football Federation) Deportivo Cuenca
23	DF	Steven Heras	29 January 2007 (aged 16)	(Ecuadorian Football Federation) Independiente del Valle

=== Chile ===
Chile announced their squad of 23 players on 16 March 2023.

Head coach: (Argentina) Hernán Caputto

No.	Pos.	Player	Date of birth (age)	Club
1	GK	Fernando Soto	31 July 2006 (aged 16)	(Football Federation of Chile) Unión Española
2	DF	Víctor Campos	26 January 2006 (aged 17)	(Football Federation of Chile) Colo-Colo
3	DF	Iván Román	12 July 2006 (aged 16)	(Football Federation of Chile) Palestino
4	DF	Lucas Velásquez	2 February 2006 (aged 17)	(Football Federation of Chile) Huachipato
5	DF	Benjamín Molina	6 January 2006 (aged 17)	(Football Federation of Chile) O'Higgins
6	MF	Milovan Celis	8 June 2006 (aged 16)	(Football Federation of Chile) Unión Española
7	FW	Bastián Escobar	18 February 2006 (aged 17)	(Football Federation of Chile) Deportes Temuco
8	MF	Benjamín Ampuero	5 March 2006 (aged 17)	(Football Federation of Chile) Huachipato
9	FW	Axel Cerda	13 April 2006 (aged 16)	(Football Federation of Chile) Universidad Católica
10	MF	Ignacio Vásquez	22 May 2006 (aged 16)	(Football Federation of Chile) Cobresal
11	FW	Alejandro Hales	28 March 2006 (aged 17)	(Football Federation of Chile) Palestino
12	GK	Christian Bravo	19 July 2006 (aged 16)	(Football Federation of Chile) Huachipato
13	DF	Cristián Morales	2 November 2006 (aged 16)	(Football Federation of Chile) O'Higgins
14	MF	Felipe Valdivia	10 January 2006 (aged 17)	(Football Federation of Chile) Colo-Colo
15	DF	Ignacio Pérez	6 June 2006 (aged 16)	(Football Federation of Chile) Universidad Católica
16	DF	Felipe Faúndez	27 March 2006 (aged 17)	(Football Federation of Chile) O'Higgins
17	MF	Francisco Marchant	31 July 2006 (aged 16)	(Football Federation of Chile) Colo-Colo
18	MF	Oliver Ramis	16 July 2006 (aged 16)	(Football Federation of Chile) Cobresal
19	FW	Benjamín Riquelme	3 January 2006 (aged 17)	(Football Federation of Chile) Palestino
20	FW	Benjamín Castro	10 March 2006 (aged 17)	(Football Federation of Chile) Colo-Colo
21	FW	Diego Opazo	13 June 2006 (aged 16)	(Football Federation of Chile) Santiago Wanderers
22	DF	Diego Vargas	31 August 2006 (aged 16)	(Football Federation of Chile) Universidad de Chile
23	GK	Francisco Valdés	5 March 2006 (aged 17)	(Football Federation of Chile) Universidad Católica

=== Uruguay ===
Uruguay announced their squad of 23 players on 8 March 2023.

Head coach: Diego Demarco

No.	Pos.	Player	Date of birth (age)	Club
1	GK	Martín Almeida	28 March 2006 (aged 17)	(Uruguayan Football Association) Peñarol
2	DF	Patricio Pacífico	8 April 2006 (aged 16)	(Uruguayan Football Association) Defensor Sporting
3	DF	Paolo Calione (captain)	22 May 2006 (aged 16)	(Uruguayan Football Association) Nacional
4	DF	Ignacio Alegre	7 June 2006 (aged 16)	(Uruguayan Football Association) Peñarol
5	MF	Thiago Helguera	26 March 2006 (aged 17)	(Uruguayan Football Association) Nacional
6	DF	Juan Echeverría	14 May 2006 (aged 16)	(Uruguayan Football Association) Nacional
7	FW	Facundo Techera	5 April 2006 (aged 16)	(Uruguayan Football Association) Defensor Sporting
8	MF	Felipe Serrés	14 February 2006 (aged 17)	(Uruguayan Football Association) Montevideo Wanderers
9	FW	Luciano González	1 January 2006 (aged 17)	(Uruguayan Football Association) Peñarol
10	MF	Mateo Peralta	8 April 2006 (aged 16)	(Uruguayan Football Association) Danubio
11	FW	Rodrigo Dudok	23 July 2007 (aged 15)	(Uruguayan Football Association) Defensor Sporting
12	GK	Juan Ignacio Blanco	22 March 2006 (aged 17)	(Uruguayan Football Association) Defensor Sporting
13	DF	Lautaro Dufur	17 October 2006 (aged 16)	(Uruguayan Football Association) Rentistas
14	MF	Máximo Cabral	22 January 2006 (aged 17)	(Uruguayan Football Association) Rocha
15	MF	Mateo Ureta	24 January 2006 (aged 17)	(Uruguayan Football Association) Peñarol
16	DF	Alfonso Montero	23 February 2007 (aged 16)	(Italian Football Federation) Juventus
17	FW	Stiven Muhlethaler	30 January 2006 (aged 17)	(Uruguayan Football Association) Peñarol
18	MF	Francisco Triver	18 April 2006 (aged 16)	(Uruguayan Football Association) River Plate
19	FW	Faustino Barone	11 May 2006 (aged 16)	(Uruguayan Football Association) River Plate
20	MF	Carlos Da Rosa	4 September 2006 (aged 16)	(Uruguayan Football Association) Atenas
21	MF	Emiliano Del Pino	28 April 2006 (aged 16)	(Uruguayan Football Association) Nacional
22	FW	Gonzalo Petit	21 September 2006 (aged 16)	(Uruguayan Football Association) Nacional
23	GK	Maximiliano Gómez	1 July 2006 (aged 16)	(Uruguayan Football Association) Liverpool

=== Brazil ===
Brazil announced their squad of 23 players on 8 March 2023. On 20 March 2023, defender Esquerdinha was ruled out due to an injury and was replaced by Isac.

Head coach: Phelipe Leal

No.	Pos.	Player	Date of birth (age)	Club
1	GK	Phillipe Gabriel	23 February 2006 (aged 17)	(Brazilian Football Confederation) Vasco da Gama
2	DF	Vitor Gabriel	11 March 2006 (aged 17)	(Brazilian Football Confederation) Atlético Mineiro
3	DF	Vitor Reis (captain)	12 January 2006 (aged 17)	(Brazilian Football Confederation) Palmeiras
4	DF	Da Mata	13 March 2006 (aged 17)	(Brazilian Football Confederation) Grêmio
5	MF	Matheus Ferreira	22 February 2006 (aged 17)	(Brazilian Football Confederation) Vasco da Gama
6	DF	Isac	2 April 2006 (aged 16)	(Brazilian Football Confederation) Red Bull Bragantino
7	FW	Rayan	3 August 2006 (aged 16)	(Brazilian Football Confederation) Vasco da Gama
8	MF	Lucas Camilo	25 May 2006 (aged 16)	(Brazilian Football Confederation) Grêmio
9	FW	Kauã Elias	28 March 2006 (aged 17)	(Brazilian Football Confederation) Fluminense
10	MF	Dudu	1 January 2006 (aged 17)	(Brazilian Football Confederation) Athletico Paranaense
11	FW	Lorran	4 July 2006 (aged 16)	(Brazilian Football Confederation) Flamengo
12	GK	César	7 January 2006 (aged 17)	(Brazilian Football Confederation) Palmeiras
13	DF	JP Chermont	18 January 2006 (aged 17)	(Brazilian Football Confederation) Santos
14	DF	João Dalla Corte	7 June 2006 (aged 16)	(Brazilian Football Confederation) Internacional
15	MF	Bernardo Valim	30 January 2006 (aged 17)	(Brazilian Football Confederation) Botafogo
16	DF	Souza	16 June 2006 (aged 16)	(Brazilian Football Confederation) Santos
17	FW	Riquelme Fillipi	15 September 2006 (aged 16)	(Brazilian Football Confederation) Palmeiras
18	MF	Luiz Gustavo	2 February 2006 (aged 17)	(Brazilian Football Confederation) Corinthians
19	FW	Ricardo Mathias	25 July 2006 (aged 16)	(Brazilian Football Confederation) Internacional
20	MF	Rhuan Gabriel	6 February 2006 (aged 17)	(Brazilian Football Confederation) Cruzeiro
21	FW	Matheus Reis	2 April 2007 (aged 15)	(Brazilian Football Confederation) Fluminense
22	GK	Caio Barone	4 May 2006 (aged 16)	(Brazilian Football Confederation) Flamengo
23	DF	Dayvisson	4 January 2006 (aged 17)	(Brazilian Football Confederation) Athletico Paranaense

=== Colombia ===
Colombia announced their squad of 23 players on 16 March 2023. On 24 March 2023, goalkeeper Andrés Tovar and defender Tomás Hoyos were replaced by Danny Castro and Marlon Balanta due to injuries.

Head coach: Juan Carlos Ramírez

No.	Pos.	Player	Date of birth (age)	Club
1	GK	Danny Castro	7 March 2006 (aged 17)	(Colombian Football Federation) Junior
2	DF	Elver Arizala	10 December 2006 (aged 16)	(Colombian Football Federation) Deportivo Cali
3	DF	Carlos González	12 January 2006 (aged 17)	(Colombian Football Federation) Atlético Nacional
4	DF	Marlon Balanta	21 April 2006 (aged 16)	(Colombian Football Federation) Real Cartagena
5	DF	Nicola Profeta (captain)	27 February 2006 (aged 17)	(Colombian Football Federation) Deportivo Cali
6	FW	Xavi Ríos	29 January 2006 (aged 17)	(Colombian Football Federation) Atlético Nacional
7	MF	Luis Tafur	18 November 2006 (aged 16)	(Colombian Football Federation) Real Cartagena
8	MF	Juan Obando	9 December 2006 (aged 16)	(Colombian Football Federation) Atlético Nacional
9	FW	Esteban Sánchez	24 February 2006 (aged 17)	(Colombian Football Federation) Tiendas Margos
10	MF	Jordan Barrera	11 April 2006 (aged 16)	(Colombian Football Federation) Barranquilla
11	FW	Juan Palacios	1 March 2006 (aged 17)	(Colombian Football Federation) Rojo
12	GK	Juan Gómez	7 May 2006 (aged 16)	(Colombian Football Federation) Atlético Nacional
13	MF	Jean Pierre Foronda	28 January 2006 (aged 17)	(Colombian Football Federation) Rojo
14	FW	Duvan Batioja	31 January 2006 (aged 17)	(Colombian Football Federation) Atlético Nacional
15	DF	Yuleiver Mosquera	25 February 2006 (aged 17)	(Colombian Football Federation) Rojo
16	FW	William López	19 September 2006 (aged 16)	(Colombian Football Federation) Estudiantil
17	MF	Jhoan Hernández	20 February 2006 (aged 17)	(Colombian Football Federation) Millonarios
18	MF	Jhon Echavez	5 January 2006 (aged 17)	(Colombian Football Federation) Área Chica
19	FW	Juan David Bonilla	18 January 2006 (aged 17)	(Colombian Football Federation) Envigado
20	FW	Brayan Caicedo	14 August 2006 (aged 16)	(Colombian Football Federation) Cyclones Cali
21	DF	Juan Asprilla	31 May 2006 (aged 16)	(Colombian Football Federation) Estudiantil
22	GK	Breiner Quintana	27 March 2006 (aged 17)	(Colombian Football Federation) Millonarios
23	FW	John Montaño	4 October 2006 (aged 16)	(Colombian Football Federation) Independiente Medellín

== Group B ==
=== Argentina ===
Argentina announced their squad of 23 players on 20 March 2023.

Head coach: Diego Placente

No.	Pos.	Player	Date of birth (age)	Club
1	GK	Froilán Díaz	1 June 2006 (aged 16)	(Argentine Football Association) Unión
2	DF	Ulises Giménez	1 January 2006 (aged 17)	(Argentine Football Association) River Plate
3	DF	Axel Cabellos	18 November 2006 (aged 16)	(Argentine Football Association) Racing
4	DF	Dylan Gorosito	3 February 2006 (aged 17)	(Argentine Football Association) Boca Juniors
5	MF	Camilo Rey Domenech	10 March 2006 (aged 17)	(Argentine Football Association) Boca Juniors
6	DF	Juan Villalba	15 March 2006 (aged 17)	(Argentine Football Association) Vélez Sarsfield
7	FW	Ian Subiabre	1 January 2007 (aged 16)	(Argentine Football Association) River Plate
8	MF	Gustavo Albarracín	28 April 2006 (aged 16)	(Argentine Football Association) Talleres
9	FW	Agustín Ruberto	14 January 2006 (aged 17)	(Argentine Football Association) River Plate
10	MF	Claudio Echeverri	2 January 2006 (aged 17)	(Argentine Football Association) River Plate
11	FW	Santiago López	9 February 2006 (aged 17)	(Argentine Football Association) Independiente
12	GK	Enrique Maza	28 February 2007 (aged 16)	(Argentine Football Association) Atlético Tucumán
13	DF	Octavio Ontivero	10 January 2006 (aged 17)	(Argentine Football Association) Lanús
14	DF	Tobías Ramírez	11 November 2006 (aged 16)	(Argentine Football Association) Argentinos Juniors
15	DF	Juan Giménez	27 April 2006 (aged 16)	(Argentine Football Association) Rosario Central
16	DF	Gonzalo Escudero	1 April 2007 (aged 15)	(Argentine Football Association) Racing
17	FW	Benjamín Acosta	8 February 2006 (aged 17)	(Argentine Football Association) Lanús
18	FW	Alejo Sarco	6 January 2006 (aged 17)	(Argentine Football Association) Vélez Sarsfield
19	MF	Kevin Gutiérrez	30 January 2006 (aged 17)	(Argentine Football Association) Rosario Central
20	MF	Mariano Gerez	19 January 2006 (aged 17)	(Argentine Football Association) Lanús
21	MF	Valentino Acuña	27 January 2006 (aged 17)	(Argentine Football Association) Newell's Old Boys
22	MF	Maximiliano Porcel	2 January 2006 (aged 17)	(Argentine Football Association) Vélez Sarsfield
23	GK	Lorenzo Luchino	20 March 2006 (aged 17)	(Royal Spanish Football Federation) Sevilla

=== Paraguay ===
Paraguay announced their squad of 23 players on 14 March 2023. On 26 March 2023, defender Alexander Zorrila was removed from the squad due to an injury and was replaced by Alex Sosa.

Head coach: Aldo Bobadilla

No.	Pos.	Player	Date of birth (age)	Club
1	GK	Facundo Insfrán	4 May 2006 (aged 16)	(Paraguayan Football Association) Olimpia
2	DF	Rodrigo Gómez	9 May 2006 (aged 16)	(Paraguayan Football Association) Cerro Porteño
3	DF	Fernando Galeano	20 August 2006 (aged 16)	(Paraguayan Football Association) Olimpia
4	DF	Rolando Mongelós	28 September 2006 (aged 16)	(Paraguayan Football Association) Cerro Porteño
5	DF	Óscar López	28 January 2006 (aged 17)	(Paraguayan Football Association) Cerro Porteño
6	MF	Ángel Aguayo	30 May 2006 (aged 16)	(Paraguayan Football Association) Sol de América
7	MF	Rodrigo Villalba	2 March 2006 (aged 17)	(Paraguayan Football Association) Libertad
8	MF	Fabricio Baruja	12 August 2006 (aged 16)	(Paraguayan Football Association) Olimpia
9	FW	David Fernández	5 January 2006 (aged 17)	(Paraguayan Football Association) Sol de América
10	MF	Paulo Riveros	24 February 2006 (aged 17)	(Paraguayan Football Association) Olimpia
11	FW	Jorge Mora	26 July 2006 (aged 16)	(Paraguayan Football Association) Sol de América
12	GK	Jesús Peralta	25 February 2006 (aged 17)	(Paraguayan Football Association) Olimpia
13	DF	Alex Sosa	12 January 2006 (aged 17)	(Paraguayan Football Association) Guaraní
14	DF	Emiliano Acosta	30 January 2006 (aged 17)	(Paraguayan Football Association) Cerro Porteño
15	MF	Éver Coronel	6 February 2006 (aged 17)	(Paraguayan Football Association) Guaraní
16	DF	Lucas Guiñazú	25 August 2006 (aged 16)	(Argentine Football Association) Talleres
17	MF	Fernando Leguizamón	15 March 2006 (aged 17)	(Paraguayan Football Association) Sportivo Ameliano
18	DF	Axel Balbuena	10 March 2006 (aged 17)	(Argentine Football Association) Lanús
19	FW	Juan Sánchez	28 January 2006 (aged 17)	(Paraguayan Football Association) Cerro Porteño
20	FW	César Miño	31 May 2007 (aged 15)	(Paraguayan Football Association) Guaraní
21	MF	Fernando Viveros	7 August 2006 (aged 16)	(Paraguayan Football Association) Libertad
22	GK	Dylan Bobadilla	15 December 2006 (aged 16)	(Paraguayan Football Association) Cerro Porteño
23	MF	Miguel Giménez	10 July 2006 (aged 16)	(Argentine Football Association) Estudiantes

=== Peru ===
Peru announced their squad of 23 players on 26 March 2023.

Head coach: Pablo Zegarra

No.	Pos.	Player	Date of birth (age)	Club
1	GK	Juan Pedro Durán	7 August 2006 (aged 16)	(Royal Spanish Football Federation) Cornellà
2	DF	Ghian Lucca Sotelo	12 June 2006 (aged 16)	(Peruvian Football Federation) Universidad San Martín
3	DF	Matías Barboza	20 January 2007 (aged 16)	(Argentine Football Association) Arsenal
4	DF	Fabrizzio Baylón	7 April 2006 (aged 16)	(Peruvian Football Federation) Sporting Cristal
5	DF	Bryan Córdova	16 October 2006 (aged 16)	(Peruvian Football Federation) Universidad César Vallejo
6	DF	Esteban Cruz	12 February 2006 (aged 17)	(Peruvian Football Federation) Universitario
7	MF	Hiroshi Mejía	9 July 2006 (aged 16)	(Peruvian Football Federation) Universitario
8	MF	Bassco Soyer	17 October 2006 (aged 16)	(Peruvian Football Federation) Alianza Lima
9	FW	Víctor Guzmán	25 March 2006 (aged 17)	(Peruvian Football Federation) Alianza Lima
10	MF	Thiago Salinas	14 July 2006 (aged 16)	(Peruvian Football Federation) Sporting Cristal
11	FW	Guillermo Grández	26 August 2006 (aged 16)	(Peruvian Football Federation) Universidad César Vallejo
12	GK	Jhefferson Rodríguez	13 March 2006 (aged 17)	(Peruvian Football Federation) Universitario
13	MF	Braidy Paz	1 February 2007 (aged 16)	(Peruvian Football Federation) Alianza Lima
14	MF	Felipe Chávez	10 April 2007 (aged 15)	(German Football Association) Bayern Munich
15	DF	Jussepi García	6 July 2007 (aged 15)	(Peruvian Football Federation) Alianza Lima
16	DF	Jhosenffer Yllescas	27 April 2006 (aged 16)	(Peruvian Football Federation) Alianza Lima
17	MF	Kelvin Abad	14 April 2006 (aged 16)	(Peruvian Football Federation) Universidad César Vallejo
18	MF	Yamir del Valle	13 February 2006 (aged 17)	(Peruvian Football Federation) Sporting Cristal
19	FW	Mateo Rodríguez	4 August 2006 (aged 16)	(Peruvian Football Federation) Sporting Cristal
20	MF	Philipp Eisele	19 January 2007 (aged 16)	(German Football Association) Eintracht Frankfurt
21	GK	Ian Schimitschek	18 April 2006 (aged 16)	(Peruvian Football Federation) Universidad San Martín
22	DF	Jair Moretti	1 February 2007 (aged 16)	(Peruvian Football Federation) Sporting Cristal
23	MF	Valentino Delgado	11 September 2006 (aged 16)	(Peruvian Football Federation) Cantolao

=== Venezuela ===
Venezuela announced their squad of 23 players on 15 March 2023. On 30 March 2023, defender David Useche withdrew from the squad due to injury and was replaced by Leenhan Romero.

Head coach: (Argentina) Ricardo Valiño

No.	Pos.	Player	Date of birth (age)	Club
1	GK	Jesús Lara	20 July 2006 (aged 16)	(Venezuelan Football Federation) Mineros de Guayana
2	DF	Leenhan Romero	1 November 2006 (aged 16)	(Football Federation of Chile) Universidad Católica
3	MF	Santiago Silva	1 May 2006 (aged 16)	(Royal Spanish Football Federation) Rayo Vallecano
4	DF	Juberth Bermúdez	23 June 2006 (aged 16)	(Venezuelan Football Federation) Mineros de Guayana
5	MF	José Correa	25 March 2006 (aged 17)	(Venezuelan Football Federation) Nueva Esparta
6	DF	Rai Hidalgo	14 February 2006 (aged 17)	(Venezuelan Football Federation) Academia Puerto Cabello
7	MF	Juan Campos	26 July 2007 (aged 15)	(Venezuelan Football Federation) Nueva Esparta
8	MF	Giovanny Sequera	14 February 2006 (aged 17)	(Venezuelan Football Federation) Metropolitanos
9	FW	Lucciano Reinoso	10 July 2006 (aged 16)	(Venezuelan Football Federation) Caracas
10	FW	David Martínez	7 February 2006 (aged 17)	(Venezuelan Football Federation) Monagas
11	FW	Juan Arango	27 February 2006 (aged 17)	(Royal Spanish Football Federation) Girona
12	GK	Jorge Sánchez	30 September 2006 (aged 16)	(Venezuelan Football Federation) Deportivo La Guaira
13	DF	Yaicar Perdomo	12 October 2006 (aged 16)	(Venezuelan Football Federation) Deportivo La Guaira
14	MF	Miguel Vegas	22 May 2006 (aged 16)	(Venezuelan Football Federation) Caracas
15	DF	Ángel Borgo	10 July 2006 (aged 16)	(Venezuelan Football Federation) Academia Puerto Cabello
16	DF	Óscar Hinojosa	5 December 2006 (aged 16)	(Venezuelan Football Federation) Metropolitanos
17	FW	Andrew Pereira	11 January 2007 (aged 16)	(Argentine Football Association) Newell's Old Boys
18	FW	Alejandro Cichero	11 July 2006 (aged 16)	(Uruguayan Football Association) Boston River
19	FW	Junior Colina	9 December 2006 (aged 16)	(Venezuelan Football Federation) Deportivo Rayo Zuliano
20	MF	Enmanuel Meléndez	2 November 2006 (aged 16)	(Venezuelan Football Federation) Deportivo Lara
21	DF	Jesús Martínez	11 April 2006 (aged 16)	(Venezuelan Football Federation) Caracas
22	FW	Maiken González	11 May 2006 (aged 16)	(Venezuelan Football Federation) Deportivo La Guaira
23	GK	Diego Ochoa	11 February 2007 (aged 16)	(Venezuelan Football Federation) Deportivo Miranda

=== Bolivia ===
Bolivia announced their squad of 23 players on 28 March 2023.

Head coach: Pablo Escobar

No.	Pos.	Player	Date of birth (age)	Club
1	GK	Victor Bolívia	12 April 2007 (aged 15)	(Brazilian Football Confederation) Ibrachina
2	DF	Anderson Ayhuana	30 January 2006 (aged 17)	(Bolivian Football Federation) Bolívar
3	DF	Iván Molina	24 April 2006 (aged 16)	(Bolivian Football Federation) Blooming
4	DF	Sergio Terrazas	12 January 2007 (aged 16)	(Argentine Football Association) Vélez Sarsfield
5	DF	Marcelo Torrez	8 July 2006 (aged 16)	(Brazilian Football Confederation) Santos
6	MF	Lucas Sánchez	17 May 2006 (aged 16)	(Bolivian Football Federation) Always Ready
7	MF	Braian Mamani	21 August 2006 (aged 16)	(Argentine Football Association) Atlético Tucumán
8	MF	Deybi Choque	19 September 2006 (aged 16)	(Bolivian Football Federation) Bolívar
9	FW	César Flores	7 January 2006 (aged 17)	(Argentine Football Association) Temperley
10	FW	Leonardo Viviani	21 September 2007 (aged 15)	(Bolivian Football Federation) Bolívar
11	FW	Moises Paniagua	16 August 2007 (aged 15)	(Bolivian Football Federation) Always Ready
12	GK	Fabián Pereira	16 May 2006 (aged 16)	(Bolivian Football Federation) Calleja
13	DF	Sebastián Altamirano	9 May 2006 (aged 16)	(Bolivian Football Federation) Yapacaní
14	DF	Ricardo Cadima	6 June 2006 (aged 16)	(Bolivian Football Federation) Academia Do Santos
15	MF	Ariel Pinto	26 March 2007 (aged 16)	(Bolivian Football Federation) Blooming
16	MF	Matías Galindo	10 April 2006 (aged 16)	(Bolivian Football Federation) Always Ready
17	MF	Bruno Méndez	20 December 2006 (aged 16)	(Bolivian Football Federation) Bolívar
18	FW	Jairo Rojas	29 July 2006 (aged 16)	(Bolivian Football Federation) Always Ready
19	FW	Alan Herbas	12 January 2006 (aged 17)	(Bolivian Football Federation) Calleja
20	MF	Bernardo Loroño	8 January 2006 (aged 17)	(Argentine Football Association) Argentinos Juniors
21	DF	Vladimir Gálvez	26 July 2006 (aged 16)	(Bolivian Football Federation) Academia Tahuichi Aguilera
22	MF	Gonzalo Mendoza	21 January 2006 (aged 17)	(Argentine Football Association) Argentinos Juniors
23	GK	Leonel Moreno	12 January 2007 (aged 16)	(Bolivian Football Federation) JMP Soccer School
