= Cycling at the 2010 South American Games – Men's BMX 20 inches wheel =

The Men's BMX 20" wheel event at the 2010 South American Games was held on March 18. The qualifications started at 9:20, the semifinals at 10:20 and the Final at 11:05.

== Medalists ==
Gold	Silver	Bronze
Augusto Castro; Colombia	José Díaz Montana; Colombia	Felipe Faundez; Chile

== Results ==
=== Qualification ===
==== Heat 1 ====
Rank	Rider	Run 1	Run 2	Run 3	Total
1	Augusto Castro (COL)	42.493 (1)	42.759 (2)	42.229 (1)	4 Q
2	Ramiro Marino (ARG)	44.289 (2)	42.272 (1)	43.145 (2)	5 Q
3	Jonathan Suárez (VEN)	45.934 (4)	44.848 (4)	43.988 (3)	11 Q
4	José Escudero Ordóñez (ECU)	45.422 (3)	43.456 (3)	1:09.340 (6)	12 Q
5	Elías Aguirre (CHI)	48.156 (5)	47.461 (6)	45.465 (4)	15
6	Ignacio Cruz Ormeno (CHI)	51.939 (6)	46.114 (5)	45.942 (5)	16

==== Heat 2 ====
Rank	Rider	Run 1	Run 2	Run 3	Total
1	Sergio Salazar (COL)	42.223 (1)	43.533 (2)	41.692 (1)	4 Q
2	José Díaz Montana (COL)	43.066 (2)	42.515 (1)	42.304 (2)	5 Q
3	Javier Colombo (ARG)	48.960 (4)	46.976 (3)	46.056 (3)	10 Q
4	Rendón Carvallo (BOL)	45.327 (5)	48.785 (5)	57.144 (5)	11 Q
5	Jose Roberto Reyes (ARU)	52.772 (5)	48.785 (5)	57.144 (5)	15
	Javier Reyes (VEN)	DNS (8)	DNS (8)		DSQ

==== Heat 3 ====
Rank	Rider	Run 1	Run 2	Run 3	Total
1	Andrés Jiménez (COL)	43.216 (1)	44.152 (1)	44.112 (2)	4 Q
2	Felipe Faundez (CHI)	44.234 (2)	48.240 (5)	43.837 (1)	8 Q
3	Alfredo Campo (ECU)	45.437 (4)	45.264 (2)	44.969 (4)	10 Q
4	Gustavo Chiara (BRA)	53.186 (5)	45.702 (3)	44.311 (5)	11 Q
5	José Luis Primera (VEN)	44.773 (3)	46.256 (4)	48.180 (5)	12

==== Heat 4 ====
Rank	Rider	Run 1	Run 2	Run 3	Total
1	Renato Rezende (BRA)	43.076 (1)	46.198 (4)	42.566 (1)	6 Q
2	Cristian Becerine (ARG)	43.894 (2)	43.160 (1)	44.633 (3)	6 Q
3	Fausto Endara Madera (ECU)	44.188 (3)	43.393 (2)	43.676 (2)	7 Q
4	Ignacio Katogui (ARG)	45.556 (4)	45.234 (3)	45.842 (4)	11 Q
5	Ishwar Martijn (ARU)	49.482 (5)	49.172 (5)	48.461 (5)	15

=== Semifinals ===
==== Heat 1 ====
Rank	Rider	Run	Q
1	Sergio Salazar (COL)	41.245	Q
2	Jonathan Suárez (VEN)	41.373	Q
3	José Díaz Montana (COL)	41.561	Q
4	Augusto Castro (COL)	41.813	Q
5	Ramiro Marino (ARG)	41.828	
6	José Escudero Ordóñez (ECU)	43.003	
7	Diego Mauricio Rendón (BOL)	54.025	
8	Javier Colombo (ARG)	55.958	

==== Heat 2 ====
Rank	Rider	Run	Q
1	Fausto Endara Madera (ECU)	41.738	Q
2	Cristian Becerine (ARG)	42.605	Q
3	Felipe Faundez (CHI)	42.701	Q
4	Ignacio Katogui (ARG)	44.171	Q
5	Alfredo Campo (ECU)	47.230	
6	Gustavo Chiara (BRA)	55.366	
7	Renato Rezende (BRA)	DNF	
8	Andrés Jiménez (COL)	DNF	

=== Final ===
Rank	Rider	Run
1st place, gold medalist(s)	Augusto Castro (COL)	40.881
2nd place, silver medalist(s)	José Díaz Montana (COL)	41.509
3rd place, bronze medalist(s)	Felipe Faundez (CHI)	43.906
4	Ignacio Katogui (ARG)	49.722
5	Jonathan Suárez (VEN)	1:35.443
6	Sergio Salazar (COL)	1:43.582
7	Fausto Endara Madera (ECU)	DNF
8	Cristian Becerine (ARG)	DNF
