= Cycling at the 2010 South American Games – Men's BMX 24 inches wheel =

The Men's BMX 24" wheel event at the 2010 South American Games was held on March 19. The qualifications started at 9:05, the semifinals at 10:05 and the Final at 10:40.

== Medalists ==
Gold	Silver	Bronze
Augusto Castro; Colombia	José Díaz Montana; Colombia	Andrés Jiménez; Colombia

== Results ==
=== Qualification ===
==== Heat 1 ====
Rank	Rider	Run 1	Run 2	Run 3	Total
1	Jonathan Suárez (VEN)	1:03.326 (1)	49.373 (1)	44.390 (1)	3 Q
2	Javier Colombo (ARG)	1:04.310 (2)	1:02.155 (2)	46.718 (2)	6 Q
3	Augusto Castro (COL)	1:04.958 (3)	1:02.504 (3)	48.737 (4)	10 Q
4	Ramiro Marino (ARG)	1:16.213 (4)	1:04.021 (4)	47.369 (3)	11 Q
	Javier Reyes (VEN)	DNS (7)	DNS (7)		DSQ

==== Heat 2 ====
Rank	Rider	Run 1	Run 2	Run 3	Total
1	Renato Rezende (BRA)	45.002 (1)	47.863 (3)	46.777 (1)	5 Q
2	Cristian Becerine (ARG)	47.203 (3)	47.475 (2)	47.575 (2)	7 Q
3	Ignacio Cruz Ormero (CHI)	50.179 (4)	47.172 (1)	47.930 (3)	8 Q
4	Ignacio Katogui (ARG)	46.029 (2)	49.103 (4)	58.936 (5)	11 Q
5	Jose Roberto Reyes (ARU)	56.770 (5)	49.674 (5)	48.808 (4)	14

==== Heat 3 ====
Rank	Rider	Run 1	Run 2	Run 3	Total
1	Felipe Faundez (CHI)	57.530 (3)	50.866 (1)	46.559 (1)	5 Q
2	Elías Aguirre (CHI)	52.163 (1)	54.958 (2)	47.807 (2)	5 Q
3	Diego Mauricio Rendón (BOL)	57.496 (2)	1:03.036 (3)	47.903 (3)	8 Q
	Ishwar Martijn (ARU)	DNS (7)	DNS (7)		DSQ
	Fausto Endara Madera (ECU)	DNS (7)	DNS (7)		DSQ

==== Heat 4 ====
Rank	Rider	Run 1	Run 2	Run 3	Total
1	Sergio Salazar (COL)	43.339 (1)	44.543 (1)	43;714 (3)	5 Q
2	Andrés Jiménez (COL)	44.587 (1)	44.888 (3)	43.230 (2)	6 Q
3	José Díaz Montana (COL)	44.134 (2)	44.888 (3)	43.230 (2)	7 Q
4	Gustavo Chiara (BRA)	45.479 (4)	46.868 (5)	1:01.766 (4)	13 Q
5	José Luis Primera (VEN)	45.614 (5)	44.951 (4)	DNF (5)	14

=== Semifinals ===
==== Heat 1 ====
Rank	Rider	Run	Q
1	Cristian Becerine (ARG)	43.221	Q
2	Javier Colombo (ARG)	43.645	Q
3	Renato Rezende (BRA)	43.663	Q
4	Augusto Castro (COL)	44.203	Q
5	Jonathan Suárez (VEN)	44.651	
6	Ramiro Marino (ARG)	45.322	
7	Ignacio Katogui (ARG)	47.409	
8	Ignacio Cruz Ormeno (CHI)	48.537	

==== Heat 2 ====
Rank	Rider	Run	Q
1	Sergio Salazar (COL)	41.878	Q
2	Andrés Jiménez (COL)	42.322	Q
3	José Díaz Montana (COL)	42.330	Q
4	Felipe Faundez (CHI)	44.267	Q
5	Elías Aguirre (CHI)	45.383	
6	Diego Mauricio Rendón (BOL)	46.946	
7	Gustavo Chiara (BRA)	1:04.384	

=== Final ===
Rank	Rider	Run
1st place, gold medalist(s)	Augusto Castro (COL)	40.618
2nd place, silver medalist(s)	José Díaz Montana (COL)	41.109
3rd place, bronze medalist(s)	Andrés Jiménez (COL)	42.884
4	Renato Rezende (BRA)	43.927
5	Javier Colombo (ARG)	44.106
6	Felipe Faundez (CHI)	47.802
7	Cristian Becerine (ARG)	58.329
8	Sergio Salazar (COL)	DNF
