= Cycling at the 2011 Pan American Games – Men's BMX =

Cycling – Men's BMX at the 2011 Pan American Games
- Venue: CODE San Nicolás
- Dates: October 21
- Competitors: 19 from 12 nations

Medalists
Gold medal	Connor Fields	United States
Silver medal	Nicholas Long	United States
Bronze medal	Andrés Jiménez	Colombia

The men's BMX competition of the cycling events at the 2011 Pan American Games was held on October 21 at the CODE San Nicolás in Guadalajara. The defending champion is Jason Richardson of United States.

== Schedule ==
All times are Central Standard Time (UTC-6).

Date	Time	Round
October 21, 2011	9:15	Qualification Run 1
October 21, 2011	9:35	Qualification Run 2
October 21, 2011	9:55	Qualification Run 3
October 21, 2011	10:15	Semifinal
October 21, 2011	10:45	Final

== Results ==
=== Qualification ===
First 4 riders in each heat qualify to semifinal.

Rank	Heat	Name	Nation	Run 1	Run 2	Run 3	Points	Notes
1	1	Fausto Endara	Ecuador	40.021 (4)	36.210 (1)	35.689 (2)	7	Q
2	1	Ramiro Marino	Argentina	36.372 (2)	36.522 (2)	36.249 (3)	7	Q
3	1	Connor Fields	United States	35.139 (1)	1:47.577 (6)	35.286 (1)	8	Q
4	1	Christopher Mireles	Mexico	41.229 (6)	37.388 (3)	37.161 (4)	13	Q
5	1	Isaías Zapata	Chile	37.028 (3)	38.486 (5)	37.512 (5)	13	
6	1	Sebastian Vargas	Bolivia	40.909 (5)	37.872 (4)	40.235 (6)	15	
7	1	Bryan Elisabeth	Aruba	57.487 (7)	DNF (7)	41.417 (7)	21	
1	2	Nicholas Long	United States	36.095 (1)	35.394 (1)	35.265 (1)	3	Q
2	2	Cristian Becerine	Argentina	36.433 (2)	36.516 (3)	36.311 (3)	8	Q
3	2	Renato Rezende	Brazil	36.703 (3)	36.496 (2)	37.407 (4)	9	Q
4	2	Jonathan Suárez	Venezuela	36.921 (4)	38.748 (4)	35.883 (2)	10	Q
5	2	Leonardo Bonilla	Bolivia	50.113 (6)	43.117 (5)	39.567 (5)	16	
6	2	Brian Perez	Puerto Rico	48.220 (5)	45.000 (6)	41.079 (6)	17	
1	3	Andrés Jiménez	Colombia	35.837 (1)	35.681 (1)	35.793 (2)	4	Q
2	3	Carlos Oquendo	Colombia	36.303 (2)	36.421 (2)	35.325 (1)	5	Q
3	3	James Brown	Canada	1:14.330 (6)	37.121 (3)	35.917 (3)	12	Q
4	3	Deivlim Balthazar	Brazil	39.177 (5)	44.269 (4)	37.333 (4)	13	Q
5	3	Felipe Faundez	Chile	37.394 (4)	1:26.702 (5)	49.207 (5)	14	
6	3	Emilio Falla	Ecuador	37.381 (3)	DNF (6)	DSQ (8)	17	

=== Semifinal ===
The top four cyclists advanced to the final.

Rank	Heat	Name	Nation	Time	Notes
1	1	Connor Fields	United States	34.648	Q
2	1	Fausto Endara	Ecuador	35.492	Q
3	1	Nicholas Long	United States	35.874	Q
4	1	Ramiro Marino	Argentina	36.541	Q
5	1	Christopher Mireles	Mexico	37.351	
6	1	Cristian Becerine	Argentina	DNF	
1	2	Andrés Jiménez	Colombia	33.559	Q
2	2	James Brown	Canada	34.639	Q
3	2	Carlos Oquendo	Colombia	35.047	Q
4	2	Renato Rezende	Brazil	35.197	Q
5	2	Jonathan Suárez	Venezuela	37.868	
6	2	Deivlim Balthazar	Brazil	57.937	

=== Final ===
Rank	Name	Nation	Time	Notes
1st place, gold medalist(s)	Connor Fields	United States	34.245	
2nd place, silver medalist(s)	Nicholas Long	United States	34.907	
3rd place, bronze medalist(s)	Andrés Jiménez	Colombia	35.323	
4	Fausto Endara	Ecuador	35.983	
5	Renato Rezende	Brazil	36.267	
6	Ramiro Marino	Argentina	36.457	
7	Carlos Oquendo	Colombia	36.765	
8	James Brown	Canada	40.263	
