= Água Branca =

Água Branca may refer to:

- Água Branca, Alagoas, a municipality in Alagoas, Brazil
- Água Branca, Paraíba, a municipality in Paraíba, Brazil
- Água Branca, Piauí, a municipality in Piauí, Brazil
