= Juan Arango (disambiguation) =

Juan Arango (born 1980) is a Venezuelan football attacking midfielder.

Juan Arango may also refer to:

- Juan Andrés Arango (born 1976), Colombian film director
- Juan Arango (cyclist) (born 1986), Colombian road and track cyclist
- Juan Arango Jr. (born 2006), Venezuelan football attacking midfielder and son of footballer of the same name born 1980

== See also ==
- Juan Urango (born 1980), Colombian professional boxer
