= List of Atrévete a soñar characters =

This is a list of characters featured in the Mexican telenovela, Atrévete a soñar.

== Cast ==
=== Peralta Castro family ===
Actor	Character
Danna Paola	Patricia "Patito" Peralta Castro
Vanessa Guzmán	Ana Castro López de Peralta
René Strickler	Rodrigo Peralta Jiménez
Julissa	Cristina Jiménez Viuda de Peralta

=== Rincón Peña family ===
Actor	Character
Cynthia Klitbo	Bianca Peña Brizzi de Rincon
Violeta Isfel	Antonella Rincón Peña
Alex Speitzer	Raymundo Rincón Peña
Pierre Angelo	Rico Peña Brizzi
Francisco Gattorno	Carlos Rincón Bravo

=== Las populares ===
Actor	Character
Ilean Almaguer	Catalina Novoa
Verónica Ibarra	Constanza
Samadhi	Amaya Villalpando
Adriana Ahumada	Marisol velez

=== Las divinas ===
Actor	Character
Nashla Aguilar	Paola Arizmendi
Natalia Juárez	Fabiola Escobedo Iturbide
Roxana Puente	Lucy Montalvo
Daniela Ibáñez	Nuria Nuriana
Michelle Prats	Sofi
Kendra Santacruz	Kimberly Williams

=== K&B ===
Actor	Character
Eleazar Gómez	Mateo Novoa
Alejandro Speitzer	Raymundo Rincón Peña
Miguel Martínez	Francisco
Jesús Zavala	Roger Hinojosa
Roberto Carlo	Renzo
Andrés Mercado	Iker
Lucas Velásquez	Axel

=== Supporting characters ===
Actor	Character
Raquel Garza	Nina
Ricardo Faslicht	Paulo
Luis Xavier	Guillermo Novoa
Claudia Vega	Clarissa
Gloria Izaguirre	Petra
Alberto Dogre	Giovanni
Yurem	Oliver
Gabriela Platas	Marina
Juan Diego Covarrubias	Johnny
Kika Edgar	Ingrid
Adanely Nuñez	Corina
Juan Verduzco	Adolfo Lafontaine
Siouzana Melikián	Vanessa
Patricio Borghetti	René/Federico
Alex Ibarra	Amadeus
Dobrina Cristeva	Aura Novoa
Mauricio Martínez	Gustavo
Marco Flavio Cruz	Delfino
Sergio Zaldívar	Román
Jenny Prats	Tamara
Ricardo Ceceña	Richie

Jaqueline Castro

“Victoria”

=== Special appearances ===
Actor	Character
Lourdes Munguía	Lucía
Alicia Machado	Electra
Benny Ibarra	Amado Cuevas
Laura G	Herself
Alejandro Felipe	Benjamín
Mónica Dossetti	Dr. Ibarrola
Ariadne Pellicer	Irene
Manuel Valdés	Christmas spirit that helps Patito
Amairani	Janet
Juan Ignacio Aranda	Sandro
Mariana Garza	Patricia
Nora Salinas	Herself
Rafael Inclán	Tamir
Archie Lanfranco	Padre Raúl
Pedro Armendáriz Jr.	Max Williams
Josefina Echánove	Mercedes Ferrer Contreras
Susana Zabaleta	Herself

== Special musical guests ==
During the telenovela, different artists participated, interacting with the cast. Here are some of the most notable:

- Paulina Rubio
- María José
- Moderatto
- The Veronicas
- David Bisbal
- Jonas Brothers
- Fanny Lú
- Luis Fonsi
- Fey
- Enrique Iglesias
