= Augusto Castro =

Colombian cyclist (born 1986)

Personal information
- Full name: Augusto Castro Herrera
- Nickname: Tin
- Born: 19 December 1986 (age 39) Medellín, Colombia
- Height: 1.85 m (6 ft 1 in)
- Weight: 88 kg (194 lb)

Cycling career
- Sport: Cycling
- Current team: Psykopath Industries
- Discipline: BMX racing
- Role: Rider
- Rider type: Off road
Medal record
Representing Colombia
Men's BMX racing
Event	1st	2nd	3rd
World Junior Championships	1	0	0
Pan American Championships	0	0	0
CAC Games	0	1	0
South American Games	2	1	0
Total	3	2	0
Pan American Championships
Bronze medal – third place	2010 Quito	BMX racing
Central American and Caribbean Games
Silver medal – second place	2010 Mayagüez	BMX racing
South American Games
Gold medal – first place	2010 Medellín	BMX cruiser
Gold medal – first place	2010 Medellín	BMX racing
Silver medal – second place	2006 Buenos Aires	BMX racing
World Junior Championships
Gold medal – first place	2004 Valkenswaard	BMX cruiser

Augusto Castro Herrera (born 19 December 1986) is a retired Colombian professional BMX cyclist. He represented his nation Colombia at the 2008 Summer Olympics, and has claimed multiple Colombian national titles in the men's elite category and a prestigious gold medal in junior cruiser at the 2004 UCI BMX World Championships in Valkenswaard, Netherlands. Before announcing his retirement in August 2013, Castro also raced and trained professionally for Psykopath Industries BMX Team.

Castro qualified for the Colombian squad, along with Andrés Jiménez and Sergio Salazar, in men's BMX cycling at the 2008 Summer Olympics in Beijing by receiving one of the nation's three available berths from the Union Cycliste Internationale based on his top-ten performance in the BMX World Rankings. Castro started his morning session by grabbing the seventh prelims seed in 36.301 seconds, but he could not match a more stellar ride in his quarterfinal heat with 14 positioning points and a fifth-place finish, narrowly missing out the semifinals by a single mark.
