= Iago André =

Brazilian footballer (born 2002)

Personal information
- Full name: Iago André Pires de Oliveira
- Date of birth: 28 January 2002 (age 24)
- Place of birth: Água Branca, Brazil
- Position: Winger

Team information
- Current team: Botafogo

Youth career
- Escolinha do Futuro
- Sport Recife
- 2017–2022: Athletico Paranaense
- 2022–2023: Botafogo

Senior career*
Years	Team	Apps	(Gls)
2023–	Botafogo	1	(0)

International career
2018	Brazil U17	4	(0)
- * Club domestic league appearances and goals as of 25 January 2023

Iago André Pires de Oliveira (born 28 January 2002), known as Iago André or simply Iago, is a Brazilian footballer who plays as a winger for Botafogo.

== Club career ==
Born in Água Branca, Piauí, Iago André joined Athletico Paranaense at the age of fifteen, having already played for Escolinha do Futuro and Sport Recife. In 2022, he joined Botafogo, and was promoted to the first team ahead of the 2023 season.

== International career ==
Iago André has represented Brazil at under-17 level.

== Career statistics ==
=== Club ===
As of 25 January 2023

Appearances and goals by club, season and competition
Club	Season	League			State League		Cup		Continental		Other		Total	
Club	Season	Division	Apps	Goals	Apps	Goals	Apps	Goals	Apps	Goals	Apps	Goals	Apps	Goals
Botafogo	2023	Série A	0	0	1 (Note: Appearances in the Campeonato Carioca)	0	0	0	0	0	0	0	1	0
Career total			0	0	1	0	0	0	0	0	0	0	1	0
