= Edson Tortolero =

Venezuelan footballer (born 1971)

Personal information
- Full name: Edson Argenis Tortolero Román
- Date of birth: 27 August 1971 (age 55)
- Place of birth: Venezuela
- Position: Midfielder

Senior career*
Years	Team	Apps	(Gls)
1989–1995	Minervén		
1998–1999	Estudiantes Mérida		
2000–2001	Deportivo Táchira		
2001–2002	Querétaro		
2002–2003	Carabobo		
2004–2005	Trujillanos		
2005–2006	Carabobo		

International career
1993–2006	Venezuela	39	(3)

Managerial career
- 2013–2016: C.D.Centenario
- * Club domestic league appearances and goals as of May 2009

Edson Argenis Tortolero Román (born 27 August 1971) is a former Venezuelan football midfielder who made a total number of 39 appearances for the Venezuela national team between 1993 and 2006.

== Club career ==
He started his professional career at Asociación Civil Minervén Fútbol Club.

== Personal life ==
Tortolero is the son of Argenis Tortolero, brother-in-law of Juan Arango, and uncle of Juan Arango Jr., all of whom were professional footballers.
