= Matheus Reis (footballer, born 2007) =

Brazilian footballer (born 2007)

Personal information
- Full name: Matheus Dos Reis Francisco
- Date of birth: 2 April 2007 (age 19)
- Place of birth: Mexico City, Mexico
- Height: 1.80 m (5 ft 11 in)
- Position: Forward

Team information
- Current team: Fluminense
- Number: 15

Youth career
- 2019–: Fluminense

Senior career*
Years	Team	Apps	(Gls)
2023–	Fluminense	4	(0)

International career
2023	Brazil U17	7	(1)
Medal record
Men's football
Representing Brazil
South American U-17 Championship
Winner	2023 Ecuador	Team
- * Club domestic league appearances and goals as of 6 April 2026

Matheus Dos Reis Francisco (born 2 April 2007), known as Matheus Reis, is a Mexican footballer who plays as a forward for Série A club Fluminense.

== Club career ==
Born in Mexico City to former professional footballer Elias who was playing for Pumas Morelos at the time. Having returned to Brazil as a child, he was raised in Cambará in the Brazilian state of Paraná and joined the academy of Fluminense in 2019. He signed his first professional contract with the club in May 2023 - a five-year deal.

On 15 October 2024, he was named by English newspaper The Guardian as one of the best players born in 2007 worldwide.

== International career ==
Having represented Brazil at the 2023 South American U-17 Championship, Reis was called up to the Mexico under-18 side in February 2024, featuring in a friendly match against the youth team of Deportivo Toluca. He remains eligible to represent both nations, but in late 2023 he was quoted as saying "without a doubt, Brazil" when asked who he would choose to represent when he turns eighteen.

== Honours ==
Brazil U17

- South American U-17 Championship: 2023

Individual

- The Guardian Best Young Talents In World Football: 2023
