= Bernardo Valim =

Brazilian footballer (born 2006)

Personal information
- Full name: Bernardo da Silva Rocha Valim
- Date of birth: 30 January 2006 (age 20)
- Place of birth: Niterói, Brazil
- Height: 1.86 m (6 ft 1 in)
- Position: Midfielder

Team information
- Current team: Botafogo
- Number: 30

Youth career
- 2017–: Botafogo

International career^{‡}
Years	Team	Apps	(Gls)
- Brazil U15
2022–	Brazil U16	4	(0)
- ‡ National team caps and goals as of 28 November 2022

Bernardo da Silva Rocha Valim (born 30 January 2006) is a Brazilian footballer who plays as a midfielder for Botafogo.

== Club career ==
Valim joined the academy of Botafogo in 2017, going on to sign his first professional contract with the club in August 2022. In October of the same year, he trained with the first team for the first time. The following month, he was included in the first team squad for a tour of England for a friendly match against Crystal Palace on 3 December, though he did not feature. He did, however, feature in a training game against Charlton Athletic the previous week.

He was set to be included in the squad for a tour of the United States in January 2023, and although this was cancelled, he was integrated into Botafogo's main squad for the 2023 season, alongside teammates Iago André and JP Galvão.

== International career ==
Valim was first called up to the Brazil under-15 team in June 2021. He was also part of the Brazilian under-16 squad at the 2022 Montaigu Tournament.

== Style of play ==
Known for his good passing ability, which has led to him getting many assists for the youth teams of Botafogo, Valim is also a good finisher. Tending not to dribble with the ball, his anticipation was noted by his coach at under-17 level, Pedro Gabriel, who also commended the player for his versatility, calling him a "complete and modern midfielder".
