= Marcelo Torrez =

Bolivian footballer (born 2006)

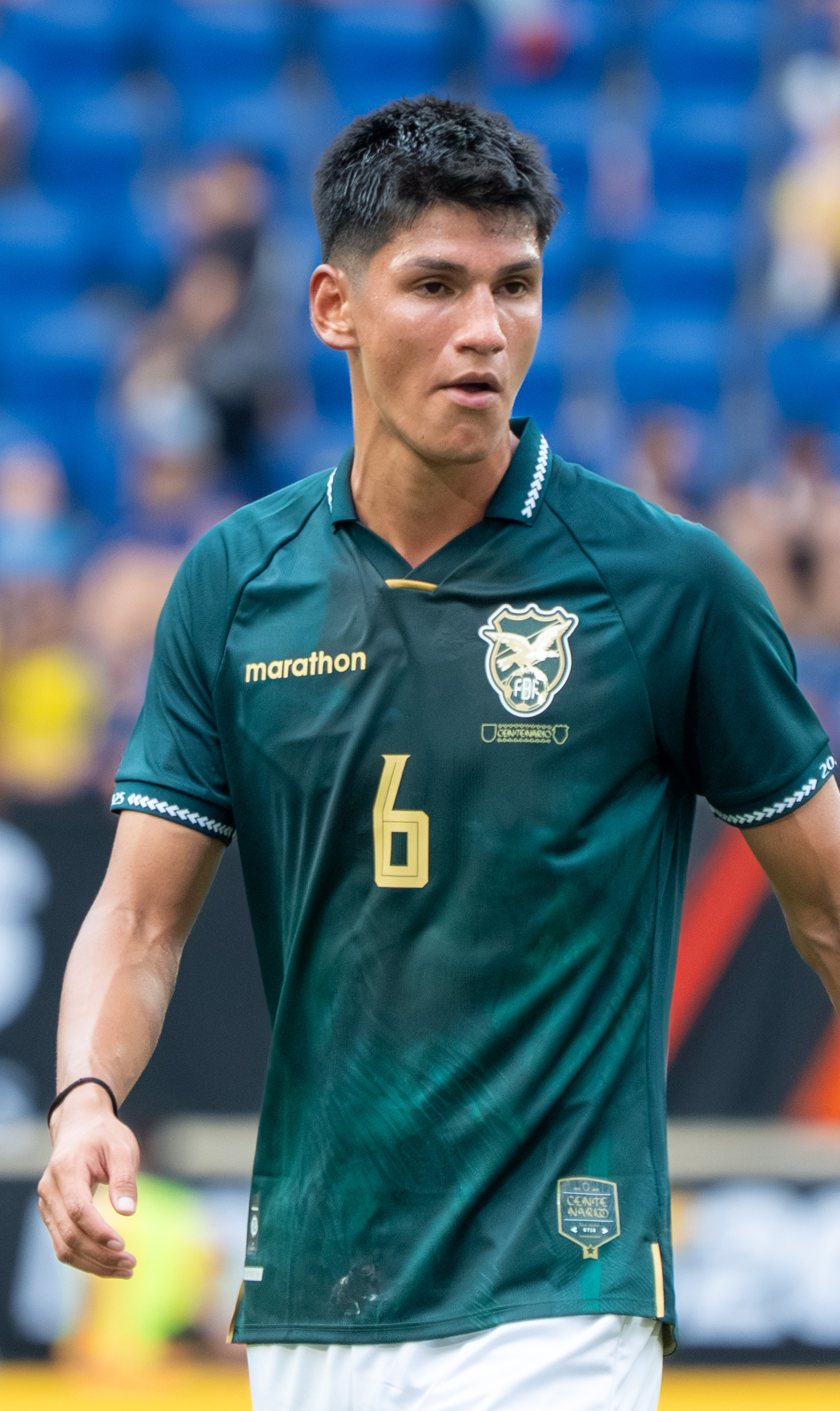
- Torrez with Bolivia in 2026

Personal information
- Full name: Marcelo Jesús Torrez Contreras
- Date of birth: 8 July 2006 (age 20)
- Place of birth: Villamontes, Bolivia
- Height: 1.89 m (6 ft 2 in)
- Position: Centre-back

Team information
- Current team: Santos
- Number: 99

Youth career
- Atlético Pilcomayo
- 2020–2022: Proyecto Bolivia 2022
- 2022–: Santos

International career^{‡}
Years	Team	Apps	(Gls)
2023	Bolivia U17	4	(1)
2025–	Bolivia U20	4	(0)
2025–	Bolivia	9	(0)
- ‡ National team caps and goals as of 22:13, 30 September 2026 (UTC)

Marcelo Jesús Torrez Contreras (born 8 July 2006) is a Bolivian professional footballer who plays as a centre-back for Brazilian club Santos and the Bolivia national team.

== Club career ==
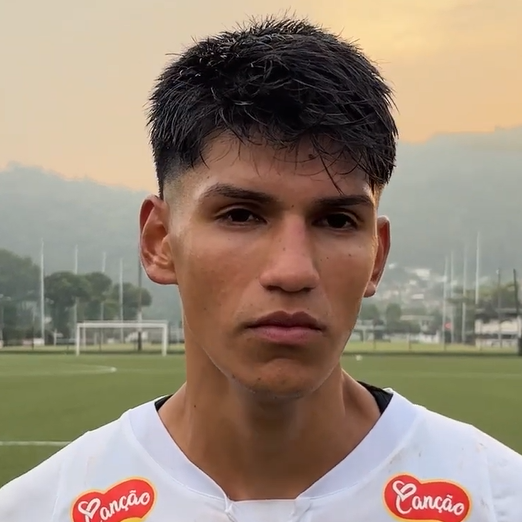
Torrez with the under-20 team of Santos in 2024

Born in Villamontes, Tarija, Torrez began his career with local side Club Atlético Pilcomayo before joining Proyecto Bolivia 2022, a project created to encourage the development of young Bolivian men's footballers, in 2020. In 2021, he went on a trial at Santos, subsequently joining the club in the following year but being unable to sign a contract due to the FIFA rules over underage players.

Torrez signed his first professional contract with Santos on 17 July 2024, shortly after his 18th birthday. On 28 August 2026, he further extended his link until July 2028.

== International career ==
Torrez represented the Bolivia national under-17 team at the 2023 South American U-17 Championship, making four appearances and scoring once in a 3–1 loss to Paraguay; he was also team captain of the side in the tournament. On 19 August 2024, he was called up to the Bolivia national under-19 team for a period of trainings.

On 23 August 2024, Torrez was included in Óscar Villegas' first call-up to the full side for two 2026 FIFA World Cup qualifiers against Venezuela and Chile. He made his full international debut on 13 November 2025, starting in a 2–0 friendly loss to South Korea.

== Career statistics ==
=== International ===
As of 30 September 2026

Appearances and goals by national team and year
National team	Year	Apps	Goals
Bolivia	2025	3	0
Bolivia	2026	6	0
Total		9	0

== Honours ==
Santos U20

- Campeonato Paulista Sub-20: 2025
