= Argenis Tortolero =

Venezuelan footballer (1941–2011)

Personal information
- Date of birth: 16 March 1941
- Date of death: 3 August 2011 (aged 70)
- Position: Midfielder

International career
Years	Team	Apps	(Gls)
1967	Venezuela	5	(0)

Argenis Tortolero (16 March 1941 – 3 August 2011) was a Venezuelan footballer. He played in five matches for the Venezuela national football team in 1967. He was also part of Venezuela's squad for the 1967 South American Championship.

== Personal life ==
Tortolero is the father of Edson Tortolero, father-in-law of Juan Arango, and grandfather of Juan Arango Jr., all of whom were professional footballers.
