= Junior Colina =

Venezuelan footballer (born 2006)

Personal information
- Full name: Junior Alexander Colina Bracho
- Date of birth: 9 December 2006 (age 19)
- Place of birth: Maracaibo, Zulia, Venezuela
- Height: 1.73 m (5 ft 8 in)
- Position: Forward

Team information
- Current team: Rio Ave

Youth career
- Petroleros
- 2021–2023: Rayo Zuliano

Senior career*
Years	Team	Apps	(Gls)
2023–2025	Rayo Zuliano	21	(3)
2025–	Rio Ave	0	(0)

International career^{‡}
2023	Venezuela U17	11	(2)
- * Club domestic league appearances and goals as of 16:53, 21 May 2025 (UTC) ‡ National team caps and goals as of 16:53, 21 May 2025 (UTC)

Junior Alexander Colina Bracho (born 9 December 2006) is a Venezuelan footballer who currently plays as a forward for Portuguese club Rio Ave.

== Early life ==
Born in Maracaibo in the Venezuelan state of Zulia and raised in the Negro Primero neighbourhood, Colina worked a number of jobs during his youth. He helped his father, a bus driver, as a fare collector on his routes, as well as selling garlic and working in stores.

== Club career ==
As a child, Colina would play on local farms and dirt fields of Los Cortijos in Maracaibo, as well as in San Francisco. At the age of six, his father took him to a club named Petroleros, where he met former Venezuelan international footballer Freddy Elie. After returning to street football, he received a call from Elie telling him to go to El Callao field the following day, where professional club Rayo Zuliano would be conducting trials.

Having attended the trial, he joined the academy of Rayo Zuliano at the age of fourteen in 2021, and just a year later he was the club's top scorer in the national youth league. The following year he made his professional debut, which he marked with a goal in Rayo Zuliano's 4–4 draw with Mineros de Guayana on 26 February 2023.

Having long been linked with a move to Europe, Colina joined Portuguese Primera Liga club Rio Ave in January 2025.

== International career ==
Colina was first called up to the Venezuela under-17 side in March 2023. He remained in the squad for the 2023 South American U-17 Championship, and scored two goals, against Argentina and Ecuador, helping his side to a fourth-place finish. On his return to Venezuela following the tournament, he was greeted at La Chinita International Airport by dozens of fans, as well as youth and senior players of Rayo Zuliano.

Called up again to the squad for the 2023 FIFA U-17 World Cup, Colina made little impact on Venezuela's unsuccessful campaign, highlighted by their 3–0 defeat to Germany, where Colina asked fans to "trust [them]", and that the squad would "bring the jersey forward for the country".

== Career statistics ==
=== Club ===
As of 19 May 2025.

Appearances and goals by club, season and competition
Club	Season	League			Cup (Note: Includes Copa Venezuela and Taça de Portugal)		Continental		Other		Total	
Club	Season	Division	Apps	Goals	Apps	Goals	Apps	Goals	Apps	Goals	Apps	Goals
Rayo Zuliano	2023	Venezuelan Primera División	11	2	0	0	–		0	0	11	2
Rayo Zuliano	2024	Venezuelan Primera División	10	1	0	0	5 (Note: Appearances in the Copa Sudamericana)	0	0	0	15	1
Rayo Zuliano	Total		21	3	0	0	5	0	0	0	26	3
Rio Ave	2024–25	Primeira Liga	0	0	0	0	–		0	0	0	0
Career total			21	3	0	0	5	0	0	0	26	3
