= Lucas Velásquez =

Chilean footballer

Personal information
- Full name: Lucas Amaru Velásquez Tenorio
- Date of birth: 2 February 2006 (age 20)
- Place of birth: Puerto Varas, Chile
- Height: 1.71 m (5 ft 7 in)
- Position: Left-back

Team information
- Current team: Huachipato
- Number: 27

Youth career
- Colegio Felmer Niklitschek
- Huachipato Puerto Montt
- 2019–2024: Huachipato

Senior career*
Years	Team	Apps	(Gls)
2025–	Huachipato	25	(0)

International career^{‡}
2020	Chile U15		
2023	Chile U17	8	(0)
2023–2025	Chile U20	4	(1)
- * Club domestic league appearances and goals as of 24 June 2026 ‡ National team caps and goals as of 24 June 2026

Lucas Amaru Velásquez Tenorio (born 2 February 2006) is a Chilean professional footballer who plays as a left-back for Huachipato. He can also operate as a left midfielder or left winger.

== Club career ==
Born in Puerto Varas, Chile, Velásquez represented the team of Colegio Felmer Niklitschek and was trained at Huachipato Puerto Montt before joining Huachipato at the age of 13. He made his professional debut in the 0–12 away win against Presidente Ibáñez in the 2024 Copa Chile. He made his debut in the Chilean Primera División in the 4–0 home victory against Everton de Viña del Mar on 23 February 2025 and won the Copa Chile in the same year. He got regularity during the 2026 season.

== International career ==
Velásquez represented Chile at under-15 level in 2020 and later represented the under-17's in the 2023 South American Championship.

In December 2023, Velásquez represented the under-20's in the friendly tournament Torneo Promesas in Asunción, Paraguay, scoring a goal. On 4 June, he made another appearance in the friendly match against New Zealand on 4 June 2025 and was included in the preliminary squad for the 2025 FIFA World Cup.

== Honours ==
Huachipato

- Copa Chile: 2025
