= 2021 South American U-17 Championship =

CONMEBOL Sudamericano Sub-17 Ecuador 2021

Tournament details
- Host country: Ecuador
- Dates: Cancelled
- Teams: 10 (from 1 confederation)

The 2021 South American U-17 Championship was originally going be the 19th edition of the South American U-17 Championship (Spanish: CONMEBOL Sudamericano Sub-17), the biennial international youth football championship organised by CONMEBOL for the men's under-17 national teams of South America. It was scheduled to be held in Ecuador between 31 March – 25 April 2021, before its suspension and subsequent cancellation due to the COVID-19 pandemic.

On 22 December 2020 CONMEBOL announced that the tournament would be rescheduled to the second half of 2021 if FIFA decided to cancel the 2021 FIFA U-17 World Cup, which was confirmed two days later. On 28 December 2020, CONMEBOL confirmed the rescheduling of the tournament, despite the fact that the Colombian Football Federation had announced its cancellation, with October as a possible tentative date and keeping Ecuador as the host country. Eventually, CONMEBOL decided to cancel the tournament during a meeting of its council held on 3 August 2021.

As the 2021 FIFA U-17 World Cup was cancelled due to the COVID-19 pandemic, this tournament would not have served as qualifier for any FIFA U-17 World Cup. Originally the top four teams would have qualified as the CONMEBOL representatives, together with Peru which would have qualified automatically as the World Cup hosts (fifth-placed team would also have qualified if Peru were among the top four).

Argentina are the defending champions.

== Teams ==
All ten CONMEBOL member national teams are eligible to enter the tournament.

Team	Appearance	Previous best performance
Argentina (holders)	19th	Champions (4 times, most recent 2019)
Bolivia	19th	Champions (1 time, 1986)
Brazil	19th	Champions (12 times, most recent 2017)
Chile	19th	Runners-up (3 times, most recent 2019)
Colombia	19th	Champions (1 time, 1993)
Ecuador (hosts)	18th	Third place (4 times, most recent 2015)
Paraguay	18th	Runners-up (1 time, 1999)
Peru	19th	Fourth place (1 time, 2007)
Uruguay	19th	Runners-up (3 times, most recent 2011)
Venezuela	19th	Runners-up (1 time, 2013)

== Venues ==
To be confirmed.

== Squads ==
Players born on or after 1 January 2004 are eligible to compete.

== Qualified teams for FIFA U-17 World Cup ==
As hosts, Peru were the only CONMEBOL representative qualified for the 2021 FIFA U-17 World Cup at the time of the tournament's cancellation.

Team	Qualified on	Previous appearances in FIFA U-17 World Cup^{1}
Peru	24 October 2019	2 (2005, 2007)
