= 2023 South American U-17 Championship =

CONMEBOL Sub 17 Ecuador 2023

Tournament details
- Host country: Ecuador
- Dates: 30 March – 23 April
- Teams: 10 (from 1 confederation)
- Venue: 5 (in 2 host cities)

Final positions
- Champions: Brazil (13th title)
- Runners-up: Ecuador
- Third place: Argentina
- Fourth place: Venezuela

Tournament statistics
- Matches played: 35
- Goals scored: 93 (2.66 per match)
- Top scorer(s): (Argentina) Claudio Echeverri (Brazil) Kauã Elias (Brazil) Rayan (5 goals each)

The 2023 South American U-17 Championship was the 19th edition of the South American U-17 Championship (Spanish: CONMEBOL Sudamericano Sub-17), the biennial international youth football championship organized by CONMEBOL for the men's under-17 national teams of South America. It was held in Ecuador between 30 March and 23 April 2023. This was the first U-17 championship in four years due to the COVID-19 pandemic forcing CONMEBOL to cancel the tournament in 2021.

Like previous editions, the tournament served as the CONMEBOL qualifiers for the FIFA U-17 World Cup. The top four teams of the tournament qualified for the 2023 FIFA U-17 World Cup in Indonesia as the CONMEBOL representatives. Brazil won their thirteenth South American U-17 title after finishing first in the final stage's group and a spot at the World Cup. They were joined by the other top four teams in Ecuador, Argentina and Venezuela.

== Teams ==
All ten CONMEBOL member national teams were eligible to enter the tournament.

Team	Appearance	Previous best performance
Argentina (holders)	19th	Champions (4 times, most recent 2019)
Bolivia	19th	Champions (1 time, 1986)
Brazil	19th	Champions (12 times, most recent 2017)
Chile	19th	Runners-up (3 times, most recent 2019)
Colombia	19th	Champions (1 time, 1993)
Ecuador (hosts)	18th	Third place (4 times, most recent 2015)
Paraguay	18th	Runners-up (1 time, 1999)
Peru	19th	Fourth place (1 time, 2007)
Uruguay	19th	Runners-up (3 times, most recent 2011)
Venezuela	19th	Runners-up (1 time, 2013)

== Venues ==
Ecuador was originally chosen to host the 2021 South American U-17 Championship. Although the tournament was canceled due to the COVID-19 pandemic, Ecuador maintained its right to hold the South American U-17 Championship in 2023. It was the fourth time that Ecuador hosted the tournament, having previously done so in 1988 (under-16 edition), 2007 and 2011.

Guayaquil and Quito were selected as host cities. Originally, Guayaquil would host the first stage matches in two venues, the Christian Benítez Betancourt and George Capwell stadiums. Subsequently, the Estadio Monumental Isidro Romero Carbo was added as a venue to host four matches of Group A. The matches in the final stage were played in Quito in two venues, the Olímpico Atahualpa and Rodrigo Paz Delgado stadiums.

2023 South American U-17 Championship is located in Ecuador	Quito	
2023 South American U-17 Championship is located in Ecuador	Estadio Olímpico Atahualpa	Estadio Rodrigo Paz Delgado
2023 South American U-17 Championship is located in Ecuador	Capacity: 35,258	Capacity: 41,575
Guayaquil
Estadio Christian Benítez Betancourt	Estadio George Capwell	Estadio Monumental Isidro Romero Carbo
Capacity: 10,152	Capacity: 40,020	Capacity: 57,267

== Match officials ==
On 23 February 2023, CONMEBOL announced a total of 11 referees and 22 assistant referees appointed for the tournament, included a UEFA refereeing team which was later confirmed to be Italian. For the first time, a UEFA refereeing team participated in the South American U-17 Championship as part of the UEFA–CONMEBOL memorandum of understanding signed in February 2020, which included a referee exchange programme.

Chilean referee Nicolás Gamboa was replaced by his fellow countryman Felipe González.

- (Argentina) Andrés Merlos
  - Assistants: Pablo González and Sebastián Raineiri
- (Bolivia) Dilio Rodríguez
  - Assistants: Roger Orellana and Rubén Flores
- (Brazil) Savio Sampaio
  - Assistants: Guillerme Dias Camilo and Nailton Sousa
- (Chile) Felipe González
  - Assistants: Juan Serrano and Carlos Poblete
- (Colombia) Carlos Betancur
  - Assistants: Miguel Roldán and Richard Ortiz
- (Ecuador) Augusto Aragón
  - Assistants: Juan Aguiar and Andrés Tola
- (Italy) Simone Sozza
  - Assistants: Giovanni Baccini and Davide Imperiale
- (Peru) Michael Espinoza
  - Assistants: Coty Carrera and Enrique Pinto
- (Uruguay) José Burgos
  - Assistants: Pablo Llarena and Santiago Fernández
- (Venezuela) Ángel Arteaga
  - Assistants: Carlos López and Antoni García

Support Referees

- (Colombia) David Fuentes (assistant referee)
- (Peru) Bruno Pérez (main referee)
- (Uruguay) Agustín Berisso (assistant referee)

== Squads ==
Players born between 1 January 2006 and 31 December 2010 were eligible to compete in the tournament. Each team could register a maximum of 23 and a minimum of 19 players, including at least 3 goalkeepers (Regulations Articles 46 and 49).

== Draw ==
The draw of the tournament was held on 24 February 2023, 12:00 PYT (UTC−3), at the CONMEBOL headquarters in Luque, Paraguay. The ten teams were drawn into two groups of five. The hosts Ecuador and defending champions Argentina were seeded into Group A and Group B respectively and assigned to position 1 in their group, while the remaining teams were placed into four "pairing pots" according to their results in the 2019 South American U-17 Championship (shown in brackets).

Seeded	Pot 1	Pot 2	Pot 3	Pot 4
Ecuador (4) (Hosts, assigned to A1); Argentina (1) (Title holders, assigned to B1)	Chile (2); Paraguay (3)	Peru (5); Uruguay (6)	Brazil (7); Venezuela (8)	Colombia (9); Bolivia (10)

From each pot, the first team drawn was placed into Group A and the second team drawn was placed into Group B. In both groups, teams from pot 1 were allocated in position 2, teams from pot 2 in position 3, teams from pot 3 in position 4 and teams from pot 4 in position 5.

The draw resulted in the following groups:

Group A
Pos	Team
A1	Ecuador
A2	Chile
A3	Uruguay
A4	Brazil
A5	Colombia

Group B
Pos	Team
B1	Argentina
B2	Paraguay
B3	Peru
B4	Venezuela
B5	Bolivia

== First stage ==
The top three teams in each group will advance to the final stage.

Tiebreakers

In the first stage, teams were ranked according to points earned (3 points for a win, 1 point for a draw, 0 points for a loss). If tied on points, tiebreakers would be applied in the following order (Regulations Article 21):

1. Head-to-head result between tied teams;
  - Points in head-to-head matches among the tied teams;
  - Goal difference in head-to-head matches among the tied teams;
  - Goals scored in head-to-head matches among the tied teams;
2. Goal difference in all group matches;
3. Goals scored in all group matches;
4. Fewest red cards received;
5. Fewest yellow cards received;
6. Drawing of lots.

All match times are in ECT (UTC−5), as listed by CONMEBOL.

=== Group A ===
On 1 April, CONMEBOL announced that matches played on Matchday 3 and 4 in Group A would be moved to the Estadio Monumental Isidro Romero Carbo due to the poor conditions of the field at the Estadio Christian Benítez Betancourt, the original venue for these matches.

Pos	Team	Pld	W	D	L	GF	GA	GD	Pts	Qualification
1	Brazil	4	3	1	0	11	3	+8	10	Final stage
2	Chile	4	2	1	1	5	4	+1	7	Final stage
3	Ecuador (H)	4	1	2	1	7	5	+2	5	Final stage
4	Uruguay	4	1	1	2	2	5	−3	4	
5	Colombia	4	0	1	3	1	9	−8	1	

Source: CONMEBOL
Rules for classification: Tiebreakers
(H) Hosts
30 March 2023
16:30

Colombia	0–0	Uruguay
	Report

Estadio Christian Benítez Betancourt, Guayaquil
Attendance: 1,117
Referee: Andrés Merlos (Argentina)
30 March 2023
19:00

Ecuador	2–2	Brazil
Reyes 87'; De Jesús 90+1'	Report	Kauã Elias 23', 36'

Estadio Christian Benítez Betancourt, Guayaquil
Attendance: 4,000
Referee: Bruno Pérez (Peru)

1 April 2023
16:30

Brazil	3–0	Chile
Kauã Elias 30', 36'; João Pedro 87'	Report

Estadio Christian Benítez Betancourt, Guayaquil
Referee: Ángel Arteaga (Venezuela)
1 April 2023
19:00

Colombia	0–4	Ecuador
	Report	Obando 26', 81'; De Jesús 76'; Bermúdez 88'

Estadio Christian Benítez Betancourt, Guayaquil
Attendance: 4,500
Referee: Dilio Rodríguez (Bolivia)

3 April 2023
16:30

Chile	2–0	Uruguay
Hales 33'; Román 59'	Report

Estadio Monumental Isidro Romero Carbo, Guayaquil
Referee: Bruno Pérez (Peru)
3 April 2023
19:00

Brazil	3–1	Colombia
Dudu 54' (pen.); Riquelme Fillipi 69'; Rayan 87'	Report	López 67'

Estadio Monumental Isidro Romero Carbo, Guayaquil
Attendance: 390
Referee: Simone Sozza (Italy)

5 April 2023
16:30 (Note: The Chile vs Colombia match was stopped during the half-time and resumed one hour later due to the weather conditions; consequently, the next match Uruguay vs Ecuador, originally scheduled at 19:00 ECT (UTC−5), was delayed until 20:00 ECT.)

Chile	2–0	Colombia
Campos 57'; Riquelme 77'	Report

Estadio Monumental Isidro Romero Carbo, Guayaquil
Attendance: 2,430
Referee: Ángel Arteaga (Venezuela)
5 April 2023
20:00

Uruguay	2–0	Ecuador
González 47'; Barone 77' (pen.)	Report

Estadio Monumental Isidro Romero Carbo, Guayaquil
Referee: Andrés Merlos (Argentina)

7 April 2023
19:00

Ecuador	1–1	Chile
Bermúdez 55'	Report	Ampuero 39'

Estadio Christian Benítez Betancourt, Guayaquil
Referee: Bruno Pérez (Peru)
7 April 2023
19:00

Uruguay	0–3	Brazil
	Report	Rayan 66'; Lorran 84'; Matheus Reis 90'

Estadio George Capwell, Guayaquil
Referee: Ángel Arteaga (Venezuela)

=== Group B ===
Pos	Team	Pld	W	D	L	GF	GA	GD	Pts	Qualification
1	Argentina	4	3	1	0	9	3	+6	10	Final stage
2	Paraguay	4	2	2	0	9	3	+6	8	Final stage
3	Venezuela	4	1	2	1	5	5	0	5	Final stage
4	Bolivia	4	1	0	3	3	7	−4	3	
5	Peru	4	0	1	3	1	9	−8	1	

Source: CONMEBOL
Rules for classification: Tiebreakers
31 March 2023
16:30

Bolivia	2–1	Peru
Paniagua 70'; Mamani 90+2'	Report	Soyer 29'

Estadio George Capwell, Guayaquil
Attendance: 250
Referee: Savio Sampaio (Brazil)
31 March 2023
19:00

Argentina	4–2	Venezuela
Echeverri 14'; López 21'; Ruberto 45+1', 63'	Report	Martínez 31' (pen.); Colina 36'

Estadio George Capwell, Guayaquil
Referee: Carlos Betancur (Colombia)

2 April 2023
16:30 (Note: The Venezuela vs Paraguay match was stopped after 12 minutes of play and resumed one hour later due to the poor conditions of the field because of rain; consequently, the next match Bolivia vs Argentina, originally scheduled at 19:00 ECT (UTC−5), was delayed until 20:30 ECT.)

Venezuela	1–1	Paraguay
Martínez 90+2'	Report	Villalba 62' (pen.)

Estadio George Capwell, Guayaquil
Referee: Felipe González (Chile)
2 April 2023
20:30

Bolivia	0–1	Argentina
	Report	Acuña 69'

Estadio George Capwell, Guayaquil
Referee: Augusto Aragón (Ecuador)

4 April 2023
18:00 (Note: The Venezuela vs Bolivia match, originally scheduled at 16:30 ECT (UTC−5), was delayed until 18:00 ECT due to the weather conditions; consequently, the next match Paraguay vs Peru, originally scheduled at 19:00 ECT (UTC−5), was delayed until 20:30 ECT.)

Venezuela	2–0	Bolivia
Martínez 53'; Arango 61'	Report

Estadio George Capwell, Guayaquil
Referee: Savio Sampaio (Brazil)
4 April 2023
20:30

Paraguay	4–0	Peru
Villalba 38'; Miño 67', 74'; Mora 84'	Report

Estadio George Capwell, Guayaquil
Referee: José Burgos (Uruguay)

6 April 2023
16:30

Paraguay	3–1	Bolivia
Villalba 20'; Torrez 32' (o.g.); Riveros 37'	Report	Torrez 84'

Estadio George Capwell, Guayaquil
Referee: Carlos Betancur (Colombia)
6 April 2023
19:00

Peru	0–3	Argentina
	Report	Echeverri 17', 37'; Ruberto 22'

Estadio George Capwell, Guayaquil
Referee: Augusto Aragón (Ecuador)

8 April 2023
19:00

Argentina	1–1	Paraguay
Gutiérrez 87'	Report	Balbuena 34'

Estadio George Capwell, Guayaquil
Referee: Felipe González (Chile)
8 April 2023
19:00

Peru	0–0	Venezuela
	Report

Estadio Christian Benítez Betancourt, Guayaquil
Referee: José Burgos (Uruguay)

== Final stage ==
If teams finish level on points, the final rankings will be determined according to the same criteria as the first stage, taking into account only matches in the final stage.

All match times are in ECT (UTC−5), as listed by CONMEBOL.

Pos	Team	Pld	W	D	L	GF	GA	GD	Pts	Qualification
1	Brazil (C)	5	4	1	0	13	7	+6	13	2023 FIFA U-17 World Cup
2	Ecuador (H)	5	3	2	0	10	4	+6	11	2023 FIFA U-17 World Cup
3	Argentina	5	2	1	2	6	5	+1	7 (Note: Head-to-head points: Argentina 3, Venezuela 0.)	2023 FIFA U-17 World Cup
4	Venezuela	5	2	1	2	7	5	+2	7	2023 FIFA U-17 World Cup
5	Paraguay	5	1	1	3	4	8	−4	4	
6	Chile	5	0	0	5	0	11	−11	0	

Rules for classification: Tiebreakers
(C) Champions; (H) Hosts
Notes:
11 April 2023
14:00

Argentina	2–0	Chile
Campos 42' (o.g.); Echeverri 45+2'	Report

Estadio Rodrigo Paz Delgado, Quito
Referee: Carlos Betancur (Colombia)
11 April 2023
16:30

Brazil	2–1	Venezuela
João Pedro 6'; Dudu 33'	Report	Arango 52'

Estadio Olímpico Atahualpa, Quito
Referee: Bruno Pérez (Peru)
11 April 2023
19:00

Ecuador	3–1	Paraguay
Rodríguez 43'; Bermúdez 61'; Arroyo 90+2' (pen.)	Report	Villalba 19'

Estadio Olímpico Atahualpa, Quito
Referee: José Burgos (Uruguay)

14 April 2023
14:00

Brazil	3–2	Paraguay
Gómez 23' (o.g.); Rayan 42'; Luiz Gustavo 79'	Report	Riveros 19'; Aguayo 90+2'

Estadio Rodrigo Paz Delgado, Quito
Referee: Felipe González (Chile)
14 April 2023
16:30

Argentina	2–1	Venezuela
López 15', 45+5'	Report	Reinoso 24'

Estadio Rodrigo Paz Delgado, Quito
Referee: Augusto Aragón (Ecuador)
14 April 2023
19:00

Chile	0–3	Ecuador
	Report	Bermúdez 40'; Obando 57'; De Jesús 90+2'

Estadio Olímpico Atahualpa, Quito
Referee: Bruno Pérez (Peru)

17 April 2023
14:00

Paraguay	0–0	Argentina
	Report

Estadio Rodrigo Paz Delgado, Quito
Referee: Carlos Betancur (Colombia)
17 April 2023
16:30

Chile	0–2	Venezuela
	Report	Hidalgo 70'; Meléndez 85'

Estadio Olímpico Atahualpa, Quito
Referee: Dilio Rodríguez (Bolivia)
17 April 2023
19:00

Ecuador	2–2	Brazil
Arroyo 23', 38'	Report	Collahuazo 45' (o.g.); Kauã Elias 52'

Estadio Olímpico Atahualpa, Quito
Referee: Simone Sozza (Italy)

20 April 2023
14:00

Venezuela	2–0	Paraguay
Martínez 70'; González 85'	Report

Estadio Rodrigo Paz Delgado, Quito
Referee: Savio Sampaio (Brazil)
20 April 2023
16:30

Chile	0–3	Brazil
	Report	Rayan 11' (pen.), 31'; Ricardo 59'

Estadio Rodrigo Paz Delgado, Quito
Referee: Carlos Betancur (Colombia)
20 April 2023
19:00

Argentina	0–1	Ecuador
	Report	Páez 6'

Estadio Olímpico Atahualpa, Quito
Referee: Bruno Pérez (Peru)

23 April 2023
16:30

Paraguay	1–0	Chile
Miño 51'	Report

Estadio Rodrigo Paz Delgado, Quito
Referee: Simone Sozza (Italy)
23 April 2023
16:30

Brazil	3–2	Argentina
Riquelme Fillipi 11'; Dudu 29'; João Pedro 60'	Report	J. Giménez 33'; Echeverri 55'

Estadio Olímpico Atahualpa, Quito
Referee: Felipe González (Chile)
23 April 2023
19:00

Venezuela	1–1	Ecuador
Colina 74'		Páez 46'

Estadio Olímpico Atahualpa, Quito
Referee: Carlos Betancur (Colombia)

== Winners ==
2023 South American U-17 Football champions

Brazil
Thirteenth title

== Goalscorers ==
There were 93 goals scored in 35 matches, for an average of 2.66 goals per match.

5 goals

- (Argentina) Claudio Echeverri
- (Brazil) Kauã Elias
- (Brazil) Rayan

4 goals

- (Ecuador) Michael Bermúdez
- (Paraguay) Rodrigo Villalba
- (Venezuela) David Martínez

3 goals

- (Argentina) Santiago López
- (Argentina) Agustín Ruberto
- (Brazil) Dudu
- (Brazil) João Pedro
- (Ecuador) Keny Arroyo
- (Ecuador) Geremy de Jesús
- (Ecuador) Allen Obando
- (Paraguay) César Miño

2 goals

- (Brazil) Riquelme Fillipi
- (Ecuador) Kendry Páez
- (Paraguay) Paulo Riveros
- (Venezuela) Juan Arango
- (Venezuela) Junior Colina

1 goal

- (Argentina) Valentino Acuña
- (Argentina) Juan Giménez
- (Argentina) Kevin Gutiérrez
- (Bolivia) Braian Mamani
- (Bolivia) Moisés Paniagua
- (Bolivia) Marcelo Torrez
- (Brazil) Lorran
- (Brazil) Luiz Gustavo
- (Brazil) Matheus Reis
- (Brazil) Ricardo
- (Chile) Benjamín Ampuero
- (Chile) Víctor Campos
- (Chile) Alejandro Hales
- (Chile) Benjamín Riquelme
- (Chile) Iván Román
- (Colombia) William López
- (Ecuador) Jairo Reyes
- (Ecuador) Juan Rodríguez
- (Paraguay) Ángel Aguayo
- (Paraguay) Axel Balbuena
- (Paraguay) Jorge Mora
- (Peru) Bassco Soyer
- (Uruguay) Deivis Barone
- (Uruguay) Edison González
- (Venezuela) Mayken González
- (Venezuela) Rai Hidalgo
- (Venezuela) Enmanuel Meléndez
- (Venezuela) Lucciano Reinoso

1 own goal

- (Bolivia) Marcelo Torrez (against Paraguay)
- (Chile) Víctor Campos (against Argentina)
- (Ecuador) Jair Collahuazo (against Brazil)
- (Paraguay) Rodrigo Gómez (against Brazil)

== Qualified teams for FIFA U-17 World Cup ==
The following four teams from CONMEBOL qualified for the 2023 FIFA U-17 World Cup in Indonesia.

Team	Qualified on	Previous appearances in FIFA U-17 World Cup^{1}
Argentina	17 April 2023	14 (1985, 1989, 1991, 1993, 1995, 1997, 2001, 2003, 2007, 2009, 2011, 2013, 2015, 2019)
Brazil	17 April 2023	17 (1985, 1987, 1989, 1991, 1995, **1997**, **1999**, 2001, **2003**, 2005, 2007, 2009, 2011, 2013, 2015, 2017, **2019**)
Ecuador	17 April 2023	5 (1987, 1995, 2011, 2015, 2019)
Venezuela	20 April 2023	1 (2013)

^{1} Bold indicates champions for that year. Italic indicates hosts for that year.
