= César Miño =

Paraguayan footballer (born 2007)

Personal information
- Full name: César Eduardo Miño Amarilla
- Date of birth: 31 May 2007 (age 19)
- Place of birth: Paraguay
- Position: Forward

Team information
- Current team: Club Guaraní
- Number: 18

Youth career
- —2022: Club Guaraní

Senior career*
Years	Team	Apps	(Gls)
2022–	Club Guaraní	42	(3)

International career
2023	Paraguay U17	9	(3)
- * Club domestic league appearances and goals as of 12 August 2025

César Eduardo Miño Amarilla (born 31 May 2007) is a Paraguayan professional footballer who plays for Club Guaraní.

== Club career ==
César Miño made his professional debut for Club Guaraní on the 4 July 2022, replacing Alan Pereira during a 2–0 Primera División Apertura loss to Olimpia. Whilst becoming a regular appearance on the bench during the following Torneo Clausura, he mainly played with the reserve team, where he proved to be a prolific goalscorer.

== International career ==
Miño has been an international player for the Paraguay national under-17 football team. He was part of the team that competed in the Sudamerican Championship, although he was a year younger than most of his teammates.

In his debut in the tournament, he played the last 10 minutes of the first match against Venezuela, which ended in a 1–1 draw. In the second match, he started against Peru and stood out by scoring two goals, securing a 2–0 victory. The team advanced to the final hexagonal with two draws and two victories, but failed to qualify for the FIFA U-17 World Cup.
