= Christian Bravo (footballer, born 2006) =

Chilean footballer

Personal information
- Full name: Christian Mauricio Arturo Bravo Ñanco
- Date of birth: 19 July 2006 (age 20)
- Place of birth: Talcahuano, Chile
- Height: 1.88 m (6 ft 2 in)
- Position: Goalkeeper

Team information
- Current team: Huachipato
- Number: 12

Youth career
- Huachipato

Senior career*
Years	Team	Apps	(Gls)
2025–	Huachipato	20	(0)

International career
2022	Chile U17		
- * Club domestic league appearances and goals as of 11 September 2026

Christian Mauricio Arturo Bravo Ñanco (born 19 July 2006) is a Chilean professional footballer who plays as a goalkeeper for Huachipato.

== Club career ==
A product of Huachipato, Bravo made his professional debut in the 3–2 away loss against Cobresal on 13 September 2025 for the Chilean Primera División. The next season, he became the starting goalkeeper after Sebastián Mella and Rodrigo Odriozola got injured. On 30 August 2026, he was seriously affected by sound bombs in the Liga de Primera match against Coquimbo Unido.

== International career ==
In 2022, Bravo represented Chile at under-17 level.

Bravo received his first call-up to the Chile senior team for the friendly matches against Canada, United States and Mexico in September and October 2026.

== Honours ==
Huachipato

- Copa Chile: 2025
