= Riquelme Fillipi =

Brazilian footballer

Personal information
- Full name: Riquelme Fillipi Marinho de Souza
- Date of birth: 15 September 2006 (age 20)
- Place of birth: Santo André, Brazil
- Height: 1.75 m (5 ft 9 in)
- Position: Winger

Team information
- Current team: Inter Miami
- Number: 11

Youth career
- 2020: Nacional-SP
- 2020: Ibrachina
- 2021–2026: Palmeiras

Senior career*
Years	Team	Apps	(Gls)
2025–2026	Palmeiras	11	(0)
2026–	Inter Miami	5	(1)

International career
2023	Brazil U17	11	(2)
2026–	Brazil U20	2	(0)
- * Club domestic league appearances and goals as of 14 October 2026

Riquelme Fillipi Marinho de Souza (born 15 September 2006), better known as Riquelme or Riquelme Fillipi, is a Brazilian professional footballer who plays as a winger for Inter Miami.

== Club career ==
Groomed at Nacional-SP and Ibrachina, Riquelme arrived at Palmeiras in 2021, initially for the under-15 team. In September 2024, Nottingham Forest submitted a € 6.5 million for his transfer, which was later rejected; he subsequently agreed to a new four-year deal with Palmeiras.

Riquelme made his first team debut on 26 July 2025, coming on as a late substitute for Facundo Torres in a 1–0 home win over Grêmio. In August, he renewed his contract with Palmeiras until January 2029.

== International career ==
For the Brazil under-17 team, Riquelme was part of the winning squad at the South American Championship and the team that reached the quarter-finals of the World Cup in 2023.

== Career statistics ==
As of 20 October 2025

Appearances and goals by club, season and competition
Club	Season	League			Paulista		Copa do Brasil		Continental		Other		Total	
Club	Season	Division	Apps	Goals	Apps	Goals	Apps	Goals	Apps	Goals	Apps	Goals	Apps	Goals
Palmeiras	2025	Série A	1	0	0	0	0	0	0	0	—		1	0
Career total			1	0	0	0	0	0	0	0	0	0	1	0

== Honours ==
Palmeiras U20

- Campeonato Brasileiro Sub-20: 2024, 2025
- Campeonato Paulista Sub-20: 2023

Palmeiras U17

- Campeonato Brasileiro Sub-17: 2022, 2023
- Copa do Brasil Sub-17: 2022, 2023
- Campeonato Paulista Sub-17: 2022

Brazil U17

- South American U-17 Championship: 2023
