= Água Branca, Alagoas =

Municipality of Alagoas, Brazil

Água Branca
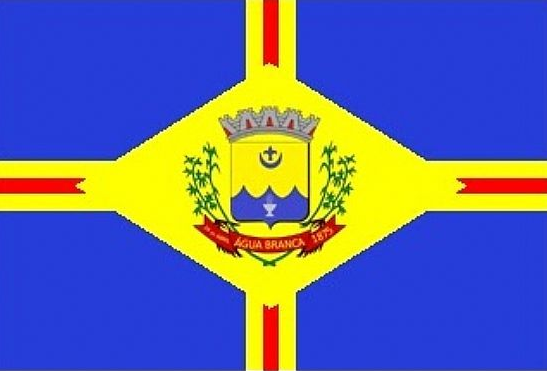
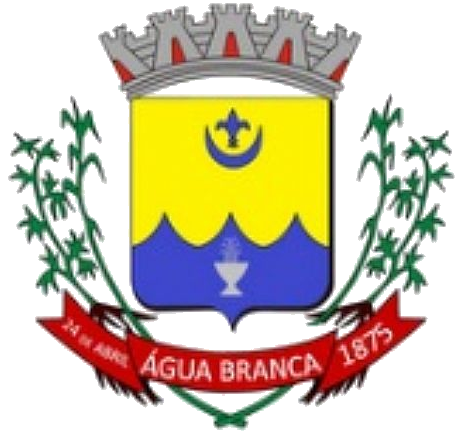
- Flag Coat of arms

- Location in Brazil
- Coordinates: 9°15′39″S 37°56′10″W
- Country: Brazil
- State: Alagoas

Population (2020 est)
  - Total: 20,230
  - Metro density: 110.4/sq mi (42.62/km^{2})
- Time zone: UTC−3 (BRT)

Água Branca (Central northeastern portuguese pronunciation: [ˈaɡ͡wa ˈbɾɐ̃kɐ]) is a municipality located in the western of the state of Alagoas. Its population 20,230 (2020) and its area is 455 km².

== Geography ==
=== Climate ===
Climate data for Água Branca, Alagoas (1981–2010, extremes 1912–present)
Month	Jan	Feb	Mar	Apr	May	Jun	Jul	Aug	Sep	Oct	Nov	Dec	Year
Record high °C (°F)	37.3 (99.1)	35.6 (96.1)	39.1 (102.4)	39.1 (102.4)	38.6 (101.5)	34.6 (94.3)	29.6 (85.3)	30.6 (87.1)	34.0 (93.2)	39.6 (103.3)	36.4 (97.5)	38.1 (100.6)	39.6 (103.3)
Mean daily maximum °C (°F)	30.9 (87.6)	31.1 (88.0)	30.5 (86.9)	29.0 (84.2)	26.9 (80.4)	24.7 (76.5)	24.1 (75.4)	24.9 (76.8)	27.6 (81.7)	30.0 (86.0)	31.2 (88.2)	31.3 (88.3)	28.5 (83.3)
Daily mean °C (°F)	24.8 (76.6)	24.9 (76.8)	24.7 (76.5)	23.9 (75.0)	22.5 (72.5)	20.9 (69.6)	20.2 (68.4)	20.3 (68.5)	21.8 (71.2)	23.5 (74.3)	24.6 (76.3)	24.9 (76.8)	23.1 (73.6)
Mean daily minimum °C (°F)	20.0 (68.0)	20.3 (68.5)	20.5 (68.9)	20.3 (68.5)	19.5 (67.1)	18.4 (65.1)	17.7 (63.9)	17.3 (63.1)	17.8 (64.0)	18.7 (65.7)	19.5 (67.1)	20.1 (68.2)	19.2 (66.6)
Record low °C (°F)	16.0 (60.8)	16.4 (61.5)	11.2 (52.2)	16.5 (61.7)	12.9 (55.2)	14.3 (57.7)	13.0 (55.4)	11.7 (53.1)	13.6 (56.5)	12.0 (53.6)	10.7 (51.3)	16.6 (61.9)	10.7 (51.3)
Average precipitation mm (inches)	39.7 (1.56)	57.0 (2.24)	108.5 (4.27)	85.0 (3.35)	147.9 (5.82)	178.4 (7.02)	164.9 (6.49)	99.8 (3.93)	41.5 (1.63)	29.5 (1.16)	28.4 (1.12)	42.0 (1.65)	1,022.6 (40.26)
Average precipitation days (≥ 1.0 mm)	3	4	7	8	13	17	16	13	6	3	2	3	95
Average relative humidity (%)	72.0	70.6	77.5	83.3	86.8	91.6	91.4	88.0	79.8	74.4	72.8	72.9	80.1
Mean monthly sunshine hours	239.8	221.8	226.7	212.4	181.4	142.1	156.9	187.6	229.0	268.6	263.1	264.9	2,594.3
Source 1: Instituto Nacional de Meteorologia
Source 2: Meteo Climat (record highs and lows)

== See also ==
- List of municipalities in Alagoas
