= Água Branca, Paraíba =

Coordinates: 7°30′43″S 37°38′27″W

- Municipality
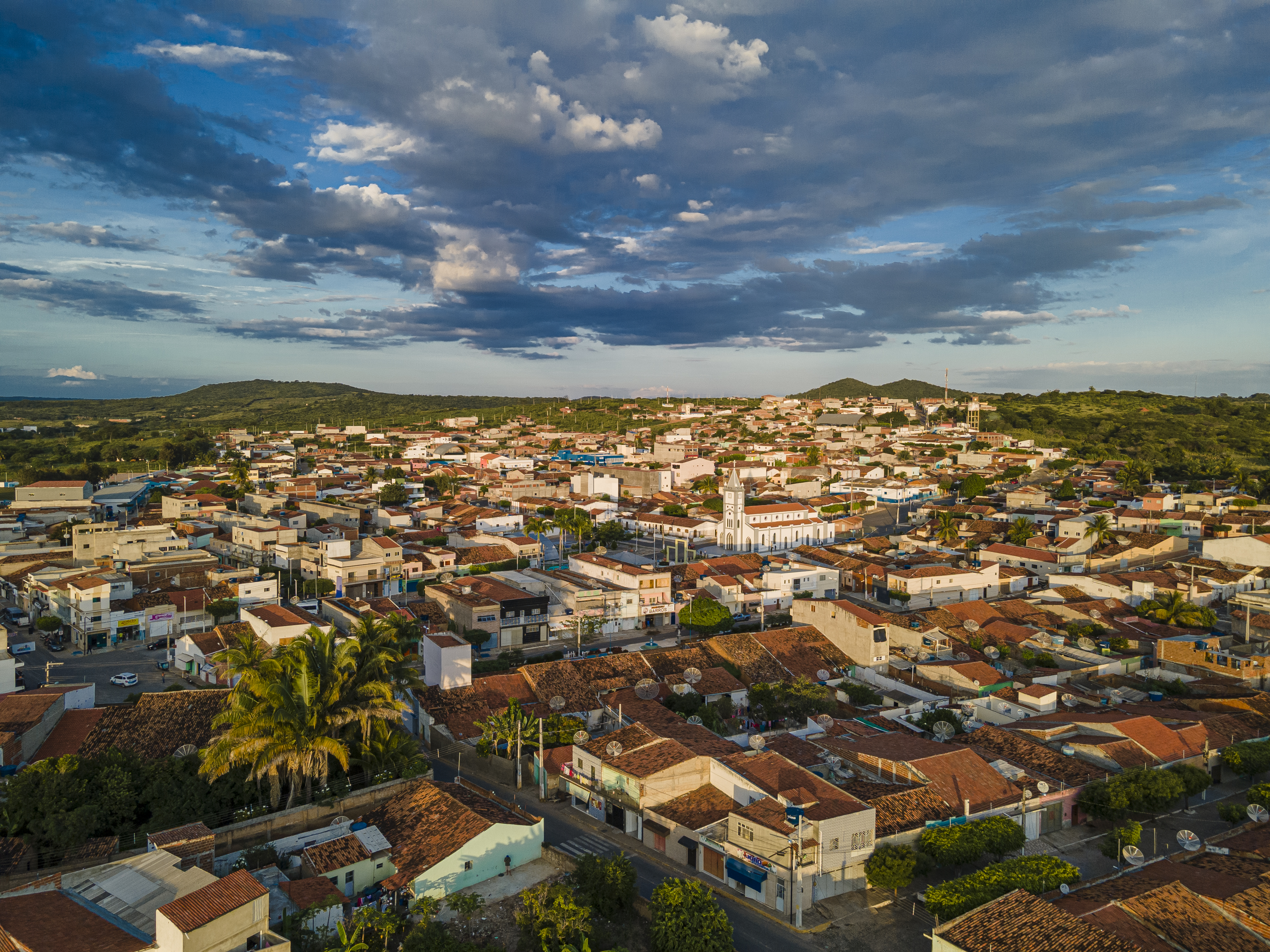

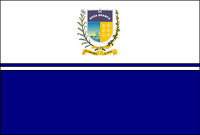
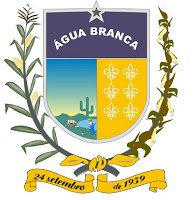
- Flag Coat of arms
- Interactive map of Água Branca, Paraíba
- Country: Brazil
- Region: Northeast
- State: Paraíba
- Mesoregion: Sertao Paraibana

Population (2020)
  - Total: 10,306
- Time zone: UTC−3 (BRT)

Água Branca, Paraíba is a municipality in the state of Paraíba in the Northeast Region of Brazil. It has a population of 10,306, as of 2020.

== See also ==
- List of municipalities in Paraíba
