= Juan Arango =

Venezuelan footballer (born 1980)

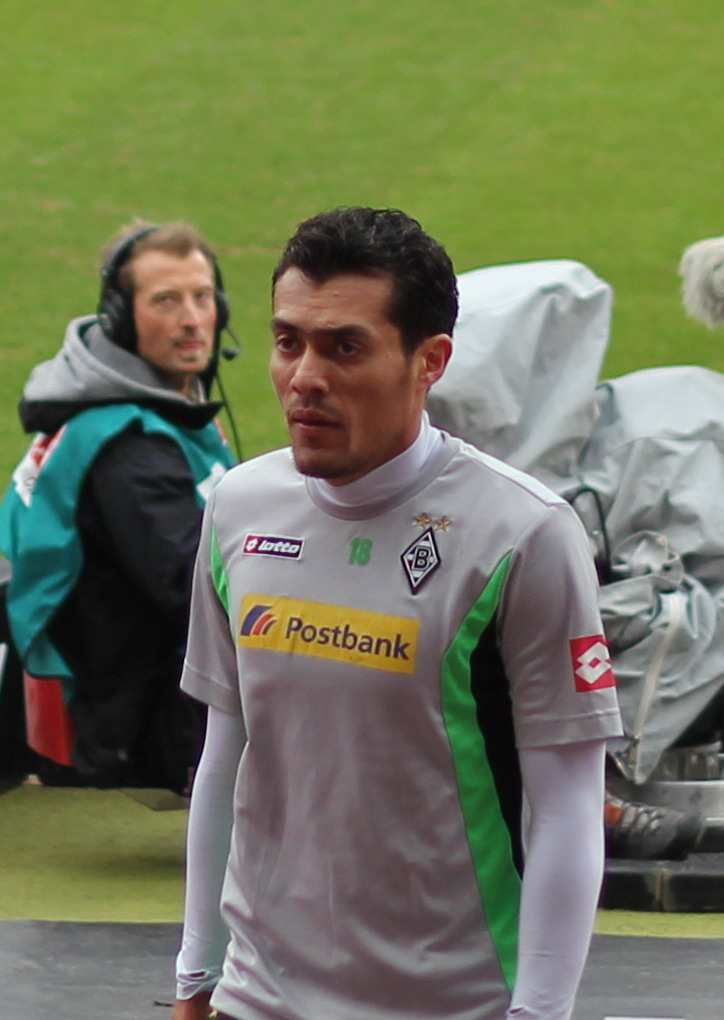
- Arango with Borussia M'gladbach in 2012

Personal information
- Full name: Juan Fernando Arango Sáenz
- Date of birth: 16 May 1980 (age 46)
- Place of birth: Maracay, Venezuela
- Height: 1.80 m (5 ft 11 in)
- Position: Attacking midfielder

Youth career
- 1986–1996: UCV

Senior career*
Years	Team	Apps	(Gls)
1996–1999	Nueva Cádiz		
1999	Zulia	12	(0)
2000	Caracas	19	(5)
2000–2001	Monterrey	45	(6)
2002–2003	Pachuca	52	(16)
2003–2004	Puebla	36	(8)
2004–2009	Mallorca	183	(45)
2009–2014	Borussia Mönchengladbach	154	(25)
2014–2016	Tijuana	45	(11)
2016	New York Cosmos	29	(15)
2017	Zulia	15	(2)
2017	New York Cosmos	3	(0)
Total		593	(133)

International career
1999–2015	Venezuela	129	(22)
- * Club domestic league appearances and goals

Juan Fernando Arango Sáenz (born 16 May 1980) is a Venezuelan former professional footballer who played as an attacking midfielder. Arango was considered by some in the sport as the greatest Venezuelan footballer of all time.

He spent the better part of his professional career in La Liga with Mallorca, appearing in 196 official games, and also played several years with Borussia Mönchengladbach for which he signed at the age of 29.

Arango was Venezuela's record holder in international caps and goals for several years, scoring 22 times in 129 matches between 1999 and 2015. He represented the nation in six Copa América tournaments.

== Club career ==
=== Early years and Mallorca ===
Arango's parents hailed from Colombia, having immigrated to Venezuela before he was born, in the city of Maracay. He started playing as a professional at the age of sixteen with Nueva Cádiz FC, which ascended to the Venezuelan Primera División the following season under the name Zulia FC.

The following year, Arango joined Caracas FC but, after six months playing with the team he was bought by Mexico's C.F. Monterrey. He represented two other clubs in the latter country, C.F. Pachuca and Puebla FC, until 2004, when he joined La Liga side RCD Mallorca in Spain (coached by Benito Floro, also his boss at Monterrey) on a one-year link, with an option for a further three.

On 20 March 2005, Arango suffered a serious injury after a brutal collision with Sevilla FC's Javi Navarro. He fell unconscious, broke his cheekbone, swallowed his tongue and got serious cuts in his face; he returned to play a month later and, in the following season, was the team's top scorer with 11 league goals.

In 2006, EFE chose Arango as the third best Latin American player in the Spanish league, with the first place taken by Pablo Aimar. The following year, he also obtained a Spanish passport, in March. On 9 March 2008, he scored his first hat-trick for Mallorca, in a 7–1 home thrashing of Recreativo de Huelva, with teammate Dani Güiza – who finished as the campaign's Pichichi – adding two; he only missed one league game from 2005 to 2008 combined.

=== Borussia Mönchengladbach ===
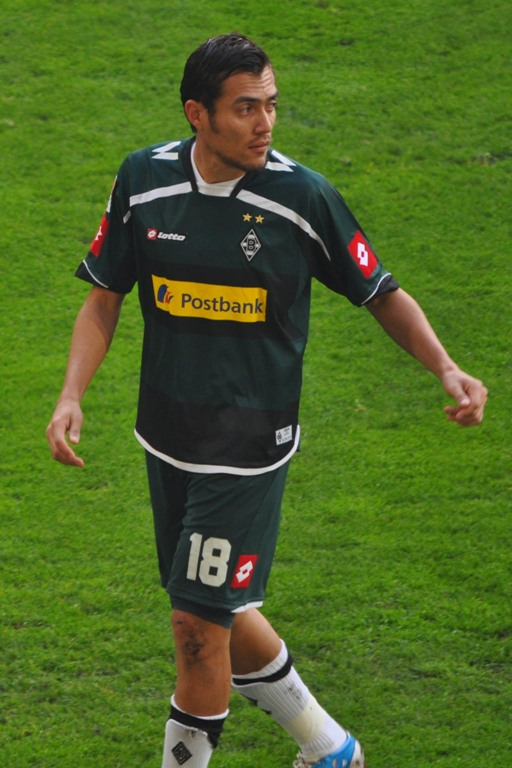
Arango in action in 2010

On 26 June 2009, as his contract was due to expire at the end of 2009–10, Arango was sold to Borussia Mönchengladbach for €3.6 million, penning a three-year contract. In his third season in the Bundesliga he netted six goals in 34 games and also provided 12 assists, as his team finished fourth and qualified for the UEFA Champions League.

On 10 December 2012, Gladbach manager Lucien Favre hailed Arango as one of the best left-footed players in the world, after the Venezuelan scored a 48-yard stunner in a 2–0 defeat of 1. FSV Mainz 05 the previous day. In the following year, he was ranked as the most popular footballer in the world by the International Federation of Football History & Statistics.

Arango scored his first goal of the 2013–14 campaign on 24 August 2013, but in a 2–4 away defeat to Bayer 04 Leverkusen. He also found the net in his team's next league fixture, opening the scoring in a 4–1 home success over SV Werder Bremen.

=== Tijuana ===
Arango returned to Mexico at the age of 34, signing with Club Tijuana on 22 May 2014. In April of the following year, he was handed a two-match ban by the Mexican Football Federation after footage showed him biting Monterrey player Jesús Zavala in an action that eluded the referee.

=== Late career ===
On 28 January 2016, Arango joined the New York Cosmos of the North American Soccer League. Aged 36, he returned to both his country and Zulia one year later.

Arango then had another spell with the Cosmos, leaving in January 2018.

== International career ==
At the 2004 Copa América, Arango appeared in all three group stage matches for Venezuela. In the 2007 edition, held in his country, he helped the national team finish first in the group stage, and scored in the quarterfinals against Uruguay, but in a 4–1 defeat.

Also in that year, Arango was chosen national team captain by newly appointed coach César Farías. In the 2011 Copa América in Argentina, he helped the Vinotinto to a best-ever fourth-place finish in the continental competition, scoring in the third-place match, a 1–4 loss against Peru for what was his 100th cap.

In his 116th international appearance, Arango levelled the record for the most goals scored for Venezuela with 22 goals, scoring in the 56th minute against Bolivia in a 1–1 draw for the 2014 FIFA World Cup qualifiers on 7 June 2013.

== Style of play ==
A left-footed playmaker, who was known for his technical skills, leadership and ability both to score and create goals, courtesy of his striking ability, crossing and passing, Arango was a classic number ten, who was capable of playing both as an attacking midfielder and as a winger. Nicknamed Arangol, he was also a dead ball specialist, who was highly regarded by pundits for his exceptional accuracy from free kicks and his ability to bend the ball.

== Personal life ==
Arango is the son-in law of Argenis Tortolero, brother-in-law of Edson Tortolero, and father of Juan Arango Jr., all of whom were professional footballers.

== Career statistics ==
=== Club ===
Appearances and goals by club, season and competition
Club	Season	League			National cup (Note: Includes Copa del Rey, DFB-Pokal, Copa MX)		Continental		Total	
Club	Season	Division	Apps	Goals	Apps	Goals	Apps	Goals	Apps	Goals
Nueva Cádiz	1999–2000		12	0	—		—		12	0
Caracas	1999–2000		19	5	—		—		19	5
Monterrey	2000–01		30	5	—		—		30	5
Monterrey	2001–02		13	1	—		—		13	1
Monterrey	Total		43	6	—		—		43	6
Pachuca	2001–02	Liga MX	15	5	—		6 (Note: Appearances in CONCACAF Champions Cup)	4	21	9
Pachuca	2002–03	Liga MX	37	11	—		—		37	11
Pachuca	2003–04	Liga MX	36	8	—		—		36	8
Pachuca	Total		88	24	—		6	4	94	28
Mallorca	2004–05	La Liga	34	6	—		—		34	6
Mallorca	2005–06	La Liga	37	11	—		—		37	11
Mallorca	2006–07	La Liga	37	9	3	0	—		40	9
Mallorca	2007–08	La Liga	38	12	5	3	—		43	15
Mallorca	2008–09	La Liga	37	8	4	1	—		41	9
Mallorca	Total		183	45	12	4	—		195	49
Borussia Mönchengladbach	2009–10	Bundesliga	34	2	1	0	—		35	3
Borussia Mönchengladbach	2010–11	Bundesliga	25	4	2	0	—		27	4
Borussia Mönchengladbach	2011–12	Bundesliga	34	6	3	1	—		37	7
Borussia Mönchengladbach	2012–13	Bundesliga	31	5	2	1	8 (Note: Two appearances and one goal in UEFA Champions League, six appearances and two goals in UEFA Europa League)	3	41	9
Borussia Mönchengladbach	2013–14	Bundesliga	30	8	0	0	—		30	8
Borussia Mönchengladbach	Total		154	25	9	3	8	3	171	31
Tijuana	2014–15	Liga MX	24	7	3	1	—		27	8
Career total			523	112	24	8	14	7	561	127

=== International ===
Scores and results list Venezuela's goal tally first, score column indicates score after each Arango goal.

List of international goals scored by Juan Arango
No.	Date	Venue	Opponent	Score	Result	Competition
1	24 April 2001	Pueblo Nuevo, San Cristóbal, Venezuela	Colombia	2–1	2–2	2002 World Cup qualification
2	4 September 2001	Estadio Nacional, Santiago, Chile	Chile	2–0	2–0	2002 World Cup qualification
3	30 April 2003	Pueblo Nuevo, San Cristóbal, Venezuela	Trinidad and Tobago	1–0	3–0	Friendly
4	30 April 2003	Pueblo Nuevo, San Cristóbal, Venezuela	Trinidad and Tobago	2–0	3–0	Friendly
5	7 June 2003	Lockhart Stadium, Fort Lauderdale, United States	Honduras	2–1	2–1	Friendly
6	15 November 2003	Metropolitano Roberto Meléndez, Barranquilla, Colombia	Colombia	1–0	1–0	2006 World Cup qualification
7	18 November 2003	José Pachencho Romero, Maracaibo, Venezuela	Bolivia	2–1	2–1	2006 World Cup qualification
8	19 February 2004	Estadio Olímpico, Caracas, Venezuela	Australia	1–1	1–1	Friendly
9	3 March 2004	Centenario, Montevideo, Uruguay	Uruguay	3–0	3–0	2006 World Cup qualification
10	28 April 2004	Independence Park, Kingston, Jamaica	Jamaica	1–2	1–2	Friendly
11	23 September 2005	José Pachencho Romero, Maracaibo, Venezuela	Peru	2–1	2–1	2006 World Cup qualification
12	24 March 2007	Metropolitano, Mérida, Venezuela	Cuba	1–0	3–1	Friendly
13	7 July 2007	Pueblo Nuevo, San Cristóbal, Venezuela	Uruguay	1–1	1–4	2007 Copa América
14	19 June 2008	Estadio Olímpico, Puerto La Cruz, Venezuela	Chile	2–2	2–3	2010 World Cup qualification
15	15 October 2008	Estadio Olímpico, Puerto La Cruz, Venezuela	Ecuador	3–1	3–1	2010 World Cup qualification
16	31 March 2009	Polideportivo Cachamay, Puerto Ordaz, Venezuela	Colombia	2–0	2–0	2010 World Cup qualification
17	13 October 2010	Olímpico Benito Juárez, Ciudad Juárez, Mexico	Mexico	1–0	2–2	Friendly
18	13 October 2010	Olímpico Benito Juárez, Ciudad Juárez, Mexico	Mexico	2–1	2–2	Friendly
19	23 July 2011	Ciudad de la Plata, La Plata, Argentina	Peru	1–2	1–4	2011 Copa América
20	7 September 2012	Estadio Nacional, Lima, Peru	Peru	1–0	1–2	2014 World Cup qualification
21	16 October 2012	Estadio Olímpico, Puerto La Cruz, Venezuela	Ecuador	1–0	1–1	2014 World Cup qualification
22	7 June 2013	Hernando Siles, La Paz, Bolivia	Bolivia	1–0	1–1	2014 World Cup qualification

== Honours ==
Pachuca

- CONCACAF Champions' Cup: 2002

New York Cosmos

- NASL: 2016

Individual

- CONCACAF Champions' Cup top scorer: 2002
- Bundesliga Team of the Season: 2012–13
- NASL MVP Award: 2016

== See also ==
- List of men's footballers with 100 or more international caps
