= Michael Bermúdez =

Ecuadorian footballer (born 2006)

Personal information
- Full name: Michael Alessandro Bermúdez Reyes
- Date of birth: 13 January 2006 (age 20)
- Place of birth: Santo Domingo, Ecuador
- Position: Forward

Team information
- Current team: Orense (on loan from L.D.U. Quito)
- Number: 19

Youth career
- L.D.U. Quito

Senior career*
Years	Team	Apps	(Gls)
2023–	L.D.U. Quito	0	(0)
2024–2025	→ OFK Beograd (loan)	9	(0)
2025–	→ Orense (loan)	4	(0)

International career^{‡}
2023	Ecuador U17	12	(7)
- * Club domestic league appearances and goals as of 6 January 2025 ‡ National team caps and goals as of 26 July 2024

Michael Alessandro Bermúdez Reyes (born 13 January 2006) is an Ecuadorian footballer who plays as a forward for Ecuadorian club Orense on loan from Ecuadorian Serie A club L.D.U. Quito.

== Club career ==
Following his performances for the Ecuador side at the 2023 South American U-17 Championship, Bermúdez began being linked with the City Football Group, owners of a number of clubs including Manchester City, as well as garnering interest from German side Borussia Dortmund. Despite this interest, he signed his first professional contract, a five-year deal, with Ecuadorian club L.D.U. Quito in October 2023.

In July 2024, Bermúdez joined Serbian club OFK Beograd on loan from Ecuadorian Serie A side L.D.U. Quito.

== International career ==
Bermúdez was called up to the Ecuador under-17 squad for the 2023 South American U-17 Championship, scoring twice in the group stage before completing Ecuador's comeback in an eventual 3–1 win against Paraguay in the final hexagonal, scoring his nation's second goal. He finished the tournament with four goals in eight games, before going on to score five goals in the Copa Mitad del Mundo - a friendly tournament between a number of clubs in South America, and the Ecuador under-17 side.

Bermúdez was called up to the under-17 squad again for the 2023 FIFA U-17 World Cup, and at a pre-tournament press conference, he was questioned about the absence of full Ecuador international Kendry Páez. In response, he stated that the decision was a "matter for the leadership", and that the squad "are very happy for [Páez]" with regards to his meteoric rise.

== Honours ==
International:

Ecuador U17

- FIFA U-17 World Cup: 2023

Club:

LDU Quito

- Ecuadorian Serie A: 2023
- Copa Sudamericana: 2023
- Recopa Sudamericana: 2024 (runner-up)
