= James Brown (BMX rider) =

Canadian BMX rider

Personal information
- Born: 26 June 1989 (age 37) Airdrie, Alberta, Canada

Cycling career
- Sport: Cycling
- Discipline: BMX racing
- Role: Rider

James Brown (born 26 June 1989) is a Canadian male BMX rider, representing his nation at international competitions. He competed in the time trial event at the 2015 UCI BMX World Championships.
