= Bruno Pérez =

Argentine footballer

Personal information
- Full name: Bruno Luciano Pérez Domínguez
- Date of birth: 18 March 2002 (age 24)
- Place of birth: Córdoba, Argentina
- Height: 1.70 m (5 ft 7 in)
- Position: Attacking midfielder

Team information
- Current team: Asteras Tripolis (on loan from Deportivo Madryn)
- Number: 80

Youth career
- Belgrano
- 2019–2020: → Compostela (loan)
- 2021: → Deportes Antofagasta (loan)

Senior career*
Years	Team	Apps	(Gls)
2021–2023	Belgrano	0	(0)
2021–2023	→ Deportes Antofagasta (loan)	27	(1)
2024–	Deportivo Madryn	57	(7)
2026	→ Asteras Tripolis B (loan)	0	(0)
2026–	→ Asteras Tripolis (loan)	3	(0)
- * Club domestic league appearances and goals as of 22:00, 20 September 2026 (UTC)

Bruno Luciano Pérez Domínguez (born 18 March 2002) is an Argentine professional footballer who plays as an attacking midfielder for Super League Greece club Asteras Tripolis, on loan from Deportivo Madryn.

== Career ==
Born in Córdoba, Argentina, Pérez is a product of Belgrano. In 2019–20, he was with Spanish club Compostela, but he finally returned to Argentina in the context of COVID-19 pandemic. The next year, he moved to Chile and joined on loan to Deportes Antofagasta.

As a member of Deportes Antofagasta, Pérez was a substitute in the 4–0 loss against Universidad Católica on 4 November 2021 and made his debut in the Chilean Primera División match against Everton on 21 May 2022. He scored his first goal at professional level in the 4–1 win against San Marcos on 28 May 2023. He ended his loan with them in December 2023.

In January 2024, he returned to his homeland and joined Deportivo Madryn.

On 17 January 2026, Pérez was loaned on Super League Greece club Asteras Tripolis.
