= Sergio Salazar =

Colombian cyclist

Personal information
- Full name: Sergio Ignacio Salazar López
- Born: 23 March 1986 (age 40) Medellín, Colombia
- Height: 1.80 m (5 ft 11 in)
- Weight: 75 kg (165 lb)

Cycling career
- Sport: Cycling
- Current team: GW Shimano
- Discipline: Bicycle motocross (BMX)
- Role: Rider
- Rider type: Off road

Sergio Ignacio Salazar López (born March 23, 1986, in Medellín) is a Colombian professional BMX cyclist. He represented his nation Colombia at the 2008 Summer Olympics, and has claimed multiple Colombian national titles to his career resume in the men's elite category. Salazar currently races and trains professionally for GW Shimano BMX Cycling Team, under his personal coach Jorge Wilson Jaramillo.

Salazar qualified for the Colombian squad, along with Andrés Jiménez and Augusto Castro, in men's BMX cycling at the 2008 Summer Olympics in Beijing by receiving one of the nation's three available berths from the Union Cycliste Internationale based on his top-ten performance in the BMX World Rankings. Salazar started his morning session by grabbing the sixth prelims seed in 36.145 seconds, but he could not match a more stellar ride in his quarterfinal heat with 15 positioning points and a fifth-place finish, narrowly missing out the semifinals by a two-point deficit.
