= Bastián Escobar =

Chilean footballer (born 2006)

Personal information
- Birth name: Bastián Andrés Escobar León
- Date of birth: February 18, 2006 (age 20)
- Place of birth: Victoria, Chile
- Height: 1.72 m (5 ft 8 in)
- Position: Forward

Team information
- Current team: Deportes Concepción
- Number: 39

Senior career*
Years	Team	Apps	(Gls)
2024-2025	Deportes Temuco	25	(1)
2026-present	Deportes Concepción	3	(0)
- * Club domestic league appearances and goals

Bastián Andrés Escobar León (born February 18, 2006) is a Chilean footballer who plays as a striker for Deportes Concepión in Liga de Primera.

== Career ==
Born in Victoria, Chile, in 2006, Escobar came through with the Deportes Temuco junior teams, impressing for them. He made his professional debut for their senior side on February 26, 2024, in a 0–1 win against San Marcos de Arica, coming on as an 85th-minute substitute. He also came off the bench in the side's next two matches, against Deportes Limache and Deportes Magallanes. In the 2025 season, during the third appearance he scored his first professional goal in Deportes Temuco's 2–1 victory over Unión San Felipe. At the end of the season, his contract was not renewed by the Temuco. In February 2026, his signing by Deportes Concepción, of the Liga de Primera, was announced.

== International career ==
He has been called up to the Chilean youth national teams on numerous occasions, making several appearances for the U-17 side. In 2023, he was part of the squad for the 2023 South American U-17 Championship held in Ecuador. In that tournament, the Chilean team was eliminated in the second stage, with Escobar featuring in 8 matches without scoring any goals. In October 2023, he was called up by Nicolás Córdova to participate in a training camp for the U-20 national team.
