= Juan Arango Jr. =

Venezuelan footballer (born 2006)

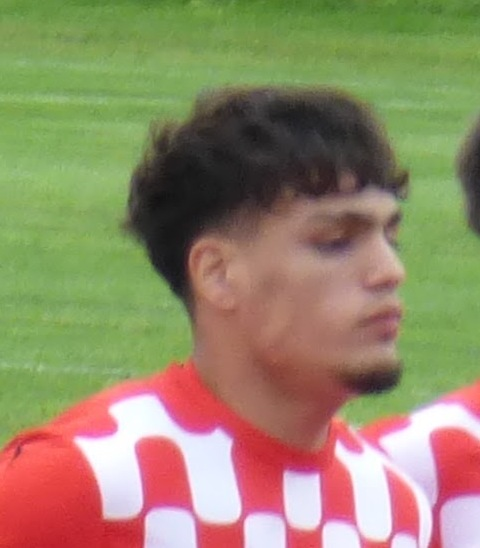
- Arango with Girona in 2024

Personal information
- Full name: Juan Fernando Arango Tortolero
- Date of birth: 27 June 2006 (age 20)
- Place of birth: Calvià, Spain
- Height: 1.75 m (5 ft 9 in)
- Positions: Midfielder; forward

Team information
- Current team: Girona B
- Number: 31

Youth career
- EdF Juan Arango
- Caracas
- 2021–2022: Girona

Senior career*
Years	Team	Apps	(Gls)
2022–	Girona B	39	(7)
2025–	Girona	4	(0)

International career^{‡}
2022–	Venezuela U17	14	(4)
2023–	Venezuela U23	1	(0)
- * Club domestic league appearances and goals as of 25 September 2026 ‡ National team caps and goals as of 22 November 2023

Juan Fernando Arango Tortolero (born 27 June 2006) is a footballer who plays as a midfielder for Spanish side Girona. Born in Spain, he represents Venezuela at youth level.

== Early and personal life ==
Juan Arango Tortolero Jr. was born in Calvià to former Venezuelan international footballer Juan Arango, who at the time was a professional football player for Mallorca. He is the nephew of Edson Tortolero, and the great-grandson of Argenis Tortolero, both of whom also represented Venezuela at international level. His cousin, Edson Tortolero Jr., is also a footballer, and currently plays for Venezuelan side Carabobo.

== Club career ==
Having begun his career at the academy set up by his father, Escuela de Fútbol Juan Arango, Arango played briefly for Caracas, but due to the COVID-19 pandemic in Venezuela, he only managed an appearance apiece for the club's under-15 and under-17 sides. In March 2021, he went on trial with Spanish side Girona, before joining the club at the opening of the summer transfer window in August of the same year.

He signed his first professional contract with the club in August 2022, penning a three-year deal. He marked his debut for Girona's B team with a goal, scoring the club's fourth goal in a 4–2 win against Vilafranca in the Tercera Federación.

== International career ==
Eligible to represent both Spain and Venezuela at international level, Arango chose to follow in the footsteps of his father, stating in an interview with Venezuelan sports newspaper Diario Meridiano that he has "always wanted to represent Venezuela". He was called up to the Venezuela under-17 squad in late 2022, and scored twice in a 4–2 friendly win against Bolivia in December.

Called up to the squad again for the 2023 South American U-17 Championship, he scored twice in eight appearances to help Venezuela to a fourth-place position in the final round. Following his goal against Bolivia in Venezuela's 2–0 win, he stated that he wanted to "create [his] own legacy", and that his father's name was not a burden on his footballing career. After Telasco Segovia had to undergo surgery for an abdominal issue, Arango was drafted into Venezuela's under-23 squad for the 2023 Maurice Revello Tournament, where he went on to make one appearance as Venezuela finished eighth.

== Career statistics ==
=== Club ===
As of 25 September 2026

Appearances and goals by club, season and competition
Club	Season	League			Cup		Other		Total	
Club	Season	Division	Apps	Goals	Apps	Goals	Apps	Goals	Apps	Goals
Girona B	2022–23	Tercera Federación	8	3	–		0	0	8	3
Girona B	2024–25	Tercera Federación	5	0	–		1 (Note: Appearances in Copa Catalunya)	0	6	0
Girona B	2025–26	Tercera Federación	26	4	–		1	0	27	4
Girona B	2026–27	Tercera Federación	4	0	–		–		4	0
Girona B	Total		43	7	–		2	0	44	7
Girona	2025–26	La Liga	2	0	–		–		2	0
Girona	2026–27	Segunda División	2	0	–		–		2	0
Girona	Total		4	0	–		–		4	0
Career total			47	6	0	0	1	0	48	6
