= Água Branca, Piauí =

Coordinates: 5°53′24″S 42°38′16″W

- Municipality
- Country: Brazil
- Region: Nordeste
- State: Piauí
- Mesoregion: Centro-Norte Piauiense

Population (2020)
  - Total: 17,470
- Time zone: UTC−3 (BRT)

Água Branca, Piauí is a municipality in the state of Piauí in the Northeast region of Brazil.

== See also ==
- List of municipalities in Piauí
