= Renato Rezende =

Brazilian cyclist (born 1991)

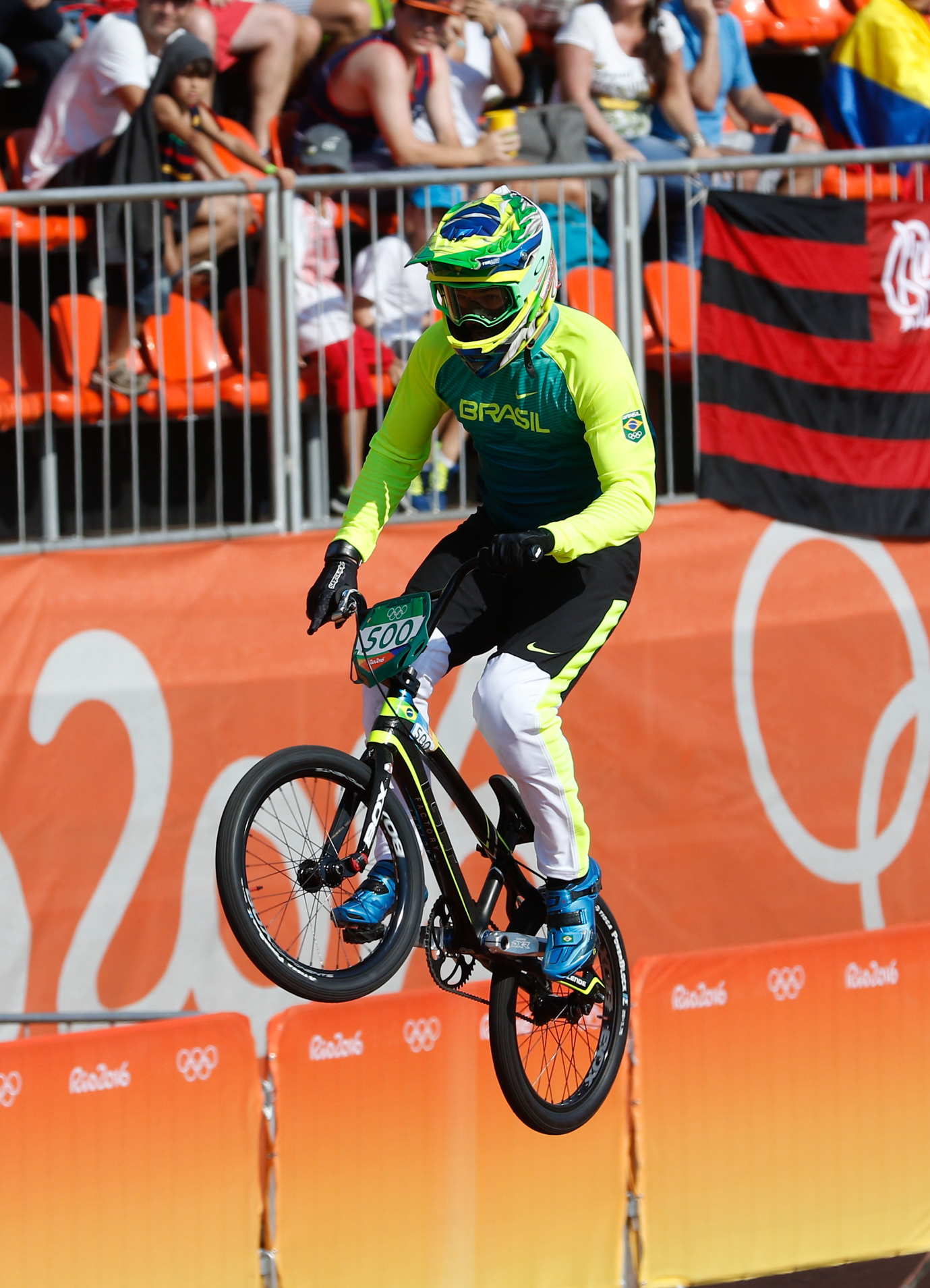
- Rezende at the 2016 Olympics

Personal information
- Full name: Renato Rezende
- Nationality: Brazilian
- Born: 28 February 1991 (age 35) Poços de Caldas, MG

Sport
- Country: Brazil
- Sport: Cycling
- Event: BMX racing
Medal record
Men's BMX racing
Representing Brazil
World Championships
Gold medal – first place	2010 Pietermaritzburg	BMX cruiser
Pan American Championships
Gold medal – first place	2014 Lima	BMX racing
Gold medal – first place	2015 Santiago	BMX racing
South American Games
Gold medal – first place	2014 Santiago	BMX racing
Silver medal – second place	2014 Santiago	BMX time trial
World Junior Championships
Bronze medal – third place	2009 Adelaide	BMX cruiser
Pan American Junior Championships
Bronze medal – third place	2009 Pasto	BMX racing
- Updated on 3 June 2024

Renato Rezende (born 28 February 1991) is a Brazilian racing cyclist who represents Brazil in BMX racing. He represented Brazil at the 2012 Summer Olympics in the men's BMX event.

He represented Brazil at the 2020 Summer Olympics.
