= Jonathan Suárez (BMX rider) =

Venezuelan cyclist

Personal information
- Full name: Jonathan Fernando Suárez Freitez
- Nickname: El Mosquito
- Born: 8 December 1982 (age 43) San Félix, Bolívar, Venezuela
- Height: 1.72 m (5 ft 7 1/2 in)
- Weight: 76 kg (168 lb)

Cycling career
- Sport: Cycling
- Current team: Venezuela
- Discipline: BMX racing
- Role: Rider
Medal record
Men's BMX racing
Representing Venezuela
Event	1st	2nd	3rd
World Championships	1	0	1
Pan American Games	0	1	0
CAC Games	1	0	0
South American Games	0	0	1
Bolivarian Games	1	0	0
Total	3	1	2
World Championships
Gold medal – first place	2007 Victoria	BMX cruiser
Bronze medal – third place	2008 Taiyuan	BMX cruiser
Pan American Games
Silver medal – second place	2007 Rio de Janeiro	BMX racing
Central American and Caribbean Games
Gold medal – first place	2010 Mayagüez	BMX racing
South American Games
Bronze medal – third place	2006 Buenos Aires	BMX cruiser
Bolivarian Games
Gold medal – first place	2009 Sucre	BMX racing

Jonathan Fernando Suárez Freitez (born 8 December 1982, in San Félix, Bolívar) is a Venezuelan professional BMX racing cyclist. Dubbed by his sporting fans as El Mosquito, Suarez has been highly considered a solid, all-around BMX rider in Latin America, and more importantly, one of the world's top cruisers in the sport. He won two men's cruiser medals, including his gold, at the UCI BMX World Championships, and later represented his nation Venezuela at the 2008 Summer Olympics.

Suarez sought headlines on the international scene by edging out Filipino-American rider Daniel Caluag, who previously represented the United States, for a prestigious gold medal in men's cruiser at the 2007 UCI BMX World Championships in Victoria, British Columbia, Canada. He also collected a silver medal to his career hardware in men's BMX cycling at the Pan American Games in Rio de Janeiro on that same year, trailing behind 33-year-old U.S. rider Jason Richardson by less than a second.

Suarez qualified for the Venezuelan squad, as the nation's sole rider, in men's BMX cycling at the 2008 Summer Olympics in Beijing by receiving an automatic berth from the Union Cycliste Internationale based on his top-ten performance from the BMX World Rankings. Suarez started his morning session by grabbing the eighth prelims seed in 36.325 seconds, but he could not match a more stellar ride in his quarterfinal heat with 17 positioning points and a fifth-place finish, narrowly missing out on the semifinals by a six-point deficit.
