= Felipe Faúndez =

Chilean footballer

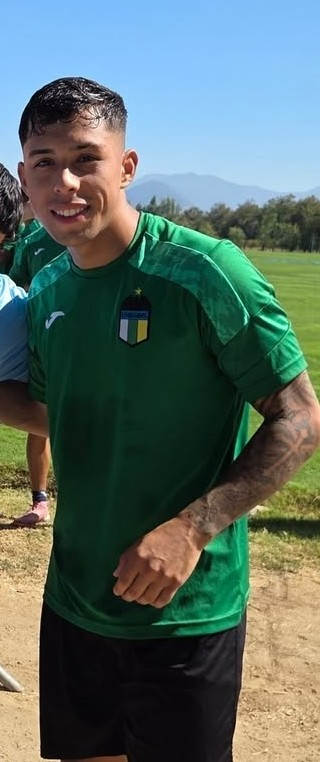
- Faúndez with O'Higgins in 2026.

Personal information
- Full name: Felipe Andrés Faúndez González
- Date of birth: 27 March 2006 (age 20)
- Place of birth: Rengo, Chile
- Height: 1.75 m (5 ft 9 in)
- Position: Right-back

Team information
- Current team: O'Higgins
- Number: 3

Youth career
- Academia Diego Vásquez
- El Esfuerzo
- O'Higgins

Senior career*
Years	Team	Apps	(Gls)
2024–	O'Higgins	48	(1)

International career^{‡}
2022–2023	Chile U17	8	(0)
2024–2025	Chile U20	18	(2)
2026–	Chile	6	(0)
- * Club domestic league appearances and goals as of 27 September 2026 ‡ National team caps and goals as of 29 September 2026

Felipe Andrés Faúndez González (born 27 March 2006) is a Chilean footballer who plays as a right-back for Chilean Primera División side O'Higgins and the Chile national team.

== Club career ==
Born in Rengo, Chile, Faúndez was with Academia Diego Vásquez and Club Deportivo El Esfuerzo before joining the O'Higgins youth ranks. With the under-20's, he took part in the 2023 U20 Copa Libertadores. He made his senior debut in the 1–1 draw against Coquimbo Unido for the Chilean Primera División on 14 September 2024 and signed his first professional contract on 16 October of the same year, becoming a regular player in the 2025 season.

== International career ==
Faúndez represented Chile at under-17 level in friendlies and the 2023 South American U17 Championship, where they reached the fourth place.

Later, Faúndez represented the under-20's in friendlies, the 2025 South American U20 Championship and was included in the final squad for the 2025 FIFA U20 World Cup.

At senior level, Faúndez received his first call-up for the 2026 FIFA Series matches against Cape Verde and New Zealand on 27 and 30 March 2026, respectively. He made his debut in the first match by replacing Iván Román at the minute 46.

== Career statistics ==
=== International ===
As of match played 29 September 2026

Appearances and goals by national team and year
National team	Year	Apps	Goals
Chile	2026	6	0
Total		6	0
