= Andrés Jiménez (BMX rider) =

Colombian cyclist (born 1986)

Personal information
- Full name: Andrés Eduardo Jiménez Caicedo
- Born: 27 August 1986 (age 40) Bogotá, Colombia

Cycling career
- Sport: Cycling
- Current team: Colombia
- Discipline: BMX racing
- Role: Rider
Medal record
Representing Colombia
Men's BMX racing
Event	1st	2nd	3rd
World Championships	0	1	0
World Cup rounds	0	0	1
Pan American Games	0	0	1
Pan American Championships	0	1	0
South American Games	1	0	1
Bolivarian Games	0	0	1
Total	1	2	4
World Championships
Silver medal – second place	2010 Pietermaritzburg	BMX cruiser
Pan American Games
Bronze medal – third place	2011 Gualadajara	BMX racing
Pan American Championships
Silver medal – second place	2012 Santa Cruz de la Sierra	BMX racing
South American Games
Gold medal – first place	2006 Buenos Aires	BMX cruiser
Bronze medal – third place	2010 Medellín	BMX cruiser
Bolivarian Games
Bronze medal – third place	2013 Trujillo	BMX racing

Andrés Eduardo Jiménez Caicedo (born 27 August 1986) is a Colombian racing cyclist who represents Colombia in BMX racing. He represented Colombia at the 2008 Beijing and 2012 Summer Olympics in the men's BMX event. At the 2008 Games, he reached the final but finished just outside the medals. In 2012 he again reached the final, but only finished in 6th place on this occasion.
