= Cristian Becerine =

Argentine professional BMX cyclist

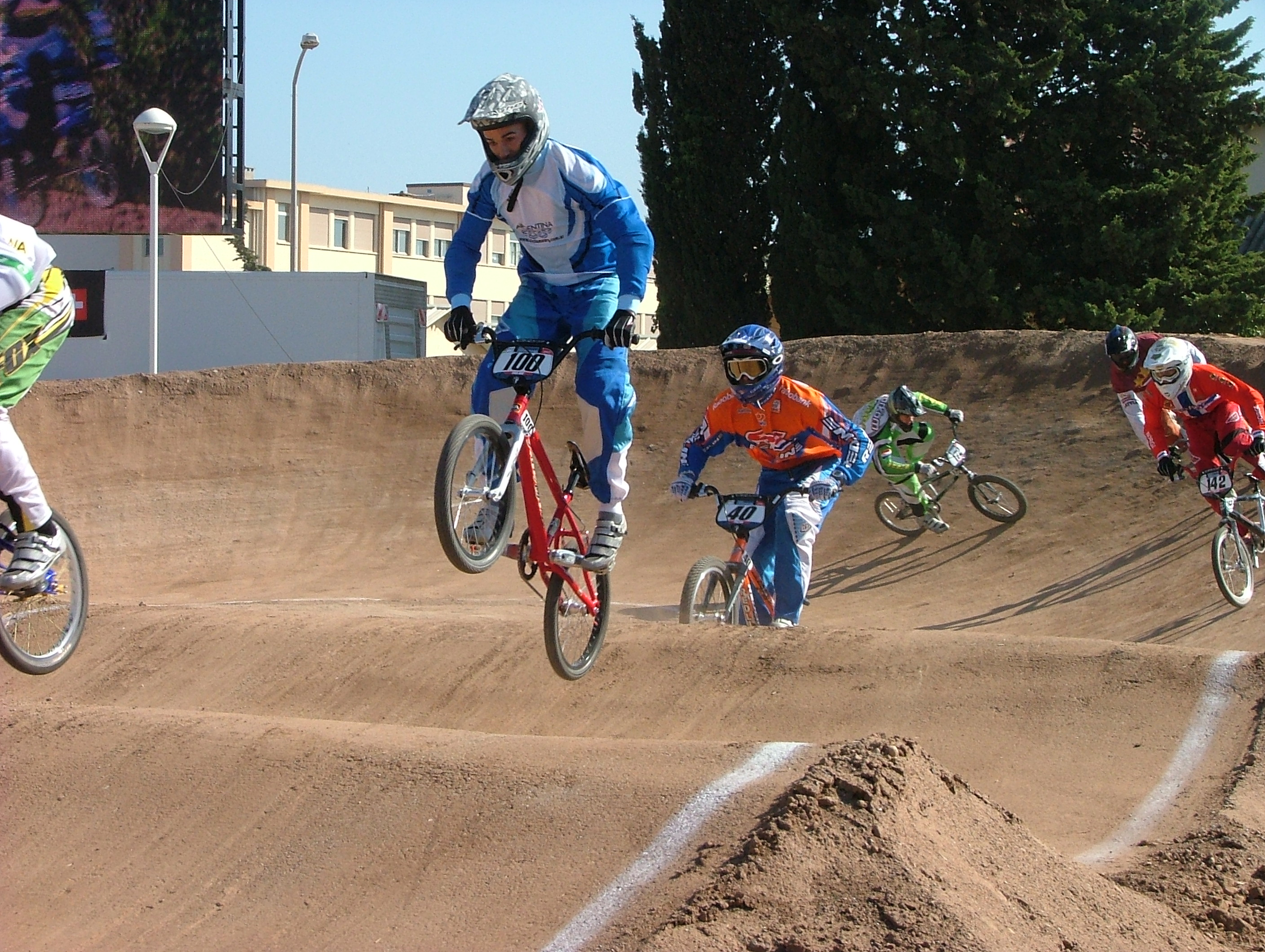

Personal information
- Full name: Cristian Daniel Becerine
- Born: 17 April 1977 (age 49) Comodoro Rivadavia, Chubut, Argentina
- Height: 1.77 m (5 ft 9 1/2 in)
- Weight: 81 kg (179 lb)

Cycling career
- Sport: Cycling
- Current team: Free Agents BMX
- Discipline: Bicycle motocross (BMX)
- Role: Rider
Medal record
Men's BMX racing
Representing Argentina
World Championships
Silver medal – second place	2004 Valkenswaard	BMX racing
World Cup
Bronze medal – third place	2005	BMX racing

Cristian Daniel Becerine (born 17 April 1977 in Comodoro Rivadavia, Chubut) is an Argentine professional BMX cyclist. He is a 2003 American Bicycle Association champion, a ten-time national BMX riding champion, a silver medalist at the 2004 UCI World Championships in Valkenswaard, Netherlands, and a semifinalist in men's BMX at the 2008 Summer Olympics, representing his nation Argentina. Currently residing in Costa Mesa, California, United States, Becerine also raced for the Free Agent BMX Cycling Team, along with his teammate and two-time defending Olympic champion Māris Štrombergs from Latvia, and the late Kyle Bennett. Becerine currently rides for Throdwn and coaches their development team.

Becerine qualified for the Argentine squad in men's BMX cycling at the 2008 Summer Olympics in Beijing by receiving one of the nation's two available berths based on his top-ten performance from the UCI BMX World Rankings. After he grabbed a twenty-seventh seed on the morning prelims with a time of 37.253 and then finished second in the quarterfinals, Becerine scored a total of 15 placing points to mount a fifth spot in his semifinal heat, narrowly missing out the top-eight final by a single token.
