= 2025 FIFA U-20 World Cup =

International youth football championship tournament

Copa Mundial Sub-20 de la FIFA Chile 2025
- Legends in the Making

Tournament details
- Host country: Chile
- Dates: 27 September – 19 October
- Teams: 24 (from 6 confederations)
- Venues: 4 (in 4 host cities)

Final positions
- Champions: Morocco (1st title)
- Runners-up: Argentina
- Third place: Colombia
- Fourth place: France

Tournament statistics
- Matches played: 52
- Goals scored: 149 (2.87 per match)
- Attendance: 585,069 (11,251 per match)
- Top scorer(s): (Colombia) Néiser Villarreal (France) Lucas Michal (Morocco) Yassir Zabiri (United States) Benjamin Cremaschi (5 goals each)
- Best player: (Morocco) Othmane Maamma
- Best goalkeeper: (Argentina) Santino Barbi
- Fair play award: United States

The 2025 FIFA U-20 World Cup was the 24th edition of the FIFA U-20 World Cup, the biennial international men's youth football championship contested by the under-20 national teams of the member associations of FIFA, since its inception in 1977 as the FIFA World Youth Championship. It was held in Chile from 27 September to 19 October 2025.

Reigning champions Uruguay could not defend their title as they finished fifth in the 2025 South American U-20 Championship. In doing so, they became the eighth consecutive title holders to fail to qualify for the subsequent tournament.

Morocco defeated Argentina to win their first FIFA tournament title. This was the fourth consecutive U-20 World Cup to produce a new winning team, dating back to 2017.

== Host selection ==
Chile were announced as the 2025 U-20 World Cup hosts following the FIFA Council meeting on 17 December 2023 in Jeddah, Saudi Arabia. It is believed the decision was made as a compensation for Chile losing hosting rights for the 2030 FIFA World Cup to Morocco, Portugal and Spain, as Chile was the only nation in the four-nation bid of Uruguay, Argentina and Paraguay not included in the eventual outcome for the opening matches.

This was the second time that Chile hosted the tournament, after doing so in 1987. Only Australia (1981, 1993) and Argentina (2001, 2023) had also hosted the tournament multiple times.

== Venues ==
On 18 December 2023, Pablo Milad, president of the Football Federation of Chile, revealed a preliminary list with 12 stadia in 10 cities. Milad also announced that between four and six stadia would be chosen by FIFA for the final tournament.

On 26 May 2025, four Central cities of Santiago, Rancagua, Valparaíso and Talca were announced chosen to host the competition.

Santiago	2025 FIFA U-20 World Cup is located in Chile
Estadio Nacional Julio Martínez Prádanos	2025 FIFA U-20 World Cup is located in Chile
Capacity: 46,190	2025 FIFA U-20 World Cup is located in Chile
Valparaíso	2025 FIFA U-20 World Cup is located in Chile
Estadio Elías Figueroa Brander	2025 FIFA U-20 World Cup is located in Chile
Capacity: 20,575	2025 FIFA U-20 World Cup is located in Chile
Talca	2025 FIFA U-20 World Cup is located in Chile
Estadio Fiscal	2025 FIFA U-20 World Cup is located in Chile
Capacity: 16,070	2025 FIFA U-20 World Cup is located in Chile
Rancagua	2025 FIFA U-20 World Cup is located in Chile
Estadio El Teniente	2025 FIFA U-20 World Cup is located in Chile
Capacity: 12,476	2025 FIFA U-20 World Cup is located in Chile

== Teams ==
=== Qualification ===
Teams qualified Teams failed to qualify Teams withdrew or suspended Did not enter Not a FIFA member

A total of 24 teams qualified for the final tournament. In addition to Chile, who qualified automatically as the hosts, 23 other teams qualified through six separate continental competitions. The slot allocation remained unchanged from the previous editions and was confirmed by the FIFA Council on the same day the host country was announced.

- AFC (Asia): 4
- CAF (Africa): 4
- CONCACAF (North America, Central America and the Caribbean): 4
- CONMEBOL (South America): 5 (including the hosts Chile)
- OFC (Oceania): 2
- UEFA (Europe): 5

New Caledonia made their debut in the tournament. Of the returnees, Morocco made a return after last qualifying in 2005. Australia, Chile, Cuba, Egypt, Paraguay and Spain made a return after last qualifying in 2013. Saudi Arabia, Mexico, Panama, Norway, South Africa and Ukraine made a return from 2019.

Reigning champions Uruguay failed to qualify for the first time since 2005, while Honduras and Senegal failed to qualify after appearing in the previous four consecutive editions. Israel failed to qualify after finishing third in 2023. Dominican Republic, Ecuador, England, Fiji, the Gambia, Guatemala, Iraq, Slovakia, Tunisia, and Uzbekistan failed to qualify after appearing in 2023.

Qualifying tournament	Team	Qualification date	Appearance(s)				Previous best performance
Qualifying tournament	Team	Qualification date	Total	First	Last	Streak	Previous best performance
2025 AFC U-20 Asian Cup	Australia	22 February 2025	16th	1981	2013	1	Fourth place (1991, 1993)
2025 AFC U-20 Asian Cup	Saudi Arabia	22 February 2025	10th	1985	2019	1	Round of 16 (2011, 2017)
2025 AFC U-20 Asian Cup	Japan	23 February 2025	12th	1979	2023	4	Runners-up (1999)
2025 AFC U-20 Asian Cup	South Korea	23 February 2025	17th	1979	2023	4	Runners-up (2019)
2025 U-20 Africa Cup of Nations	Egypt	12 May 2025	9th	1981	2013	1	Third place (2001)
2025 U-20 Africa Cup of Nations	Morocco	12 May 2025	4th	1977	2005	1	Fourth place (2005)
2025 U-20 Africa Cup of Nations	Nigeria	12 May 2025	14th	1983	2023	3	Runners-up (1989, 2005)
2025 U-20 Africa Cup of Nations	South Africa	12 May 2025	5th	1997	2019	1	Round of 16 (2009)
2024 CONCACAF U-20 Championship	Panama	30 July 2024	7th	2003	2019	1	Round of 16 (2019)
2024 CONCACAF U-20 Championship	United States	30 July 2024	18th	1981	2023	6	Fourth place (1989)
2024 CONCACAF U-20 Championship	Cuba	31 July 2024	2nd	2013		1	Group stage (2013)
2024 CONCACAF U-20 Championship	Mexico	31 July 2024	17th	1977	2019	1	Runners-up (1977)
Host nation	Chile	17 December 2023	7th	1987	2013	1	Third place (2007)
2025 South American U-20 Championship	Argentina	10 February 2025	18th	1979	2023	5	Champions (six times) (Note: Argentina have won in 1979, 1995, 1997, 2001, 2005 and 2007.)
2025 South American U-20 Championship	Brazil	10 February 2025	20th	1977	2023	2	Champions (five times) (Note: Brazil have won in 1983, 1985, 1993, 2003 and 2011.)
2025 South American U-20 Championship	Colombia	13 February 2025	12th	1985	2023	3	Third place (2003)
2025 South American U-20 Championship	Paraguay	13 February 2025	10th	1977	2013	1	Fourth place (2001)
2024 OFC U-19 Men's Championship	New Caledonia	15 July 2024	1st	Debut			
2024 OFC U-19 Men's Championship	New Zealand	15 July 2024	8th	2007	2023	7	Round of 16 (2015, 2017, 2019, 2023)
2024 UEFA European Under-19 Championship	Italy	18 July 2024	9th	1977	2023	4	Runners-up (2023)
2024 UEFA European Under-19 Championship	France	19 July 2024	9th	1977	2023	4	Champions (2013)
2024 UEFA European Under-19 Championship	Ukraine	21 July 2024	5th	2001	2019	1	Champions (2019)
2024 UEFA European Under-19 Championship	Spain	22 July 2024	16th	1977	2013	1	Champions (1999)
2024 UEFA European Under-19 Championship	Norway	25 July 2024	4th	1989	2019	1	Group stage (1989, 1993, 2019)

== Squads ==
Players born between 1 January 2005 and 31 December 2009 (inclusive) were eligible to compete in the tournament.

== Draw ==
The draw took place at Chilevisión's Machasa studios in Santiago on 29 May 2025.

The 24 teams were organised into four pots of six teams based on a performance ranking system, in order to be subsequently drawn into six groups of four teams. The hosts Chile were automatically seeded to Pot 1 and assigned into the first position of Group A, while the remaining teams were seeded into pots based on their results in the last five FIFA U-20 World Cups (with more recent tournaments weighted more heavily), and with five bonus points added to each of the six continental champions from the qualifying tournaments, as follows:

Pot	Team	Confederation	2013	2015	2017	2019	2023	Bonus	Total points
Pot	Team	Confederation	Points (20%)	Points (40%)	Points (60%)	Points (80%)	Points (100%)	Bonus	Total points
1	Chile (H)	CONMEBOL	Host nation, automatically assigned to Pot 1						
1	Italy	UEFA	DNQ	DNQ	6.6	10.4	15		32
1	United States	CONCACAF	0.2	4	4.8	7.2	12		28.2
1	South Korea	AFC	1.2	DNQ	3.6	10.4	11		26.2
1	Brazil	CONMEBOL	DNQ	5.6	DNQ	DNQ	9	+5	19.6
1	Colombia	CONMEBOL	1.6	1.6	DNQ	5.6	10		18.8
2	New Zealand	OFC	0	1.6	2.4	5.6	4	+5	18.6
2	France	UEFA	2.8	DNQ	5.4	7.2	3		18.4
2	Ukraine	UEFA	DNQ	3.2	DNQ	15.2	DNQ		18.4
2	Argentina	CONMEBOL	DNQ	0.8	1.8	5.6	9		17.6
2	Nigeria	CAF	1.2	2.4	DNQ	3.2	9		15.8
2	Mexico	CONCACAF	0.6	1.2	4.2	0	DNQ	+5	11
3	Japan	AFC	DNQ	DNQ	2.4	4	3		9.4
3	Spain	UEFA	2.4	DNQ	DNQ	DNQ	DNQ	+5	7.4
3	South Africa	CAF	DNQ	DNQ	0.6	0.8	DNQ	+5	6.4
3	Australia	AFC	0.2	DNQ	DNQ	DNQ	DNQ	+5	5.2
3	Panama	CONCACAF	DNQ	0.4	DNQ	3.2	DNQ		3.6
3	Norway	UEFA	DNQ	DNQ	DNQ	2.4	DNQ		2.4
4
4	Saudi Arabia	AFC	DNQ	DNQ	2.4	0	DNQ		2.4
4	Paraguay	CONMEBOL	1	DNQ	DNQ	DNQ	DNQ		1
4	Egypt	CAF	0.6	DNQ	DNQ	DNQ	DNQ		0.6
4	Cuba	CONCACAF	0	DNQ	DNQ	DNQ	DNQ		0
4	Morocco	CAF	DNQ	DNQ	DNQ	DNQ	DNQ		0
4	New Caledonia	OFC	DNQ	DNQ	DNQ	DNQ	DNQ		0

== Match officials ==
On 23 July 2025, FIFA announced a total of 54 match officials (18 referee and 36 assistant referees) from 22 member associations appointed for the tournament. Football video support (FVS), a simplified alternative to the video assistant referee (VAR), is implemented for the first time at the U-20 World Cup following its success at the 2024 FIFA U-20 and U-17 Women's World Cups.

Confederation	Referees	Assistant referees
AFC	(Saudi Arabia) Khalid Al-Turais	(Saudi Arabia) Mohammed Al-Bakry (Saudi Arabia) Abdulrahim Al-Shammari
AFC	(Malaysia) Nazmi Nasaruddin	(Malaysia) Zairul Khalil Tan (Malaysia) Mohamad Muazi Zainal Abidin
AFC	(Oman) Ahmed Al-Kaf	(Oman) Abu Bakr Al-Amri (Oman) Rashid Al-Ghaiti
CAF	(Algeria) Youcef Gamouh	(Tunisia) Khalil Hassani (Benin) Eric Ayimavo
CAF	(Morocco) Jalal Jayed	(Morocco) Lahsan Azgaou (Morocco) Mostafa Akarkad
CAF	(Somalia) Omar Artan	(Kenya) Gilbert Cheruiyot (São Tomé and Príncipe) Abelmiro Montenegro
CONCACAF	(United States) Joe Dickerson	(United States) Cameron Blanchard (United States) Logan Brown
CONCACAF	(Mexico) Katia Itzel García	(Mexico) Sandra Ramírez (Mexico) Karen Díaz
CONCACAF	(Costa Rica) Keylor Herrera	(Costa Rica) William Chow (Costa Rica) Víctor Ramírez
CONMEBOL	(Ecuador) Augusto Aragón	(Ecuador) Edison Vásquez (Ecuador) Danny Ávila
CONMEBOL	(Argentina) Darío Herrera	(Argentina) Cristian Navarro (Argentina) José Savorani
CONMEBOL	(Colombia) Andrés Rojas	(Colombia) Alexander Guzmán (Colombia) John León
CONMEBOL	(Peru) Kevin Ortega	(Peru) Michael Orué (Peru) Jesús Sánchez
CONMEBOL	(Uruguay) Gustavo Tejera	(Uruguay) Carlos Barreiro (Uruguay) Agustín Berisso
UEFA	(Italy) Maurizio Mariani	(Italy) Daniele Bindoni (Italy) Alberto Tegoni
UEFA	(Bosnia and Herzegovina) Irfan Peljto	(Bosnia and Herzegovina) Senad Ibrisimbegovic (Bosnia and Herzegovina) Davor Beljo
UEFA	(Portugal) João Pinheiro	(Portugal) Bruno Jesus (Portugal) Luciano Maia
UEFA	(Spain) José María Sánchez Martínez	(Spain) Raúl Cabañero (Spain) Íñigo López de Cerain
UEFA	(Switzerland) Sandro Schärer	(Switzerland) Stéphane De Almeida (Switzerland) Jonas Erni

== Group stage ==
The top two teams of each group and the four best third-placed teams advanced to the round of 16.

All times are local, Chile Summer Time (UTC–3).

=== Tiebreakers ===
The rankings of teams in each group were determined as follows (regulations Article 13.1):

1. points obtained among games between tied teams;
2. goal difference among games between tied teams;
3. goals scored among games between tied teams;
4. goal difference in all group matches;
5. goals scored in all group matches;
6. fair play points:
  - first yellow card: –1 point;
  - indirect red card (second yellow card): –3 points;
  - direct red card: –4 points;
  - yellow card and direct red card: –5 points;
7. drawing of lots.

=== Group A ===
Pos	Team	Pld	W	D	L	GF	GA	GD	Pts	Qualification
1	Japan	3	3	0	0	7	0	+7	9	Knockout stage
2	Chile (H)	3	1	0	2	3	5	−2	3 (Note: Teams were tied on head-to-head record (3 points, 0 goal difference, and 3 goals scored), overall record was used. Fair play points: Chile −5, Egypt −7.)	Knockout stage
3	Egypt	3	1	0	2	3	5	−2	3	
4	New Zealand	3	1	0	2	3	6	−3	3	

Source: FIFA
Rules for classification: Group stage tiebreakers
(H) Hosts
Notes:
27 September 2025
17:00

Japan	2–0	Egypt
Ichihara 29' (pen.); Ishii 48'	Report

Estadio Nacional Julio Martínez Prádanos, Santiago
Attendance: 15,051
Referee: Darío Herrera (Argentina)
27 September 2025
20:00

Chile	2–1	New Zealand
Millán 54'; Garguez 90+7'	Report	Walker 85' (pen.)

Estadio Nacional Julio Martínez Prádanos, Santiago
Attendance: 45,547
Referee: Irfan Peljto (Bosnia and Herzegovina)

30 September 2025
17:00

Egypt	1–2	New Zealand
Kabaka 5'	Report	Brooke-Smith 13'; Loke 16'

Estadio Nacional Julio Martínez Prádanos, Santiago
Attendance: 5,991
Referee: Khalid Al-Thurais (Saudi Arabia)
30 September 2025
20:00

Chile	0–2	Japan
	Report	Ichihara 55' (pen.); Yokoyama 82'

Estadio Nacional Julio Martínez Prádanos, Santiago
Attendance: 42,517
Referee: Jalal Jayed (Morocco)

3 October 2025
20:00

Egypt	2–1	Chile
Abdin 47'; Khedr 90+5'	Report	Cárcamo 27'

Estadio Nacional Julio Martínez Prádanos, Santiago
Attendance: 42,072
Referee: Maurizio Mariani (Italy)
3 October 2025
20:00

New Zealand	0–3	Japan
	Report	Ogura 22'; Smith 64' (o.g.); Ishii 82'

Estadio Elías Figueroa Brander, Valparaíso
Attendance: 2,938
Referee: Kevin Ortega (Peru)

=== Group B ===
Pos	Team	Pld	W	D	L	GF	GA	GD	Pts	Qualification
1	Ukraine	3	2	1	0	5	3	+2	7	Knockout stage
2	Paraguay	3	1	1	1	4	4	0	4 (Note: Tied on head-to-head result (South Korea 0–0 Paraguay), overall record was used.)	Knockout stage
3	South Korea	3	1	1	1	3	3	0	4	Knockout stage
4	Panama	3	0	1	2	4	6	−2	1	

Source: FIFA
Rules for classification: Group stage tiebreakers
Notes:
27 September 2025
17:00

South Korea	1–2	Ukraine
Kim Myung-jun 80'	Report	Synchuk 13'; Pyshchur 16'

Estadio Elías Figueroa Brander, Valparaíso
Attendance: 2,552
Referee: Keylor Herrera (Costa Rica)
27 September 2025
20:00

Paraguay	3–2	Panama
Maidana 42'; González 62'; Caballero 90+4'	Report	Krug 5'; G. Herbert 76'

Estadio Elías Figueroa Brander, Valparaíso
Attendance: 2,923
Referee: José María Sánchez Martínez (Spain)

30 September 2025
17:00

Panama	1–1	Ukraine
Herrera 36'	Report	Synchuk 6' (pen.)

Estadio Elías Figueroa Brander, Valparaíso
Attendance: 1,471
Referee: Kevin Ortega (Peru)
30 September 2025
20:00

South Korea	0–0	Paraguay
	Report

Estadio Elías Figueroa Brander, Valparaíso
Attendance: 1,982
Referee: Irfan Peljto (Bosnia and Herzegovina)

3 October 2025
17:00

Panama	1–2	South Korea
Walder 52'	Report	Kim Hyun-min 24'; Shin Min-ha 58'

Estadio Elías Figueroa Brander, Valparaíso
Attendance: 2,160
Referee: Omar Artan (Somalia)
3 October 2025
17:00

Ukraine	2–1	Paraguay
Derkach 46'; Ponomarenko 80'	Report	Miño 69'

Estadio Nacional Julio Martínez Prádanos, Santiago
Attendance: 7,040
Referee: Khalid Al-Turais (Saudi Arabia)

=== Group C ===
Pos	Team	Pld	W	D	L	GF	GA	GD	Pts	Qualification
1	Morocco	3	2	0	1	4	2	+2	6	Knockout stage
2	Mexico	3	1	2	0	5	4	+1	5	Knockout stage
3	Spain	3	1	1	1	3	4	−1	4	Knockout stage
4	Brazil	3	0	1	2	3	5	−2	1	

Source: FIFA
Rules for classification: Group stage tiebreakers
28 September 2025
17:00

Morocco	2–0	Spain
Zabiri 54'; Yassine 58'	Report

Estadio Nacional Julio Martínez Prádanos, Santiago
Attendance: 11,240
Referee: Gustavo Tejera (Uruguay)
28 September 2025
20:00

Brazil	2–2	Mexico
Coutinho 21'; Luighi 76'	Report	Domínguez 10'; D. Ochoa 86'

Estadio Nacional Julio Martínez Prádanos, Santiago
Attendance: 11,828
Referee: Maurizio Mariani (Italy)

1 October 2025
17:00

Spain	2–2	Mexico
García 42'; Bravo 80' (pen.)	Report	Mora 32', 87'

Estadio Nacional Julio Martínez Prádanos, Santiago
Attendance: 5,549
Referee: Darío Herrera (Argentina)
1 October 2025
20:00

Brazil	1–2	Morocco
Iago 90+2' (pen.)	Report	Maamma 60'; Zabiri 76'

Estadio Nacional Julio Martínez Prádanos, Santiago
Attendance: 8,450
Referee: Keylor Herrera (Costa Rica)

4 October 2025
17:00

Spain	1–0	Brazil
Bravo 47'	Report

Estadio Nacional Julio Martínez Prádanos, Santiago
Attendance: 29,497
Referee: Joe Dickerson (United States)
4 October 2025
17:00

Mexico	1–0	Morocco
Mora 51' (pen.)	Report

Estadio Elías Figueroa Brander, Valparaíso
Attendance: 7,003
Referee: Irfan Peljto (Bosnia and Herzegovina)

=== Group D ===
Pos	Team	Pld	W	D	L	GF	GA	GD	Pts	Qualification
1	Argentina	3	3	0	0	8	2	+6	9	Knockout stage
2	Italy	3	1	1	1	3	3	0	4	Knockout stage
3	Australia	3	1	0	2	4	6	−2	3	
4	Cuba	3	0	1	2	4	8	−4	1	

Source: FIFA
Rules for classification: Group stage tiebreakers
28 September 2025
17:00

Italy	1–0	Australia
Mannini 10' (pen.)	Report

Estadio Elías Figueroa Brander, Valparaíso
Attendance: 4,919
Referee: Katia Itzel García (Mexico)
28 September 2025
20:00

Cuba	1–3	Argentina
Pérez 45+4'	Report	Sarco 4', 41'; Subiabre 90'

Estadio Elías Figueroa Brander, Valparaíso
Attendance: 6,020
Referee: Nazmi Nasaruddin (Malaysia)

1 October 2025
17:00

Italy	2–2	Cuba
Natali 14'; Iddrissou 31'	Report	Camejo 70' (pen.), 87' (pen.)

Estadio Elías Figueroa Brander, Valparaíso
Attendance: 2,745
Referee: Augusto Aragón (Ecuador)
1 October 2025
20:00

Argentina	4–1	Australia
Sarco 3'; Pérez 45'; Subiabre 90+3'; Andino 90+5'	Report	Bennie 69'

Estadio Elías Figueroa Brander, Valparaíso
Attendance: 4,498
Referee: Youcef Gamouh (Algeria)

4 October 2025
20:00

Argentina	1–0	Italy
Gorosito 74'	Report

Estadio Elías Figueroa Brander, Valparaíso
Attendance: 11,671
Referee: Keylor Herrera (Costa Rica)
4 October 2025
20:00

Australia	3–1	Cuba
Caputo 20', 50'; Bennie 39'	Report	Raballo 63'

Estadio Nacional Julio Martínez Prádanos, Santiago
Attendance: 2,732
Referee: Jalal Jayed (Morocco)

=== Group E ===
Pos	Team	Pld	W	D	L	GF	GA	GD	Pts	Qualification
1	United States	3	2	0	1	13	3	+10	6 (Note: Tied on head-to-head points (3). Head-to-head goal difference: United States +2, South Africa 0, France −2.)	Knockout stage
2	South Africa	3	2	0	1	8	3	+5	6	Knockout stage
3	France	3	2	0	1	8	4	+4	6	Knockout stage
4	New Caledonia	3	0	0	3	1	20	−19	0	

Source: FIFA
Rules for classification: Group stage tiebreakers
Notes:
29 September 2025
17:00

France	2–1	South Africa
Bermont 25'; Michal 80'	Report	Ah Shene 33' (pen.)

Estadio El Teniente, Rancagua
Attendance: 6,499
Referee: João Pinheiro (Portugal)
29 September 2025
20:00

United States	9–1	New Caledonia
Cremaschi 2', 4', 37'; Tsakiris 7'; Westfield 28'; Norris 35', 44'; Habroune 68'; Campbell 73'	Report	Simane 70'

Estadio El Teniente, Rancagua
Attendance: 2,000
Referee: Omar Artan (Somalia)

2 October 2025
17:00

United States	3–0	France
Gozo 85'; Raines 88'; Zambrano 90+2'	Report

Estadio El Teniente, Rancagua
Attendance: 8,210
Referee: Gustavo Tejera (Uruguay)
2 October 2025
20:00

South Africa	5–0	New Caledonia
Nkwali 25'; April 34' (pen.); Magidigidi 44', 52'; Maku 80'	Report

Estadio El Teniente, Rancagua
Attendance: 1,500
Referee: Nazmi Nasaruddin (Malaysia)

5 October 2025
17:00

South Africa	2–1	United States
Wynder 17' (o.g.); Kekana 45+2'	Report	Cobb 12'

Estadio El Teniente, Rancagua
Attendance: 6,520
Referee: Darío Herrera (Argentina)
5 October 2025
17:00

New Caledonia	0–6	France
	Report	Leborgne 11', 82', 90+3'; Michal 55', 84'; Bernardeau 90+1'

Estadio Fiscal, Talca
Attendance: 9,133
Referee: Augusto Aragón (Ecuador)

=== Group F ===
Pos	Team	Pld	W	D	L	GF	GA	GD	Pts	Qualification
1	Colombia	3	1	2	0	2	1	+1	5 (Note: Tied on head-to-head result (Colombia 0–0 Norway) and overall record. Fair play points: Colombia −4, Norway −5.)	Knockout stage
2	Norway	3	1	2	0	2	1	+1	5	Knockout stage
3	Nigeria	3	1	1	1	4	4	0	4	Knockout stage
4	Saudi Arabia	3	0	1	2	3	5	−2	1	

Source: FIFA
Rules for classification: Group stage tiebreakers
Notes:
29 September 2025
17:00

Norway	1–0	Nigeria
Holten 9' (pen.)	Report

Estadio Fiscal, Talca
Attendance: 5,585
Referee: Joe Dickerson (United States)
29 September 2025
20:00

Colombia	1–0	Saudi Arabia
Perea 64'	Report

Estadio Fiscal, Talca
Attendance: 6,482
Referee: Youcef Gamouh (Algeria)

2 October 2025
17:00

Colombia	0–0	Norway
	Report

Estadio Fiscal, Talca
Attendance: 6,932
Referee: Katia Itzel García (Mexico)
2 October 2025
20:00

Nigeria	3–2	Saudi Arabia
Nasiru 10'; Ochoche 38'; Bameyi 90+4' (pen.)	Report	Al-Yuhaybi 21'; Haji 51'

Estadio Fiscal, Talca
Attendance: 5,063
Referee: João Pinheiro (Portugal)

5 October 2025
20:00

Nigeria	1–1	Colombia
Bameyi 86' (pen.)	Report	González 51'

Estadio Fiscal, Talca
Attendance: 6,172
Referee: Nazmi Nasaruddin (Malaysia)
5 October 2025
20:00

Saudi Arabia	1–1	Norway
Haji 53' (pen.)	Report	Fuglestad 46'

Estadio El Teniente, Rancagua
Attendance: 1,200
Referee: Gustavo Tejera (Uruguay)

=== Ranking of third-placed teams ===
The four best third-placed teams from the six groups advanced to the knockout stage along with the six group winners and six runners-up.

Pos	Grp	Team	Pld	W	D	L	GF	GA	GD	Pts	Qualification
1	E	France	3	2	0	1	8	4	+4	6	Knockout stage
2	F	Nigeria	3	1	1	1	4	4	0	4	Knockout stage
3	B	South Korea	3	1	1	1	3	3	0	4	Knockout stage
4	C	Spain	3	1	1	1	3	4	−1	4	Knockout stage
5	D	Australia	3	1	0	2	4	6	−2	3	
6	A	Egypt	3	1	0	2	3	5	−2	3	

Source: FIFA
Rules for classification: 1) points; 2) goal difference; 3) goals scored; 4) fair play points; 5) drawing of lots.

== Knockout stage ==
In the knockout stage, if a match was level at the end of 90 minutes of normal playing time, extra time was played (two periods of 15 minutes each). If the score was still tied after extra time, the match was decided by a penalty shoot-out.

In the round of 16, the four third-placed teams were matched with the winners of groups A, B, C, and D. The specific match-ups involving the third-placed teams depended on which four third-placed teams qualified for the round of 16:

Third-placed teams qualified from groups						1A vs	1B vs	1C vs	1D vs
A	B	C	D			3C	3D	3A	3B
A	B	C		E		3C	3A	3B	3E
A	B	C			F	3C	3A	3B	3F
A	B		D	E		3D	3A	3B	3E
A	B		D		F	3D	3A	3B	3F
A	B			E	F	3E	3A	3B	3F
A		C	D	E		3C	3D	3A	3E
A		C	D		F	3C	3D	3A	3F
A		C		E	F	3C	3A	3F	3E
A			D	E	F	3D	3A	3F	3E
	B	C	D	E		3C	3D	3B	3E
	B	C	D		F	3C	3D	3B	3F
	B	C		E	F	3E	3C	3B	3F
	B		D	E	F	3E	3D	3B	3F
		C	D	E	F	3C	3D	3F	3E

=== Bracket ===
Round of 16
7 October – Valparaíso
Chile	1
Mexico	4
8 October – Santiago
Argentina	4
Nigeria	0
7 October – Valparaíso
Ukraine	0
Spain	1
8 October – Talca
Colombia	3
South Africa	1
9 October – Rancagua
United States	3
Italy	0
9 October – Rancagua
Morocco	2
South Korea	1
8 October – Talca
Paraguay	0
Norway (a.e.t.)	1
8 October – Santiago
Japan	0
France (a.e.t.)	1

Quarter-finals
11 October – Santiago
Mexico	0
Argentina	2
11 October – Talca
Spain	2
Colombia	3
12 October – Rancagua
United States	1
Morocco	3
12 October – Valparaíso
Norway	1
France	2

Semi-finals
15 October – Santiago
Argentina	1
Colombia	0
15 October – Valparaíso
Morocco (p)	1 (5)
France	1 (4)

Final
19 October – Santiago
Argentina	0
Morocco	2
Third place play-off
18 October – Santiago
Colombia	1
France	0

=== Round of 16 ===
7 October 2025
16:30

Ukraine	0–1	Spain
	Report	García 24'

Estadio Elías Figueroa Brander, Valparaíso
Attendance: 5,345
Referee: Jalal Jayed (Morocco)

7 October 2025
20:00

Chile	1–4	Mexico
Rossel 88'	Report	Jiménez 26'; Fimbres 67'; Camberos 80', 86'

Estadio Elías Figueroa Brander, Valparaíso
Attendance: 18,118
Referee: João Pinheiro (Portugal)

8 October 2025
16:30

Argentina	4–0	Nigeria
Sarco 2'; Carrizo 23', 53'; Silvetti 66'	Report

Estadio Nacional Julio Martínez Prádanos, Santiago
Attendance: 5,746
Referee: Maurizio Mariani (Italy)

8 October 2025
16:30

Colombia	3–1	South Africa
Canchimbo 7'; Villarreal 63', 90+6'	Report	Vilakazi 49' (pen.)

Estadio Fiscal, Talca
Attendance: 6,420
Referee: Khalid Al-Turais (Saudi Arabia)

8 October 2025
20:00

Paraguay	0–1 (a.e.t.)	Norway
	Report	Fuglestad 116'

Estadio Fiscal, Talca
Attendance: 7,368
Referee: Keylor Herrera (Costa Rica)

8 October 2025
20:00

Japan	0–1 (a.e.t.)	France
	Report	Michal 120+3' (pen.)

Estadio Nacional Julio Martínez Prádanos, Santiago
Attendance: 12,405
Referee: Katia Itzel García (Mexico)

9 October 2025
16:30

United States	3–0	Italy
Cremaschi 15', 90+3'; Tsakiris 79'	Report

Estadio El Teniente, Rancagua
Attendance: 6,598
Referee: Gustavo Tejera (Uruguay)

9 October 2025
20:00

Morocco	2–1	South Korea
Shin Min-ha 8' (o.g.); Zabiri 58'	Report	Kim Tae-won 90+6' (pen.)

Estadio El Teniente, Rancagua
Attendance: 8,375
Referee: Darío Herrera (Argentina)

=== Quarter-finals ===
11 October 2025
17:00

Spain	2–3	Colombia
Belaid 56'; Virgili 59'	Report	Villarreal 38', 64', 89'

Estadio Fiscal, Talca
Attendance: 10,326
Referee: Joe Dickerson (United States)

11 October 2025
20:00

Mexico	0–2	Argentina
	Report	Carrizo 9'; Silvetti 56'

Estadio Nacional Julio Martínez Prádanos, Santiago
Attendance: 25,232
Referee: Jalal Jayed (Morocco)

12 October 2025
17:00

United States	1–3	Morocco
Campbell 45+6' (pen.)	Report	Zahouani 31'; Wynder 67' (o.g.); Yassine 87'

Estadio El Teniente, Rancagua
Attendance: 10,742
Referee: Kevin Ortega (Peru)

12 October 2025
20:00

Norway	1–2	France
Holten 83'	Report	Bouabré 19', 37'

Estadio Elías Figueroa Brander, Valparaíso
Attendance: 7,742
Referee: Irfan Peljto (Bosnia and Herzegovina)

=== Semi-finals ===
15 October 2025
17:00

Morocco	1–1 (a.e.t.)	France
Olmeta 32' (o.g.)	Report	Michal 59'
Penalties
El Bahraoui (penalty scored); Boumassaoudi (penalty scored); Zabiri (penalty scored); Hamony (penalty missed); El Haddad (penalty scored); Byar (penalty scored)	5–4	(penalty scored) Michal; (penalty missed) Beyuku; (penalty scored) Zidane; (penalty scored) Bernardeau; (penalty scored) Dabo; (penalty missed) N'Guessan

Estadio Elías Figueroa Brander, Valparaíso
Attendance: 11,300
Referee: Gustavo Tejera (Uruguay)

15 October 2025
20:00

Argentina	1–0	Colombia
Silvetti 72'	Report

Estadio Nacional Julio Martínez Prádanos, Santiago
Attendance: 41,354
Referee: João Pinheiro (Portugal)

=== Third place play-off ===
18 October 2025
16:00

Colombia	1–0	France
Perea 2'	Report

Estadio Nacional Julio Martínez Prádanos, Santiago
Attendance: 21,053
Referee: Omar Artan (Somalia)

=== Final ===
19 October 2025
20:00

Argentina	0–2	Morocco
	Report	Zabiri 12', 29'

Estadio Nacional Julio Martínez Prádanos, Santiago
Attendance: 43,253
Referee: Maurizio Mariani (Italy)

== Awards ==
The following awards were given at the conclusion of the tournament. They were all sponsored by Adidas, except for the FIFA Fair Play Trophy.

Golden Ball	Silver Ball	Bronze Ball
(Morocco) Othmane Maamma	(Morocco) Yassir Zabiri	(Argentina) Milton Delgado
Golden Boot	Silver Boot	Bronze Boot
(United States) Benjamin Cremaschi (5 goals, 2 assists)	(Colombia) Néiser Villarreal (5 goals, 1 assist)	(France) Lucas Michal (5 goals, 0 assists, 511 minutes played)
Golden Glove
(Argentina) Santino Barbi
FIFA Fair Play Trophy
United States

== Goalscorers ==
There were 149 goals scored in 52 matches, for an average of 2.87 goals per match.

5 goals

- (Colombia) Néiser Villarreal
- (France) Lucas Michal
- (Morocco) Yassir Zabiri
- (United States) Benjamin Cremaschi

4 goals

- (Argentina) Alejo Sarco

3 goals

- (Argentina) Maher Carrizo
- (Argentina) Mateo Silvetti
- (France) Andréa Leborgne
- (Mexico) Gilberto Mora

2 goals

- (Argentina) Ian Subiabre
- (Australia) Daniel Bennie
- (Australia) Max Caputo
- (Colombia) Óscar Perea
- (Cuba) Michael Camejo
- (France) Saïmon Bouabré
- (Japan) Rion Ichihara
- (Japan) Hisatsugu Ishii
- (Mexico) Hugo Camberos
- (Morocco) Gessime Yassine
- (Nigeria) Daniel Bameyi
- (Norway) Niklas Fuglestad
- (Norway) Rasmus Holten
- (South Africa) Siviwe Magidigidi
- (Saudi Arabia) Talal Haji
- (Spain) Iker Bravo
- (Spain) Pablo García
- (Ukraine) Hennadiy Synchuk
- (United States) Cole Campbell
- (United States) Nolan Norris
- (United States) Niko Tsakiris

1 goal

- (Argentina) Santino Andino
- (Argentina) Dylan Gorosito
- (Argentina) Tomás Pérez
- (Brazil) Rafael Coutinho
- (Brazil) Iago
- (Brazil) Luighi
- (Chile) Javier Cárcamo
- (Chile) Ian Garguez
- (Chile) Lautaro Millán
- (Chile) Juan Rossel
- (Colombia) Joel Canchimbo
- (Colombia) Kener González
- (Cuba) Karel Pérez
- (Cuba) Alessio Raballo
- (Egypt) Ahmed Abdin
- (Egypt) Ahmed Kabaka
- (Egypt) Omar Khedr
- (Spain) Rayane Belaid
- (Spain) Jan Virgili
- (France) Anthony Bermont
- (France) Gabin Bernardeau
- (Italy) Jamal Iddrissou
- (Italy) Mattia Mannini
- (Italy) Andrea Natali
- (Japan) Kosei Ogura
- (Japan) Yumeki Yokoyama
- (Mexico) Tahiel Jiménez
- (Mexico) Iker Fimbres
- (Mexico) Alexéi Domínguez
- (Mexico) Diego Ochoa
- (Morocco) Othmane Maamma
- (Morocco) Fouad Zahouani
- (New Caledonia) Antoine Simane
- (New Zealand) Luke Brooke-Smith
- (New Zealand) Xuan Loke
- (New Zealand) Nathan Walker
- (Nigeria) Salihu Nasiru
- (Nigeria) Amos Ochoche
- (Panama) Giovany Herbert
- (Panama) Gustavo Herrera
- (Panama) Martín Krug
- (Panama) Kevin Walder
- (Paraguay) Tiago Caballero
- (Paraguay) Enso González
- (Paraguay) César Miño
- (Paraguay) Alexandro Maidana
- (Saudi Arabia) Amar Al-Yuhaybi
- (South Africa) Jody Ah Shene
- (South Africa) Shakeel April
- (South Africa) Gomolemo Kekana
- (South Africa) Lazola Maku
- (South Africa) Siviwe Nkwali
- (South Africa) Mfundo Vilakazi
- (South Korea) Kim Hyun-min
- (South Korea) Kim Myung-jun
- (South Korea) Kim Tae-won
- (South Korea) Shin Min-ha
- (Ukraine) Maksym Derkach
- (Ukraine) Matviy Ponomarenko
- (Ukraine) Oleksandr Pyshchur
- (United States) Noah Cobb
- (United States) Zavier Gozo
- (United States) Taha Habroune
- (United States) Brooklyn Raines
- (United States) Francis Westfield
- (United States) Marcos Zambrano

1 own goal

- (France) Lisandru Olmeta (against Morocco)
- (New Zealand) Jayden Smith (against Japan)
- (South Korea) Shin Min-ha (against Morocco)

2 own goals

- (United States) Joshua Wynder (against Morocco and South Africa)

Source: FIFA

== Marketing ==
=== Emblem ===
The Emblem was revealed on 5 February 2025. It drew inspiration from Chile's unique geography and heritage. The design prominently featured elements such as the Andes Mountains, the Pacific Ocean, and the vibrant colors of Chilean culture, reflecting the nation's deep love for football. The emblem was expected to resonate with both local fans and the global football community.

=== Theme song ===
One day before the tournament began, FIFA revealed the official song titled "El Alma en la Cancha (Olé Olé Olé)" (Spanish for "The Soul on the Pitch") sung by Shirel and produced by Taffy Dönicke.

=== Mascot ===
The mascot was revealed on 22 May 2025. His name was Vito, a viscacha characteristic of the region. Considered sociable, charming, and energetic, this animal resembled a rabbit or chinchilla.

== See also ==
- 2025 FIFA U-17 World Cup
- 2025 FIFA U-17 Women's World Cup
