= Alexandro Maidana =

Paraguayan footballer (born 2005)

Personal information
- Full name: Alexandro Maidana Mendieta
- Date of birth: 26 July 2005 (age 21)
- Place of birth: Caacupé, Paraguay
- Height: 1.78 m (5 ft 10 in)
- Position: Left-back

Team information
- Current team: Talleres
- Number: 3

Youth career
- Guaraní

Senior career*
Years	Team	Apps	(Gls)
2023–2026	Guaraní	29	(3)
2023	→ Atyrá (loan)	23	(2)
2024	→ Resistencia (loan)	24	(4)
2026–	Talleres	18	(3)

International career^{‡}
2025	Paraguay U20	4	(0)
2026–	Paraguay	6	(1)
- * Club domestic league appearances and goals as of 15 November 2026 ‡ National team caps and goals as of 15 November 2026

Alexandro Maidana Mendieta (born 26 July 2005) is a Paraguayan professional football player who plays as a left-back for Argentine Primera División club Talleres, and the Paraguay national team.

== Club career ==
A youth product of Guaraní, Maidana began his senior career in 2023 on loan with Atyrá in the Paraguayan División Intermedia. The following season, he went on loan with Resistencia in the same division. In 2025, he returned to Guaraní and played for their senior team in the Paraguayan Primera División. On 27 February 2026, he transferred to the Argentine Primera División club Talleres on a long-term contract.

== International career ==
Maidana was part of the Paraguay U20s at the 2025 FIFA U-20 World Cup. He was called up to the senior Paraguay national team for a set of friendlies in March 2026. He debuted in a friendly 1–0 win over Greece on 26 March 2026.

On 1 June 2026, he was named by head coach Gustavo Alfaro in Paraguay's 26-man squad for the 2026 FIFA World Cup.

== Career statistics ==
=== International ===
As of match played 13 November 2026

Appearances and goals by national team and year
National team	Year	Apps	Goals
Paraguay	2026	6	1
Total		6	1

Scores and results list Paraguay's goal tally first.

List of international goals scored by Alexandro Maidana
No.	Date	Venue	Cap	Opponent	Score	Result	Competition
1	5 June 2026	Estadio Defensores del Chaco, Asunción, Paraguay	2	Nicaragua	4–0	4–0	Friendly
