= Santino Barbi =

Argentina footballer (born 2005)

Personal information
- Date of birth: 14 June 2005 (age 21)
- Place of birth: Córdoba, Argentina
- Height: 1.91 m (6 ft 3 in)
- Position: Goalkeeper

Team information
- Current team: Talleres
- Number: 1

Youth career
- 2021–: Talleres

Senior career*
Years	Team	Apps	(Gls)
2024–	Talleres II	32	(0)

International career^{‡}
2024–	Argentina U20	15	(0)
Medal record
Men's football
Representing Argentina
FIFA U-20 World Cup
Runner-up	2025 Chile
- * Club domestic league appearances and goals as of 13:59, 20 October 2025 (UTC) ‡ National team caps and goals as of 13:59, 20 October 2025 (UTC)

Santino Barbi (born 14 June 2005) is an Argentine footballer who plays as a goalkeeper for Argentine Primera División club Talleres. He is also the starting goalkeeper for the Argentina U-20 national team. In the 2025 FIFA U-20 World Cup, he won the Golden Glove, making him the most valuable goalkeeper of the tournament.

== Club career ==
Barbi joined Talleres in 2021 at the age of 15. At 18, he began training with the first team and promptly signed a contract with the club until 2027. In 2024, he was awarded the "Premio Estímulo" by La Voz del Interior, which recognizes outstanding figures in Córdoba sports.

== International career ==
Throughout 2024, Barbi was frequently called up to the Argentina U20 team. He was the starting goalkeeper in their runner-up campaign at the Alcudia International U-20 Football Tournament. In November, he was again selected by coach Javier Mascherano for a series of friendly matches.

In 2025, the goalkeeper participated in the FIFA U-20 World Cup, where his standout performances helped lead his country to the final. Argentina ultimately lost 2–0 to Morocco. Despite the defeat, Barbi was named the best goalkeeper of the tournament.

== Honours ==
Argentina U20

- FIFA U-20 World Cup runner-up: 2025

Individual

- FIFA U-20 World Cup Golden Glove: 2025
