= Paraguay national football team =

Men's association football team

Paraguay
- Nickname(s): La Albirroja (The White and Red)
- Association: Asociación Paraguaya de Fútbol (APF)
- Confederation: CONMEBOL (South America)
- Head coach: Gustavo Alfaro
- Captain: Gustavo Gómez
- Most caps: Paulo da Silva (148)
- Top scorer: Roque Santa Cruz (32)
- Home stadium: Estadio Defensores del Chaco
- FIFA code: PAR
First colours	Second colours

FIFA ranking
- Current: 31 ▲2 (18 November 2026)
- Highest: 8 (March 2001)
- Lowest: 103 (May 1995)

First international
- Paraguay 1–5 Argentina (Asunción, Paraguay; 11 May 1919)

Biggest win
- Paraguay 7–0 Bolivia (Rio de Janeiro, Brazil; 30 April 1949); Hong Kong 0–7 Paraguay (Hong Kong; 17 November 2010)

Biggest defeat
- Argentina 8–0 Paraguay (Santiago, Chile; 20 October 1926)

World Cup
- Appearances: 9 (first in 1930)
- Best result: Quarter-finals (2010)

Copa América
- Appearances: 39 (first in 1921)
- Best result: Champions (1953, 1979)

The Paraguay national football team (Spanish: Selección de fútbol de Paraguay; Guarani: Poravo Paraguáigua Vakapipopo pegua), nicknamed La Albirroja, represents Paraguay in men's international football competitions, and are controlled by the Paraguayan Football Association. Paraguay is a member of CONMEBOL.

The team has qualified for nine FIFA World Cup competitions (1930, 1950, 1958, 1986, 1998, 2002, 2006, 2010, 2026), with their best performance coming in 2010 when they reached the quarter-finals. A regular participant at the Copa América, Paraguay have been crowned champions of the competition on two occasions (in 1953 and 1979). Paraguay's highest FIFA World Ranking was 8th in March 2001 and their lowest was 103rd in May 1995. Paraguay was awarded second place with Best Move of the Year in 1996 for their rise in the FIFA World Ranking.

The national team's most successful period was under the coaching of Argentine Gerardo Martino, who was awarded with the South American Coach of the Year in 2007 and took Paraguay to the quarter-finals stage of the FIFA World Cup competition for the first time in history (in 2010) and also to the final of the 2011 Copa América, where Paraguay finished as runners-up. In Paraguay's entire history at the FIFA World Cup, only Carlos Gamarra and José Luis Chilavert hold the distinction of being selected as part of the All-Star Team, for their performances in the 1998 edition. Paulo da Silva holds the most appearances for the national team with 148 matches and Roque Santa Cruz is the all-time leading goalscorer with 32 goals. Denis Caniza, who was part of the national team from 1996 to 2010, is the only player to have represented Paraguay in four consecutive FIFA World Cup competitions (1998, 2002, 2006, 2010).

== History ==
=== The beginning (1900–1930) ===
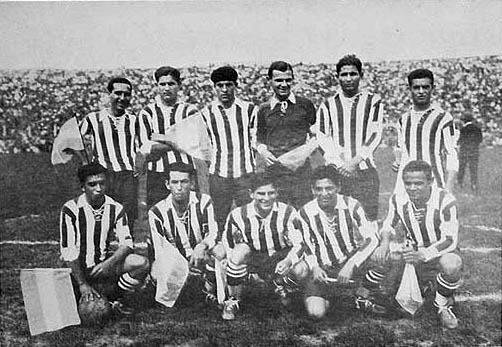
Paraguay at the 1929 South American Championship

Soon after the introduction of football in Paraguay by Williams Paats, the Liga Paraguaya de Fútbol (today Asociación Paraguaya de Fútbol) was created in 1906. The first national football team was organized in 1910 when an invitation by the Argentine club Hércules of Corrientes was received to play a friendly match that ended in a 0–0 draw.

Because of the increasing number of invitations to play matches and international tournaments, the Asociación Paraguaya de Fútbol decided to officially create the national team and select the striped red and white jerseys that, to this day, remain as the official colours (taken from the Paraguayan flag). In late 1919, Paraguay accepted an invitation to play the 1921 South American Championship; in order to prepare for that event, a number of friendly matches were played between 1919 and 1921. The first of those friendly matches was a 5–1 loss against Argentina, the first international match played by Paraguay. When the 1921 South American Championship began, Paraguay defeated three-time South American champions Uruguay 2–1, with this being the first match in an official competition for the Paraguayan football team. Paraguay eventually finished fourth in the tournament and became a regular participant of the tournament for the next editions.

=== First taste of success (1930–1970) ===
In 1930, Paraguay participated in the first World Cup, organized by Uruguay. In the first round, Paraguay lost to the United States 0–3, before defeating Belgium 1–0 with a goal by Luis Vargas Peña. Only one team per group advanced from the first round, and the U.S. left Paraguay behind.

After participating in the 1929, 1947 and 1949 South American Championships (where Paraguay finished in second place), Paraguay returned to the World Cup in 1950, facing Sweden and Italy in Group 3. Paraguay failed to advance to the next round after a 2–2 draw against Sweden and a 2–0 loss against Italy. Paraguay won their first South American Championship in 1953, played in Peru, after winning against Chile (3–0), Bolivia (2–1) and Brazil (2–1), and drawing Ecuador (0–0), Peru (2–2) and Uruguay (2–2). Since Paraguay and Brazil were tied in points at the end of the tournament, a final playoff match was played between them, with Paraguay winning the final 3–2.

For the 1958 World Cup, Paraguay qualified ahead of Uruguay (beating them 5–0 in the decisive game) with a team that contained a formidable attacking lineup with stars such as Juan Bautista Agüero, José Parodi, Jorge Lino Romero, Cayetano Ré and Florencio Amarilla. In their first game in Sweden, Paraguay were 3–2 up against France in a game they lost 7–3. A 3–2 win over Scotland and a 3–3 draw with Yugoslavia saw Paraguay finish third in their group.

The departure of several of their stars for European football (mainly Spain) resulted in a weakening of Paraguay's football fortunes somewhat, but they were only edged out by Mexico in the 1962 qualifiers.

=== More continental success (1970–1990) ===
With players such as Romerito, Carlos Alberto Kiese, Alicio Solalinde, Roberto Paredes, Hugo Ricardo Talavera and Eugenio Morel and manager Ranulfo Miranda, Paraguay won the 1979 Copa América after finishing first in Group C (which consisted of Uruguay and Ecuador as well) with two wins and two draws. In the semi-finals, Paraguay defeated Brazil by an aggregate score of 4–3. In the final, Paraguay defeated Chile by an aggregate score of 3–1 to claim its second continental crown.

Paraguay ended a 28-year absence from the World Cup in 1986; during their time in Mexico, the team defeated Iraq 1–0, and drew the hosts 1–1 and Belgium 2–2. They reached the second round where they were beaten 3–0 by England.

=== The golden generation (1998–2011) ===
A drought followed once again, as Paraguay failed to reach the 1990 and 1994 World Cups.

In 1992, Paraguay won the South American pre-Olympic tournament, which guaranteed a spot in the 1992 Summer Olympics football competition. In the Olympics, Paraguay finished second in its group and were eliminated by Ghana in the quarter-finals. Despite this, new players such as Carlos Gamarra, Celso Ayala, José Luis Chilavert, Francisco Arce and José Cardozo emerged, becoming part of the "golden generation" that led Paraguay to three straight World Cups and noteworthy performances in continental competitions.

==== 1998 FIFA World Cup ====
Paraguay concluded the qualifiers for the 1998 World Cup by finishing second, one point below Argentina.

Pos	Team	Pld	W	D	L	GF	GA	GD	Pts	Qualification
1	Nigeria	3	2	0	1	5	5	0	6	Advance to knockout stage
2	Paraguay	3	1	2	0	3	1	+2	5	Advance to knockout stage
3	Spain	3	1	1	1	8	4	+4	4	
4	Bulgaria	3	0	1	2	1	7	−6	1	

Source: FIFA

Coached by the Brazilian Paulo César Carpegiani, the Albirroja returned to the World Cup finals for the first time since 1986. Paraguay were drawn into Group D, alongside Bulgaria, Nigeria and Spain. Paraguay drew their first two matches 0–0, against Bulgaria and Spain. Nigeria, who had already qualified for the second round after winning their first two matches, lost 3–1 to Paraguay, who finished second in the group.

Paraguay met hosts France (without Zinedine Zidane) in the round of 16 on 28 June, with a goalless 90 minutes. In the 114th minute of extra-time, Laurent Blanc scored to eliminate Paraguay with a golden goal. Defender Carlos Gamarra and goalkeeper and captain José Luís Chilavert were selected as part of the 1998 All-Star Team.

==== 1999 and 2001 Copa América ====
Group A
Team	Pld	W	D	L	GF	GA	GD	Pts
Paraguay (H)	3	2	1	0	5	0	+5	7
Peru	3	2	0	1	4	3	+1	6
Bolivia	3	0	2	1	1	2	−1	2
Japan	3	0	1	2	3	8	−5	1

(H) Hosts

Paraguay were hosts of the 1999 Copa América, played in four cities throughout the country. Many of the 1998 World Cup players returned, to be coached by Ever Hugo Almeida. Grouped with Bolivia, Japan and Peru, the Albirroja played their first match of the competition, drawing 0–0 against Bolivia. On 2 July, Paraguay faced Japan and sealed a 4–0 victory. In Paraguay's third and last group stage fixture against Peru, Paraguay won 1–0. The Albirroja topped the group with seven points. Paraguay were drawn against Uruguay at the quarter-final stage. The match was decided via a penalty shootout, which saw Paraguay lose 5–3. Following the conclusion of the competition, striker Roque Santa Cruz was awarded with the 1999 Paraguayan Footballer of the Year award.

In the 2001 Copa América, head coach Sergio Markarián selected a squad of mostly domestic based players. Paraguay were drawn against Peru, Mexico and Brazil. Their 12 July match against Peru ended 3–3. On 15 July, Paraguay drew 0–0 with Mexico, before Brazil's 3–1 win three days later in Paraguay's last group stage fixture.

==== 2002 FIFA World Cup ====
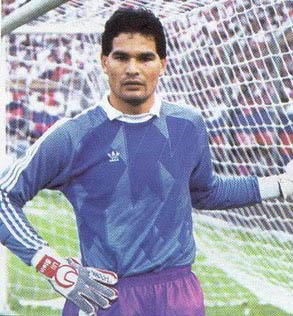
José Luis Chilavert was a key figure during the qualifiers as Paraguay qualified for Korea-Japan 2002.

Paraguay placed fourth in the 2002 World Cup qualifying process, qualifying for the tournament.

Pos	Team	Pld	W	D	L	GF	GA	GD	Pts	Qualification
1	Spain	3	3	0	0	9	4	+5	9	Advance to knockout stage
2	Paraguay	3	1	1	1	6	6	0	4	Advance to knockout stage
3	South Africa	3	1	1	1	5	5	0	4	
4	Slovenia	3	0	0	3	2	7	−5	0	

Source: FIFA
Rules for classification: Tie-breaking criteria

Cesare Maldini being appointed as coach in January 2002 caused controversy as domestic managers were overlooked (prompting the managers union to try to unsuccessfully expel him for immigration breaches). They were in Group B with Spain, South Africa and Slovenia. The Albirroja would face South Africa in their opening group stage match on 2 June, with a match that ended in a 2–2 draw, before Spain defeated Paraguay 3–1 on 7 June. In the third group stage fixture against Slovenia, Paraguay won 3–1. Although Paraguay and South Africa had finished with four points each with a goal difference of 0, the Albirroja progressed due to having scored six goals while South Africa scored five. Paraguay then faced Germany, who dominated the match, scoring in the 88th minute on their way to the final.

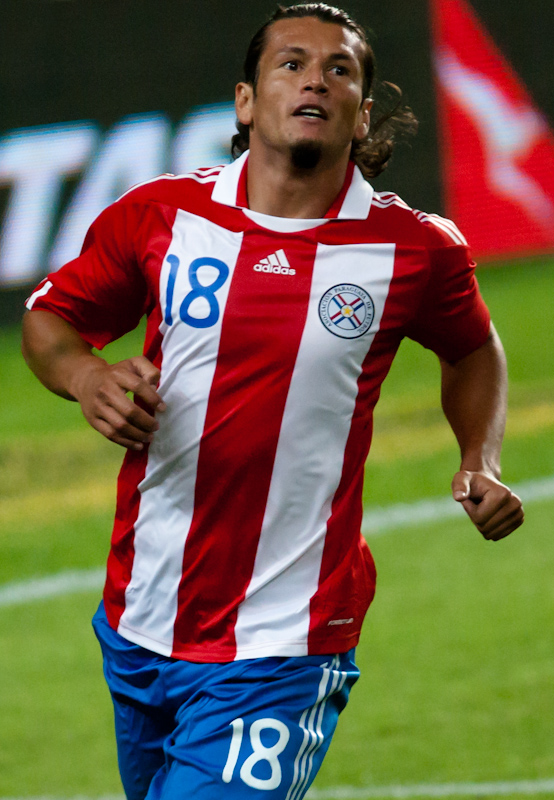
Nelson Valdez played at the 2004 Copa América.

==== 2004 Copa América ====
Coach Carlos Jara Saguier took a relatively young squad to the 2004 Copa América, with the majority of players tied to clubs of the Primera División Paraguaya. Having been drawn in Group C with Brazil, Costa Rica and Chile, a penalty sealed Paraguay's 1–0 victory in their first group stage match against Costa Rica. Paraguay then drew 1–1 with Chile, then earned a 2–1 victory against Brazil, finishing undefeated in their group with seven points. Paraguay were drawn against Uruguay in the quarter-finals, being eliminated after losing 3–1.

==== 2006 FIFA World Cup ====
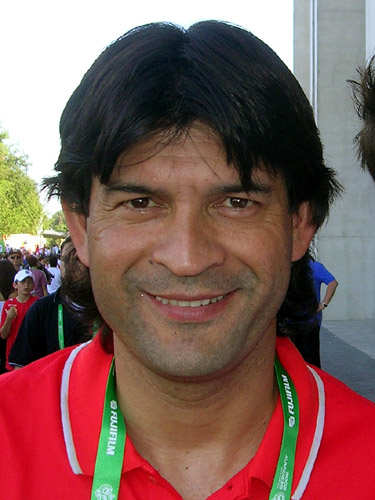
José Saturnino Cardozo scored seven goals during the 2006 World Cup qualifiers.

Paraguay began the 2006 World Cup qualifying campaign in 2003, completing the process by finishing fourth two years later, qualifying for their third consecutive World Cup.

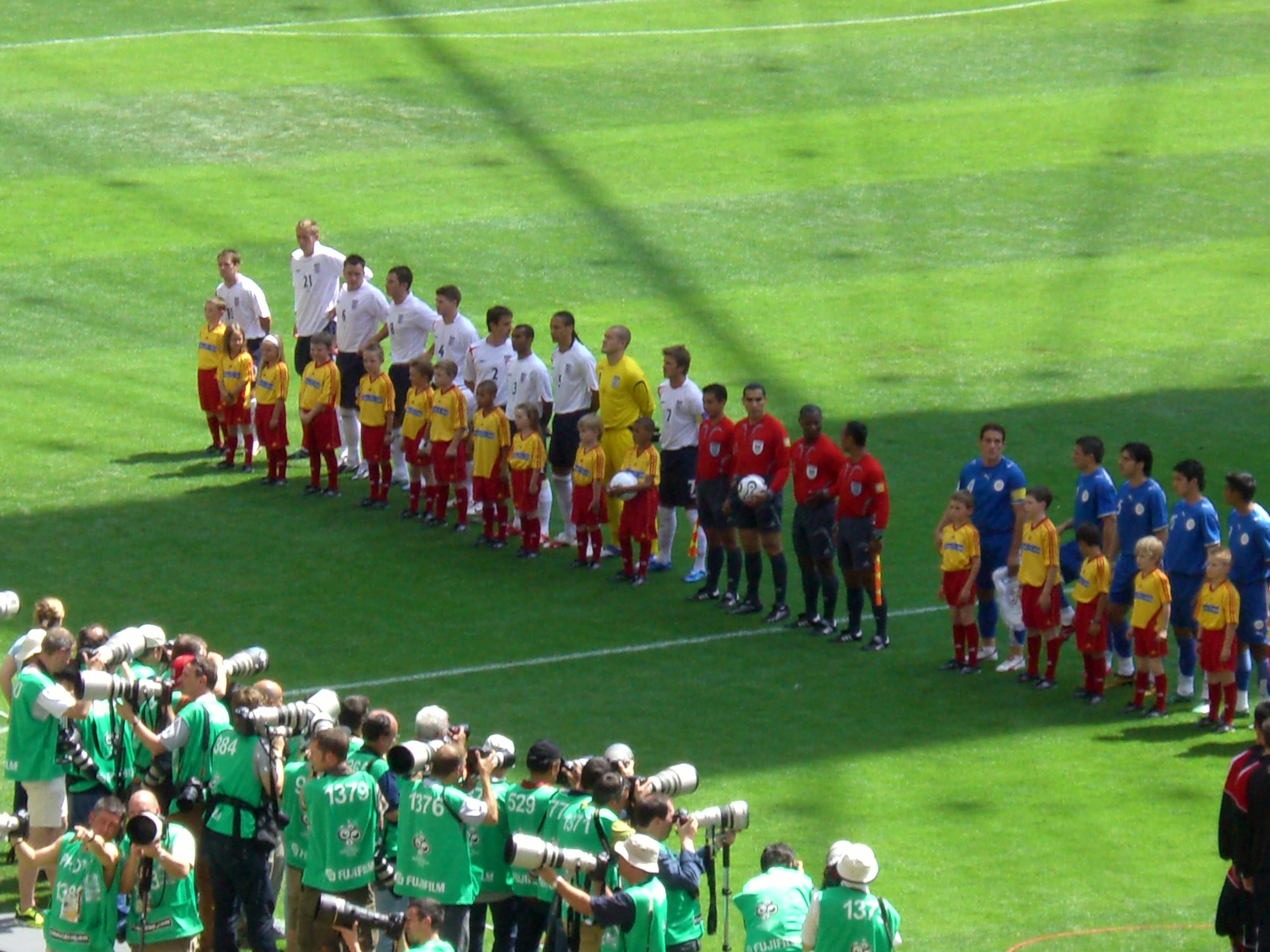
Paraguay (right, in blue) against England (left, in white) before their match at the 2006 FIFA World Cup

Pos	Team	Pld	W	D	L	GF	GA	GD	Pts	Qualification
1	England	3	2	1	0	5	2	+3	7	Advance to knockout stage
2	Sweden	3	1	2	0	3	2	+1	5	Advance to knockout stage
3	Paraguay	3	1	0	2	2	2	0	3	
4	Trinidad and Tobago	3	0	1	2	0	4	−4	1	

Source: FIFA
Rules for classification: Tie-breaking criteria

The team was drawn into Group B alongside England, Sweden and Trinidad and Tobago. Paraguay faced England in their opening group stage match on 10 June, with the Three Lions winning 1–0. Paraguay failed to score against Sweden on 15 June, and were eliminated after just two group stage matches, with their only compensation being a 2–0 win against Trinidad and Tobago. Paraguay finished third in their group, and were the only South American team that did not advance past the first round. Upon the conclusion of Paraguay's 2006 FIFA World Cup campaign, Aníbal Ruiz resigned as head coach and Raúl Vicente Amarilla was assigned as the interim coach.

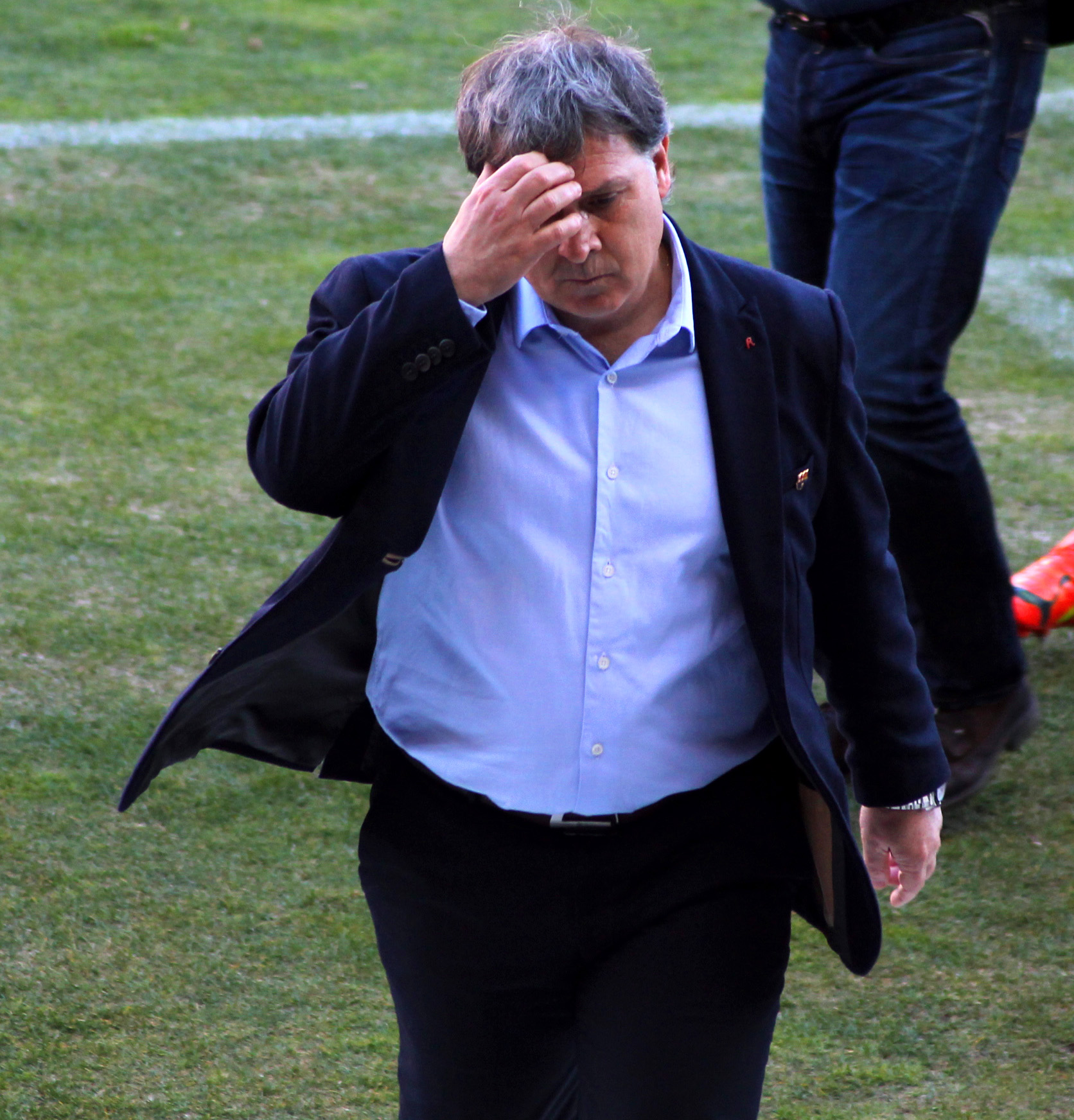
Gerardo Martino became the new coach as of January 2007.

==== 2007 Copa América ====
Group C
Team	Pld	W	D	L	GF	GA	GD	Pts
Argentina	3	3	0	0	9	3	+6	9
Paraguay	3	2	0	1	8	2	+6	6
Colombia	3	1	0	2	3	9	−6	3
United States	3	0	0	3	2	8	−6	0

Group C included Paraguay, Argentina, Colombia, and the United States. In Paraguay's first fixture, they would defeat Colombia 5–0 after a hat-trick from Roque Santa Cruz and a double from Salvador Cabañas. In Paraguay's second fixture against the United States, Édgar Barreto opened the scoring in the 29th minute just before the USA's Ricardo Clark equalized in the 35th minute. Paraguay would win the match 3–1 after a goal from Óscar Cardozo and a 92nd minute free kick from Salvador Cabañas.

With both Paraguay and Argentina having obtained six points and qualifying from Group C, the two teams faced in their last group stage fixture with a second-string team. A 79th minute Javier Mascherano goal was enough to seal a 1–0 victory for Argentina, as Paraguay advanced to the knockout stages to face Mexico. Mexico had already beaten Brazil in the group stage and had finished in first place in Group B. After Paraguayan goalkeeper Aldo Bobadilla was sent off in the third minute, Paraguay conceded a penalty in the fifth minute and eventually found themselves down 3–0 at half-time. Mexico would score another three more goals, thrashing Paraguay 6–0 and ending their Copa América campaign.

==== 2010 FIFA World Cup ====
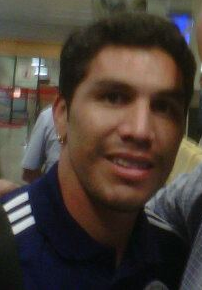
Coach Gerardo Martino regarded Salvador Cabañas as the Albirroja's best player, Martino also considered Cabañas as Paraguay's Lionel Messi.

Paraguay commenced their 2010 World Cup qualifying campaign with a 0–0 away draw against Peru. They followed this draw with four consecutive wins — against Urugauay (1–0), Ecuador (5–1), Chile (3–0), and Brazil (2–0) — to take the team to first place in the CONMEBOL standings after four matches, staying there for nine consecutive rounds. Paraguay lost for the first time in qualifying in a 4–2 away defeat against Bolivia. They eventually concluded qualifying with 33 points.

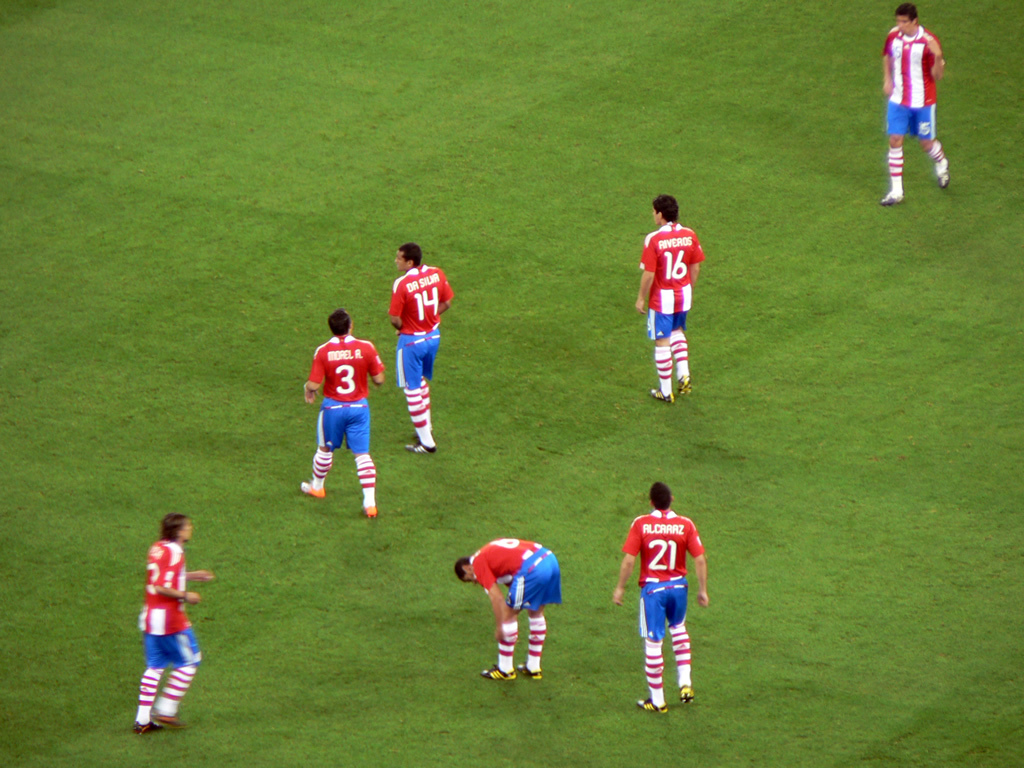
The Albirroja vs. Italy on 14 June 2010

Pos	Team	Pld	W	D	L	GF	GA	GD	Pts	Qualification
1	Paraguay	3	1	2	0	3	1	+2	5	Advance to knockout stage
2	Slovakia	3	1	1	1	4	5	−1	4	Advance to knockout stage
3	New Zealand	3	0	3	0	2	2	0	3	
4	Italy	3	0	2	1	4	5	−1	2	

Source: FIFA
Rules for classification: Tie-breaking criteria

The 2010 World Cup saw Paraguay drawn into Group F alongside defending champions Italy, Slovakia and New Zealand, with the team facing Italy in their opening match and drawing 1–1, after taking the lead in the 39th minute. They then beat Slovakia 2–0 and drew New Zealand 0–0, to finish first in the group.

Paraguay then eliminated Japan in the round of 16, as they won a penalty shoot-out 5–3 after a 0–0 draw. Paraguay advanced to the quarter-finals for the first time. The Albirroja were drawn against Spain at the quarter-final stage. Paraguayan goalkeeper Justo Villar saved a penalty kick, but Spain scored in the 83rd minute to win 1–0, and went on to win the tournament. After the match, Gerardo Martino stated that he would be leaving his position at the end of his contract.

==== 2011 Copa América ====
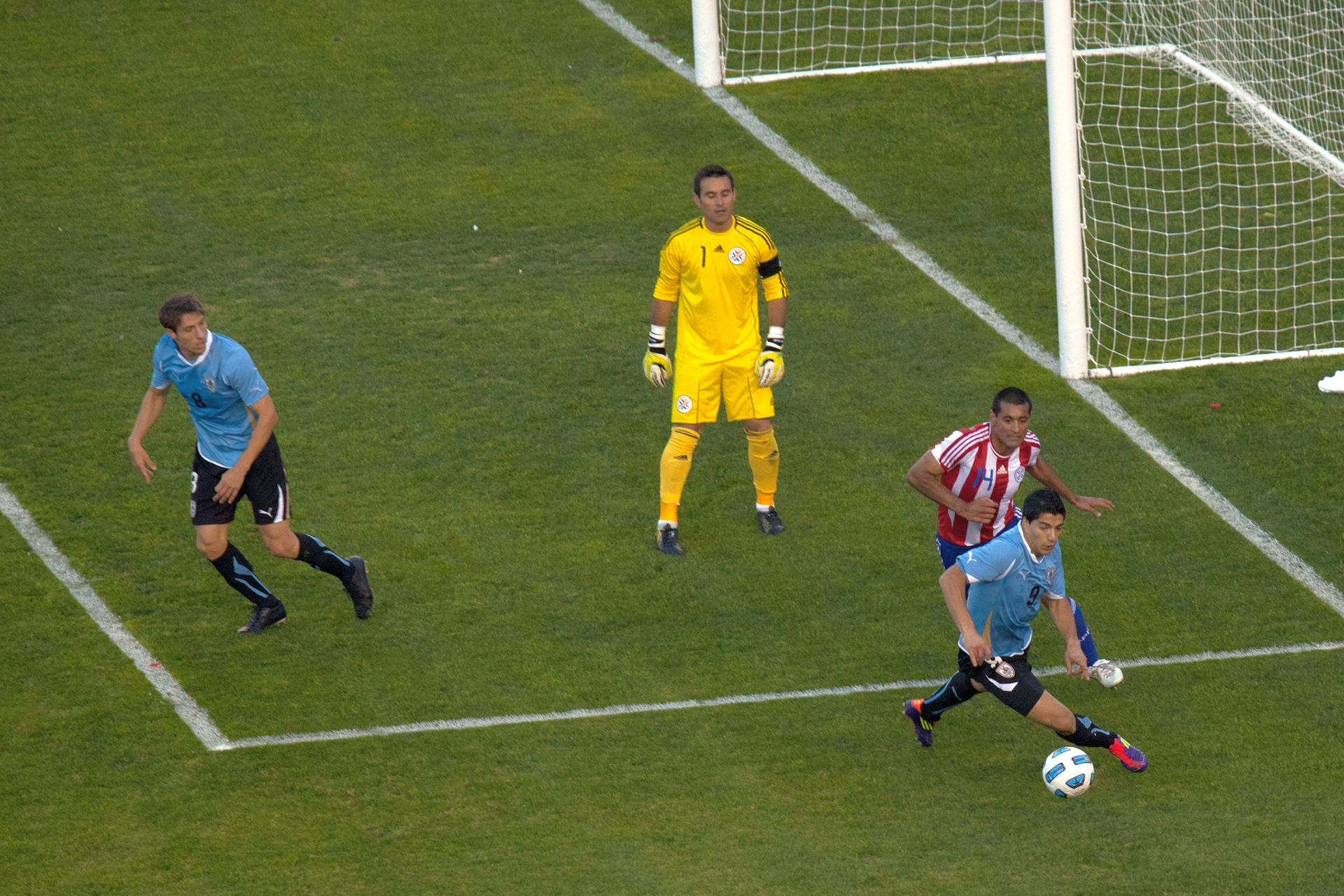
Paraguay's Justo Villar (centre, in yellow) was voted best goalkeeper of the 2011 Copa América.

At the 2011 Copa América, Paraguay were paired with Group B with Brazil, Venezuela and Ecuador, drawing all three matches to end up as the group's third-place team.

As one of the best third-placed teams that advanced, Paraguay won the rematch against Brazil. The match was decided via a penalty shoot out, with Paraguay winning in order to meet Venezuela in the semi-final. With another penalty shoot out, Paraguay won 5–3 to advance to their first final since 1979, where they lost to Uruguay. Despite the loss, Paraguayan goalkeeper Justo Villar was awarded as the best goalkeeper of the tournament. Gerardo Martino resigned soon afterwards as coach of the Albirroja.

=== 2011–present ===
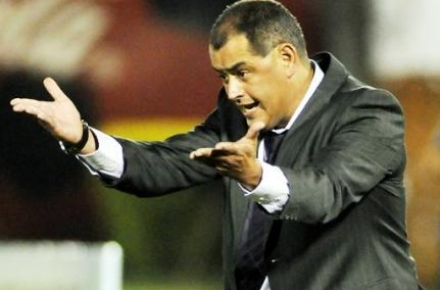
Francisco Arce was in charge of the Albirroja in 2011, following the departure of Gerardo Martino.

Throughout the duration of the 2014 World Cup qualifiers, Paraguay changed coaches three times, only to end up last in qualifying. The 2015 Copa América eventually saw Paraguay reach the semi-finals, after defeating Brazil in the quarter-finals on penalties. They were eliminated by Argentina by a score of 6–1.

Paraguay finished last in their group in a special Copa América Centenario.

Paraguay qualified for the 2026 FIFA World Cup, their first since 2010. In the group stage, they lost 4–1 to hosts United States, before defeating Turkey 1–0. Paraguay advanced to the knockout stages and faced Germany in the Round of 32 at Gillette Stadium. After a 1–1 draw in regular and extra time—with Julio Enciso scoring for Paraguay and Kai Havertz evening it up for Germany—Paraguay secured a historic upset by defeating the Germans 4–3 in a dramatic penalty shootout to advance to the Round of 16, after which they faced France in a 1–0 loss due to a 70th minute penalty goal by Kylian Mbappe.

== Team image ==
Paraguay traditionally wears red and white shirts and blue shorts and socks.

Kit provider	Period
(West Germany) Adidas	1979–1980
(Brazil) Textil Paraná	1981–1983
(Brazil) Rainha	1984–1986
(Argentina) Sportman	1987–1990
(Brazil) Textil Paraná	1991–1992
(Italy) Ennerre	1993–1994
(United States) Reebok	1995–1998
(Germany) Puma	1999–2006
(Germany) Adidas	2007–2019
(Germany) Puma	2020–present

== Results and fixtures ==
The following is a list of match results in the last 12 months, as well as any future matches that have been scheduled.

Win Draw Loss Fixture

=== 2026 ===
27 March Friendly	Greece	0–1	Paraguay	Piraeus, Greece
21:00 UTC+2		Report	D. Gómez 52'	Stadium: Karaiskakis Stadium; Attendance: 10,000; Referee: Daniele Chiffi (Italy)

31 March Friendly	Morocco	2–1	Paraguay	Lens, France
20:00 UTC+2	El Khannouss 48'; El Aynaoui 53'	Report	Caballero 88'	Stadium: Stade Bollaert-Delelis; Attendance: 38,000; Referee: Éric Wattellier (France)

5 June Friendly	Paraguay	4–0	Nicaragua	Asunción, Paraguay
19:15 UTC−3	Kaku 17' (pen.); Almirón 42'; Galarza 62'; Maidana 67'	Report		Stadium: Estadio Defensores del Chaco; Attendance: 35,000; Referee: Maximiliano Ramírez (Argentina)

12 June 2026 FIFA World Cup GS	United States	4–1	Paraguay	Inglewood, United States
18:00 UTC−7	Bobadilla 7' (o.g.); Balogun 31', 45+5'; Reyna 90+8'	Report	Maurício 73'	Stadium: SoFi Stadium; Attendance: 70,492; Referee: Danny Makkelie (Netherlands)

19 June 2026 FIFA World Cup GS	Turkey	0–1	Paraguay	Santa Clara, United States
21:00 UTC−7		Report	Galarza 2'	Stadium: Levi's Stadium; Attendance: 68,827; Referee: Iván Barton (El Salvador)

25 June 2026 FIFA World Cup GS	Paraguay	0–0	Australia	Santa Clara, United States
19:00 UTC−7		Report		Stadium: Levi's Stadium; Attendance: 68,827; Referee: Clément Turpin (France)

29 June 2026 FIFA World Cup R32	Germany	1–1 (a.e.t.) (3–4 p)	Paraguay	Foxborough, United States
16:30 UTC−4	Havertz 54'	Report	Enciso 42'	Stadium: Gillette Stadium; Attendance: 63,945; Referee: Jalal Jayed (Morocco)
	Penalties
	Havertz (penalty missed); Kimmich (penalty scored); Musiala (penalty scored); Woltemade (penalty missed); Amiri (penalty scored); Tah (penalty missed)		(penalty scored) Maurício; (penalty scored) G. Gómez; (penalty scored) Galarza; (penalty missed) Sanabria; (penalty missed) Balbuena; (penalty scored) Canale

4 July 2026 FIFA World Cup R16	Paraguay	0–1	France	Philadelphia, United States
17:00 UTC−4		Report	Mbappé 70' (pen.)	Stadium: Lincoln Financial Field; Attendance: 68,324; Referee: Ilgiz Tantashev (Uzbekistan)

27 September Friendly	Bolivia	0–2	Paraguay	Washington, D.C., United States
16:30 UTC−4		Report	Almirón 17', 50'	Stadium: Audi Field; Referee: Rosendo Mendoza (United States)

2 October Friendly	Colombia	0–1	Paraguay	Harrison, United States
20:00 UTC−4		Report	H. Benítez 56'	Stadium: Sports Illustrated Stadium; Referee: Pierre-Luc Lauzière (Canada)

13 November Friendly	Singapore	1–4	Paraguay	Kallang, Singapore
20:00 UTC+8	Song Ui-young 30'	Report	Caballero 7', 53'; Maurício 45'; Enciso 82'	Stadium: National Stadium; Attendance: 14,360; Referee: Wiwat Jumpao-on (Thailand)

17 November Friendly	Japan	1–2	Paraguay	Kallang, Singapore
21:10 UTC+8	Fukuda 85'	Report	Caceres 2'; G. Gomez 40'	Stadium: National Stadium; Referee: Mongkolchai Pechsri (Thailand)

== Coaching staff ==
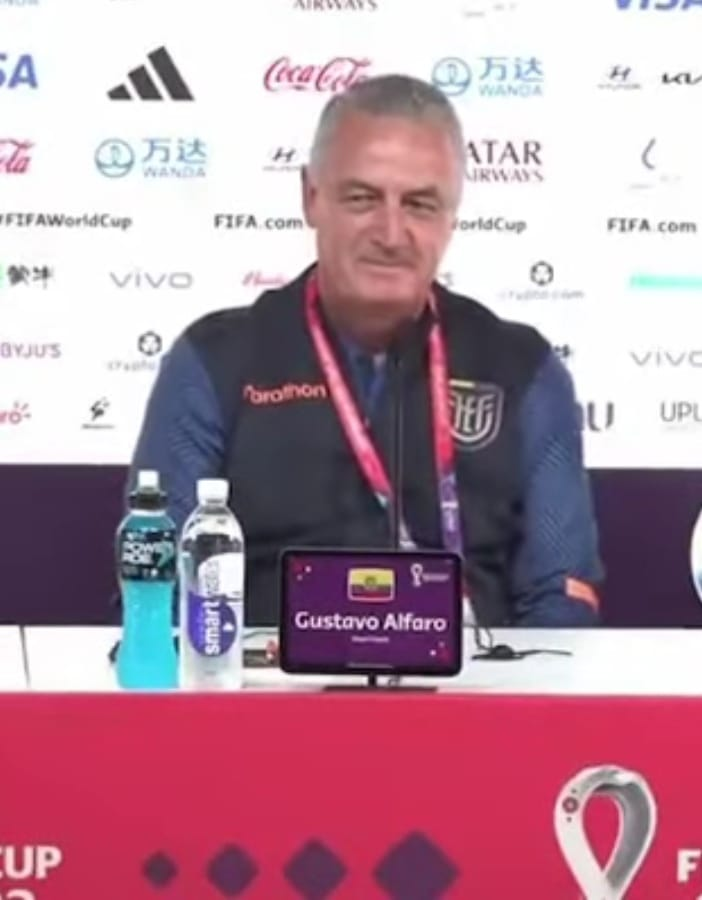
Current head coach Gustavo Alfaro

Position	Name
Head coach	(Argentina) Gustavo Alfaro
Assistant coach	(Argentina) Carlos Gonzalez
Assistant coach	(Argentina) Claudio Cristofanelli
Fitness coach	(Argentina) Sergio Omar
Fitness coach	(Argentina) Pedro Ignacio
Video analyst	(Argentina) Alejandro Juan
Goalkeeping coach	(Argentina) Diego Carranza
First-team Doctor	(Paraguay) Justo Tapia
Physiotherapist	(Paraguay) Luis Canteros
Academy manager	(Argentina) Elvio Paolorosso

== Players ==
=== Current squad ===
The following players were called up to the squad for the friendly matches against Singapore and Japan on 13 and 17 November 2026, respectively.
Caps and goals updated as of 17 November 2026, after the match against Japan.

No.	Pos.	Player	Date of birth (age)	Caps	Goals	Club
1	GK	Santiago Rojas	5 April 1996 (age 30)	2	0	(Paraguayan Football Association) Nacional
12	GK	Orlando Gill	11 June 2000 (age 26)	14	0	(French Football Federation) Lille
22	GK	Gastón Olveira	21 April 1993 (age 33)	3	0	(Paraguayan Football Association) Olimpia
	GK	Facundo Lirussi	4 May 2006 (age 20)	0	0	(United Arab Emirates Football Association) Al-Wahda
2	DF	Alan Benítez	25 January 1994 (age 32)	10	0	(Paraguayan Football Association) Libertad
3	DF	Omar Alderete	26 December 1996 (age 29)	43	3	(The Football Association) Sunderland
4	DF	Juan Cáceres	1 June 2000 (age 26)	25	1	(Russian Football Union) Dynamo Moscow
5	DF	Clever Ferreira	20 February 2003 (age 23)	2	0	(Argentine Football Association) Atlético Tucumán
6	DF	Júnior Alonso	9 February 1993 (age 33)	78	3	(United States Soccer Federation) Atlanta United
13	DF	Mateo Gamarra	6 May 1993 (age 33)	5	0	(Paraguayan Football Association) Olimpia
15	DF	Gustavo Gómez (captain)	6 May 1993 (age 33)	97	5	(Brazilian Football Confederation) Palmeiras
25	DF	Mauro Coronel	25 May 2008 (age 18)	1	0	(Paraguayan Football Association) Nacional
26	DF	Alexandro Maidana	26 July 2005 (age 21)	7	1	(Argentine Football Association) Talleres
7	MF	Eduardo Delmas	19 April 2007 (age 19)	1	0	(Paraguayan Football Association) Olimpia
8	MF	Diego Gómez	27 March 2003 (age 23)	32	3	(The Football Association) Brighton & Hove Albion
10	MF	Miguel Almirón	10 February 1994 (age 32)	84	12	(United States Soccer Federation) Atlanta United
11	MF	Maurício Magalhães	22 June 2001 (age 25)	11	2	(Brazilian Football Confederation) Palmeiras
14	MF	Braian Ojeda	27 June 2000 (age 26)	19	0	(United States Soccer Federation) Orlando City
16	MF	Damián Bobadilla	11 July 2001 (age 25)	25	1	(Brazilian Football Confederation) São Paulo
17	MF	Hugo Cuenca	8 January 2005 (age 21)	5	0	(Royal Spanish Football Federation) Celta Fortuna
20	MF	Mathías Villasanti	24 January 1997 (age 29)	53	0	(Brazilian Football Confederation) Grêmio
23	MF	Matías Galarza	11 February 2002 (age 24)	23	4	(United States Soccer Federation) Inter Miami
9	FW	Hugo Benítez	30 July 2003 (age 23)	3	1	(Paraguayan Football Association) Nacional
18	FW	Allan Wlk	1 March 2003 (age 23)	1	0	(Argentine Football Association) Lanús
19	FW	Julio Enciso	23 January 2004 (age 22)	41	6	(The Football Association) Ipswich Town
21	FW	Robert Morales	17 March 1999 (age 27)	4	1	(Mexican Football Federation) UNAM
24	FW	Gustavo Caballero	21 September 2001 (age 25)	7	3	(Brazilian Football Confederation) Santos

=== Recent call-ups ===
The following players have received a call-up within the past 12 months:

Pos.	Player	Date of birth (age)	Caps	Goals	Club	Latest call-up
GK	Roberto Fernández	29 March 1988 (age 38)	31	0	(Paraguay) Cerro Porteño	2026 FIFA World Cup
GK	Carlos Coronel	29 December 1996 (age 29)	9	0	(Brazil) São Paulo	2026 FIFA World Cup ^{PRE}
GK	Juan Espínola	2 November 1994 (age 32)	1	0	(Argentina) Barracas Central	2026 FIFA World Cup ^{PRE}
GK	Aldo Pérez	3 November 2000 (age 26)	0	0	(Paraguay) Guaraní	v. Mexico, 18 November 2025
DF	José Canale	20 July 1996 (age 30)	7	0	(Argentina) Lanús	v. Colombia, 3 October 2026
DF	Alexis Cañete	27 August 2003 (age 23)	0	0	(Paraguay) Cerro Porteño	v. Colombia, 3 October 2026
DF	Fabián Balbuena	23 August 1991 (age 35)	49	2	(Brazil) Grêmio	2026 FIFA World Cup
DF	Gustavo Velázquez	17 April 1991 (age 35)	18	1	(Paraguay) Cerro Porteño	2026 FIFA World Cup
DF	Blas Riveros	3 February 1998 (age 28)	15	0	(Paraguay) Cerro Porteño	2026 FIFA World Cup ^{PRE}
DF	Agustín Sández	16 January 2001 (age 25)	5	0	(Argentina) Rosario Central	2026 FIFA World Cup ^{PRE}
DF	Saúl Salcedo	28 August 1997 (age 29)	2	0	(Argentina) Newell's Old Boys	2026 FIFA World Cup ^{PRE}
DF	Diego León	3 April 2007 (age 19)	1	0	(England) Manchester United U21	2026 FIFA World Cup ^{PRE}
DF	Alcides Benítez	8 June 2002 (age 24)	0	0	(Argentina) Belgrano	2026 FIFA World Cup ^{PRE}
DF	Ronaldo Dejesús	21 April 2001 (age 25)	0	0	(Argentina) Lanús	2026 FIFA World Cup ^{PRE}
DF	Alan Núñez	1 October 2004 (age 22)	0	0	(Argentina) Argentinos Juniors	2026 FIFA World Cup ^{PRE}
DF	Alexis Duarte	12 March 2000 (age 26)	1	0	(Brazil) Santos	v. Mexico, 18 November 2025
MF	Andrés Cubas	22 May 1996 (age 30)	40	0	(Canada) Vancouver Whitecaps	v. Colombia, 3 October 2026
MF	Ramón Sosa	31 August 1999 (age 27)	32	1	(Brazil) Palmeiras	v. Colombia, 3 October 2026
MF	Enso González	20 January 2005 (age 21)	1	0	(England) Wolverhampton Wanderers	v. Colombia, 3 October 2026
MF	Hugo Quintana	10 November 2001 (age 25)	0	0	(Ecuador) Independiente del Valle	v. Colombia, 3 October 2026
MF	Alejandro Romero Gamarra	11 January 1995 (age 31)	34	6	(United Arab Emirates) Al-Ain	2026 FIFA World Cup
MF	Robert Piris Da Motta	26 July 1994 (age 32)	9	0	(Paraguay) Cerro Porteño	2026 FIFA World Cup ^{PRE}
MF	Álvaro Campuzano	12 June 1995 (age 31)	4	0	(Paraguay) Libertad	2026 FIFA World Cup ^{PRE}
MF	Diego González	7 January 2003 (age 23)	4	0	(Mexico) Santos Laguna	2026 FIFA World Cup ^{PRE}
MF	Lucas Romero	29 August 2002 (age 24)	2	0	(Mexico) Juárez	2026 FIFA World Cup ^{PRE}
MF	Rubén Lezcano	9 February 2004 (age 22)	0	0	(Paraguay) Olimpia	2026 FIFA World Cup ^{PRE}
FW	Antonio Sanabria	4 March 1996 (age 30)	50	7	(Brazil) Internacional	v. Colombia, 3 October 2026
FW	Álex Arce	16 June 1995 (age 31)	19	1	(Argentina) Independiente Rivadavia	v. Colombia, 3 October 2026
FW	Gabriel Ávalos	9 July 1991 (age 35)	26	2	(Paraguay) Olimpia	2026 FIFA World Cup
FW	Isidro Pitta	14 August 1999 (age 27)	6	0	(Brazil) Red Bull Bragantino	2026 FIFA World Cup
FW	Óscar Romero	4 July 1992 (age 34)	55	4	(Argentina) Huracán	2026 FIFA World Cup ^{PRE}
FW	Ángel Romero	4 July 1992 (age 34)	51	8	(Argentina) Boca Juniors	2026 FIFA World Cup ^{PRE}
FW	Carlos González	4 February 1993 (age 33)	15	0	(Ecuador) Independiente del Valle	2026 FIFA World Cup ^{PRE}
FW	Adam Bareiro	26 July 1996 (age 30)	8	0	(Argentina) Boca Juniors	2026 FIFA World Cup ^{PRE}
FW	Lorenzo Melgarejo	10 August 1990 (age 36)	5	0	(Paraguay) Libertad	2026 FIFA World Cup ^{PRE}
FW	Ronaldo Martínez	25 April 1996 (age 30)	4	0	(Argentina) Vélez Sarsfield	2026 FIFA World Cup ^{PRE}
FW	Adrián Alcaraz	28 September 1999 (age 27)	0	0	(Mexico) Pachuca	2026 FIFA World Cup ^{PRE}
FW	Rodney Redes	22 February 2000 (age 26)	0	0	(Paraguay) Olimpia	2026 FIFA World Cup ^{PRE}
^{COV} Withdrew due to COVID-19^{INJ} Withdrew due to injury^{PRE} Preliminary squad^{RET} Retired from the national team^{SUS} Suspended^{WD} Withdrew from the squad

== Player records ==
As of 17 November 2026.
Players in bold are still active at international level.

=== Most caps ===
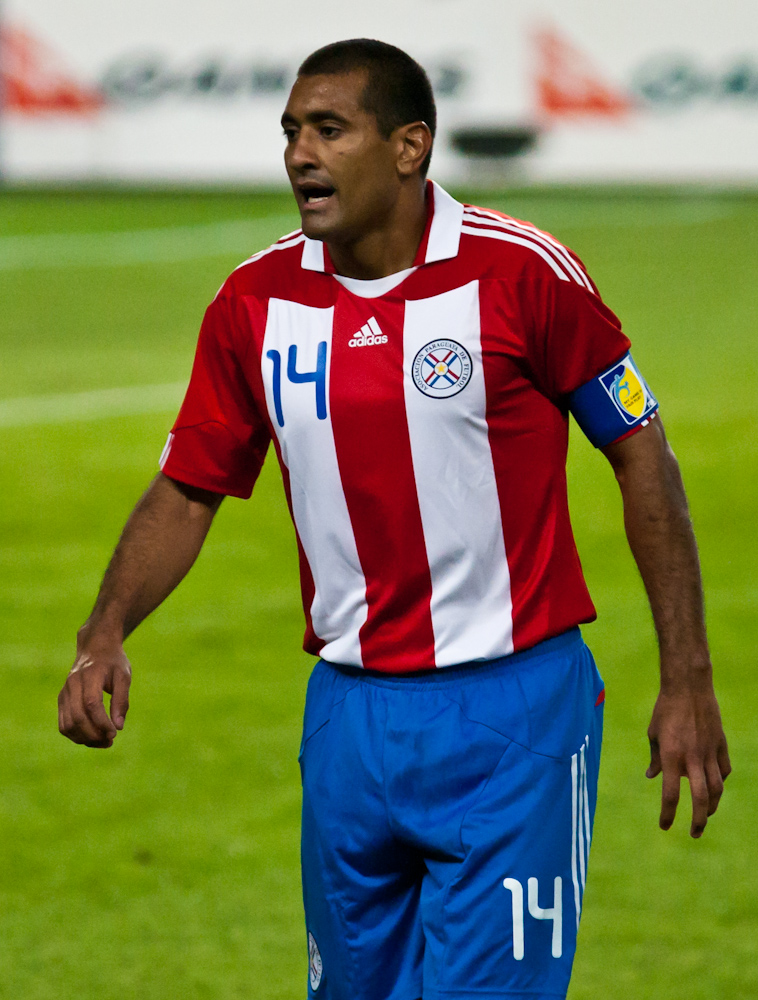
Paulo da Silva is Paraguay's most-capped player with 148 international appearances.

Rank	Player	Caps	Goals	Career
1	Paulo da Silva	148	3	2000–2017
2	Justo Villar	120	0	1999–2018
3	Roque Santa Cruz	112	32	1999–2016
4	Carlos Gamarra	110	12	1993–2006
5	Cristian Riveros	101	16	2005–2018
6	Roberto Acuña	100	5	1993–2011
6	Denis Caniza	100	1	1996–2010
8	**Gustavo Gómez**	97	5	2013–present
9	Celso Ayala	85	6	1993–2003
10	**Miguel Almirón**	84	12	2015–present

=== Most goals ===
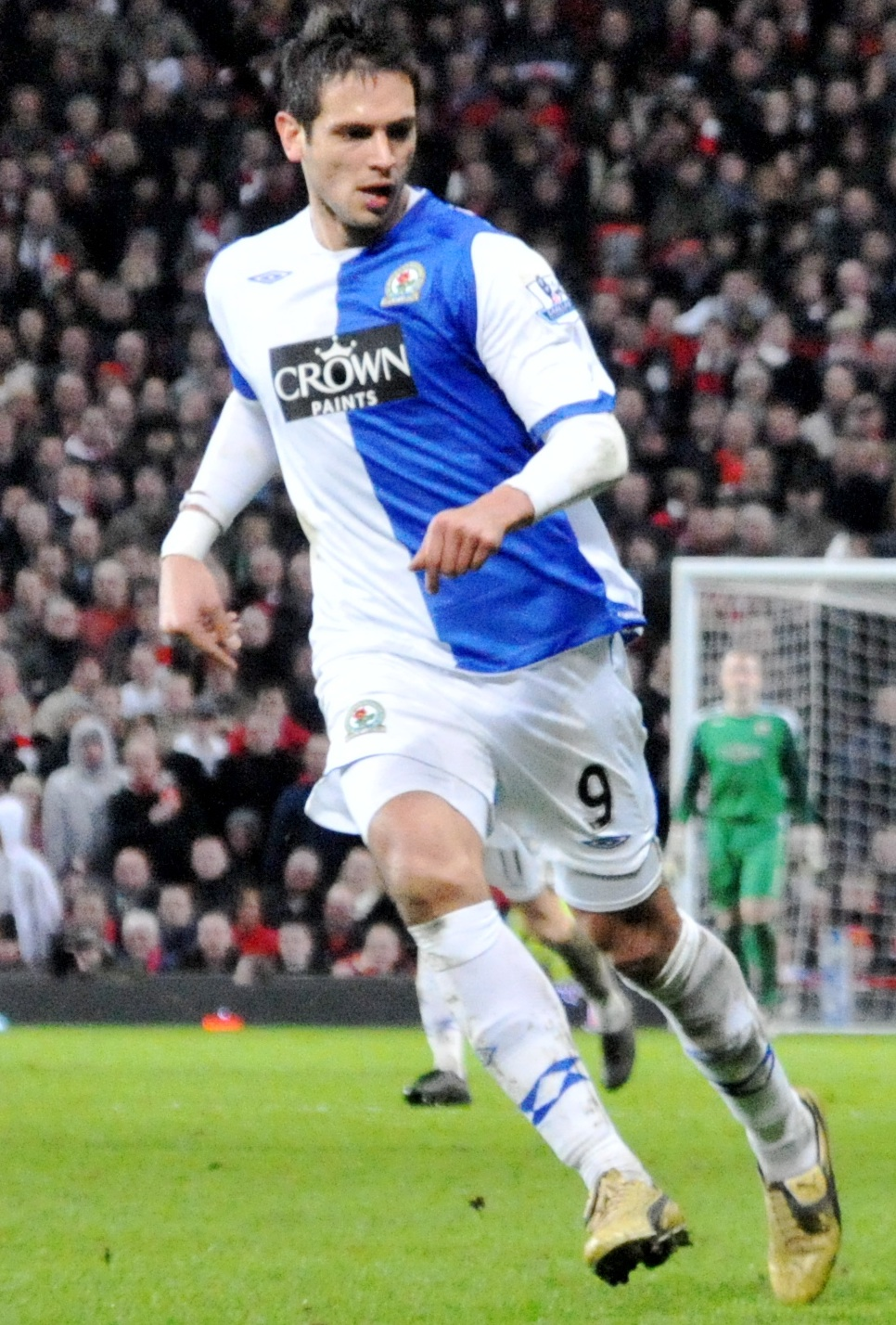
Roque Santa Cruz is Paraguay's all-time top scorer with 32 goals.

Rank	Player	Goals	Caps	Ratio	Career
1	Roque Santa Cruz	32	112	0.29	1999–2016
2	José Saturnino Cardozo	25	82	0.3	1991–2006
3	Cristian Riveros	16	101	0.16	2005–2018
4	Saturnino Arrúa	13	27	0.48	1969–1980
4	Romerito	13	34	0.38	1979–1989
4	Nelson Valdez	13	77	0.17	2004–2017
7	Óscar Cardozo	12	58	0.21	2006–2023
7	Carlos Gamarra	12	110	0.11	1993–2006
7	**Miguel Almirón**	12	84	0.15	2015–present
10	Roberto Cabañas	11	28	0.39	1981–1993

== Competitive record ==
=== FIFA World Cup ===
Champions Runners-up Third place Fourth place

FIFA World Cup record										Qualification record					
Year	Round	Position	Pld	W	D*	L	GF	GA	Squad	Pld	W	D	L	GF	GA
(Uruguay) 1930	Group stage	9th	2	1	0	1	1	3	Squad	Qualified as invitees					
(Italy) 1934	Did not enter									Declined participation					
(France) 1938	Did not enter									Declined participation					
(Brazil) 1950	Group stage	11th	2	0	1	1	2	4	Squad	Qualified automatically					
(Switzerland) 1954	Did not qualify									4	2	0	2	8	6
(Sweden) 1958	Group stage	12th	3	1	1	1	9	12	Squad	4	3	0	1	11	4
(Chile) 1962	Did not qualify									2	0	1	1	0	1
(England) 1966	Did not qualify									4	1	1	2	3	5
(Mexico) 1970	Did not qualify									6	4	0	2	6	5
(West Germany) 1974	Did not qualify									4	2	1	1	8	5
(Argentina) 1978	Did not qualify									4	1	2	1	3	3
(Spain) 1982	Did not qualify									4	1	0	3	3	6
(Mexico) 1986	Round of 16	13th	4	1	2	1	4	6	Squad	8	3	3	2	14	8
(Italy) 1990	Did not qualify									4	2	0	2	6	7
(United States) 1994	Did not qualify									6	1	4	1	6	7
(France) 1998	Round of 16	14th	4	1	2	1	3	2	Squad	16	9	2	5	21	14
(South Korea) (Japan) 2002	Round of 16	16th	4	1	1	2	6	7	Squad	18	9	3	6	29	23
(Germany) 2006	Group stage	18th	3	1	0	2	2	2	Squad	18	8	4	6	23	23
(South Africa) 2010	Quarter-finals	8th	5	1	3	1	3	2	Squad	18	10	3	5	24	16
(Brazil) 2014	Did not qualify									16	3	3	10	17	31
(Russia) 2018	Did not qualify									18	7	3	8	19	25
(Qatar) 2022	Did not qualify									18	3	7	8	12	26
(Canada) (Mexico) (United States) 2026	Round of 16	16th	5	1	2	2	3	6	Squad	18	7	7	4	14	10
(Morocco) (Portugal) (Spain) 2030	Qualified as commemorative match hosts									Qualified as commemorative match hosts					
(Saudi Arabia) 2034	To be determined									To be determined					
Total	Quarter-finals	9/23	32	8	12	12	33	44	—	190	76	44	70	227	225

*Draws include knockout matches decided via penalty shoot-out.

=== Copa América ===
South American Championship / Copa América record
Year	Round	Position	Pld	W	D*	L	GF	GA	Squad
(Argentina) 1916	Not a CONMEBOL member								
(Uruguay) 1917	Not a CONMEBOL member								
(Brazil) 1919	Not a CONMEBOL member								
(Chile) 1920	Not a CONMEBOL member								
(Argentina) 1921	Fourth place	4th	3	1	0	2	2	7	Squad
(Brazil) 1922	Runners-up	2nd	5	2	1	2	5	6	Squad
(Uruguay) 1923	Third place	3rd	3	1	0	2	4	6	Squad
(Uruguay) 1924	Third place	3rd	3	1	1	1	4	4	Squad
(Argentina) 1925	Third place	3rd	4	0	0	4	4	13	Squad
(Chile) 1926	Fourth place	4th	4	1	0	3	8	20	Squad
(Peru) 1927	Did not enter								
(Argentina) 1929	Runners-up	2nd	3	2	0	1	9	4	Squad
(Peru) 1935	Did not enter								
(Argentina) 1937	Fourth place	4th	5	2	0	3	8	16	Squad
(Peru) 1939	Third place	3rd	4	2	0	2	9	8	Squad
(Chile) 1941	Did not enter								
(Uruguay) 1942	Fourth place	4th	6	2	2	2	11	10	Squad
(Chile) 1945	Did not enter								
(Argentina) 1946	Third place	3rd	5	2	1	2	8	8	Squad
(Ecuador) 1947	Runners-up	2nd	7	5	1	1	16	11	Squad
(Brazil) 1949	Runners-up	2nd	8	6	0	2	21	13	Squad
(Peru) 1953	Champions	1st	7	4	2	1	14	8	Squad
(Chile) 1955	Fifth place	5th	5	1	1	3	7	14	Squad
(Uruguay) 1956	Fifth place	5th	5	0	2	3	3	8	Squad
(Peru) 1957	Did not enter								
(Argentina) 1959	Third place	3rd	6	3	0	3	12	12	Squad
(Ecuador) 1959	Fifth place	5th	4	0	1	3	6	11	Squad
(Bolivia) 1963	Runners-up	2nd	6	4	1	1	13	7	Squad
(Uruguay) 1967	Fourth place	4th	5	2	0	3	9	13	Squad
1975	Group stage	7th	4	1	1	2	5	5	Squad
1979	Champions	1st	9	4	4	1	13	7	Squad
1983	Third place	3rd	2	0	2	0	1	1	Squad
(Argentina) 1987	Group stage	9th	2	0	1	1	0	3	Squad
(Brazil) 1989	Fourth place	4th	7	3	1	3	9	10	Squad
(Chile) 1991	Group stage	6th	4	2	0	2	7	8	Squad
(Ecuador) 1993	Quarter-finals	8th	4	1	1	2	2	7	Squad
(Uruguay) 1995	Quarter-finals	6th	4	2	1	1	6	5	Squad
(Bolivia) 1997	Quarter-finals	7th	4	1	1	2	2	5	Squad
(Paraguay) 1999	Quarter-finals	6th	4	2	2	0	6	1	Squad
(Colombia) 2001	Group stage	10th	3	0	2	1	4	6	Squad
(Peru) 2004	Quarter-finals	5th	4	2	1	1	5	5	Squad
(Venezuela) 2007	Quarter-finals	5th	4	2	0	2	8	8	Squad
(Argentina) 2011	Runners-up	2nd	6	0	5	1	5	8	Squad
(Chile) 2015	Fourth place	4th	6	1	3	2	6	12	Squad
(United States) 2016	Group stage	13th	3	0	1	2	1	3	Squad
(Brazil) 2019	Quarter-finals	8th	4	0	3	1	3	4	Squad
(Brazil) 2021	Quarter-finals	6th	5	2	1	2	8	6	Squad
(United States) 2024	Group stage	14th	3	0	0	3	3	8	Squad
Total	2 Titles	39/44	180	64	43	73	267	311	—

=== Pan American Games ===
Pan American Games record
Year	Round	Position	Pld	W	D*	L	GF	GA
(Argentina) 1951	Fourth place	4th	4	1	0	3	5	14
(Mexico) 1955	Did not participate							
(United States) 1959	Did not participate							
(Brazil) 1963	Did not participate							
(Canada) 1967	Did not participate							
(Colombia) 1971	Did not participate							
(Mexico) 1975	Did not participate							
(Puerto Rico) 1979	Did not participate							
(Venezuela) 1983	Did not participate							
(United States) 1987	Preliminary round	9th	3	0	2	1	1	8
(Cuba) 1991	Did not qualify							
(Argentina) 1995	Quarter-finals	7th	4	2	0	2	4	3
Since 1999	See Paraguay national under-23 football team							
Total	Fourth place	3/12	11	3	2	6	10	25

== Head-to-head record ==
Below is a result summary of all matches Paraguay have played against FIFA recognized teams.

As of 17 November 2026

Positive Record Neutral Record Negative Record

Opponents	Pld	W	D	L	GF	GA	GD	Win %
Argentina	108	17	35	56	113	219	−106	15.7%
Armenia	2	1	0	1	3	2	+1	50%
Australia	6	0	4	2	2	4	−2	0%
Austria	1	0	1	0	0	0	0	0%
Bahrain	1	1	0	0	2	1	+1	100%
Belgium	3	1	1	1	3	3	0	33.3%
Bolivia	72	37	19	16	139	76	+63	51.3%
Bosnia and Herzegovina	1	1	0	0	3	0	+3	100%
Brazil	85	12	22	51	68	184	−116	14.1%
Bulgaria	2	1	1	0	1	0	+1	50%
Cameroon	1	1	0	0	2	1	+1	100%
Canada	1	0	1	0	0	0	0	0%
Chile	69	30	8	31	94	96	−2	43.4%
China	3	1	1	1	4	3	+1	33.3%
Colombia	52	19	10	23	56	61	−5	36.5%
Costa Rica	10	3	3	4	7	7	0	30%
Czech Republic	1	0	0	1	0	1	−1	0%
Denmark	1	0	1	0	1	1	0	0%
Ecuador	42	22	8	12	72	52	+20	52.3%
El Salvador	6	6	0	0	11	1	+10	100%
England	3	0	0	3	0	8	−8	0%
France	6	0	2	4	4	15	−11	0%
Georgia	1	1	0	0	1	0	+1	100%
Germany	3	0	2	1	4	5	−1	0%
Greece	2	2	0	0	3	0	+3	100%
Guadeloupe	1	1	0	0	2	0	+2	100%
Guatemala	11	9	2	0	25	10	+15	81.8%
Honduras	7	2	4	1	9	6	+3	37.5%
Hong Kong	2	1	1	0	8	1	+7	50%
Hungary	1	0	1	0	1	1	0	0%
Indonesia	1	1	0	0	3	2	+1	100%
Iran	1	0	1	0	1	1	0	0%
Iraq	1	1	0	0	1	0	+1	100%
Italy	3	0	1	2	2	6	−4	0%
Ivory Coast	2	0	2	0	3	3	0	0%
Jamaica	6	4	0	2	11	7	+4	66.6%
Japan	13	3	5	5	14	18	−4	23%
Jordan	1	1	0	0	4	2	+2	100%
Martinique	1	1	0	0	2	0	+2	100%
Mexico	22	6	5	11	19	38	−19	27.2%
Morocco	2	0	1	1	1	2	−1	0%
Netherlands	2	0	1	1	1	3	−2	0%
New Zealand	3	2	1	0	5	2	+3	66.6%
Nicaragua	2	2	0	0	6	0	+6	100%
Nigeria	2	1	1	0	4	2	+2	50%
North Korea	1	1	0	0	1	0	+1	100%
North Macedonia	1	1	0	0	1	0	+1	100%
Norway	1	0	1	0	2	2	0	0%
Oman	1	1	0	0	1	0	+1	100%
Panama	6	5	1	0	10	1	+9	83.3%
Peru	60	25	16	19	79	67	+12	41.6%
Poland	1	1	0	0	4	0	+4	100%
Portugal	1	0	1	0	0	0	0	0%
Qatar	4	1	2	1	6	5	+1	25%
Republic of Ireland	2	0	0	2	1	4	−3	0%
Romania	2	1	0	1	4	3	+1	50%
Saudi Arabia	3	0	3	0	1	1	0	0%
Scotland	1	1	0	0	3	2	+1	100%
Serbia (Note: Includes matches against Yugoslavia.)	4	1	1	2	6	6	0	25%
Singapore	1	1	0	0	4	1	+3	100%
Slovakia	2	1	1	0	3	1	+2	50%
Slovenia	1	1	0	0	3	1	+2	100%
South Africa	5	1	3	1	6	7	−1	20%
South Korea	8	2	3	3	8	9	−1	25%
Spain	4	0	2	2	1	4	−3	0%
Sweden	3	1	1	1	4	4	0	33.3%
Togo	1	1	0	0	4	2	+2	100%
Trinidad and Tobago	3	1	2	0	5	3	+2	33.3%
Turkey	2	1	1	0	0	1	0	50%
United Arab Emirates	2	1	1	0	1	0	+1	50%
United States	10	2	2	6	8	16	−8	20%
Uruguay	79	26	20	33	96	116	−20	32.9%
Venezuela	29	19	5	5	51	25	+26	65.5%
Wales	1	0	1	0	0	0	0	0%
Total (74)	805	287	212	306	1035	1124	−89	36%

== Honours ==
=== Continental ===
- South American Championship / Copa América
  - (gold) Champions (2): 1953, 1979
  - (silver) Runners-up (6): 1922, 1929, 1947, 1949, 1963, 2011
  - (bronze) Third place (7): 1923, 1924, 1925, 1939, 1946, 1959-I, 1983

=== Friendly ===
- Copa Chevallier Boutell (2): 1925^{s}, 1945
- Copa Trompowski (1): 1950
- Copa Paz del Chaco (6): 1963, 1977, 1980, 1991, 1995, 2003
- Lunar New Year Cup (1): 1968
- Copa Artigas (1): 1975^{s}
- Copa Félix Bogado (2): 1973, 1983
- Copa Boquerón (1): 1988

=== Summary ===
Competition	1st place, gold medalist(s)	2nd place, silver medalist(s)	3rd place, bronze medalist(s)	Total
CONMEBOL Copa América	2	6	7	15
Total	2	6	7	15

Notes

- ^{s} Shared titles.

== See also ==
- Football in Paraguay
- Paraguay national futsal team
- Paraguay national under-17 football team – National U-17 association football team
- Paraguay national under-20 football team – National youth association football team
- Paraguay national under-23 football team
