= Siviwe Magidigidi =

South African footballer (born 2005)

Personal information
- Date of birth: 1 July 2005 (age 21)
- Place of birth: Tygerberg, Western Cape, South Africa
- Height: 1.82 m (6 ft 0 in)
- Position: Forward

Team information
- Current team: Beerschot
- Number: 25

Youth career
- –2022: Ubuntu Football Academy
- 2023–2024: SuperSport United Academy

Senior career*
Years	Team	Apps	(Gls)
2024–2025	SuperSport United	22	(0)
2025	Siwelele	12	(4)
2026–	Beerschot	6	(0)

International career^{‡}
2024–2025	South Africa U20	4	(2)
- * Club domestic league appearances and goals as of 19 April 2026 ‡ National team caps and goals as of 8 October 2025

Siviwe Magidigidi (born 1 July 2005) is a South African soccer player who plays as a forward for Belgian Challenger Pro League side Beerschot.

== Club career ==
=== SuperSport United ===
He signed for the academy team of SuperSport United from Ubuntu Football Academy. He made his professional debut in March against Richards Bay in a 3–1 in the 2023–24 Nedbank Cup quarterfinal.

=== Siwelele ===
In 2025 SuperSport United was sold to Siwelele and Magidigidi was one of the players moved to the new club. He scored a brace in their debut match in the South African Premiership to help the team to a 3–1 over Lamontville Golden Arrows.

=== K Beerschot VA ===
In January 2026 he signed for Challenger Pro League side Beerschot.

== International career ==
Magidigidi competed with the South Africa U-20 team at the 2025 FIFA U-20 World Cup, he scored a brace in a 5–0 win over New Caledonia to help the team register their first win in the tournament.
