= Daniel Bameyi =

Nigerian footballer (born 2006)

Personal information
- Full name: Daniel Kolocho Bameyi
- Date of birth: 4 January 2006 (age 20)
- Height: 1.79 m (5 ft 10 in)
- Position: Defender

Team information
- Current team: Yum Yum

Youth career
- Yum Yum

International career^{‡}
Years	Team	Apps	(Gls)
2023–	Nigeria U20	30	(0)
	Nigeria U23	4	
2022–	Nigeria	3	(0)
- ‡ National team caps and goals as of 16:14, 16 March 2023 (UTC)

Daniel Kolocho Bameyi (born 4 January 2006) is a Nigerian international footballer who plays as a defender.

== Club career ==
Bameyi is listed as playing for an Abuja-based club named Yum Yum FC, although it has been reported that no club by this name exists in Nigeria. Head coach of the Nigeria under-20 side, Ladan Bosso, stated in late May 2023 that Yum Yum FC were indeed a real club, actually named the Yum Yum Academy, and that Bameyi was on their books.

== International career ==
=== Youth ===
Bameyi represented Nigeria's under-20 team at the 2023 U-20 Africa Cup of Nations, captaining the side as they finished third in the competition. He was suspended for the quarter-finals after accumulating two yellow cards in the group stage.He also represent Nigeria u 20 at FIFA u 20 world cup 2023 as captain and he played all the matches

=== Senior ===
Bameyi was first called up to the senior team of Nigeria in November 2022, for a friendly game against Costa Rica, going on to make his debut in the 2–0 loss. He was again called up to the senior squad for two 2023 Africa Cup of Nations qualification games against Guinea-Bissau.

== Career statistics ==
=== International ===
As of matches played 16 March 2023.

National team	Year	Apps	Goals
Nigeria	2022	1	0
Total		1	0
