= Gabin Bernardeau =

French footballer (born 2006)

Personal information
- Date of birth: 24 January 2006 (age 20)
- Place of birth: Le Mans, France
- Height: 1.81 m (5 ft 11 in)
- Position: Midfielder

Team information
- Current team: Lorient

Youth career
- 2011–2017: CS Changé
- 2017–2024: Le Mans

Senior career*
Years	Team	Apps	(Gls)
2024–2025	Le Mans	30	(3)
2025–2026	Nice	4	(0)
2026–	Lorient	0	(0)

International career^{‡}
2025–	France U20	4	(1)
- * Club domestic league appearances and goals as of 17 May 2026 ‡ National team caps and goals as of 5 November 2025

Gabin Bernardeau (born 24 January 2006) is a French professional footballer who plays as a midfielder for Ligue 1 club Lorient.

== Early life ==
Bernardeau was born on 24 January 2006. Born in Le Mans, France, he is a native of the city.

== Career ==
As a youth player, Bernardeau joined the youth academy of Le Mans and was promoted to the club's senior team ahead of the 2024–25 season, where he made thirty league appearances and scored one goal. On French newspaper Ouest-France wrote in 2025 that he "not only established himself as one of the players in the squad with, without doubt, the most playing time over the last ten days of the championship, but... also won... the title of January Championnat National Player of the Month". Following his stint there, he signed for Ligue 1 side Nice in 2025.

On 8 July 2026, Bernardeau joined Lorient on a four-year contract.

== Style of play ==
Bernardeau plays as a midfielder. Left-footed, he is known for his vision.

== Career statistics ==
As of match played 4 March 2026

Appearances and goals by club, season and competition
Club	Season	League			Cup		Europe		Other		Total	
Club	Season	Division	Apps	Goals	Apps	Goals	Apps	Goals	Apps	Goals	Apps	Goals
Le Mans	2024–25	CFA	30	3	7	1	—		—		37	4
Nice	2025–26	Ligue 1	4	0	2	0	1 (Note: Appearance in UEFA Champions League)	0	—		7	0
Career total			34	3	9	1	1	0	0	0	44	4

== Honours ==
Nice

- Coupe de France runner-up: 2025–26

Individual

- Championnat National Player of the Month: January 2025
