= Lisandru Olmeta =

French footballer (born 2005)

Personal information
- Date of birth: 21 July 2005 (age 21)
- Place of birth: Ajaccio, France
- Height: 1.90 m (6 ft 3 in)
- Position: Goalkeeper

Team information
- Current team: Torreense
- Number: 16

Youth career
- 2011–2016: AS Pietrosella
- 2016–2020: Gazélec Ajaccio
- 2020–2023: Monaco
- 2023–2024: Lille

Senior career*
Years	Team	Apps	(Gls)
2023–2025	Lille B	38	(0)
2025–2026	Lille	0	(0)
2025–2026	→ Bastia (loan)	10	(0)
2025–2026	→ Bastia B (loan)	1	(0)
2026–	Torreense	0	(0)

International career^{‡}
2021–2022	France U17	11	(0)
2022	France U18	2	(0)
2024	France U19	2	(0)
2024–2025	France U20	10	(0)
- * Club domestic league appearances and goals as of 12 May 2026 ‡ National team caps and goals as of 18 October 2025

Lisandru Olmeta (born 21 July 2005) is a French professional footballer who plays as a goalkeeper for Liga Portugal 2 club Torreense.

== Club career ==
Olmeta made his professional debut for Bastia in a 2–0 Ligue 2 away defeat to Nancy on 28 October 2025, playing the full 90 minutes.

== Career statistics ==
=== Club ===
As of match played 10 January 2026

Club	Season	League			Cup		League Cup		Europe		Other		Total	
Club	Season	Division	Apps	Goals	Apps	Goals	Apps	Goals	Apps	Goals	Apps	Goals	Apps	Goals
Bastia (loan)	2025–26	Ligue 2	3	0	2	0	—		—		—		5	0
Career total			3	0	2	0	0	0	0	0	0	0	5	0
